= Max Martin production discography =

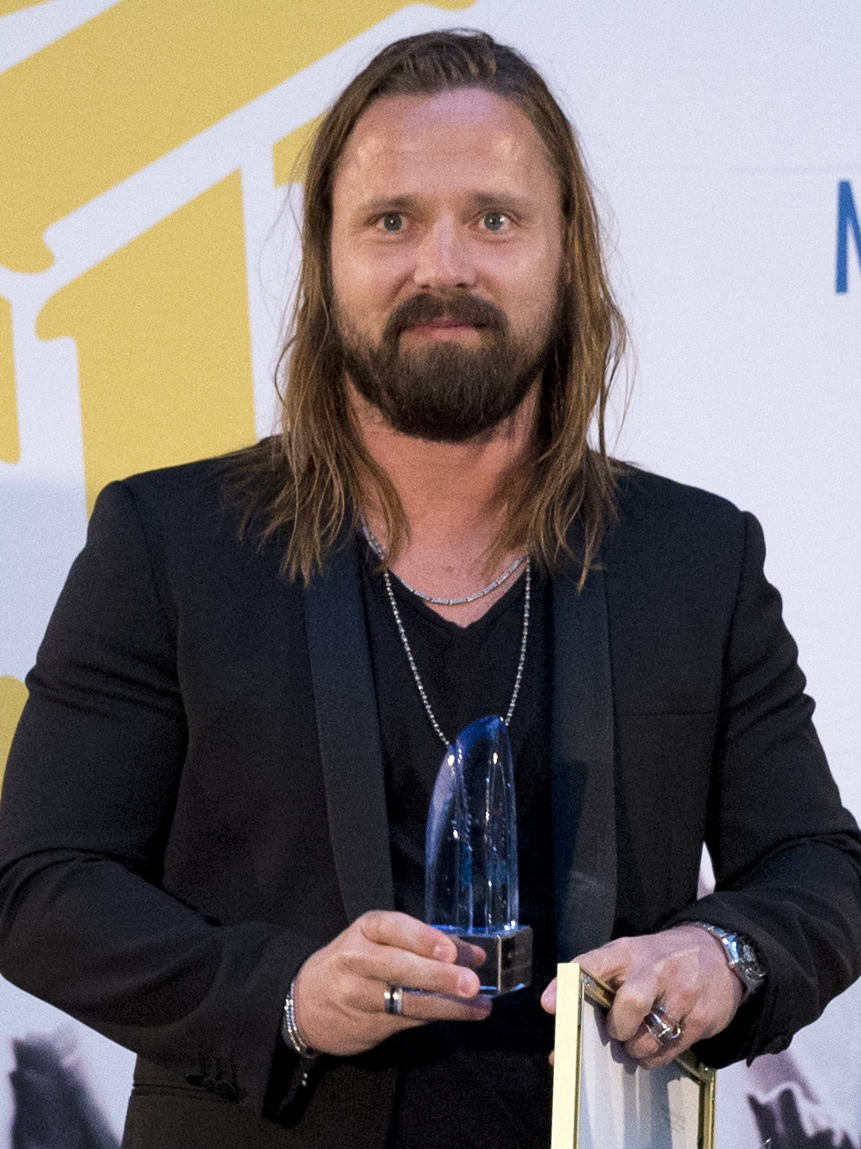
Max Martin in 2015

This is a list of Swedish record producer Max Martin's songwriting and production credits.

== Written and co-written songs ==
indicates a song that reached the number-one position on the Billboard Hot 100.

indicates a song that reached top ten on the Billboard Hot 100.

Year	Artist	Album	Song	Co-written with
1991	Camilla	Non-album single	"Sommarnatt"	David Garpenståhl, Alexander Kronlund
1994	E-Type	Made in Sweden	"Me No Want Miseria"	Martin Eriksson, Herbie Crichlow
1995	3T ft. Herbie	Brotherhood	"Gotta Be You"	Dag Volle, Herbie Crichlow
1995	Herbie	Fingers	"Big Funky Dealer"	Dag Volle, Herbie Crichlow
1995	Herbie	Fingers	"Change"	Dag Volle, Herbie Crichlow
1995	Herbie	Fingers	"Come Together"	Herbie Crichlow
1995	Herbie	Fingers	"Gangs to the Max"	Dag Volle, Herbie Crichlow
1995	Herbie	Fingers	"Rainbow Child"	Dag Volle, Herbie Crichlow
1995	Herbie	Fingers	"Right Type of Mood"	Herbie Crichlow
1995	Leila K	Manic Panic	"Electric"	Dag Volle, Herbie Crichlow, Laila El Khalifi, Chris Barbosa, Ed Chisholm
1995	Discovery	Non-album single	"Straight Up Funk"	Dag Volle, Herbie Crichlow
1996	Backstreet Boys	Backstreet Boys	"I Wanna Be with You"	Dag Volle
1996	Backstreet Boys	Backstreet Boys	"Quit Playing Games (with My Heart)"	Herbie Crichlow
1996	Backstreet Boys	Backstreet Boys	"Nobody But You"	Dag Volle, Herbie Crichlow
1996	Backstreet Boys	Backstreet Boys	"We've Got It Goin' On"	Dag Volle, Herbie Crichlow
1996	George	All the Way	"Up 'n Down"	Dag Volle, George Shahin, Marco Rakascan
1996	George	All the Way	"The Things You Do"	George Shahin, Herbie Crichlow
1996	Leila K	Manic Panic	"Blacklisted"	Dag Volle, David Wahlgren
1996	Leila K	Manic Panic	"C'Mon Now"	Dag Volle, Herbie Crichlow, Gene Simmons, Vincent Cusano
1996	Leila K	Manic Panic	"Rude Boy"	Dag Volle, Herbie Crichlow, Laila El Khalifi, David Wahlgren
1997	Backstreet Boys	Backstreet's Back	"Everybody (Backstreet's Back)"	Dag Volle
1997	Backstreet Boys	Backstreet's Back	"As Long as You Love Me"	
1997	Backstreet Boys	Backstreet's Back	"That's the Way I Like It"	Dag Volle, Herbie Crichlow
1997	Backstreet Boys	Backstreet's Back	"10,000 Promises"	
1997	DeDe	I Do	"Get to You"	Per Magnusson, David Kreuger, Kristian Lundin
1997	DeDe	I Do	"My Lover"	Per Magnusson, David Kreuger, DeDe Lopez
1997	Robyn	Robyn Is Here	"Do You Know (What It Takes)"	Robin Carlsson, Dag Volle, Herbie Crichlow
1997	Robyn	Robyn Is Here	"Show Me Love"	Robin Carlsson
1997	Solid HarmoniE	Solid HarmoniE	"I'll Be There for You"	Kristian Lundin
1997	Solid HarmoniE	Solid HarmoniE	"I Wanna Love You"	Kristian Lundin
1997	Solid HarmoniE	Solid HarmoniE	"I Want You to Want Me"	Jacob "Jake" Schulze
1997	Solid HarmoniE	Solid HarmoniE	"To Love Once Again"	Kristian Lundin
1998	5ive	5ive	"It's the Things You Do"	George Shahin, Herbie Crichlow
1998	5ive	5ive	"Slam Dunk (Da Funk)"	Dag Volle, Jacob "Jake" Schulze, Herbie Crichlow
1998	5ive	5ive	"Until the Time Is Through"	Andreas Carlsson
1998	5ive	5ive	"Don't You Want It"	Dag Volle, Richard Breen, Jason Brown, Sean Conlon, Ritchie Neville, Scott Robinson
1998	Bryan Adams	On a Day Like Today	"Before the Night Is Over"	Bryan Adams
1998	Bryan Adams	On a Day Like Today	"Cloud Number Nine"	Bryan Adams, Gretchen Peters
1998	Gary Barlow	Open Road	"Superhero"/"For All That You Want"	Kristian Lundin, Gary Barlow
1998	Jessica Folcker	Jessica	"A Little Bit Longer"	Dag Volle
1998	Jessica Folcker	Jessica	"Falling in Love"	Andreas Carlsson
1998	Jessica Folcker	Jessica	"How Will I Know (Who You Are)"	Kristian Lundin, Andreas Carlsson
1998	Jessica Folcker	Jessica	"Private Eye"	Dag Volle
1998	Jessica Folcker	Jessica	"Tell Me What You Like"	Dag Volle, Herbie Crichlow
1998	Jessica Folcker	Jessica	"Turned and Walked Away"	Jacob "Jake" Schulze
1998	*NSYNC	*NSYNC	"I Want You Back"	Dag Volle
1998	*NSYNC	*NSYNC	"Tearin' Up My Heart"	Kristian Lundin
1998	Britney Spears	...Baby One More Time	"...Baby One More Time"	
1999	Backstreet Boys	Millennium	"Larger than Life"	Kristian Lundin, Brian Littrell
1999	Backstreet Boys	Millennium	"I Want It That Way"	Andreas Carlsson
1999	Backstreet Boys	Millennium	"Show Me the Meaning of Being Lonely"	Herbie Crichlow
1999	Backstreet Boys	Millennium	"It's Gotta Be You"	Robert John "Mutt" Lange
1999	Backstreet Boys	Millennium	"Don't Want You Back"	
1999	Backstreet Boys	Millennium	"Don't Wanna Lose You Now"	
1999	Backstreet Boys	Millennium	"The One"	Brian Littrell
1999	Britney Spears	...Baby One More Time	"(You Drive Me) Crazy"	Jörgen Elofsson, Per Magnusson, David Kreuger,
1999	Britney Spears	...Baby One More Time	"I Will Be There"	Andreas Carlsson
1999	Celine Dion	All the Way... A Decade of Song	"That's the Way It Is"	Kristian Lundin, Andreas Carlsson
1999	Drain STH	Freaks Of Nature	"Right Through You"	Maria Sjöholm
1999	Drain STH	Freaks Of Nature	"Simon Says"	Martina Axén, Maria Sjöholm, Herbie Crichlow
1999	Gary Barlow	Twelve Months, Eleven Days	"For All That You Want"	Gary Barlow, Kristian Lundin
1999	Westlife	Westlife	"I Need You"	Andreas Carlsson, Rami Yacoub
2000	Artister för Amnesty	Non-album single	"Tusen Röster"	Mauro Scocco
2000	Backstreet Boys	Black & Blue	"The Call"	Rami Yacoub
2000	Backstreet Boys	Black & Blue	"Shape of My Heart"	Rami Yacoub, Lisa Miskovsky
2000	Backstreet Boys	Black & Blue	"Get Another Boyfriend"	Rami Yacoub
2000	Backstreet Boys	Black & Blue	"It's True"	Andreas Carlsson, Kevin Richardson
2000	Bon Jovi	Crush	"It's My Life"	Jon Bon Jovi, Richie Sambora
2000	Britney Spears	Oops!... I Did It Again	"Oops!... I Did It Again"	Rami Yacoub
2000	Britney Spears	Oops!... I Did It Again	"Stronger"	Rami Yacoub
2000	Britney Spears	Oops!... I Did It Again	"Don't Go Knocking on My Door"	Rami Yacoub, Alexander Kronlund, Jacob "Jake" Schulze
2000	Britney Spears	Oops!... I Did It Again	"Lucky"	Rami Yacoub, Alexander Kronlund
2000	Britney Spears	Oops!... I Did It Again	"Where Are You Now"	Rami Yacoub, Andreas Carlsson
2000	Britney Spears	Oops!... I Did It Again	"Can't Make You Love Me"	Kristian Lundin, Andreas Carlsson
2000	Britney Spears	Oops!... I Did It Again	"Girl in the Mirror"	Rami Yacoub, Jörgen Elofsson
2000	Jessica Folker	Dino	"Missing You Crazy"	Jolyon Skinner
2000	NSYNC	No Strings Attached	"It's Gonna Be Me"	Rami Yacoub, Andreas Carlsson
2000	NSYNC	No Strings Attached	"I'll Never Stop"	Kristian Lundin, Alexander Kronlund
2000	Westlife	Coast to Coast	"When You're Looking Like That"	Rami Yacoub, Andreas Carlsson
2000	Westlife	Coast to Coast	"You Make Me Feel"	Nick Jarl, Patric Jonsson
2001	Lambretta	Lambretta	"Bimbo"	Per Aldeheim, Alexander Kronlund
2001	Lambretta	Lambretta	"Creep"	Per Aldeheim, Alexander Kronlund
2001	*NSYNC	Celebrity	"Tell Me, Tell Me...Baby"	Rami Yacoub
2001	Prime STH	Underneath the Surface	"I'm Stupid (Don't Worry 'Bout Me)"	Noa Modén
2002	Def Leppard	X	"Unbelievable"	Andreas Carlsson, Per Aldeheim
2002	Play	Play	"Is It Love"	Jörgen Elofsson

=== Maratone/MXM/Wolf Cousins ===
Year	Artist	Album	Song	Co-written with
2001	Britney Spears	Britney	"Overprotected"	Rami Yacoub
2001	Britney Spears	Britney	"Bombastic Love"	Rami Yacoub
2001	Britney Spears	Britney	"Cinderella"	Rami Yacoub, Britney Spears
2001	Britney Spears	Britney	"I'm Not a Girl, Not Yet a Woman"	Rami Yacoub
2002	Pain	Nothing Remains the Same	"Just Hate Me"	Per Aldeheim
2002	Michael Bolton	Only a Woman like You	"Only a Woman like You"	Robert John "Mutt" Lange, Eilleen Regina "Shania" Twain, Rami Yacoub
2002	Nick Carter	Now or Never	"I Got You"	Rami Yacoub
2002	Nick Carter	Now or Never	"Blow Your Mind"	Rami Yacoub, Per Aldeheim
2002	Nick Carter	Now or Never	"I Just Wanna Take You Home"	Rami Yacoub, Per Aldeheim
2003	Celine Dion	One Heart	"Love Is All We Need"	Rami Yacoub
2003	Celine Dion	One Heart	"Faith"	Rami Yacoub
2003	Celine Dion	One Heart	"In His Touch"	Rami Yacoub
2004	Ana Johnsson	The Way I Am	"Don't Cry for Pain"	Ana Johnsson
2004	Ana Johnsson	The Way I Am	"I'm Stupid"	Noa Modén
2004	Kelly Clarkson	Breakaway	"Since U Been Gone"	Lukasz Gottwald
2004	Kelly Clarkson	Breakaway	"Behind These Hazel Eyes"	Kelly Clarkson, Lukasz Gottwald
2004	E-Type	Loud Pipes Save Lives	"Camilla"	Fredrik Ekdahl, Martin Eriksson
2004	E-Type	Loud Pipes Save Lives	"Olympia"	Fredrik Ekdahl, Martin Eriksson
2005	A-ha	Analogue	"Analogue (All I Want)"	Magne Furuholmen, Paul Waaktaar-Savoy
2005	Backstreet Boys	Never Gone	"Just Want You to Know"	Lukasz Gottwald
2005	Backstreet Boys	Never Gone	"I Still..."	Rami Yacoub
2005	Backstreet Boys	Never Gone	"Climbing the Walls"	Lukasz Gottwald
2005	Backstreet Boys	Never Gone	"Siberia"	Rami Yacoub, Alexandra Talomaa
2005	Bon Jovi	Have a Nice Day	"Complicated"	Jon Bon Jovi, Billy Falcon
2005	Twill		"Is It Love?"	Jörgen Elofsson
2005	Darin	The Anthem	"Stand by Me"	Alexandra Talomaa
2005	Marion Raven	Here I Am	"Break You"	Lukasz Gottwald
2005	Marion Raven	Here I Am	"Here I Am"	Rami Yacoub, Marion Ravn
2005	Marion Raven	Here I Am	"Little by Little"	Rami Yacoub, Peter Svensson, Marion Ravn
2005	Marion Raven	Here I Am	"End of Me"	Rami Yacoub, Marion Ravn
2005	Marion Raven	Here I Am	"Six Feet Under"	Rami Yacoub, Marion Ravn
2005	Marion Raven	Here I Am	"Gotta Be Kidding"	Rami Yacoub, Camela Leierth, Marion Ravn
2005	Marion Raven	Here I Am	"In Spite of Me"	Rami Yacoub, Alexandra Talomaa, Marion Ravn
2005	Marion Raven	Here I Am	"There I Said It"	Marion Ravn
2005	The Veronicas	The Secret Life Of...	"4ever"	Lukasz Gottwald
2005	The Veronicas	The Secret Life Of...	"Everything I'm Not"	Lukasz Gottwald, Jessica Origliasso, Lisa Origliasso, Rami Yacoub
2005	Bo Bice	The Real Thing	"U Make Me Better"	Lukasz Gottwald, Jill Latiano
2005	Bo Bice	The Real Thing	"Lie...It's All Right"	Lukasz Gottwald
2006	Pink	I'm Not Dead	"Who Knew"	Alecia Moore, Lukasz Gottwald
2006	Pink	I'm Not Dead	"Cuz I Can"	Alecia Moore, Lukasz Gottwald
2006	Pink	I'm Not Dead	"U + Ur Hand"	Alecia Moore, Lukasz Gottwald, Rami Yacoub
2006	Darin	Break the News	"Extraordinary Love"	Rami Yacoub, Robin Carlsson, Patrik Berger
2006	Ashley Parker Angel	Soundtrack to Your Life	"I'm Better"	Lukasz Gottwald, Shelly Peiken
2006	Ashley Parker Angel	Soundtrack to Your Life	"Let U Go"	Lukasz Gottwald
2006	Megan McCauley	Better Than Blood	"Tap That"	Lukasz Gottwald, Megan McCauley
2006	Stephanie McIntosh	Tightrope	"Mistake"	Rami Yacoub, Arnthor Birgisson
2006	Linda Sundblad	Oh My God!	"Pretty Rebels"	Alexander Kronlund, Linda Sundblad, Tobias Karlsson
2006	Kelis	Kelis Was Here	"I Don't Think So"	Lukasz Gottwald
2006	Tobias Regner	Straight	"Hologram"	Per Aldeheim, Tony Cornelissen
2007	Avril Lavigne	The Best Damn Thing	"I Will Be"	Avril Lavigne, Lukasz Gottwald
2007	Avril Lavigne	The Best Damn Thing	"Alone"	Avril Lavigne, Lukasz Gottwald
2007	Enrique Iglesias		"Alive" (unreleased)	Enrique Iglesias, Rami Yacoub, Arnthor Birgisson
2007	Shayne Ward	Breathless	"If That's OK with You"	Savan Kotecha, Arnthor Birgisson
2007	James Blunt	All the Lost Souls	"Carry You Home"	James Blunt
2007	Stanfour	Wild Life	"Do It All"	Per Aldeheim
2007	Apocalyptica	Worlds Collide	"I Don't Care"	Eicca Toppinen, Adam Gontier
2007	Amy Diamond	Music in Motion	"Stay My Baby"	Tommy Tysper
2007	Daughtry	Daughtry	"Feels Like Tonight"	Lukasz Gottwald, Sheppard Solomon
2007	Leona Lewis	Spirit	"I Will Be"	Avril Lavigne, Lukasz Gottwald
2008	Katy Perry	One of the Boys	"I Kissed a Girl"	Katy Perry, Lukasz Gottwald, Cathy Dennis
2008	Katy Perry	One of the Boys	"Hot n Cold"	Katy Perry, Lukasz Gottwald
2008	Carolina Liar	Coming to Terms	"Last Night"	Tobias Karlsson, Chad Wolfinbarger
2008	Carolina Liar	Coming to Terms	"Done Stealin"	Tobias Karlsson, Per Aldeheim, Chad Wolfinbarger
2008	Carolina Liar	Coming to Terms	"Beautiful World"	Tobias Karlsson, Chad Wolfinbarger
2008	Carolina Liar	Coming to Terms	"Best Friend's Girl"	Tobias Karlsson, Alexander Kronlund, Chad Wolfinbarger
2008	Simple Plan	Simple Plan	"Generation"	Simple Plan, Nate Hills, Arnold Lanni
2008	Bullet for My Valentine	Scream Aim Fire	"Watching Us Die Tonight"	Matt Tuck
2008	Gavin Degraw	Gavin Degraw	"In Love with a Girl"	Gavin Degraw, Howard Benson
2008	Cyndi Lauper	Bring Ya to the Brink	"Into the Nightlife"	Cyndi Lauper, Peer Åström, Johan Bobäck
2008	Lesley Roy	Unbeautiful	"I'm Gone I'm Going"	Lesley Roy, Johan Schuster, Alexander Kronlund
2008	Lesley Roy	Unbeautiful	"Here for You Now"	Lesley Roy
2008	Lesley Roy	Unbeautiful	"Psycho Bitch"	Lesley Roy, Savan Kotecha
2008	Lesley Roy	Unbeautiful	"Slow Goodbye"	Lesley Roy, Lukasz Gottwald, Katy Perry
2008	Lesley Roy	Unbeautiful	"Thinking Out Loud"	Lesley Roy
2008	Lesley Roy	Unbeautiful	"Dead But Breathing"	Lesley Roy, Camela Leierth, Per Aldeheim
2008	Lesley Roy	Unbeautiful	"Unbeautiful"	Rami Yacoub, Lesley Roy
2008	Skye Sweetnam	Sound Soldier	"Girl Like Me"	Skye Sweetnam, Lukasz Gottwald, Shelly Peiken
2008	Pink	Funhouse	"So What"	Alecia Moore, Johan Schuster
2008	Pink	Funhouse	"I Don't Believe You"	Alecia Moore
2008	Pink	Funhouse	"Please Don't Leave Me"	Alecia Moore
2008	Pink	Funhouse	"It's All Your Fault"	Alecia Moore, Johan Schuster
2008	Pink	Funhouse	"Boring"	Alecia Moore, Johan Schuster
2008	Pink	Funhouse	"Whataya Want from Me" (Unreleased)	Alecia Moore, Johan Schuster
2008	Vanessa Hudgens	Identified	"Identified"	Lukasz Gottwald, Cathy Dennis
2008	Sugababes	Catfights and Spotlights	"Unbreakable Heart"	Klas Åhlund
2008	Britney Spears	Circus	"If U Seek Amy"	Johan Schuster, Savan Kotecha, Alexander Kronlund
2009	Kelly Clarkson	All I Ever Wanted	"My Life Would Suck Without You"	Lukasz Gottwald, Claude Kelly
2009	Dean	Desire	"Hologram"	Tony Cornelissen, Per Aldeheim
2009	Living Things	Habeas Corpus	"Let It Rain"	Cory Becker, Josh Rothman, Jason Rothman, Yves Rothman
2009	Living Things	Habeas Corpus	"Oxygen"	Johan Schuster, Cory Becker, Josh Rothman, Jason Rothman, Yves Rothman
2009	Mitchel Musso	Mitchel Musso	"Do It Up"	Per Aldeheim
2009	Britney Spears	The Singles Collection	"3"	Johan Schuster, Tiffany Amber
2009	Backstreet Boys	This Is Us	"Bigger"	Johan Schuster, Tiffany Amber
2009	Leona Lewis	Echo	"I Got You"	Arnthor Birgisson, Savan Kotecha
2009	Leona Lewis	Echo	"Outta My Head"	Johan Schuster, Savan Kotecha
2009	Carrie Underwood	Play On	"Quitter"	Johan Schuster, Savan Kotecha
2009	Allison Iraheta	Just like You	"Friday I'll Be Over U"	Johan Schuster, Tiffany Amber, Savan Kotecha
2009	Allison Iraheta	Just like You	"Just Like You"	Johan Schuster, Savan Kotecha
2009	Adam Lambert	For Your Entertainment	"Whataya Want from Me"	Alecia Moore, Johan Schuster
2009	Adam Lambert	For Your Entertainment	"If I Had You"	Johan Schuster, Savan Kotecha
2009	Unsung Hero		"Get It Over With"	Sofi Bonde, Tobias Karlsson
2009	Erik Hassle	Hassle	"Love Me to Pieces"	Erik Hassle, Tommy Tysper, Reinhold Mack
2010	Kesha	Animal	"Kiss n Tell"	Kesha Sebert, Lukasz Gottwald, Johan Schuster
2010	Kesha	Animal	"Hungover"	Kesha Sebert, Johan Schuster
2010	Kesha	Animal	"Dinosaur"	Kesha Sebert, Johan Schuster
2010	Kesha	Cannibal	"Blow"	Kesha Sebert, Lukasz Gottwald, Benjamin Levin, Klas Åhlund, Allan Grigg
2010	Kesha	Cannibal	"Crazy Beautiful Life"	Kesha Sebert, Lukasz Gottwald, Pebe Sebert
2010	Kesha	Cannibal	"Grow a Pear"	Kesha Sebert, Lukasz Gottwald, Benjamin Levin
2010	Miranda Cosgrove	Sparks Fly	"Oh Oh"	Peer Åström, Savan Kotecha
2010	Erik Grönwall	Somewhere Between a Rock and a Hard Place	"In Spite of Me"	Rami Yacoub, Alexandra Talomaa, Marion Ravn
2010	Katy Perry	Teenage Dream	"California Gurls"	Lukasz Gottwald, Calvin Broadus, Katy Perry, Benjamin Levin, Bonnie McKee
2010	Katy Perry	Teenage Dream	"Teenage Dream"	Lukasz Gottwald, Katy Perry, Benjamin Levin, Bonnie McKee
2010	Katy Perry	Teenage Dream	"Last Friday Night (T.G.I.F.)"	Lukasz Gottwald, Bonnie McKee, Katy Perry
2010	Katy Perry	Teenage Dream	"The One That Got Away"	Lukasz Gottwald, Katy Perry
2010	Katy Perry	Teenage Dream	"E.T."	Lukasz Gottwald, Joshua Coleman, Katy Perry
2010	Taio Cruz	Rokstarr	"Dynamite"	Taio Cruz, Lukasz Gottwald, Benjamin Levin, Bonnie McKee
2010	Usher	Versus	"DJ Got Us Fallin' in Love"	Johan Schuster, Savan Kotecha, Armando Christian Pérez
2010	Pink	Greatest Hits... So Far!!!	"Raise Your Glass"	Alecia Moore, Johan Schuster
2010	Pink	Greatest Hits... So Far!!!	"Fuckin' Perfect"	Alecia Moore, Johan Schuster
2010	Linda Sundblad	Manifest	"Making Out"	Linda Sundblad
2010	Linda Sundblad	Manifest	"2 All My Girls"	Linda Sundblad, Alexander Kronlund
2010	Robyn	Body Talk	"Time Machine"	Robin Carlsson, Johan Schuster, Sophia Somajo
2010	Shayne Ward	Obsession	"Close to Close"	Arnthor Birgisson, Savan Kotecha
2011	Britney Spears	Femme Fatale	"Hold It Against Me"	Lukasz Gottwald, Bonnie McKee, Mathieu "Billboard" Jomphe-Lepine
2011	Britney Spears	Femme Fatale	"I Wanna Go"	Johan Schuster, Savan Kotecha
2011	Britney Spears	Femme Fatale	"Till the World Ends"	Alexander Kronlund, Kesha Sebert, Lukasz Gottwald
2011	Britney Spears	Femme Fatale	"Inside Out"	Lukasz Gottwald, Mathieu "Billboard" Jomphe-Lepine
2011	Britney Spears	Femme Fatale	"Seal It With a Kiss"	Lukasz Gottwald, Bonnie McKee, Henry Walter
2011	Britney Spears	Femme Fatale	"Criminal"	Johan Schuster, Tiffany Amber
2011	Britney Spears	Femme Fatale	"Up n' Down"	Johan Schuster, Savan Kotecha
2011	Miranda Cosgrove	High Maintenance	"Dancing Crazy"	Johan Schuster, Avril Lavigne
2011	Fireal	The Dark Side	"Breathe"	Per Aldeheim, Tuomas Miettinen, Caleb Daniel Lit
2011	Avril Lavigne	Goodbye Lullaby	"What the Hell"	Johan Schuster, Avril Lavigne
2011	Avril Lavigne	Goodbye Lullaby	"Wish You Were Here"	Johan Schuster, Avril Lavigne
2011	Avril Lavigne	Goodbye Lullaby	"Smile"	Johan Schuster, Avril Lavigne
2011	Avril Lavigne	Goodbye Lullaby	"I Love You"	Johan Schuster, Avril Lavigne
2011	Glee Cast	Glee: The Music, Volume 5	"Loser Like Me"	Adam Anders, Peer Åström, Savan Kotecha, Johan Schuster
2011	Glee Cast	Glee: The Music, Volume 6	"Light Up the World"	Adam Anders, Peer Åström, Johan Schuster, Savan Kotecha
2011	Those Dancing Days	Daydreams & Nightmares	"Can't Find Entrance"	Johan Schuster, Cecilia Efraimsson, Marianne Evrell, Linnea Jonsson, Rebecka Rolfart, Lisa Wirström
2011	BC Jean	Non-album single	"I'll Survive You"	Johan Schuster, Savan Kotecha
2011	BC Jean	Bc Jean Collection (unreleased)	"Hate Me" (unreleased)	Johan Schuster, Britney Jean Carlson
2011	Pitbull	Planet Pit	"Come N Go"	Armando Christian Pérez, Lukasz Gottwald, Benjamin Levin, Enrique Iglesias
2011	Cher Lloyd	Sticks + Stones	"With Ur Love"	Johan Schuster, Savan Kotecha
2011	Jessie J	Who You Are	"Domino"	Lukasz Gottwald, Claude Kelly, Jessica Cornish, Henry Walter
2011	Cervello	Cervello	"Cause I Am"	Alexandra Talomaa, Pierre Stenson, Rickard Eriksson, Sigvard Järrebring, Gunnar Lilja
2012	Katy Perry	Teenage Dream: The Complete Confection	"Part of Me"	Lukasz Gottwald, Bonnie McKee, Katy Perry
2012	Katy Perry	Teenage Dream: The Complete Confection	"Wide Awake"	Katy Perry, Lukasz Gottwald, Bonnie McKee, Henry Walter
2012	Nicki Minaj	Pink Friday: Roman Reloaded	"Va Va Voom"	Onika Maraj, Lukasz Gottwald, Allan Grigg, Henry Walter
2012	Nicki Minaj	Pink Friday: Roman Reloaded	"Masquerade"	Onika Maraj, Lukasz Gottwald, Benjamin Levin, Henry Walter
2012	Maroon 5	Overexposed	"One More Night"	Adam Levine, Johan Schuster, Savan Kotecha
2012	Maroon 5	Overexposed	"Daylight"	Adam Levine, Mason Levy, Sam Martin
2012	Usher	Looking 4 Myself	"Scream"	Johan Schuster, Savan Kotecha, Usher Raymond IV
2012	Justin Bieber	Believe	"Beauty and a Beat"	Savan Kotecha, Anton Zaslavski, Onika Maraj
2012	will.i.am	#willpower	"This Is Love"	Eva Simons, William Adams, Steve Angello, Sebastian Ingrosso, Mike Hamilton
2012	Taio Cruz	TY.O	"Fast Car"	Taio Cruz, Klas Åhlund, Alexander Kronlund, Usher Raymond IV, Adam Baptiste
2012	Pink	The Truth About Love	"Slut Like You"	Alecia Moore, Johan Schuster
2012	Taylor Swift	Red	"We Are Never Ever Getting Back Together"	Taylor Swift, Johan Schuster
2012	Taylor Swift	Red	"22"	Taylor Swift, Johan Schuster
2012	Taylor Swift	Red	"I Knew You Were Trouble"	Taylor Swift, Johan Schuster
2012	Christina Aguilera	Lotus	"Your Body"	Tiffany Amber, Savan Kotecha, Johan Schuster
2012	Christina Aguilera	Lotus	"Let There Be Love"	Johan Schuster, Savan Kotecha, Bonnie McKee, Oliver Goldstein, Oscar Holter, Jakke Erixson
2012	Carly Rae Jepsen	Kiss	"Tonight I'm Getting Over You"	Carly Rae Jepsen, Lukas Hilbert, Clarence Coffee Jr, Shiloh Hoganson, Katerina "Tryna" Loules
2012	Kesha	Warrior	"Warrior"	Kesha Sebert, Pebe Sebert, Lukasz Gottwald, Henry Walter
2012	Kesha	Warrior	"C'Mon"	Kesha Sebert, Lukasz Gottwald, Benjamin Levin, Bonnie McKee, Henry Walter
2012	Kesha	Warrior	"Wherever You Are"	Kesha Sebert, Lukasz Gottwald, Henry Walter
2012	Kesha	Warrior	"Only Wanna Dance with You"	Kesha Sebert, Lukasz Gottwald, Henry Walter
2012	Kesha	Warrior	"Supernatural"	Kesha Sebert, Lukasz Gottwald, Benjamin Levin, Nik Kershaw, Henry Walter
2012	Kesha	Warrior	"All That Matters (The Beautiful Life)"	Kesha Sebert, Lukas Hilbert, Savan Kotecha, Alexander Kronlund, Johan Schuster
2013	Becky G	Play It Again EP	"Play It Again"	Rebbeca Marie Gomez, Joshua Coleman, Lukasz Gottwald, Niles Hollowell-Dhar, Henry Walter
2013	Becky G	Play It Again EP	"Can't Get Enough" ft. Pitbull	Rebbeca Marie Gomez, Armando C. Perez, Niles Hollowell-Dhar, Tzvetin Todorov, Gregor Salto, Lukasz Gottwald, Urales Vargas, Henry Walter
2013	Backstreet Boys	In a World Like This	"In a World Like This"	Kristian Lundin, Savan Kotecha
2013	Cassadee Pope	Frame by Frame	"Easier to Lie"	Savan Kotecha, Johan Schuster
2013	Emblem3	Nothing to Lose	"Nothing to Lose"	Johan Carlsson, Jacob Kasher Hindlin, Marco Borrero
2013	G.R.L.	Music from and Inspired by The Smurfs 2	"Vacation"	Lukasz Gottwald, Henry Walter, Bonnie McKee
2013	Katy Perry	Prism	"Roar"	Katy Perry, Lukasz Gottwald, Bonnie McKee, Henry Walter
2013	Katy Perry	Prism	"Legendary Lovers"	Katy Perry, Lukasz Gottwald, Bonnie McKee, Henry Walter
2013	Katy Perry	Prism	"Birthday"	Katy Perry, Lukasz Gottwald, Bonnie McKee, Henry Walter
2013	Katy Perry	Prism	"Walking on Air"	Katy Perry, Klas Åhlund, Caméla Leierth, Adam Baptiste
2013	Katy Perry	Prism	"Unconditionally"	Katy Perry, Lukasz Gottwald, Henry Walter
2013	Katy Perry	Prism	"Dark Horse"	Katy Perry, Jordan Houston, Lukasz Gottwald, Sarah Hudson, Henry Walter
2013	Katy Perry	Prism	"This Is How We Do"	Katy Perry, Klas Åhlund
2013	Katy Perry	Prism	"International Smile"	Katy Perry, Lukasz Gottwald, Henry Walter
2013	Katy Perry	Prism	"Ghost"	Katy Perry, Lukasz Gottwald, Bonnie McKee, Henry Walter
2013	Katy Perry	Prism	"Love Me"	Katy Perry, Christian Karlsson, Vincent Pontare, Magnus Lidehäll
2014	Cher Lloyd	Sorry I'm Late	"Dirty Love"	Cher Lloyd, Savan Kotecha, Johan Schuster, Jakob Jerlström, Ludvig Söderberg
2014	MKTO	MKTO	"Forever Until Tomorrow"	Carl Falk, Rami Yacoub, Savan Kotecha, Emanuel Kiriakou, Evan Bogart
2014	G.R.L.	G.R.L.	"Show Me What You Got"	Lukasz Gottwald, Henry Walter, Jacob Kasher Hindlin
2014	G.R.L.	G.R.L.	"Rewind"	Lukasz Gottwald, Henry Walter, Ammar Malik, Jacob Kasher Hindlin
2014	Pitbull	Globalization	"Wild Wild Love"	Lukasz Gottwald, Henry Walter, Ammar Malik, Armando Christian Pérez, Alexander Castillo Vasquez
2014	Shakira	Shakira	"Dare (La La La)"	Shakira Isabel Mebarak Ripoll, Lukasz Gottwald, Mathieu "Billboard" Jomphe-Lepine, Henry Walter, Jay Singh, Raelene Arreguin, John J. Conte Jr.
2014	Zlatan	Non-album single	"Du Gamla Du Fria" ft. Day (Doris Sandberg)	Traditional, Joakim Jarl, Jimmy Koitzsch, Linus Eklöw
2014	Ariana Grande	My Everything	"Problem"	Ilya Salmanzadeh, Amethyst Kelly, Savan Kotecha
2014	Ariana Grande	My Everything	"Break Free"	Savan Kotecha, Anton Zaslavski
2014	Ariana Grande	My Everything	"Love Me Harder"	Almad Balshe, Savan Kotecha, Abel Tesfaye, Peter Svensson, Ali Payami
2014	Ariana Grande	My Everything	"Bang Bang"	Rickard Göransson, Savan Kotecha, Onika Maraj
2014	Jennifer Lopez	A.K.A.	"First Love"	Savan Kotecha, Ilya Salmanzadeh
2014	Wrabel		"All My Friends"	Stephen Wrabel, Drew Pearson
2014	Jessie J	Sweet Talker	"Bang Bang"	Rickard Göransson, Savan Kotecha, Onika Maraj
2014	Taylor Swift	1989	"Blank Space"	Taylor Swift, Johan Schuster
2014	Taylor Swift	1989	"Style"	Taylor Swift, Johan Schuster, Ali Payami
2014	Taylor Swift	1989	"All You Had to Do Was Stay"	Taylor Swift
2014	Taylor Swift	1989	"Shake It Off"	Taylor Swift, Johan Schuster
2014	Taylor Swift	1989	"Bad Blood"	Taylor Swift, Kendrick Lamar, Johan Schuster
2014	Taylor Swift	1989	"How You Get the Girl"	Taylor Swift, Johan Schuster
2014	Taylor Swift	1989	"Wildest Dreams"	Taylor Swift, Johan Schuster
2014	Taylor Swift	1989	"Wonderland"	Taylor Swift, Johan Schuster
2014	Taylor Swift	1989	"New Romantics"	Taylor Swift, Johan Schuster
2014	Sharks (DJ duo)		"Wait"	Joakim Jarl, Svidden, Linus Eklöw, Jonnali Parmenius, Johan Sigerud, Marcus Grindebäck, Sophia Englund, Susanna Friberg
2015	Electric Callboy	Crystals	"Baby (T.U.M.H.)"	Kristian Lundin, Sebastian "Sushi" Biesler, Kevin Ratajczak, Daniel Haniß, Pascal Schillo, Daniel Klossek, David Friedrich
2015	Usher	UR [Unreleased]	"Bedroom" [Unreleased]	Usher Raymond IV, Ilya Salmanzadeh, Savan Kotecha
2015	Kevin McHale	Gemini	"Realize"	Savan Kotecha, Ilya Salmanzadeh, Ester Dean, Rickard Göransson
2015	Luigi Masi	TBA	"On Fire"	Savan Kotecha, Ali Payami, Bebe Rexha
2015	Tori Kelly	Unbreakable Smile	"Nobody Love"	Victoria Kelly, Savan Kotecha, Rickard Göransson
2015	Tori Kelly	Unbreakable Smile	"California Lovers" (ft. LL Cool J)	Victoria Kelly, Savan Kotecha, Rickard Göransson, Ali Payami, James Todd Smith
2015	Tori Kelly	Unbreakable Smile	"Falling Slow"	Victoria Kelly, Johan Carlsson
2015	Robin Thicke	Non-album single	"Back Together" ft. Nicki Minaj	Robin Thicke, Onika Maraj, Savan Kotecha, Ali Payami
2015	Adam Lambert	The Original High	"Ghost Town"	Adam Lambert, Sterling Fox, Ali Payami, Tobias Karlsson
2015	Adam Lambert	The Original High	"Another Lonely Night"	Adam Lambert, Sterling Fox, Ali Payami
2015	The Weeknd	Beauty Behind the Madness	"Can't Feel My Face"	Abel Tesfaye, Savan Kotecha, Ali Payami, Peter Svensson
2015	The Weeknd	Beauty Behind the Madness	"In the Night"	Abel Tesfaye, Savan Kotecha, Ali Payami, Peter Svensson, Almad Balshe
2015	Natalie La Rose	Non-album single	"Around the World" ft. Fetty Wap	Ilya Salmanzadeh, Savan Kotecha, Rickard Göransson, Marco Borrero, Justin Franks, Willie Maxwell
2015	Demi Lovato	Confident	"Cool for the Summer"	Demetria Lovato, Alexander Kronlund, Savan Kotecha, Ali Payami
2015	Demi Lovato	Confident	"Confident"	Demetria Lovato, Ilya Salmanzadeh, Savan Kotecha
2015	Selena Gomez	Revival	"Hands to Myself"	Julia Michaels, Justin Tranter, Robin Fredriksson, Mattias Larsson, Selena Gomez
2015	Ellie Goulding	Delirium	"On My Mind"	Elena Jane Goulding, Savan Kotecha, Ilya Salmanzadeh
2015	Ellie Goulding	Delirium	"Codes"	Elena Jane Goulding, Savan Kotecha, Ilya Salmanzadeh
2015	Ellie Goulding	Delirium	"Love Me Like You Do"	Savan Kotecha, Ilya Salmanzadeh, Ali Payami, Tove Nilsson (Tove Lo)
2015	Ellie Goulding	Delirium	"Don't Need Nobody"	Elena Jane Goulding, Savan Kotecha, Peter Svensson, Ludvig Söderberg, Jakob Jerlström
2015	Ellie Goulding	Delirium	"Army"	Elena Jane Goulding, Savan Kotecha, Ali Payami
2015	Ellie Goulding	Delirium	"Lost and Found"	Elena Jane Goulding, Laleh Pourkarim, Carl Falk, Joakim Berg
2015	Adele	25	"Send My Love (To Your New Lover)"	Adele Adkins, Johan Schuster
2016	Ariana Grande	Dangerous Woman	"Dangerous Woman"	Johan Carlsson, Ross Golan
2016	Ariana Grande	Dangerous Woman	"Into You"	Ariana Grande, Savan Kotecha, Alexander Kronlund, Ilya Salmanzadeh
2016	Ariana Grande	Dangerous Woman	"Side to Side"	Ariana Grande, Savan Kotecha, Alexander Kronlund, Onika Maraj, Ilya Salmanzadeh
2016	Ariana Grande	Dangerous Woman	"Greedy"	Savan Kotecha, Alexander Kronlund, Ilya Salmanzadeh
2016	Ariana Grande	Dangerous Woman	"Sometimes"	Savan Kotecha, Peter Svensson, Ilya Salmanzadeh
2016	Ariana Grande	Dangerous Woman	"Bad Decisions"	Ariana Grande, Savan Kotecha, Ilya Salmanzadeh
2016	Ariana Grande	Dangerous Woman	"Touch It"	Savan Kotecha, Peter Svensson, Ali Payami
2016	Daye Jack	TBA	"350 Days"	Daye Jack, Ali Payami
2016	Frej Larsson	Non-album single	"Mitt Team" ft. Joy	Frej Larsson, Joy M'Batha, Johan Schuster, Oscar Holter
2016	Nick Jonas	Last Year Was Complicated	"Under You"	Savan Kotecha, Rickard Göransson, Ali Payami, Bebe Rexha
2016	Pink	Alice Through the Looking Glass	"Just Like Fire"	Alecia Moore, Johan Schuster, Oscar Holter
2016	Justin Timberlake	Trolls: Original Motion Picture Soundtrack	"Can't Stop the Feeling!"	Justin Timberlake, Johan Schuster
2016	Justin Timberlake	Trolls: Original Motion Picture Soundtrack	"Hair Up" with Gwen Stefani and Ron Funches	Justin Timberlake, Savan Kotecha, Johan Schuster, Oscar Holter
2016	Justin Timberlake	Trolls: Original Motion Picture Soundtrack	"What U Workin' With?" with Gwen Stefani	Justin Timberlake, Savan Kotecha, Peter Svensson, Ilya Salmanzadeh
2016	G-Eazy	Ghostbusters: Original Motion Picture Soundtrack	"Saw It Coming" ft. Jeremih	Peter Svensson, Savan Kotecha, Ali Payami, Gerald Earl Gillum, Ray Parker Jr.
2016	Katy Perry	Non-album single	"Rise"	Katheryn Hudson, Savan Kotecha, Ali Payami
2016	The Band Perry	My Bad Imagination	"Never Been Hurt"	Savan Kotecha, Rickard Göransson, Kimberly Perry, Neil Perry, Reid Perry
2016	The Weeknd	Starboy	"Rockin'"	Abel Tesfaye, Peter Svensson, Savan Kotecha, Ali Payami, Ahmad Balshe
2016	The Weeknd	Starboy	"Love to Lay"	Abel Tesfaye, Peter Svensson, Savan Kotecha, Ali Payami, Ahmad Balshe
2016	The Weeknd	Starboy	"A Lonely Night"	Abel Tesfaye, Peter Svensson, Savan Kotecha, Ali Payami, Ahmad Balshe, Jason Quenneville
2016	The Weeknd	Starboy	"Ordinary Life"	Abel Tesfaye, Peter Svensson, Savan Kotecha, Ali Payami, Ahmad Balshe, Martin McKinney, Henry Walter
2017	Katy Perry	Witness	"Chained to the Rhythm" (featuring Skip Marley)	Katheryn Hudson, Sia Furler, Ali Payami, Skip Marley
2017	Katy Perry	Witness	"Bon Appétit" (featuring Migos)	Katheryn Hudson, Quavious Keyate Marshall, Kirshnik Khari Ball, Kiari Kendrell Cephus, Johan Schuster, Oscar Holter, Ferras Alqaisi
2017	Katy Perry	Witness	"Witness"	Katheryn Hudson, Savan Kotecha, Ali Payami
2017	Katy Perry	Witness	"Hey Hey Hey"	Katheryn Hudson, Sia Furler, Ali Payami, Sarah Hudson
2017	Katy Perry	Witness	"Roulette"	Katheryn Hudson, Ali Payami, Johan Shuster, Ferras Alqaisi
2017	Lana Del Rey	Lust for Life	"Lust for Life" (featuring The Weeknd)	Elizabeth Grant, Rick Nowels, Abel Tesfaye
2017	Taylor Swift	Reputation	"...Ready For It?"	Taylor Swift, Johan Schuster, Ali Payami
2017	Taylor Swift	Reputation	"End Game" (featuring Ed Sheeran and Future)	Taylor Swift, Ed Sheeran, Johan Schuster, Nayvadius Wilburn
2017	Taylor Swift	Reputation	"I Did Something Bad"	Taylor Swift, Johan Schuster
2017	Taylor Swift	Reputation	"Don't Blame Me"	Taylor Swift, Johan Schuster
2017	Taylor Swift	Reputation	"Delicate"	Taylor Swift, Johan Schuster
2017	Taylor Swift	Reputation	"So It Goes..."	Taylor Swift, Johan Schuster, Oscar Görres
2017	Taylor Swift	Reputation	"Gorgeous"	Taylor Swift, Johan Schuster
2017	Taylor Swift	Reputation	"King of My Heart"	Taylor Swift, Johan Schuster
2017	Taylor Swift	Reputation	"Dancing With Our Hands Tied"	Taylor Swift, Johan Schuster, Oscar Holter
2017	Pink	Beautiful Trauma	"Revenge" (featuring Eminem)	Alecia Moore, Marshall Mathers, Johan Schuster
2017	Pink	Beautiful Trauma	"Whatever You Want"	Alecia Moore, Johan Schuster
2017	Pink	Beautiful Trauma	"For Now"	Alecia Moore, Julia Michaels, Robin Fredriksson, Mattias Larsson
2017	Pink	Beautiful Trauma	"Secrets"	Alecia Moore, Johan Schuster, Oscar Holter
2017	James Arthur	You	"Naked"	James Arthur, Johan Carlsson, Savan Kotecha
2018	Noah Cyrus	Non-album single	"We Are..." (featuring MØ)	Noah Cyrus, Savan Kotecha, Ali Payami
2018	Anne-Marie	Speak Your Mind	"2002"	Benjamin Levin, Julia Michaels, Steve Mac, Ed Sheeran, Anne-Marie Nicholson, Andreas Carlsson, George Clinton, El DeBarge, Randy DeBarge, Jay E, Ice-T, Etterlene Jordan, Kristian Lundin, Nelly Alphonso Henderson, Jake Schulze, City Spud
2018	Ariana Grande	Sweetener	"No Tears Left to Cry"	Ariana Grande, Savan Kotecha, Ilya Salmanzadeh
2018	Ariana Grande	Sweetener	"God Is a Woman"	Ariana Grande, Savan Kotecha, Ilya Salmanzadeh, Rickard Göransson
2018	Ariana Grande	Sweetener	"Everytime"	Ariana Grande, Savan Kotecha, Ilya Salmanzadeh
2018	PrettyMuch	PrettyMuch So Far...	"No More" (featuring French Montana)	Ludvig Söderberg, Oscar Görres, Peter Svensson, Savan Kotecha, Zion Kuwonu, Austin Porter, Brandon Arreaga, Edwin Honoret, Nick Mara, Karim Kharbouch
2019	Ariana Grande	Thank U, Next	"Bloodline"	Ariana Grande, Savan Kotecha, Ilya Salmanzadeh
2019	Ariana Grande	Thank U, Next	"Bad Idea"	Ariana Grande, Savan Kotecha, Ilya Salmanzadeh
2019	Ariana Grande	Thank U, Next	"Ghostin"	Ariana Grande, Victoria Monét, Savan Kotecha, Ilya Salmanzadeh
2019	Ariana Grande	Thank U, Next	"Break Up with Your Girlfriend, I'm Bored"	Ariana Grande, Savan Kotecha, Ilya Salmanzadeh, Kevin Briggs, Kandi Burruss-Tucker
2019	Pink	Hurts 2B Human	"(Hey Why) Miss You Sometime"	Alecia Moore, Johan Schuster
2019	Zac Brown Band	The Owl	"Finished What We Started (featuring Brandi Carlile)"	Zac Brown, Johan Carlsson, Peter Svensson, Savan Kotecha
2019	Ed Sheeran	No.6 Collaborations Project	"I Don't Care" (with Justin Bieber)	Ed Sheeran, Fred Again, Jason Boyd, Justin Bieber, Johan Schuster
2019	Ed Sheeran	No.6 Collaborations Project	"Beautiful People" (featuring Khalid)	Ed Sheeran, Khalid Robinson, Fred Again, Johan Schuster
2019	Ed Sheeran	No.6 Collaborations Project	"Remember the Name" (featuring Eminem and 50 Cent)	Ed Sheeran, Fred Again, Johan Schuster, Curtis Jackson, Marshall Mathers, Rico Wade, Ray Murray, Sleepy Brown, Big Boi, André 3000
2019	Ed Sheeran	No.6 Collaborations Project	"Take Me Back to London" (featuring Stormzy)	Ed Sheeran, Fred Again, Johan Schuster, Michael Omari Jr.
2019	Sam Smith	Love Goes	"How Do You Sleep?"	Sam Smith, Ilya Salmanzadeh, Savan Kotecha
2019	Normani	TBA	"Motivation"	Normani Hamilton, Ariana Grande, Ilya Salmanzadeh, Savan Kotecha
2019	Ariana Grande	Charlie's Angels: Original Motion Picture Soundtrack	"Don't Call Me Angel" (with Miley Cyrus and Lana Del Rey)	Ariana Grande, Miley Cyrus, Lana Del Rey, Ilya Salmanzadeh, Savan Kotecha, Alma-Sofia Miettinen
2019	Ariana Grande	Charlie's Angels: Original Motion Picture Soundtrack	"Bad to You" (featuring Normani and Nicki Minaj)	Ariana Grande, Ilya Salmanzadeh, Savan Kotecha, Onika Maraj, Brandon Hollemon
2019	Ariana Grande	Charlie's Angels: Original Motion Picture Soundtrack	"Nobody" (with Chaka Khan)	Ariana Grande, Ilya Salmanzadeh, Savan Kotecha
2019	Ariana Grande	Charlie's Angels: Original Motion Picture Soundtrack	"How I Look on You"	Ariana Grande, Ilya Salmanzadeh, Savan Kotecha
2019	Jessie J	& Juliet	"One More Try"	Ilya Salmanzadeh, Savan Kotecha, David West Read, Oscar Holter, Peter Svensson
2019	Tove Lo	Sunshine Kitty	"Mateo"	Tove Lo, Ludvig Söderberg, Jakob Jerlström
2019	Tove Lo	Sunshine Kitty	"Equally Lost" (featuring Doja Cat)	Tove Lo, Robin Fredriksson, Mattias Larsson, Amala Dlamin
2020	Various artists	Trolls World Tour: Original Motion Picture Soundtrack	"The Other Side" (Justin Timberlake, SZA)	Justin Timberlake, Ludwig Göransson, Sarah Aarons, Solana Rowe
2020	Various artists	Trolls World Tour: Original Motion Picture Soundtrack	"Just Sing" (Justin Timberlake, Anna Kendrick, Kelly Clarkson, Mary J. Blige, Anderson .Paak, Kenan Thompson and Kunal Nayyar )	Justin Timberlake, Ludwig Göransson, Sarah Aarons
2020	The Weeknd	After Hours	"Hardest to Love"	Abel Tesfaye, Oscar Holter
2020	The Weeknd	After Hours	"Scared To Live"	Abel Tesfaye, Oscar Holter, Ahmad Balshe, Daniel Lopatin, Elton John, Bernard Taupin
2020	The Weeknd	After Hours	"Blinding Lights"	Abel Tesfaye, Oscar Holter, Ahmad Balshe, Jason Quenneville
2020	The Weeknd	After Hours	"In Your Eyes"	Abel Tesfaye, Oscar Holter, Ahmad Balshe
2020	The Weeknd	After Hours	"Save Your Tears" (with Ariana Grande)	Abel Tesfaye, Oscar Holter, Ahmad Balshe, Jason Quenneville
2020	Lady Gaga	Chromatica	"Stupid Love"	Lady Gaga, BloodPop, Martin Bresso, Ely Rise
2021	Zara Larsson	Poster Girl	"Stick with You"	Zara Larsson, Savan Kotecha, Ludvig Söderberg, Jakob Jerlström, Max Wolfgang
2021	Coldplay	Music of the Spheres	"Higher Power"	Chris Martin, Guy Berryman, Jonny Buckland, Will Champion, Denise Carite, Federico Vindver
2021	Coldplay	Music of the Spheres	"Coloratura"	Martin, Berryman, Buckland, Champion, John Metcalfe, Paris Strother, Davide Rossi
2021	Coldplay	Music of the Spheres	"My Universe"	Martin, Berryman, Buckland, Champion, Oscar Holter, Suga, J-Hope, RM
2021	Coldplay	Music of the Spheres	"Music of the Spheres"	Martin, Berryman, Buckland, Champion, Daniel Green, Rik Simpson, Vindver, Bill Rahko
2021	Coldplay	Music of the Spheres	"Humankind"	Martin, Berryman, Buckland, Champion, Jon Hopkins, Stephen Fry, Green, Vindver, Holter
2021	Coldplay	Music of the Spheres	"Alien Choir"	Martin, Berryman, Buckland, Champion, Hopkins
2021	Coldplay	Music of the Spheres	"Let Somebody Go" (with Selena Gomez)	Chris Martin, Berryman, Buckland, Champion, Apple Martin, Livvi Franc, Holter, Rahko, Metro Boomin
2021	Coldplay	Music of the Spheres	"Human Heart" (with We Are King & Jacob Collier)	Martin, Berryman, Buckland, Champion, Amber Strother, Paris Strother, Collier
2021	Coldplay	Music of the Spheres	"People of the Pride"	Martin, Berryman, Buckland, Champion, Jesse Rogg, Sam Sparro, Derek Dixie, Rahko
2021	Coldplay	Music of the Spheres	"Biutyful"	Martin, Berryman, Buckland, Champion, Holter, Rossi
2021	Coldplay	Music of the Spheres	"Music of the Spheres II"	Martin, Berryman, Buckland, Champion
2021	Coldplay	Music of the Spheres	"Infinity Sign"	Martin, Berryman, Buckland, Champion, Hopkins
2021	Anne-Marie	Therapy	"Beautiful"	Ed Sheeran, Elvira Anderfjärd
2021	Jonas Brothers	Non-album single	"Who's in Your Head"	Joe Jonas, Nick Jonas, Kevin Jonas, Ilya Salmanzadeh, Rami Yacoub, David Stewart
2021	Taylor Swift	1989 (Taylor's Version)	"Wildest Dreams (Taylor's Version)"	Taylor Swift, Johan Schuster
2021	Taylor Swift	Red (Taylor's Version)	"I Knew You Were Trouble (Taylor's Version)"	Taylor Swift, Johan Schuster
2021	Taylor Swift	Red (Taylor's Version)	"22 (Taylor's Version)"	Taylor Swift, Johan Schuster
2021	Taylor Swift	Red (Taylor's Version)	"We Are Never Ever Getting Back Together (Taylor's Version)"	Taylor Swift, Johan Schuster
2021	Taylor Swift	Red (Taylor's Version)	"Message in a Bottle"	Taylor Swift, Johan Schuster
2021	FLETCHER	Non-album single	"Girls Girls Girls"	Cathy Dennis, FLETCHER, Łukasz Sebastian "Dr. Luke" Gottwald, Jonas W. Karlsson, Kito, Madison Love, Katy Perry, Mary Weitz
2021	Adele	30	"Can I Get It"	Adele Laurie Blue Adkins, Karl Johan "Shellback" Schuster
2022	The Weeknd	Dawn FM	"Gasoline"	Abel Tesfaye, Oscar Holter
2022	The Weeknd	Dawn FM	"How Do I Make You Love Me?"	Abel Tesfaye, Daniel Lopatin, Axel Hedfors, Oscar Holter, Sebastian Ingrosso, Steven Angello, Matt Cohn
2022	The Weeknd	Dawn FM	"Take My Breath"	Abel Tesfaye, Oscar Holter, Ahmad Balshe
2022	The Weeknd	Dawn FM	"Sacrifice"	Abel Tesfaye, Axel Hedfors, Carl Nordström, Kevin McCord, Oscar Holter, Sebastian Ingrosso, Steven Angello
2022	The Weeknd	Dawn FM	"Out of Time"	Abel Tesfaye, Oscar Holter
2022	The Weeknd	Dawn FM	"Don't Break My Heart"	Abel Tesfaye, Daniel Lopatin, Oscar Holter, Matt Cohn
2022	The Weeknd	Dawn FM	"Is There Someone Else?"	Abel Tesfaye, Oscar Holter
2022	The Weeknd	Dawn FM	"Less than Zero"	Abel Tesfaye, Oscar Holter
2022	The Weeknd	Dawn FM	"Phantom Regret by Jim"	Abel Tesfaye, Jim Carrey, Daniel Lopatin, Oscar Holter, Matt Cohn
2022	Måneskin	RUSH!	"Supermodel"	Damiano David, Victoria De Angelis, Thomas Raggi, Sylvester Willy "SLY" Sivertsen, Ethan Torchio, Justin Drew Tranter, Rami Yacoub
2022	Dylan Conrique	TBA	"i miss you (skin to skin)"	Johan Jens Erik Carlsson, Dylan Shea Conrique, Maureen Anne "Mozella" McDonald
2022	Lizzo	Special	"Special"	Daoud Ayodele Miles Anthony, Melissa Viviane "Lizzo" Jefferson, Ian Eric Kirkpatrick, Theron Makiel Thomas, Andrew Dexter "Pop" Wansel
2022	Lizzo	Special	"Grrrls"	Adam Keefe "Ad-Rock" Horovitz, Melissa Viviane "Lizzo" Jefferson, Benjamin Joseph "benny blanco" Levin, Frederick Jay "Rick" Rubin, Ilya Salmanzadeh, Blake Slatkin, Theron Makiel Thomas, Andrew Dexter "Pop" Wansel
2022	Lizzo	Special	"2 Be Loved (Am I Ready)"	Melissa Viviane "Lizzo" Jefferson, Savan Harish Kotecha, Ilya Salmanzadeh, Anders Peter Svensson
2022	Max Martin	Promotional Track for StemDrop	"Red Lights"	Savan Harish Kotecha & Ali Payami
2022	P!nk	Trustfall	"Never Gonna Not Dance Again"	Alecia Beth "P!nk" Moore, Karl Johan "Shellback" Schuster
2022	Kim Petras	Non-album single	"If Jesus Was a Rockstar"	Omer Fedi, Savan Harish Kotecha, Kim Petras, Ilya Salmanzadeh, Anders Peter Svensson
2023	Sigala	Every Cloud - Silver Linings	"Radio" with MNEK	Bruce Fielder, Steven Manovski, Joakim Jarl, Uzoechi Emenike
2023	Måneskin	Rush!	"Baby Said"	Damiano David, Victoria De Angelis, Thomas Raggi, Sylvester Willy "SLY" Sivertsen, Ethan Torchio, Justin Drew Tranter, Rami Yacoub
2023	Måneskin	Rush!	"Don't Wanna Sleep"	Damiano David, Victoria De Angelis, Thomas Raggi, Sylvester Willy "SLY" Sivertsen, Ethan Torchio, Justin Drew Tranter, Rami Yacoub
2023	Måneskin	Rush!	"If Not for You"	Damiano David, Victoria De Angelis, Savan Harish Kotecha, Thomas Raggi, Sylvester Willy "SLY" Sivertsen, Ethan Torchio, Justin Drew Tranter, Rami Yacoub
2023	Lizzo & SZA	Non-album single	"Special (Remix)"	Daoud Ayodele Miles Anthony, Melissa Viviane "Lizzo" Jefferson, Ian Eric Kirkpatrick, Theron Makiel Thomas, Andrew Dexter "Pop" Wansel
2023	Ed Sheeran	-	"Eyes Closed"	Frederick John Philip "Fred again.." Gibson, Karl Johan "Shellback" Schuster, Edward Christopher "Ed" Sheeran
2023	Lewis Capaldi	Broken by Desire to Be Heavenly Sent	"Leave Me Slowly"	Lewis Marc Capaldi, Max Paul Albert "Fat Max Gsus" Grahn, Oscar Thomas Holter, Savan Harish Kotecha
2023	Kim Petras	Feed the Beast	"Thousand Pieces"	Łukasz Sebastian "Dr. Luke" Gottwald, Max Paul Albert "Fat Max Gsus" Grahn, Anne Linnet, Kim Petras
2023	Ed Sheeran	Non-album single	"A Beautiful Game"	Oscar Michael "OZGO" Görres, Edward Christopher "Ed" Sheeran, Foy Vance
2023	Post Malone	Austin	"Sign Me Up"	Louis Russell Bell, Austin Richard "Post Malone" Post, William Thomas "Billy" Walsh, Rami Yacoub
2023	Post Malone	Austin	"Enough Is Enough"	Louis Russell Bell, Austin Richard "Post Malone" Post, William Thomas "Billy" Walsh, Rami Yacoub
2023	Taylor Swift	1989 (Taylor's Version)	"Blank Space (Taylor's Version)"	Taylor Swift, Johan Schuster
2023	Taylor Swift	1989 (Taylor's Version)	"Style (Taylor's Version)"	Taylor Swift, Johan Schuster, Ali Payami
2023	Taylor Swift	1989 (Taylor's Version)	"All You Had to Do Was Stay (Taylor's Version)"	Taylor Swift
2023	Taylor Swift	1989 (Taylor's Version)	"Shake It Off (Taylor's Version)"	Taylor Swift, Johan Schuster
2023	Taylor Swift	1989 (Taylor's Version)	"Bad Blood (Taylor's Version)"	Taylor Swift, Johan Schuster
2023	Taylor Swift	1989 (Taylor's Version)	"How You Get the Girl (Taylor's Version)"	Taylor Swift, Johan Schuster
2023	Taylor Swift	1989 (Taylor's Version)	"Wonderland (Taylor's Version)"	Taylor Swift, Johan Schuster
2023	Taylor Swift	1989 (Taylor's Version)	"New Romantics (Taylor's Version)"	Taylor Swift, Johan Schuster
2023	Taylor Swift	1989 (Taylor's Version)	"Bad Blood (Taylor's Version)" ft. Kendrick Lamar	Taylor Swift, Johan Schuster, Kendrick Lamar
2023	Conan Gray	Found Heaven	"Never Ending Song"	Conan Lee Gray, Ilya Salmanzadeh
2023	Conan Gray	Found Heaven	"Killing Me"	Conan Lee Gray, Oscar Thomas Holter
2024	Conan Gray	Found Heaven	"Lonely Dancers"	Conan Lee Gray, Oscar Thomas Holter, Ilya Salmanzadeh
2024	Conan Gray	Found Heaven	"Fainted Love"	Conan Lee Gray
2024	Conan Gray	Found Heaven	"The Final Fight"	Conan Lee Gray, Oscar Thomas Holter, Ilya Salmanzadeh
2024	Conan Gray	Found Heaven	"Miss You"	Conan Lee Gray, Oscar Thomas Holter
2024	Conan Gray	Found Heaven	"Boys & Girls"	Conan Lee Gray, Oscar Thomas Holter
2024	Ariana Grande	Eternal Sunshine	"Yes, And?"	Ariana Grande-Butera, Ilya Salmanzadeh
2024	Ariana Grande	Eternal Sunshine	"Bye"	Ariana Grande, Ilya Salmanzadeh
2024	Ariana Grande	Eternal Sunshine	"Don't Wanna Break Up Again"	Ariana Grande, Ilya Salmanzadeh
2024	Ariana Grande	Eternal Sunshine	"Saturn Returns Interlude"	Ariana Grande, Diana Garland, Ilya Salmanzadeh
2024	Ariana Grande	Eternal Sunshine	"Eternal Sunshine"	Ariana Grande, David "Davidior" Park, Shintaro Yasuda
2024	Ariana Grande	Eternal Sunshine	"Supernatural"	Ariana Grande, Oscar Görres
2024	Ariana Grande	Eternal Sunshine	"True Story"	Ariana Grande
2024	Ariana Grande	Eternal Sunshine	"The Boy Is Mine"	Ariana Grande, David "Davidior" Park, Shintaro Yasuda
2024	Ariana Grande	Eternal Sunshine	"We Can't Be Friends (Wait for Your Love)"	Ariana Grande, Ilya Salmanzadeh
2024	Ariana Grande	Eternal Sunshine	"Imperfect for You"	Ariana Grande, Peter Karl Wilhelm Kahm, Ilya Salmanzadeh
2024	Ariana Grande	Eternal Sunshine (Slightly Deluxe)	"Supernatural" (remix; with Troye Sivan)	Ariana Grande-Butera, Oscar Michael "OZGO" Görres, Brett Leland McLaughlin, Troye Sivan Mellet
2024	Ariana Grande	Eternal Sunshine (Slightly Deluxe)	"Imperfect for You (Acoustic)"	Ariana Grande-Butera, Peter Karl Wilhelm Kahm, Ilya Salmanzadeh
2024	Ariana Grande	Eternal Sunshine (Slightly Deluxe)	"True Story (A Capella)"	Ariana Grande-Butera
2024	Ariana Grande	Eternal Sunshine (Slightly Deluxe)	"Yes, And?" (remix; with Mariah Carey)	Mariah Carey, Ariana Grande, Ilya Salmanzadeh
2024	Between Friends	garage sale	"Drive over me"	Brandon James Hudson, Savannah Jo Hudson, Luka Teresa Kloser
2024	Bonnie McKee	Hot City	"Everything but You"	Joakim "Jocke" Åhlund, Bonnie Leigh McKee, John Stuart "Johnnie" Newman
2024	Coldplay	Moon Music	"feelslikeimfallinginlove"	Guy Berryman, Jonny Buckland, Will Champion, Chris Martin, Apple Martin, Jon Hopkins, Tim Rutili
2024	Coldplay	Moon Music	"We Pray" (feat. Little Simz, Burna Boy, Elyanna & Tini)	Guy Berryman, Jonny Buckland, Will Champion, Chris Martin, Ilya Salmanzadeh, Shawn Carter, Simbiatu Ajikawo, Damini Ogulu, Elian Marjieh, Martina Stoessel
2024	Coldplay	Moon Music	"Jupiter"	Guy Berryman, Jonny Buckland, Will Champion, Chris Martin, Moses Martin, Olivia Waithe, Jacob Collier, Ilya Salmanzadeh, Orlando le Fleming
2024	Coldplay	Moon Music	"IAAM"	Guy Berryman, Jonny Buckland, Will Champion, Chris Martin, Oscar Holter
2024	Childish Gambino	Bando Stone & the New World	"Lithonia"	Donald McKinley "Childish Gambino" Glover Jr., Ludwig Emil Tomas Göransson, Riley Stephen Mackin, Michael Chinomso Uzowuru
2024	Childish Gambino	Bando Stone & the New World	"A Place Where Love Goes"	Donald McKinley "Childish Gambino" Glover Jr., Ludwig Emil Tomas Göransson, Oscar Thomas Holter, Dacoury Dahi "DJ Dahi" Natche
2024	Lisa	Alter Ego	"New Woman" (featuring Rosalía)	Lisa, Rosalía Vila Tobella, Ilya, Tove Burman, Tove Lo
2024	The Weeknd	Non-album single	"Dancing in the Flames"	Abel Tesfaye, Oscar Holter
2025	The Weeknd	Hurry Up Tomorrow	"Open Hearts"	Abel Tesfaye, Oscar Holter
2025	The Weeknd	Hurry Up Tomorrow	"Give Me Mercy"	Abel Tesfaye, Oscar Holter
2025	The Weeknd	Hurry Up Tomorrow (First Pressing)	"Runaway"	Abel Tesfaye, Oscar Holter, Ilya Salmanzadeh
2025	The Weeknd	Hurry Up Tomorrow (First Pressing)	"Society"	Abel Tesfaye, Oscar Holter
2025	Ela Taubert	Non-album single	"¿Es En Serio?"	Kevin Augusto Aguirre Buitrago, Pio Felipe Perilla Cleves, Ela Taubert, Rami Yacoub
2025	Between Friends	Wow!	"American Bitch"	Brandon Hudson, Savannah Hudson
2025	Between Friends	Wow!	"XD"	Brandon Hudson, Jonathon Ng, Savannah Hudson
2025	Taylor Swift	The Life of a Showgirl	"The Fate of Ophelia"	Taylor Swift, Shellback
2025	Taylor Swift	The Life of a Showgirl	"Elizabeth Taylor"	Taylor Swift, Shellback
2025	Taylor Swift	The Life of a Showgirl	"Opalite"	Taylor Swift, Shellback
2025	Taylor Swift	The Life of a Showgirl	"Father Figure"	Taylor Swift, Shellback, George Michael
2025	Taylor Swift	The Life of a Showgirl	"Eldest Daughter"	Taylor Swift, Shellback
2025	Taylor Swift	The Life of a Showgirl	"Ruin the Friendship"	Taylor Swift, Shellback
2025	Taylor Swift	The Life of a Showgirl	"Actually Romantic"	Taylor Swift, Shellback
2025	Taylor Swift	The Life of a Showgirl	"Wi$h Li$t"	Taylor Swift, Shellback
2025	Taylor Swift	The Life of a Showgirl	"Wood"	Taylor Swift, Shellback
2025	Taylor Swift	The Life of a Showgirl	"CANCELLED!"	Taylor Swift, Shellback
2025	Taylor Swift	The Life of a Showgirl	"Honey"	Taylor Swift, Shellback
2025	Taylor Swift	The Life of a Showgirl	"The Life of a Showgirl" (feat. Sabrina Carpenter)	Taylor Swift, Shellback
2025	Debbii Dawson	TBA	"I Want You"	Debbii Dawson, Elvira Anderfjärd, Luka Kloser, Rami Yacoub
2026	Robyn	Sexistential	"Talk to Me"	Klas Åhlund, Oscar Holter, Robyn Carlsson
2026	Robyn	Sexistential	"Into the Sun"	Klas Åhlund, Oscar Holter, Robyn Carlsson
2026	Kenny Whitmire	Fool In a King Sized Bed	"One Foot in the Grave"	Kenny Whitmire, Thomas Mirels
2026	Ariana Grande	Petal	"Hate That I Made You Love Me"	Ariana Grande, Ilya Salmanzadeh
2026	Ariana Grande	Petal	"Petal"	Ariana Grande, Ilya Salmanzadeh
2026	Ariana Grande	Petal	"Stay"	Ariana Grande, Ilya Salmanzadeh
2026	Swedish House Mafia	TBA	"Happiness Is So Sad" (with Lykke Li)	Axel Hedfors, Sebastian Ingrosso, Steve Angello, Fred Again, Marco Parisi, Giampaolo Parisi, Lykke Li, Oscar Holter, Yaroslav Polikarpov

== Productions and co-productions ==
Year	Artist	Album	Song	Co-produced with
1994	Army of Lovers	Glory, Glamour and Gold	"Sexual Revolution"	Denniz Pop
1994	E-Type	Made in Sweden	"This Is the Way"	Denniz Pop
1994	E-Type	Made in Sweden	"Fight It Back"	Denniz Pop
1994	E-Type	Made in Sweden	"Do You Always (Have to Be Alone)?"	Amadin (John Amatiello & Kristian Lundin)
1994	E-Type	Made in Sweden	"Russian Lullaby"	E-Type
1994	E-Type	Made in Sweden	"Me No Want Miseria (Take Me to the End)"	Denniz Pop
1995	3T	Brotherhood	"Gotta Be You" (featuring Herbie)	Denniz Pop
1995	3T	Brotherhood	"I Need You"	Denniz Pop
1995	Ace of Base	The Bridge	"Beautiful Life"	Denniz Pop
1995	Ace of Base	The Bridge	"Never Gonna Say I'm Sorry"	Denniz Pop
1995	Ace of Base	The Bridge	"Lucky Love"	Denniz Pop
1995	Ace of Base	The Bridge	"Blooming 18"	Denniz Pop
1995	Herbie	Fingers	"Right Type of Mood"	Denniz Pop
1995	Herbie	Fingers	"Pick It Up"	Denniz Pop
1995	Herbie	Fingers	"Big Funky Dealer"	Denniz Pop
1995	Herbie	Fingers	"I Believe"	Denniz Pop
1995	Herbie	Fingers	"Rainbow Child"	Denniz Pop
1995	Herbie	Fingers	"Come Together"	Denniz Pop
1995	Herbie	Fingers	"The Skank"	Denniz Pop
1995	Herbie	Fingers	"Gangs to the Max"	Denniz Pop
1995	Herbie	Fingers	"Change"	Denniz Pop
1995	Rednex	Sex & Violins	"Wish You Were Here"	Denniz Pop
1996	Backstreet Boys	Backstreet Boys	"Quit Playing Games (With My Heart)"	Kristian Lundin
1996	Backstreet Boys	Backstreet Boys	"I Wanna Be with You"	Denniz Pop
1996	Backstreet Boys	Backstreet Boys	"Nobody But You"	Denniz Pop
1996	Backstreet Boys	Backstreet Boys	"We've Got It Goin' On"	Denniz Pop
1996	E-Type	The Explorer	"Free Like a Flying Demon"	Denniz Pop
1996	E-Type	The Explorer	"I'm Not Alone"	Denniz Pop, E-Type
1996	E-Type	The Explorer	"We Gotta Go"	Denniz Pop
1996	E-Type	The Explorer	"You Know"	
1996	George Shahin	All the Way	"Up 'n Down"	Denniz Pop
1996	George Shahin	All the Way	"The Things You Do"	Denniz Pop
1996	Leila K	Manic Panic	"Electric"	Denniz Pop
1996	Leila K	Manic Panic	"Blacklisted"	Denniz Pop
1996	Leila K	Manic Panic	"C'Mon Now"	Denniz Pop
1996	Leila K	Manic Panic	"Rude Boy"	Denniz Pop
1997	Backstreet Boys	Backstreet's Back	"Everybody (Backstreet's Back)"	Denniz Pop
1997	Backstreet Boys	Backstreet's Back	"As Long as You Love Me"	Kristian Lundin
1997	Backstreet Boys	Backstreet's Back	"10,000 Promises"	Denniz Pop
1997	Backstreet Boys	Backstreet's Back	"That's the Way I Like It"	Denniz Pop
1997	DeDe	I Do	"Get to You"	Per Magnusson, David Kreuger, Kristian Lundin
1997	Robyn	Robyn Is Here	"Show Me Love"	Denniz Pop
1998	5ive	5ive	"Don't You Want It"	Denniz Pop
1998	5ive	5ive	"It's the Things You Do"	Jake Schulze
1998	5ive	5ive	"Until the Time Is Through"	Kristian Lundin
1998	5ive	5ive	"Slam Dunk (Da Funk)"	Denniz Pop, Jake Schulze
1998	N'Sync	*NSYNC	"I Want You Back"	Denniz Pop
1998	E-Type	Last Man Standing	"Angels Crying"	Kristian Lundin, E-Type
1998	E-Type	Last Man Standing	"Here I Go Again"	Kristian Lundin, E-Type
1998	Gary Barlow	Open Road	"Superhero"	Kristian Lundin
1998	Jessica Folcker	Jessica	"A Little Bit Longer"	Denniz Pop
1998	Jessica Folcker	Jessica	"Goodbye"	Denniz Pop
1998	Jessica Folcker	Jessica	"Private Eye"	Denniz Pop
1998	Jessica Folcker	Jessica	"Tell Me What You Like"	Denniz Pop, Kristian Lundin
1998	Jessica Folcker	Jessica	"Turned and Walked Away"	Jake Schulze
1999	Backstreet Boys	Millennium	"I Want It That Way"	Kristian Lundin
1999	Backstreet Boys	Millennium	"Don't Wanna Lose You Now"	Rami Yacoub
1999	Backstreet Boys	Millennium	"Don't Want You Back"	Rami Yacoub
1999	Backstreet Boys	Millennium	"It's Gotta Be You"	Rami Yacoub
1999	Backstreet Boys	Millennium	"Larger Than Life (Single Mix)"	Rami Yacoub
1999	Backstreet Boys	Millennium	"Show Me the Meaning of Being Lonely"	Kristian Lundin
1999	Backstreet Boys	Millennium	"The One"	Kristian Lundin
1999	Britney Spears	...Baby One More Time	"...Baby One More Time"	Denniz Pop, Rami Yacoub
1999	Britney Spears	...Baby One More Time	"(You Drive Me) Crazy"	David Kreuger, Per Magnusson
1999	Britney Spears	...Baby One More Time	"(You Drive Me) Crazy (The Stop Remix)"	Rami Yacoub
1999	Britney Spears	...Baby One More Time	"I Will Be There"	Rami Yacoub
1999	Céline Dion	All the Way... A Decade of Song	"That's the Way It Is"	Kristian Lundin
1999	Gary Barlow	Twelve Months, Eleven Days	"For All That You Want"	Kristian Lundin
2000	Backstreet Boys	Black & Blue	"Get Another Boyfriend"	Rami Yacoub
2000	Backstreet Boys	Black & Blue	"Shape of My Heart"	Rami Yacoub
2000	Backstreet Boys	Black & Blue	"The Call"	Rami Yacoub
2000	Britney Spears	Oops!... I Did It Again	"Oops!... I Did It Again"	Rami Yacoub
2000	Britney Spears	Oops!... I Did It Again	"Lucky"	Rami Yacoub
2000	Britney Spears	Oops!... I Did It Again	"Stronger"	Rami Yacoub
2000	Britney Spears	Oops!... I Did It Again	"Where Are You Now"	Rami Yacoub
2001	E-Type	Euro IV Ever	"Life" (featuring Nana Hedin)	John Amatiello, Rami Yacoub, Kristian Lundin

=== Maratone/MXM/Wolf Cousins ===
Year	Artist	Album	Song	Co-produced with
2001	Britney Spears	Britney	"Overprotected"	Rami Yacoub
2001	Britney Spears	Britney	"Bombastic Love"	Rami Yacoub
2001	Britney Spears	Britney	"Cinderella"	Rami Yacoub, Britney Spears
2001	Britney Spears	Britney	"I'm Not a Girl, Not Yet a Woman"	Rami Yacoub
2002	Michael Bolton	Only a Woman like You	"Only a Woman like You"	Robert John "Mutt" Lange, Rami Yacoub
2002	Robyn	Don't Stop the Music	"O Baby"	Alexander Kronlund
2002	Nick Carter	Now or Never	"I Got You"	Rami Yacoub
2002	Nick Carter	Now or Never	"Blow Your Mind"	Rami Yacoub, Per Aldeheim
2002	Nick Carter	Now or Never	"I Just Wanna Take You Home"	Rami Yacoub, Per Aldeheim
2003	Celine Dion	One Heart	"Faith"	Rami Yacoub
2003	Celine Dion	One Heart	"In His Touch"	Rami Yacoub
2003	Celine Dion	One Heart	"Love Is All We Need"	Rami Yacoub
2004	Kelly Clarkson	Breakaway	"Since U Been Gone"	Lukasz Gottwald
2004	Kelly Clarkson	Breakaway	"Behind These Hazel Eyes"	Lukasz Gottwald
2005	A-ha	Analogue	"Analogue (All I Want)"	Michael Ilbert
2005	Darin Zanyar	The Anthem	"Stand by Me"	Johan Brorson
2005	Backstreet Boys	Never Gone	"Climbing the Walls"	Lukasz Gottwald
2005	Backstreet Boys	Never Gone	"I Still..."	Rami Yacoub
2005	Backstreet Boys	Never Gone	"Just Want You to Know"	Lukasz Gottwald
2005	Backstreet Boys	Never Gone	"Siberia"	Rami Yacoub
2005	Marion Raven	Here I Am	"Break You"	Dr. Luke
2005	Marion Raven	Here I Am	"End of Me"	Rami Yacoub
2005	Marion Raven	Here I Am	"Gotta Be Kidding"	Rami Yacoub
2005	Marion Raven	Here I Am	"Here I Am"	Rami Yacoub
2005	Marion Raven	Here I Am	"In Spite of Me"	Rami Yacoub
2005	Marion Raven	Here I Am	"Little by Little"	Rami Yacoub
2005	Marion Raven	Here I Am	"Six Feet Under"	Rami Yacoub
2005	The Veronicas	The Secret Life Of...	"4ever"	Dr. Luke
2005	The Veronicas	The Secret Life Of...	"Everything I'm Not"	Dr. Luke
2005	Bo Bice	The Real Thing	"U Make Me Better"	Lukasz Gottwald
2005	Bo Bice	The Real Thing	"Lie ... It's All Right"	Lukasz Gottwald
2006	Pink	I'm Not Dead	"Who Knew"	Dr. Luke
2006	Pink	I'm Not Dead	"U + Ur Hand"	Dr. Luke
2006	Pink	I'm Not Dead	"Cuz I Can"	Dr. Luke
2006	Kelis	Kelis Was Here	"I Don't Think So"	Dr. Luke
2006	Ashley Parker Angel	Soundtrack to Your Life	"Let U Go"	Lukasz Gottwald
2007	Shayne Ward	Breathless	"If That's OK with You"	Savan Kotecha, Arnthor Birgisson
2007	James Blunt	All the Lost Souls	"Carry You Home"	James Blunt
2007	Stanfour	Wild Life	"Do It All"	Per Aldeheim
2007	No Angels	Destiny	"I Had a Feeling"	Arnthor Birgisson, AJ Junior & Kent Larsson
2007	Joanna	Non-album single	"Hips n Lips"	Arnthor Birgisson, Savan Kotecha, Rami Yacoub
2007	Amy Deasismont	Music In Motion	"Stay My Baby"	Savan Kotecha
2007	E-Type	Eurotopia	"True Believer"	E-Type
2007	E-Type	Eurotopia	"Eurofighter"	E-Type
2008	Pink	Funhouse	"So What"	
2008	Pink	Funhouse	"I Don't Believe You"	
2008	Pink	Funhouse	"Please Don't Leave Me"	
2008	Pink	Funhouse	"It's All Your Fault"	Shellback
2008	Pink	Funhouse	"Boring"	Shellback
2008	Britney Spears	Circus	"If U Seek Amy"	Shellback
2009	Britney Spears	The Singles Collection	"3"	Shellback
2009	Leona Lewis	Echo	"Outta My Head"	Shellback
2009	Kelly Clarkson	All I Ever Wanted	"My Life Would Suck Without You"	Lukasz Gottwald
2009	Backstreet Boys	This Is Us	"Bigger"	Shellback
2009	Allison Iraheta	Just like You	"Friday I'll Be Over U"	Shellback
2009	Allison Iraheta	Just like You	"Just like You"	Shellback
2009	Carrie Underwood	Play On	"Quitter"	Shellback, Savan Kotecha
2009	Adam Lambert	For Your Entertainment	"Whataya Want from Me"	
2009	Adam Lambert	For Your Entertainment	"If I Had You"	Shellback, Kristian Lundin
2010	Kesha	Animal	"Kiss n Tell"	Dr. Luke, Shellback
2010	Kesha	Animal	"Hungover"	Dr. Luke, Shellback
2010	Kesha	Animal	"Dinosaur"	Shellback, Benny Blanco
2010	Miranda Cosgrove	Sparks Fly	"Oh Oh"	Tom Meredith
2010	Katy Perry	Teenage Dream	"California Gurls"	Dr. Luke, Benny Blanco
2010	Katy Perry	Teenage Dream	"Teenage Dream"	Dr. Luke, Benny Blanco
2010	Katy Perry	Teenage Dream	"Last Friday Night (T.G.I.F.)"	Dr. Luke
2010	Katy Perry	Teenage Dream	"The One That Got Away"	Dr. Luke
2010	Katy Perry	Teenage Dream	"E.T." (featuring Kanye West)	Dr. Luke, Ammo
2010	Usher	Versus	"DJ Got Us Fallin' in Love"	Shellback
2010	Ray J	Non-album single	"1 Thing Leads to Another"	Dr. Luke, Benny Blanco
2010	Pink	Greatest Hits... So Far!!!	"Raise Your Glass"	Shellback
2010	Pink	Greatest Hits... So Far!!!	"Fuckin' Perfect"	Shellback
2010	T.I.	No Mercy	"That's All She Wrote"	Dr. Luke
2010	Kesha	Cannibal EP	"Blow"	Dr. Luke, Benny Blanco, Kool Kojak
2010	Kesha	Cannibal EP	"Grow a Pear"	Dr. Luke, Benny Blanco
2010	Robyn	Body Talk	"Time Machine"	Shellback
2011	Miranda Cosgrove	High Maintenance	"Dancing Crazy"	Shellback
2011	Those Dancing Days	Daydreams & Nightmares	"Can't Find Entrance"	
2011	Cher Lloyd	Sticks and Stones	"With Ur Love" (featuring Mike Posner)	Shellback
2011	Cher Lloyd	Sticks and Stones	"Beautiful People"	Shellback
2011	Avril Lavigne	Goodbye Lullaby	"What the Hell"	Shellback
2011	Avril Lavigne	Goodbye Lullaby	"Smile"	Shellback
2011	Avril Lavigne	Goodbye Lullaby	"Wish You Were Here"	Shellback
2011	Avril Lavigne	Goodbye Lullaby	"I Love You"	Shellback
2011	Britney Spears	Femme Fatale	"Till the World Ends"	Dr. Luke, Billboard, Emily Wright
2011	Britney Spears	Femme Fatale	"Hold It Against Me"	Dr. Luke, Billboard
2011	Britney Spears	Femme Fatale	"Inside Out"	Dr. Luke, Billboard, Emily Wright
2011	Britney Spears	Femme Fatale	"I Wanna Go"	Shellback
2011	Britney Spears	Femme Fatale	"Seal It with a Kiss"	Dr. Luke, Dream Machine, Emily Wright
2011	Britney Spears	Femme Fatale	"Criminal"	Shellback
2011	Britney Spears	Femme Fatale	"Up n' Down"	Shellback, Oligee
2012	E-Type	Non-album single	"Back 2 Life"	Shellback
2012	Christina Aguilera	Lotus	"Your Body"	Shellback
2012	Christina Aguilera	Lotus	"Let There Be Love"	Shellback
2012	Katy Perry	Teenage Dream: The Complete Confection	"Part of Me "	Dr. Luke, Cirkut
2012	Vicci Martinez	Vicci	"Come Along"	Shellback
2012	Vicci Martinez	Vicci	"Out of Control"	Shellback
2012	Usher	Looking 4 Myself	"Scream"	Shellback
2012	Maroon 5	Overexposed	"One More Night "	Shellback
2012	Maroon 5	Overexposed	"Daylight"	Adam Levine, MdL (Mason Levy)
2012	Taio Cruz	TY.O	"Fast Car"	Klas Åhlund
2012	Taylor Swift	Red	"We Are Never Ever Getting Back Together"	Shellback, Taylor Swift
2012	Taylor Swift	Red	"I Knew You Were Trouble"	Shellback
2012	Taylor Swift	Red	"22"	Shellback
2012	Justin Bieber	Believe	"Beauty and a Beat" (featuring Nicki Minaj)	Zedd
2012	Pink	The Truth About Love	"Sl*t Like You"	Shellback
2012	Kesha	Warrior	"Only Wanna Dance with You"	Dr. Luke, Cirkut, Steven Wolf
2012	Kesha	Warrior	"All That Matters (The Beautiful Life)"	Shellback
2013	Carly Rae Jepsen	Kiss	"Tonight I'm Getting Over You"	Lukas Hilbert
2013	Backstreet Boys	In a World Like This	"In a World Like This"	Kristian Lundin
2013	G.R.L.	The Smurfs 2: Music from and Inspired By	"Vacation"	Dr. Luke
2013	Katy Perry	Prism	"Roar"	Dr. Luke, Cirkut
2013	Katy Perry	Prism	"Legendary Lovers"	Dr. Luke, Cirkut
2013	Katy Perry	Prism	"Birthday"	Dr. Luke, Cirkut
2013	Katy Perry	Prism	"Walking on Air"	Klas Åhlund
2013	Katy Perry	Prism	"Unconditionally"	Dr. Luke, Cirkut
2013	Katy Perry	Prism	"Dark Horse" (featuring Juicy J)	Dr. Luke, Cirkut
2013	Katy Perry	Prism	"This Is How We Do"	Klas Åhlund
2013	Katy Perry	Prism	"International Smile"	Dr. Luke, Cirkut
2013	Katy Perry	Prism	"Ghost"	Dr. Luke, Cirkut
2014	Jennifer Lopez	A.K.A.	"First Love"	Ilya Salmanzadeh
2014	Ariana Grande	My Everything	"Problem" (featuring Iggy Azalea)	Shellback, Ilya Salmanzadeh, Peter Carlson
2014	Ariana Grande	My Everything	"Break Free" (featuring Zedd)	Zedd
2014	Jessie J	Sweet Talker	"Bang Bang" (with Ariana Grande and Nicki Minaj"	Ilya Salmanzadeh, Rickard Göransson
2014	G.R.L.	G.R.L. EP	"Show Me What You Got"	Dr. Luke
2014	G.R.L.	G.R.L. EP	"Rewind"	Dr. Luke
2014	Pitbull	Globalization	"Wild Wild Love" (featuring G.R.L.)	Dr. Luke
2014	Taylor Swift	1989	"Blank Space"	Shellback
2014	Taylor Swift	1989	"Style"	Ali Payami, Shellback
2014	Taylor Swift	1989	"All You Had to Do Was Stay"	Shellback
2014	Taylor Swift	1989	"Shake It Off"	Shellback
2014	Taylor Swift	1989	"Bad Blood"	Shellback
2014	Taylor Swift	1989	"Wildest Dreams"	Shellback
2014	Taylor Swift	1989	"How You Get the Girl"	Shellback
2014	Taylor Swift	1989	"Wonderland"	Shellback
2014	Taylor Swift	1989	"New Romantics"	Shellback
2015	The Weeknd	Beauty Behind the Madness	"Can't Feel My Face"	Ali Payami
2015	The Weeknd	Beauty Behind the Madness	"Shameless"	Ali Payami, Peter Svensson, The Weeknd
2015	The Weeknd	Beauty Behind the Madness	"In the Night"	Ali Payami, The Weeknd
2015	Tori Kelly	Unbreakable Smile	"Nobody Love"	Rickard Göransson
2015	Tori Kelly	Unbreakable Smile	"California Lovers"	Ali Payami
2015	Tori Kelly	Unbreakable Smile	"Expensive"	Lulou
2015	Robin Thicke	Non-album single	"Back Together" (featuring Nicki Minaj)	Ali Payami
2015	Adam Lambert	The Original High	"Ghost Town"	Ali Payami
2015	Adam Lambert	The Original High	"Another Lonely Night"	Ali Payami
2015	Adam Lambert	The Original High	"Lucy"	Ali Payami, Fredrik Samsson
2015	Natalie La Rose	Non-album single	"Around the World" (featuring Fetty Wap)	Ilya Salmanzadeh, Peter Carlson
2015	Demi Lovato	Confident	"Cool for the Summer"	Ali Payami
2015	Demi Lovato	Confident	"Confident"	Ilya Salmanzadeh
2015	Selena Gomez	Revival	"Hands to Myself"	Mattman & Robin
2015	Ariana Grande	Dangerous Woman (Japan exclusive version)	"Focus"	Ilya Salmanzadeh
2015	Ellie Goulding	Delirium	"On My Mind"	Ilya Salmanzadeh
2015	Ellie Goulding	Delirium	"Love Me like You Do"	Ali Payami
2015	Ellie Goulding	Delirium	"Army"	Ali Payami
2015	Ellie Goulding	Delirium	"Lost and Found"	Carl Falk, Kristian Lundin
2015	Adele	25	"Send My Love (To Your New Lover)"	Shellback
2016	Ariana Grande	Dangerous Woman	"Dangerous Woman"	Johan Carlsson
2016	Ariana Grande	Dangerous Woman	"Into You"	Ilya Salmanzadeh
2016	Ariana Grande	Dangerous Woman	"Side to Side" (featuring Nicki Minaj)	Ilya Salmanzadeh
2016	Ariana Grande	Dangerous Woman	"Greedy"	Ilya Salmanzadeh
2016	Ariana Grande	Dangerous Woman	"Sometimes"	Ilya Salmanzadeh
2016	Ariana Grande	Dangerous Woman	"Bad Decisions"	Ilya Salmanzadeh
2016	Ariana Grande	Dangerous Woman	"Touch It"	Ali Payami
2016	Justin Timberlake	Trolls: Original Motion Picture Soundtrack	"Can't Stop the Feeling!"	Shellback, Justin Timberlake
2016	P!nk	Alice Through the Looking Glass	"Just Like Fire"	Shellback, Oscar Holter
2016	Nick Jonas	Last Year Was Complicated	"Under You"	Ali Payami, Shellback
2016	Katy Perry	Non-album single	"Rise"	Ali Payami
2016	The Weeknd	Starboy	Rockin'	Ali Payami, The Weeknd
2016	The Weeknd	Starboy	"Love to Lay"	Ali Payami, The Weeknd
2016	The Weeknd	Starboy	"A Lonely Night"	Ali Payami
2017	Lana Del Rey	Lust for Life	"Lust for Life" (featuring The Weeknd)	Lana Del Rey
2017	Katy Perry	Witness	"Chained to the Rhythm" (featuring Skip Marley)	Ali Payami
2017	Katy Perry	Witness	"Bon Appétit" (featuring Migos)	Shellback, Oscar Holter
2017	Katy Perry	Witness	"Witness"	Ali Payami
2017	Katy Perry	Witness	"Hey Hey Hey"	Ali Payami
2017	Katy Perry	Witness	"Roulette"	Shellback, Ali Payami
2017	Katy Perry	Witness	"Miss you More"	Ali Payami
2017	Katy Perry	Witness	"Save as Draft"	
2017	P!nk	Beautiful Trauma	"Revenge" (featuring Eminem)	Shellback
2017	P!nk	Beautiful Trauma	"Whatever you Want"	Shellback
2017	P!nk	Beautiful Trauma	"Secrets"	Shellback, Oscar Holter
2017	Taylor Swift	Reputation	"...Ready for It?"	Shellback, Ali Payami
2017	Taylor Swift	Reputation	"End Game" (featuring Ed Sheeran and Future)	Shellback
2017	Taylor Swift	Reputation	"I Did Something Bad"	Shellback
2017	Taylor Swift	Reputation	"Don't Blame Me"	Shellback
2017	Taylor Swift	Reputation	"Delicate"	Shellback
2017	Taylor Swift	Reputation	"So It Goes..."	Shellback, Oscar Görres
2017	Taylor Swift	Reputation	"Gorgeous"	Shellback
2017	Taylor Swift	Reputation	"King of My Heart"	Shellback
2017	Taylor Swift	Reputation	"Dancing With Our Hands Tied"	Shellback, Oscar Holter
2018	Ariana Grande	Sweetener	"Raindrops (An Angel Cried)"	Ilya Salmanzadeh
2018	Ariana Grande	Sweetener	"Everytime"	Ilya Salmanzadeh
2018	Ariana Grande	Sweetener	"No Tears Left To Cry"	Ilya Salmanzadeh
2019	Ariana Grande	Thank U, Next	"Bloodline"	Ilya Salmanzadeh
2019	Ariana Grande	Thank U, Next	"Bad Idea"	Ilya Salmanzadeh
2019	Ariana Grande	Thank U, Next	"Ghostin"	Ilya Salmanzadeh
2019	Ariana Grande	Thank U, Next	"Break Up With Your Girlfriend, I'm Bored"	Ilya Salmanzadeh
2019	Ed Sheeran	No.6 Collaborations Project	"I Don't Care " (with Justin Bieber)	Shellback, Fred Again
2019	Ed Sheeran	No.6 Collaborations Project	"Beautiful People" (featuring Khalid)	Ed Sheeran, Shellback, Fred Gibson
2019	Ed Sheeran	No.6 Collaborations Project	"Remember the Name" (featuring Eminem and 50 Cent)	Ed Sheeran, Shellback, Fred Gibson
2019	Pink	Hurts 2B Human	"(Hey Why) Miss You Sometime"	Shellback
2019	Ariana Grande	Charlie's Angels: Original Motion Picture Soundtrack	"Don't Call Me Angel"	Ilya Salmanzadeh
2019	Ariana Grande	Charlie's Angels: Original Motion Picture Soundtrack	"Bad To You"	Ilya Salmanzadeh, Kuk Harrell, Ariana Grande
2019	Ariana Grande	Charlie's Angels: Original Motion Picture Soundtrack	"Nobody"	Ilya Salmanzadeh, Savan Kotecha, Peter Carlson, Ariana Grande
2019	Ariana Grande	Charlie's Angels: Original Motion Picture Soundtrack	"How I Look on You"	Ilya Salmanzadeh, Ariana Grande
2019	Jessie J	& Juliet	"One More Try"	Oscar Holter
2020	Lady Gaga	Chromatica	"Stupid Love"	BloodPop
2020	The Weeknd	After Hours	"Hardest to Love"	Oscar Holter, The Weeknd
2020	The Weeknd	After Hours	"Scared To Live"	Oscar Holter, The Weeknd
2020	The Weeknd	After Hours	"Blinding Lights"	Oscar Holter, The Weeknd
2020	The Weeknd	After Hours	"In Your Eyes"	Oscar Holter, The Weeknd
2020	The Weeknd	After Hours	"Save Your Tears"	Oscar Holter, The Weeknd
2021	Coldplay	Music of the Spheres	"Music of the Spheres"	Oscar Holter, Bill Rahko
2021	Coldplay	Music of the Spheres	"Higher Power"	Oscar Holter, Bill Rahko
2021	Coldplay	Music of the Spheres	"Humankind"	Oscar Holter, Bill Rahko
2021	Coldplay	Music of the Spheres	"Alien Choir"	Bill Rahko
2021	Coldplay	Music of the Spheres	"Let Somebody Go" (with Selena Gomez)	Oscar Holter, Bill Rahko
2021	Coldplay	Music of the Spheres	"Human Heart"	Oscar Holter, Bill Rahko
2021	Coldplay	Music of the Spheres	"People of the Pride"	Oscar Holter, Bill Rahko
2021	Coldplay	Music of the Spheres	"Biutyful"	Oscar Holter, Bill Rahko
2021	Coldplay	Music of the Spheres	"Music of the Spheres ll"	Bill Rahko
2021	Coldplay	Music of the Spheres	"My Universe"	Oscar Holter, Bill Rahko
2021	Coldplay	Music of the Spheres	"Infinity Sign"	Oscar Holter, Bill Rahko
2021	Coldplay	Music of the Spheres	"Coloratura"	Oscar Holter, Bill Rahko
2021	Jonas Brothers	Non-album single	"Who's in Your Head"	Ilya Salmanzadeh
2021	Adele	30	"Can I Get It"	Shellback
2022	The Weeknd	Dawn FM	"Dawn FM"	The Weeknd, OPN, Oscar Holter
2022	The Weeknd	Dawn FM	"Gasoline"	The Weeknd, OPN, Oscar Holter, Matt Cohn
2022	The Weeknd	Dawn FM	"How Do I Make You Love Me?"	The Weeknd, OPN, Swedish House Mafia, Oscar Holter, Matt Cohn
2022	The Weeknd	Dawn FM	"Take My Breath"	Oscar Holter, The Weeknd
2022	The Weeknd	Dawn FM	"Sacrifice"	Swedish House Mafia, Oscar Holter, The Weeknd
2022	The Weeknd	Dawn FM	"A Tale by Quincy"	The Weeknd, OPN, Gitty
2022	The Weeknd	Dawn FM	"Out of Time"	The Weeknd, OPN, Oscar Holter
2022	The Weeknd	Dawn FM	"Best Friends"	The Weeknd, DaHeala, OPN, Oscar Holter, Matt Cohn
2022	The Weeknd	Dawn FM	"Is There Someone Else?"	The Weeknd, OPN, Tommy Brown, Peter Lee Johnson, Oscar Holter
2022	The Weeknd	Dawn FM	"Starry Eyes"	The Weeknd, OPN, Oscar Holter
2022	The Weeknd	Dawn FM	"Don't Break My Heart"	The Weeknd, OPN, Oscar Holter, Matt Cohn
2022	The Weeknd	Dawn FM	"I Heard You're Married" (featuring Lil Wayne)	The Weeknd, Calvin Harris, OPN, Oscar Holter, Matt Cohn
2022	The Weeknd	Dawn FM	"Less than Zero"	The Weeknd, OPN, Oscar Holter
2022	The Weeknd	Dawn FM	"Phantom Regret by Jim"	The Weeknd, OPN, Oscar Holter, Matt Cohn
2022	Lizzo	Special	"Grrrls"	Benny Blanco, Ilya Salmanzadeh, Blake Slatkin, Pop Wansel
2022	Lizzo	Special	"2 Be Loved (Am I Ready)"	Ilya Salmanzadeh
2022	Lizzo	Special	"Special"	Pop Wansel, Ian Kirkpatrick, Daoud
2022	Halsey	Non-album single	"So Good"	Tobias Karlsson
2022	Max Martin	Promotional Track for StemDrop	"Red Lights"	Ali Payami
2022	P!nk	Trustfall	"Never Gonna Not Dance Again"	Shellback
2022	Kim Petras	Non-album single	"If Jesus Was a Rockstar"	Omer Fedi, Ilya Salmanzadeh
2023	Måneskin	Rush!	"Supermodel"	Rami Yacoub, Sly
2023	Måneskin	Rush!	"Read Your Diary"	Rami Yacoub, Sly
2023	Måneskin	Rush!	"If Not for You"	Rami Yacoub, Sly
2023	Ed Sheeran	-	"Eyes Closed"	Aaron Dessner, Fred again.., Shellback
2023	Lewis Capaldi	Broken by Desire to Be Heavenly Sent	"Leave Me Slowly"	Fat Max Gsus, Mutt Lange
2023	Ed Sheeran	Non-album single	"A Beautiful Game"	OZGO
2023	Post Malone	Austin	"Sign Me Up"	Louis Bell, Post Malone, Rami Yacoub
2023	Post Malone	Austin	"Enough Is Enough"	Louis Bell, Post Malone, Rami Yacoub
2024	Conan Gray	Found Heaven	"Never Ending Song"	Ilya Salmanzadeh
2024	Conan Gray	Found Heaven	"Killing Me"	Oscar Holter
2024	Conan Gray	Found Heaven	"Lonely Dancers"	Oscar Holter, Ilya Salmanzadeh
2024	Conan Gray	Found Heaven	"Fainted Love"	Oscar Holter
2024	Conan Gray	Found Heaven	"The Final Fight"	Oscar Holter, Ilya Salmanzadeh
2024	Conan Gray	Found Heaven	"Miss You"	Oscar Holter
2024	Conan Gray	Found Heaven	"Boys and Girls"	Oscar Holter
2024	Ariana Grande	Eternal Sunshine	"Bye"	Ariana Grande, Ilya Salmanzadeh
2024	Ariana Grande	Eternal Sunshine	"Don't Wanna Break Up Again"	Ariana Grande, Ilya Salmanzadeh
2024	Ariana Grande	Eternal Sunshine	"Saturn Returns Interlude"	Ariana Grande, Ilya Salmanzadeh, Will Loftis
2024	Ariana Grande	Eternal Sunshine	"Eternal Sunshine"	Davidior, Ariana Grande, Ilya Salmanzadeh, Shintaro Yasuda
2024	Ariana Grande	Eternal Sunshine	"Supernatural"	Ariana Grande, OzGo
2024	Ariana Grande	Eternal Sunshine	"True Story"	Ariana Grande, Ilya Salmanzadeh
2024	Ariana Grande	Eternal Sunshine	"The Boy Is Mine"	Davidior, Ariana Grande, Ilya Salmanzadeh, Shintaro Yasuda
2024	Ariana Grande	Eternal Sunshine	"Yes, And?"	Ariana Grande, Ilya Salmanzadeh
2024	Ariana Grande	Eternal Sunshine	"We Can't Be Friends (Wait for Your Love)"	Ariana Grande, Ilya Salmanzadeh
2024	Ariana Grande	Eternal Sunshine	"Imperfect for You"	Ariana Grande, Ilya Salmanzadeh, Peter Kahm
2024	Ariana Grande	Eternal Sunshine	"Ordinary Things"	Ariana Grande, Luka Kloser, Nick Lee
2024	Coldplay	Moon Music	"feelslikeimfallinginlove"	Oscar Holter, Bill Rahko, Daniel Green, Michael Ilbert
2024	Coldplay	Moon Music	"We Pray"	Ilya Salmanzadeh, Bill Rahko, Daniel Green, Michael Ilbert
2024	Coldplay	Moon Music	"Jupiter"	Bill Rahko, Daniel Green, Michael Ilbert
2024	Coldplay	Moon Music	"Moon Music"	Bill Rahko, Daniel Green, Michael Ilbert
2024	Coldplay	Moon Music	"Good Feelings"	Bill Rahko, Daniel Green, Michael Ilbert
2024	Coldplay	Moon Music	"Alien Hits / Alien Radio"	Bill Rahko, Daniel Green, Michael Ilbert
2024	Coldplay	Moon Music	"iAAM"	Bill Rahko, Daniel Green, Michael Ilbert
2024	Coldplay	Moon Music	"Aeterna"	Bill Rahko, Daniel Green, Michael Ilbert
2024	Coldplay	Moon Music	"All My Love"	Bill Rahko, Daniel Green, Michael Ilbert
2024	Coldplay	Moon Music	"One World"	Bill Rahko, Daniel Green, Michael Ilbert
2024	Coldplay	Moon Music	"Man in the Moon"	Oscar Holter, Bill Rahko, Daniel Green, Michael Ilbert
2024	Childish Gambino	Bando Stone & the New World	"Lithonia"	Childish Gambino, Ludwig Göransson, Michael Uzowuru
2024	Childish Gambino	Bando Stone & the New World	"A Place Where Love Goes"	Childish Gambino, DJ Dahi, Ludwig Göransson, Oscar Holter
2024	Lisa	Alter Ego	"New Woman" (featuring Rosalía)	Ilya Salmanzadeh
2024	The Weeknd	Non-album single	"Dancing in the Flames"	Oscar Holter, The Weeknd
2025	The Weeknd	Hurry Up Tomorrow	"Open Hearts"	Oscar Holter, The Weeknd
2025	The Weeknd	Hurry Up Tomorrow	"Give Me Mercy"	Oscar Holter, Ilya Salmanzadeh, The Weeknd
2025	The Weeknd	Hurry Up Tomorrow	"Drive"	Oneohtrix Point Never, Oscar Holter, The Weeknd, Matt Cohn, Nathan Salon
2025	The Weeknd	Hurry Up Tomorrow (First Pressing)	"Runaway"	Oscar Holter, The Weeknd
2025	The Weeknd	Hurry Up Tomorrow (First Pressing)	"Society"	Oscar Holter, The Weeknd
2025	Between Friends	Wow!	"American Bitch"	Brandon Hudson
2025	Ariana Grande	Eternal Sunshine Deluxe: Brighter Days Ahead	"Twilight Zone"	Ariana Grande, Ilya Salmanzadeh
2025	Ariana Grande	Eternal Sunshine Deluxe: Brighter Days Ahead	"Warm"	Ariana Grande, Oscar Görres
2025	Ariana Grande	Eternal Sunshine Deluxe: Brighter Days Ahead	"Dandelion"	Ariana Grande, Ilya Salmanzadeh
2025	Ariana Grande	Eternal Sunshine Deluxe: Brighter Days Ahead	"Past Life"	Ariana Grande, Ilya Salmanzadeh
2025	Ariana Grande	Eternal Sunshine Deluxe: Brighter Days Ahead	"Hampstead"	Ariana Grande, Ilya Salmanzadeh
2025	Taylor Swift	The Life of a Showgirl		
2025	Taylor Swift	The Life of a Showgirl	"The Fate of Ophelia"	Shellback, Taylor Swift
2025	Taylor Swift	The Life of a Showgirl	"Elizabeth Taylor"	Shellback, Taylor Swift
2025	Taylor Swift	The Life of a Showgirl	"Opalite"	Shellback, Taylor Swift
2025	Taylor Swift	The Life of a Showgirl	"Father Figure"	Shellback, Taylor Swift
2025	Taylor Swift	The Life of a Showgirl	"Eldest Daughter"	Shellback, Taylor Swift
2025	Taylor Swift	The Life of a Showgirl	"Ruin the Friendship"	Shellback, Taylor Swift
2025	Taylor Swift	The Life of a Showgirl	"Actually Romantic"	Shellback, Taylor Swift
2025	Taylor Swift	The Life of a Showgirl	"Wi$h Li$t"	Shellback, Taylor Swift
2025	Taylor Swift	The Life of a Showgirl	"Wood"	Shellback, Taylor Swift
2025	Taylor Swift	The Life of a Showgirl	"CANCELLED!"	Shellback, Taylor Swift
2025	Taylor Swift	The Life of a Showgirl	"Honey"	Shellback, Taylor Swift
2025	Taylor Swift	The Life of a Showgirl	"The Life of a Showgirl" (featuring Sabrina Carpenter)	Shellback, Taylor Swift
2025	Izraella Jolie	TBA	"Not Ok"	
2025	Sophia Somajo	Clown	"Tarantino"	Martin Stilling
2026	Ariana Grande	Petal		
2026	Ariana Grande	Petal	"Hate That I Made You Love Me"	Ariana Grande, Ilya Salmanzadeh
2026	Ariana Grande	Petal	"Petal"	Ariana Grande, Ilya Salmanzadeh
2026	Ariana Grande	Petal	"Stay"	Ariana Grande, Ilya Salmanzadeh

== Top ten singles ==
The following singles peaked inside the top ten on the Billboard Hot 100 and Hot 100 Airplay.

Number-one singles (Peak date)

- "...Baby One More Time" (1999-01-30)
- "It's Gonna Be Me" (2000-07-29)
- "I Kissed a Girl" (2008-07-05)
- "So What" (2008-09-27)
- "My Life Would Suck Without You" (2009-02-07)
- "3" (2009-10-24)
- "California Gurls" (2010-06-19)
- "Teenage Dream" (2010-09-18)
- "Raise Your Glass" (2010-12-11)
- "Hold It Against Me" (2011-01-29)
- "E.T." (2011-04-09)
- "Last Friday Night (T.G.I.F.)" (2011-08-27)
- "Part of Me" (2012-03-03)
- "We Are Never Ever Getting Back Together" (2012-09-01)
- "One More Night" (2012-09-29)
- "Roar" (2013-09-14)
- "Dark Horse" (2014-02-08)
- "Shake It Off" (2014-09-06)
- "Blank Space" (2014-11-29)
- "Bad Blood" (2015-06-06)
- "Can't Feel My Face" (2015-08-22)
- "Can't Stop the Feeling!" (2016-05-28)
- "Blinding Lights" (2020-04-04)
- "Save Your Tears" (2021-05-08)
- "My Universe" (2021-10-09)
- "Yes, And?" (2024-01-27)
- "We Can't Be Friends (Wait for Your Love)" (2024-03-23)
- "The Fate of Ophelia" (2025-10-18)
- "Opalite" (2026-02-28)
- "Hate That I Made You Love Me"

(2026-06-13)

Other Top 10 hits (Peak date) Peak

- "Do You Know (What It Takes)" (1997-08-02) #7
- "Quit Playing Games (with My Heart)" (1997-09-06) #2
- "Show Me Love" (1997-11-29) #7
- "Everybody (Backstreet's Back)" (1998-05-09) #4
- "I Want It That Way" (1999-06-26) #6
- "(You Drive Me) Crazy" (1999-11-13) #10
- "That's the Way It Is" (2000-03-04) #6
- "Show Me the Meaning of Being Lonely" (2000-03-18) #6
- "Oops!... I Did It Again" (2000-06-10) #9
- "Shape of My Heart" (2000-12-02) #9
- "Since U Been Gone" (2005-04-09) #2
- "Behind These Hazel Eyes" (2005-06-11) #6
- "U + Ur Hand" (2007-05-05) #9
- "Who Knew" (2007-09-29) #9
- "Hot n Cold" (2008-11-22) #3
- "Whataya Want from Me" (2010-05-01) #10
- "Dynamite" (2010-08-21) #2
- "DJ Got Us Fallin' in Love" (2010-10-09) #4
- "Fuckin' Perfect" (2011-02-12) #2
- "Blow" (2011-03-19) #7
- "Loser Like Me" (2011-04-02) #6
- "Till the World Ends" (2011-05-14) #3
- "I Wanna Go" (2011-08-20) #7
- "The One That Got Away" (2012-01-07) #3
- "Domino" (2012-02-18) #6
- "Scream" (2012-08-04) #9
- "Wide Awake" (2012-08-11) #2
- "Beauty and a Beat" (2013-01-05) #5
- "I Knew You Were Trouble" (2013-01-12) #2
- "Daylight" (2013-02-23) #7
- "Problem" (2014-06-07) #2
- "Break Free" (2014-08-30 #4
- "Bang Bang" (2014-10-04) #3
- "Love Me Harder" (2014-11-22) #7
- "Love Me Like You Do" (2015-03-07) #3
- "Style" (2015-03-21) #6
- "Wildest Dreams" (2015-11-07) #5
- "Focus" (2015-11-21) #7
- "Hands to Myself" (2016-02-13) #7
- "Dangerous Woman" (2016-06-11) #8
- "Just Like Fire" (2016-06-18) #10
- "Send My Love (To Your New Lover)" (2016-09-24) #8
- "Side to Side" (2016-12-03) #4
- "Chained to the Rhythm" (2017-03-04) #4
- "...Ready for It?" (2017-09-23) #4
- "No Tears Left to Cry" (2018-05-05) #3
- "God Is A Woman" (2018-09-01) #8
- "Break Up with Your Girlfriend, I'm Bored" (2019-02-23) #2
- "I Don't Care" (2019-05-25) #2
- "Stupid Love" (2020-03-14) #5
- "Take My Breath" (2021-08-21) #6
- "Bad Blood (Taylor's Version)" (2023-11-11) #7
- "Style (Taylor's Version)" (2023-11-11) #9
- "Elizabeth Taylor" (2025-10-18) #3
- "Father Figure" (2025-10-18) #4
- "Wood" (2025-10-18) #5
- "Wish List" (2025-10-18) #6
- "Actually Romantic" (2025-10-18) #7
- "The Life of a Showgirl" (2025-10-18) #8
- "Eldest Daughter" (2025-10-18) #9
- "Cancelled!" (2025-10-18) #10
