= Joy M'Batha =

Swedish rapper

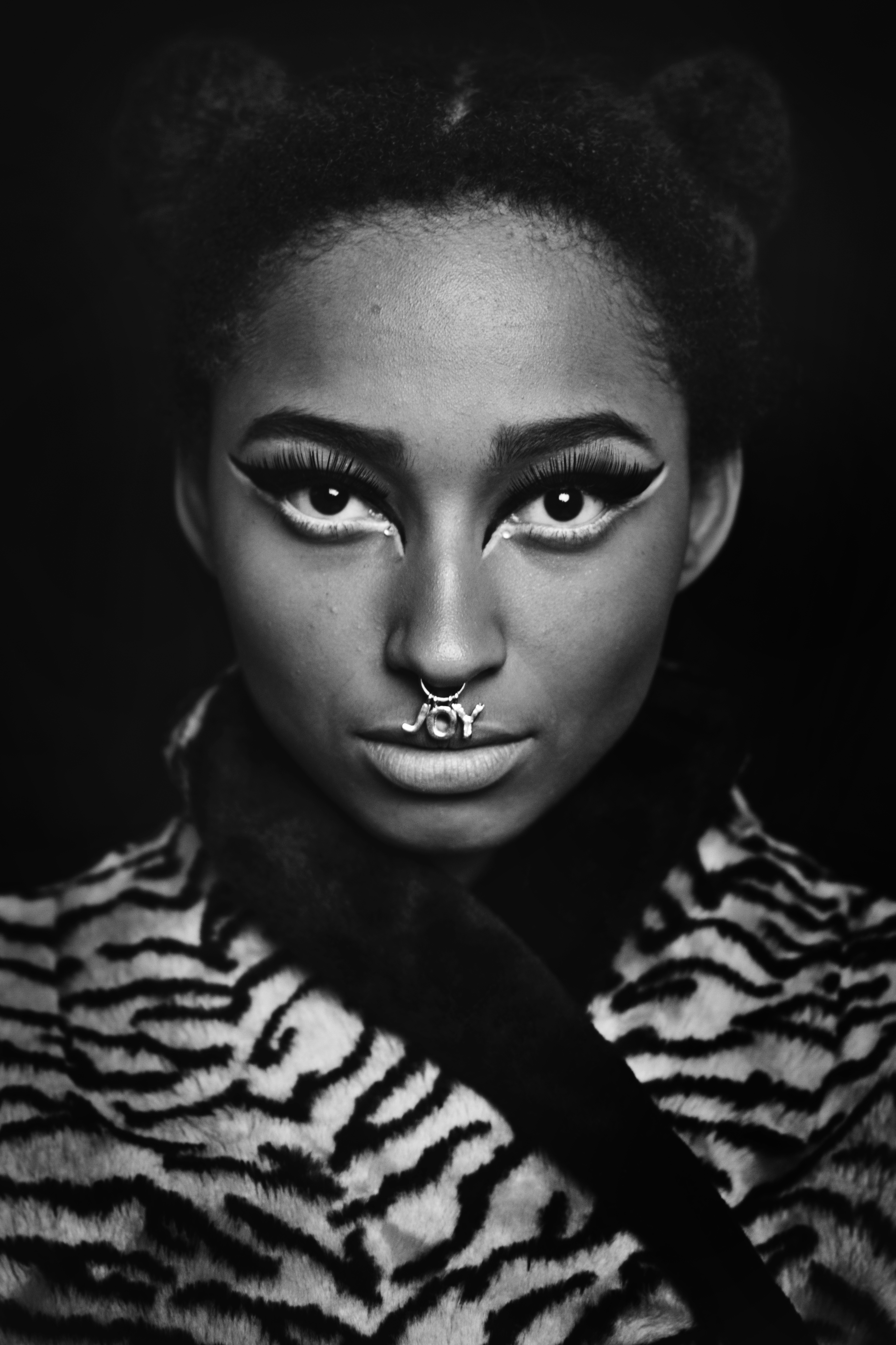
- Joy M'Batha (2015)

Background information
- Born: Joy Nirak Fikile M'Batha; 13 November 1994 (age 31); Malmö, Sweden
- Genres: Hip hop
- Occupations: Rapper, singer
- Years active: 2014–present

Joy Nirak Fikile M'Batha (born 13 November 1994), best known as Joy, is a Swedish rapper.

== Biography ==
Her breakthrough came in 2015 when she collaborated with Lorentz on the music single Där dit vinden kommer as well as Kattliv. M'Batha in 2015 collaborated with Linda Pira on her single Knäpper Mina Fingrar when she did a remix of the song. She also worked with Timbuktu on his remixalbum För Livet Till Döden – Remixerna on the song Spring .

Along with Frej Larsson she did the song "Mitt team" which was the official Swedish team song for the 2016 Euro. M'Batha has toured around the Nordic region during the summer of 2015 along with the music group Maskinen. Maskinen and M'Batha met in 2014 during the first season of the web-series "Nästa nivå" were new rap artists gets paired up with established acts and producers. They performed at Bråvalla festival and the Malmöfestivalen.

In 2016, she was nominated for Newcomer of the year at the music award show P3 Guld for Sveriges Radio.

In 2018, she had her first art exhibition at Snickarbacken 7 in Stockholm and put out her first English EP "Thirsty".

In 2019, M'Batha released the single "Spegel Tillbaka" together with Panda da Panda and performed at festivals such as Westpride in Gothenburg and Summerbreak in Stockholm with Zeventine.

== Singles ==
Title	Year	Peak chart positions	Album
Title	Year	SWE	Album
"KRLKN"	2017		Non-album single
