= Hardest to Love =

2020 song by the Weeknd

Song by the Weeknd

from the album After Hours
- Released: March 20, 2020
- Studio: MXM (Los Angeles, California); House Mouse Studios, MXM (Stockholm, Sweden)
- Genre: Drum and bass; liquid funk
- Length: 3:31
- Label: XO; Republic
- Songwriters: Abel Tesfaye; Max Martin; Oscar Holter
- Producers: Max Martin; Oscar Holter; The Weeknd

"Hardest to Love" is a song by the Canadian singer-songwriter the Weeknd from his fourth studio album After Hours (2020). The Weeknd wrote and produced the song alongside Max Martin and Oscar Holter.

== Background and composition ==
While previewing the album to Jem Aswad of Variety, the Weeknd shared some information about Hardest to Love's development, stating:

"This one I did originally with [co-writer/co-producer] Oscar [Holter], and then Max [Martin] finished it with me. I wrote this song very fast and it was the last song on the record that I finished. When I made this song I was nervous because I felt like I went overboard with the ambition — I'm ambitious, but I thought maybe this is too much. It wasn't until 'Blinding Lights' [became one of the biggest hits of Weeknd's career] that I knew, a) I could finish this album and b) I could put this song on it. And sometimes it just comes down to the melody. This was the fastest melody that I ever made — I went into a room for 20 minutes and wrote the entire song, and then Max produced it".

The song was first previewed in a teaser video posted to the Weeknd's Twitter account on March 19, 2020.

"Hardest to Love" features the Weeknd reminiscing on his past behaviors in a relationship, blaming himself for its demise. The song refers to some softer points in the U.K. hardcore continuum dating back to the late '90s via drum-'n'-bass while modernizing it with finesse.

== Critical reception ==
"Hardest to Love" received universal acclaim. "On the standout 'Hardest to Love,' Tesfaye delivers one of the most affecting vocal performances of his career over a glitchy pop soundscape. The song's catchiness belies its melancholy, a sophisticated combination that's a testament to Tesfaye's depiction of a relationship that results in a confusing morass of emotions that we seldom process them in a linear fashion: anger, sadness, gratitude, elation, loneliness. Tesfaye navigates these conflicting emotions in a way that captures the experience of being lost in that swirl," noted Slant Magazine columnist Seth Wilson. Yahoo Entertainment writer Larry Fitzmaurice exclaimed, "The Weeknd delivers After Hours' most shocking deviation from that gloom and doom aesthetic with the sky-climbing 'Hardest to Love,' a featherweight slice of drum 'n' bass that resembles a lost track from Björk's classic Homogenic". Rolling Stone journalist praised the song, "On 'Hardest to Love,' a fleet, pretty Max Martin co-write with a Nineties-evoking drum 'n' bass feel, he's the cold-hearted ex stamping out love's final embers, adding a quintessentially Weeknd-ish kicker: "It's hard to let me go," at once self-cancelling and self-absorbed".

Vice editor Ashwin Rodrigues said, "On 'Hardest to Love,' The Weeknd admits his shortcomings as a romantic partner on top of electric, water droplet synths and a constant, low vibrating drum n bass beat. The track features a hard-to-shake chorus and production that would really put the sound system of a brand new, electric German SUV to the test". Tom Breihan of Stereogum analyzed, " 'Hardest To Love' adapts glimmering Max Martin melodies to fit the rushing pulse of car-commercial drum-'n'-bass. The record seamlessly combines elite-aesthete sound clouds with big-money pop music. His voice is magnificent. Tesfaye's only gaining greater control of his instrument; he floats airily over these fantastically rich soundscapes that he's commissioned". 'Hardest to Love' is a taut and disciplined assemblage ready for mass consumption. The piece is built on a stuttering drum beat and major-key melody and is positively uplifting," asserted The Wall Street Journal writer Mark Richardson.

"'Hardest to Love' pays homage to liquid drum 'N' bass, building a sense of irony as the upbeat instrumental belies a heartfelt confession of wrong-doing. An angelic choir can be heard, creating a sense of hope, greatly showcasing how effective the production throughout this album is," observed Clash Magazine reviewer Ramy Abou-Setta. GQ Magazine writer Max Cea added, "It's dark and moody, and comes from the perspective of a lonely narrator capturing the way a lot of people are feeling as they pace their living rooms and feverishly refresh the news".

== Commercial performance ==
Following the release of its parent album, "Hardest to Love" debuted at number 25 on the US Billboard Hot 100 dated April 4, 2020. On the Rolling Stone Top 100 Songs chart, the song reached its peak of number seven. In the singer's native country of Canada, "Hardest to Love" reached number 36 on the Canadian Hot 100.

== Personnel ==
Credits adapted from Genius.

- The Weeknd – songwriting, vocals, production, programming, keyboards, bass, guitar, drums
- Max Martin – songwriting, production, programming, keyboards, bass, guitar, drums
- Oscar Holter – songwriting, production, programming, keyboards, bass, guitar, drums
- Shin Kamiyama – engineering
- Cory Bice – engineering assistant
- Jeremy Lertola – engineering assistant
- Sean Klein – engineering assistant
- Serban Ghenea – mixing
- John Hanes – engineering for mixing
- Dave Kutch – mastering
- Kevin Peterson – mastering

== Charts ==
Chart (2020)	Peak position
Canada Hot 100 (Billboard)	36
Czech Republic Singles Digital (ČNS IFPI)	40
Denmark (Tracklisten)	38
Estonia (Eesti Tipp-40)	21
France (SNEP)	52
Greece (IFPI)	37
Iceland (Tónlistinn)	22
Italy (FIMI)	49
Lithuania (AGATA)	28
New Zealand Hot Singles (RMNZ)	2
Slovakia Singles Digital (ČNS IFPI)	15
Sweden (Sverigetopplistan)	39
UK Audio Streaming (Official Charts)	34
US Billboard Hot 100	25
US Rolling Stone Top 100	6

== Certifications ==
Region	Certification	Certified units/sales
Australia (ARIA)	Gold	35,000^{‡}
Brazil (Pro-Música Brasil)	Gold	20,000^{‡}
Canada (Music Canada)	Platinum	80,000^{‡}
^{‡} Sales+streaming figures based on certification alone.

== Release history ==
Region	Date	Format	Label(s)	Ref.
Various	March 20, 2020	Digital download; streaming	XO; Republic	
