= List of Billboard Hot 100 top-ten singles in 2000 =

This is a list of singles that charted in the top ten of the Billboard Hot 100 during 2000.

Destiny's Child, 'N Sync, and Christina Aguilera each had three top-ten hits in 2000, tying them for the most top-ten hits during the year.

== Top-ten singles ==
Key

- † – indicates Best performing song of the year
- (#) – 2000 year-end top 10 single position and rank

List of Billboard Hot 100 top ten singles which peaked in 2000
| Top ten entry date | Single | Artist(s) | Peak | Peak date | Weeks in top ten |
Singles from 1999
| October 9 | "My Love Is Your Love" | Whitney Houston | 4 | January 1 | 17 |
| December 4 | "I Knew I Loved You" (#7) | Savage Garden | 1 | January 29 | 17 |
| December 18 | "Hot Boyz" | Missy Elliott featuring Lil' Mo, Nas, Eve and Q-Tip | 5 | January 8 | 10 |
| December 25 | "Bring It All to Me" | Blaque | 5 | January 22 | 9 |
Singles from 2000
| January 8 | "Auld Lang Syne" | Kenny G | 7 | January 8 | 2 |
| January 15 | "What a Girl Wants" | Christina Aguilera | 1 | January 15 | 7 |
| January 22 | "Blue (Da Ba Dee)" | Eiffel 65 | 6 | January 29 | 4 |
| January 29 | "That's the Way It Is" | Céline Dion | 6 | March 4 | 9 |
| February 5 | "Get It On Tonite" | Montell Jordan | 4 | February 12 | 12 |
| February 12 | "Thank God I Found You" | Mariah Carey featuring Joe and 98 Degrees | 1 | February 19 | 4 |
| February 12 | "All the Small Things" | Blink-182 | 6 | February 19 | 5 |
| February 19 | "Maria Maria" (#3) | Santana featuring The Product G&B | 1 | April 8 | 18 |
| February 19 | "Show Me the Meaning of Being Lonely" | Backstreet Boys | 6 | March 18 | 8 |
| February 26 | "Amazed" (#8) | Lonestar | 1 | March 4 | 12 |
| February 26 | "Breathe" † (#1) | Faith Hill | 2 | April 22 | 19 |
| March 4 | "Bye Bye Bye" | 'N Sync | 4 | April 15 | 12 |
| March 18 | "Say My Name" (#6) | Destiny's Child | 1 | March 18 | 11 |
| April 1 | "Thong Song" | Sisqó | 3 | May 20 | 13 |
| April 8 | "There You Go" | Pink | 7 | April 8 | 7 |
| April 15 | "I Try" | Macy Gray | 5 | May 20 | 9 |
| April 22 | "It Feels So Good" | Sonique | 8 | April 22 | 3 |
| April 22 | "Everything You Want" (#5) | Vertical Horizon | 1 | July 15 | 19 |
| April 29 | "He Wasn't Man Enough" (#10) | Toni Braxton | 2 | May 6 | 7 |
| May 13 | "Be with You" | Enrique Iglesias | 1 | June 24 | 10 |
| May 20 | "Try Again" | Aaliyah | 1 | June 17 | 15 |
| May 27 | "You Sang to Me" | Marc Anthony | 2 | June 3 | 6 |
| June 3 | "I Wanna Know" (#4) | Joe | 4 | July 1 | 16 |
| June 10 | "The Real Slim Shady" | Eminem | 4 | June 24 | 7 |
| June 10 | "Oops!... I Did It Again" | Britney Spears | 9 | June 10 | 3 |
| June 24 | "It's Gonna Be Me" | 'N Sync | 1 | July 29 | 11 |
| July 1 | "I Turn to You" | Christina Aguilera | 3 | July 1 | 4 |
| July 8 | "Bent" (#9) | Matchbox Twenty | 1 | July 22 | 14 |
| July 8 | "Higher" | Creed | 7 | July 22 | 6 |
| July 22 | "Absolutely (Story of a Girl)" | Nine Days | 6 | July 22 | 7 |
| July 29 | "Jumpin', Jumpin'" | Destiny's Child | 3 | August 19 | 16 |
| August 5 | "Incomplete" | Sisqó | 1 | August 12 | 13 |
| August 5 | "Doesn't Really Matter" | Janet Jackson | 1 | August 26 | 12 |
| August 19 | "No More" | Ruff Endz | 5 | September 2 | 6 |
| September 2 | "Kryptonite" | 3 Doors Down | 3 | November 11 | 18 |
| September 2 | "Wifey" | Next | 7 | September 9 | 3 |
| September 9 | "Music" | Madonna | 1 | September 16 | 12 |
| September 9 | "Country Grammar (Hot Shit)" | Nelly | 7 | September 16 | 5 |
| September 23 | "Come On Over Baby (All I Want Is You)" | Christina Aguilera | 1 | October 14 | 8 |
| September 30 | "Give Me Just One Night (Una Noche)" | 98 Degrees | 2 | September 30 | 5 |
| September 30 | "With Arms Wide Open" | Creed | 1 | November 11 | 18 |
| October 7 | "Bag Lady" | Erykah Badu | 6 | October 7 | 4 |
| October 14 | "Most Girls" | Pink | 4 | November 25 | 9 |
| October 28 | "Gotta Tell You" | Samantha Mumba | 4 | December 9 | 9 |
| November 4 | "This I Promise You" | 'N Sync | 5 | December 2 | 9 |
| November 4 | "Independent Women Part I" | Destiny's Child | 1 | November 18 | 17 |
| November 4 | "Case of the Ex" | Mýa | 2 | December 2 | 13 |
| November 25 | "Shape of My Heart" | Backstreet Boys | 9 | December 2 | 3 |
| December 16 | "He Loves U Not" | Dream | 2 | December 30 | 11 |

=== 1999 peaks ===
List of Billboard Hot 100 top ten singles in 2000 which peaked in 1999
| Top ten entry date | Single | Artist(s) | Peak | Peak date | Weeks in top ten |
|---|---|---|---|---|---|
| September 4 | "Smooth" (#2) | Santana featuring Rob Thomas | 1 | October 23 | 30 |
| October 2 | "I Need to Know" | Marc Anthony | 3 | November 27 | 19 |
| November 6 | "Back At One" | Brian McKnight | 2 | November 20 | 15 |
| November 20 | "I Wanna Love You Forever" | Jessica Simpson | 3 | December 11 | 10 |
| December 4 | "U Know What's Up" | Donell Jones featuring Lisa Lopes | 7 | December 11 | 6 |
| December 11 | "Girl On TV" | LFO | 10 | December 11 | 2 |

=== 2001 peaks ===
List of Billboard Hot 100 top ten singles in 2000 which peaked in 2001
| Top ten entry date | Single | Artist(s) | Peak | Peak date | Weeks in top ten |
|---|---|---|---|---|---|
| November 18 | "The Way You Love Me" | Faith Hill | 6 | January 13 | 13 |
| December 2 | "It Wasn't Me" | Shaggy featuring Rikrok | 1 | February 3 | 16 |
| December 16 | "Ms. Jackson" | Outkast | 1 | February 17 | 12 |
| December 30 | "If You're Gone" | Matchbox Twenty | 5 | January 27 | 10 |
| December 30 | "Dance with Me" | Debelah Morgan | 8 | January 6 | 3 |

== Artists with most top-ten songs ==
List of artists by total songs peaking in the top-ten
| Artist | Numbers of songs |
|---|---|
| Destiny's Child | 3 |
| 'N Sync | 3 |
| Christina Aguilera | 3 |
| Joe | 2 |
| Sisqó | 2 |
| 98 Degrees | 2 |
| Creed | 2 |
| Pink | 2 |
| Backstreet Boys | 2 |
| Santana | 2 |
| Faith Hill | 2 |
| Matchbox Twenty | 2 |

== See also ==
- 2000 in music
- List of Billboard Hot 100 number ones of 2000
- Billboard Year-End Hot 100 singles of 2000
