= Prime STH =

Swedish alternative rock band

- Also known as: Prime
- Origin: Stockholm, Sweden
- Genres: heavy metal; alternative rock; post-grunge; pop
- Years active: 1994–c. 2005
- Labels: Giant; Warner Bros.; Reprise; MVG; Nuclear Blast; Wood
- Past members: Noa Modén; Martin Påhlsson; Jesper Eksjoo; Kasper Lindgren

Prime, known in North America as Prime STH (S.T.H. for Stockholm), were a Swedish alternative rock quartet from Stockholm, Sweden. The band, which included vocalist Noa Modén, guitarist Martin Påhlsson, bassist Jesper Eksjoo, and drummer Kasper Lindgren, was formed while the members were teenagers. They have released two studio albums: Underneath the Surface (2001) and Beautiful Awakening (2004). Their most popular song "I'm Stupid (Don't Worry 'Bout Me)", a single from Underneath the Surface, was written by Max Martin and reached the top 30 of the Billboard Alternative Songs and Mainstream Rock charts.

== Career ==
=== 2001: Underneath the Surface ===
On 26 June 2001, the band released their debut album, Underneath the Surface, on Giant/Warner Bros. In the United States, it was released the week of 9 July 2001, by Reprise Records. The album received generally mixed reviews from music critics, holding a score of 60 out of 100 on review aggregator Album of the Year. A review by Devon Powers of PopMatters praised the album's range and called it "not your little sister’s alternative rock band". Slant critic Aaron Scott awarded the album two stars out of five and criticized the way that the album "straddles the line between pop and hard rock", although praising the album's catchiness.

The album also spawned the single "I'm Stupid (Don't Worry 'Bout Me)", which was written by Max Martin. On the Billboard Mainstream Rock Tracks chart dated 2 June 2001, the single debuted at number 40, while it debuted at number 38 on the Alternative Songs chart the following week. On the chart dated 21 July 2001, the track attained a peak of number 28 on Mainstream Rock, holding the spot for three weeks, while the following week, 28 July 2001, it would peak at 27 on Modern Rock.

In March 2003, Prime STH played at New York City's historic CBGB club for a two-day showcase of Swedish artists titled "The Swedish Invasion Continues ... 2003".

=== 2004: Beautiful Awakening ===
The band released their second studio album, Beautiful Awakening, in March 2004 in Scandinavia via Swedish label MVG/Push Music. It was released in the rest of Europe on 4 April via German label Nuclear Blast, while it was released in Japan on 5 September via Wood Records. As of October 2004, Billboard reported that they were looking for distribution for the album in the United States.

== Members ==
Adapted from AllMusic and PopMatters.

- Noa Modén — vocalist, guitarist
- Martin Påhlsson — guitarist
- Jesper Eksjoo (JSPR) — bassist
- Kasper Lindgren (Kaz) — drummer

== Discography ==
=== Albums ===
- Underneath the Surface, (26 June 2001 release on Reprise Records/Warner Bros. Records)
- Beautiful Awakening, (5 April 2004 release on Nuclear Blast)

=== Singles ===
- 2001, "I'm Stupid (Don't Worry 'Bout Me)", U.S. Billboard Alternative Songs No. 28; U.S. Billboard Mainstream Rock Tracks No. 28
