= Wood (song) =

2025 song by Taylor Swift

Song by Taylor Swift

from the album The Life of a Showgirl
- Released: October 3, 2025
- Studio: MXM; Shellback (Stockholm)
- Genre: Disco; dance; pop soul; synth-funk; synth-pop
- Length: 2:30
- Label: Republic
- Songwriters: Taylor Swift; Max Martin; Shellback
- Producers: Taylor Swift; Max Martin; Shellback

Lyric video
- "Wood" on YouTube

"Wood" is a song by the American singer-songwriter Taylor Swift from her twelfth studio album, The Life of a Showgirl (2025). She wrote and produced it with Max Martin and Shellback. A Motown-inspired track incorporating disco, dance, pop soul, synth-funk, and synth-pop, "Wood" features an upbeat production driven by drums, bass, electric guitars, and clavinet, with subdued strings and horns. Its retro sound drew comparisons to the music of the Jackson 5, particularly their 1969 song "I Want You Back". Described by journalists as Swift's most sexually explicit song, "Wood" uses double entendres and sexual innuendos involving superstitions to describe the narrator's sexual satisfaction with her partner.

Some music critics praised the production of "Wood" as lively and its lyrics as playful and considered it a standout track on The Life of a Showgirl. Others criticized its lyrics as cringeworthy and juvenile and regarded its sound as derivative. Commercially, "Wood" peaked at number six on the Billboard Global 200 and number five on the national charts of Australia, Canada, and the United States. It also reached the top 10 in New Zealand and the Philippines and the top 20 in several other countries. The song received certifications in Australia, Brazil, Canada, New Zealand, and the United Kingdom.

== Release and production ==
Taylor Swift wrote and produced her twelfth studio album, The Life of a Showgirl, with Max Martin and Shellback during the European leg of the Eras Tour in 2024. Inspired by the tour and her romantic relationship with Travis Kelce, she conceived The Life of a Showgirl as a vibrant and lively album reflecting her state of mind at the time. She announced the album on Kelce's podcast New Heights in August 2025; "Wood" was revealed as the ninth track. The Life of a Showgirl was released on October 3, 2025, through Republic Records. A demo recording of "Wood", documenting its songwriting process, was released on October 9 as part of the iTunes-exclusive Deluxe So Glamorous Cabaret Version of the album.

"Wood" was produced at MXM Studios and Shellback Studios in Stockholm, Sweden, and recorded at the latter by Martin, Shellback, and Lasse Mårtén. Martin played piano and keyboards, while Shellback played bass, drums, guitar, and percussion. Other musicians contributed additional bass, electric guitar, percussion, violin, cello, flute, trombone, clavinet, vibraphone, baritone saxophone, flugelhorn, bass clarinet, alto flute, Rhodes piano, and English horn. Mattias Bylund arranged the strings and horns, the latter alongside Andreas Andersson. Erik Arvinder and Willem Bleeker recorded and engineered the violins at IMRSV Studios in Stockholm, while Bylund engineered the strings and horns at Studio 112 in Jonstorp, Sweden. The track was mixed by Serban Ghenea at MixStar Studios in Virginia Beach, Virginia, and mastered by Randy Merrill at Sterling Sound Studios in Edgewater, New Jersey.

== Composition ==
"Wood"
A sample of "Wood", featuring a Motown-inspired funky production that combines drums, electric guitars, heavy bass, and clavinet

"Wood" is two minutes and thirty seconds long. Swift conceived it with the intention of creating a "throwback, kind of timeless-sounding song". A Motown-inspired track, "Wood" incorporates disco, dance, pop soul, synth-funk, and synth-pop. It features elements of 1960s and 1970s disco, funk, and jangly pop; the music theorist Chelsey Hamm considered it one of the album's "musically nostalgic" tracks. The song's upbeat production combines drums, electric guitars, and heavy bass, with subdued strings and horns. It features synth stabs, disco-pop hooks, funk-pop guitar riffs, and a rhythm and blues chorus. The song incorporates "suggestive, sensual" vocal ad-libs, as well as "little sighs" and "ah" sounds.

Several music journalists compared "Wood" to the music of the Jackson 5, (Note: As discussed by The Independent's Roisin O'Connor, Variety's Chris Willman, The Line of Best Fit's Michael Hoffman, Business Insider's Callie Ahlgrim, The Arts Desk's Joe Muggs, and RTÉ.ie's Sarah McIntyre) particularly their song "I Want You Back" (1969), citing similarities in the guitar riff, groove, and intro. The music analysts Nate Sloan and Charlie Harding believed that the intro of "Wood" resembled that of "I Want You Back" in its pedal point and percussive octave guitar playing. Journalists also compared "Wood" to Diana Ross's song "I'm Coming Out" (1980) and the music of Carly Rae Jepsen and Stevie Wonder. Sloan and Harding drew parallels between "Wood" and Wonder's song "Superstition" (1972), noting their shared use of clavinet. Alexis Petridis of The Guardian likened "Wood" to the mellow, disco-influenced music of late-1970s "west coast singer-songwriters", with four-on-the-floor rhythms and chicken-scratch guitars.

Upon its release, "Wood" was described by several journalists as Swift's most sexually explicit song. (Note: As discussed by Willman, The Wall Street Journal's Elias Leight and Ashley Wong, Entertainment Weekly's Allison DeGrushe, The New York Times's Esther Zuckerman, The A.V. Club's Mary Kate Carr, and Numéro's Violaine Schütz) It uses double entendres and sexual innuendos to describe superstitious actions that allude to the narrator's sexual satisfaction with her partner. Swift initially conceived the lyric "I ain't gotta knock on wood" and intended to write a song about superstitions, but the songwriting took a more sexually suggestive direction as she collaborated with Martin and Shellback in the studio. She described the result as a "very, very sentimental love song" with a narrative device of "popular superstitions, good luck charms, [and] bad luck charms". The lyrics reference several superstitions, including unlucky pennies, black cats, knocking on wood, and stepping on cracks. In the lyrics, the narrator reflects on her past romantic misfortunes and expresses confidence in the stability of her current relationship, believing that she no longer needs to knock on wood to ward off bad luck.

The lyrics contain numerous innuendos and euphemisms that allude to the male genitalia, with references to hard rocks, magic wands, and redwood trees, which include the world's largest and tallest trees. In the post-chorus, the narrator describes being "ah-matized" by her lover, a censored variation of the slang term "dickmatized", which denotes intense sexual attraction to a man. She also references reaching "New Heights of manhood", with "New Heights" capitalized in the official lyrics; journalists interpreted the lyric as both a sexual innuendo and a reference to Kelce's podcast New Heights. (Note: As discussed by The Hollywood Reporter's James Hibberd, Elle Australia's Angela Law, Heart's Hope Wilson, People's Marina Watts, Harper's Bazaar's Joel Calfee, and Capital's Katie Louise Smith) Discussing "Wood" in the promotional film The Official Release Party of a Showgirl, Swift described it as being about superstitions and "things like that" with no further explanation, which prompted laughter from theatergoers. In a later interview, she characterized its ambiguity as "the joy of the double entendre", stating that "you could read that song for people and it just goes right over their head."

== Critical reception ==
"Wood" was praised by some critics as a lively and groovy track, with cheerful guitar playing and an "infectious" beat. Some picked it as a standout on the album, and a particularly interesting track. The Line of Best Fit's Michael Hoffman commended its musical experimentation and "free, bold, unafraid" energy. The Wall Street Journal's Mark Richardson praised the production and Swift's joyful vocals, adding that the song features a "strutting sense of propulsion utterly absent elsewhere on the record." The sexually suggestive lyrics were received favorably by some critics, who characterized "Wood" as playful and cheeky. People's Jeff Nelson called the song sexy and "titillating", and The Hollywood Reporter's Nicole Fell dubbed it "exceptionally fun". Numéro's Violaine Schütz regarded its erotic style as suitable for Swift. Some reviewers believed that it represented an unusually explicit or sexually daring side of Swift, deeming it surprising and candid.

Some critics praised aspects of "Wood" but took issue with the lyrics. (Note: As discussed by McIntyre, Rolling Stone's Maya Georgi, Le Journal de Québec's Cédric Bélanger, The Observer's Kitty Empire, SLUG's Palak Jayswal, and The Wall Street Journal's Mark Richardson) Rolling Stone's Maya Georgi believed that the horn section rescued "Wood" from becoming a "misstep" because of its "gauche lyrics and thinly veiled metaphors", and Clash's Lauren Hague praised Swift's "gutsy" vocal performance and the song's suitability for the showgirl aesthetic but felt that its lyrics "border on the cringe". Exclaim!'s Kieran Lauzier enjoyed the track but thought that its explicitness was "a little jarring" considering Swift's previous "super carefully sanitized" releases. The literary critic Stephanie Burt described "Wood" as a "call, one that is still needed, for women to value their sexual pleasure", while also deeming it a "goofy-ass piece of writing."

The lyrics of "Wood" were variously criticized as cringeworthy, (Note: As discussed by McIntyre, Richardson, Paste's Ellen Johnson, The Australian's Jules LeFevre, Clash's Lauren Hague, The New Yorker's Amanda Petrusich, Slate's Carl Wilson, Der Tagesspiegel's Inga Barthels, and the Finnish Broadcasting Company's editors) awkward, juvenile, and lacking in sophistication or depth. (Note: As discussed by Beats Per Minute's John Wohlmacher, The Guardian's Alexis Petridis, Paste's Cassidy Sollazzo, De Standaard's Nick De Leu, De Telegraaf's Richard van de Crommert, and The Free Press's Kat Rosenfield) Spencer Kornhaber of The Atlantic described them as "so uninspired—neither funny nor specific nor even memorably gross". Some critics also deemed the lyrics unsexy and believed that they failed to convey eroticism convincingly. Jonathan Keefe of Slant Magazine and Callie Ahlgrim of Business Insider regarded "Wood" as evidence of Swift's diminished ability to portray romance in a compelling or inventive manner, and Graeme Thomson of The Spectator believed that sexual songwriting was not among her strengths. Other critics viewed the Jackson 5-influenced sound as derivative (Note: As discussed by Sollazzo, Schütz, Muggs, Carl Wilson, Esquire's Alan Light, and The Spectator's Graeme Thomson) and the sexually suggestive songwriting as an attempt to emulate Sabrina Carpenter's work (Note: As discussed by Sollazzo, Carr, De Leu, Carl Wilson, Consequence's Wren Graves, and Exclaim!'s Alex Hudson) and follow "the trend for winking, sexual pop". Consequence's Wren Graves and The A.V. Club's Mary Kate Carr both deemed it an unsuccessful imitation of Carpenter's music. Ahlgrim named "Wood" the worst song on The Life of a Showgirl, and Paste included it among the worst songs of 2025.

== Commercial performance ==
"Wood" debuted and peaked at number six on the Billboard Global 200 chart dated October 18, 2025. The track reached number five on the national charts of Australia, Canada, and the United States, and number six in New Zealand. It also peaked at number seven on the Philippines Hot 100 and number nine on the Official Philippines Chart. Elsewhere, "Wood" reached the top 20 at number 11 in Singapore and Sweden, number 12 in Denmark, Luxembourg, and the United Arab Emirates, and number 13 in Portugal. It also charted in Norway (21), Hong Kong (24), Lithuania and Spain (36), Finland (38), Brazil (44), Argentina (50), France (59), and Italy (75). "Wood" was certified platinum in Brazil and Canada, gold in Australia and New Zealand, and silver in the United Kingdom.

== Personnel ==
Credits are adapted from the liner notes of The Life of a Showgirl.

- Taylor Swift – songwriting, production, lead vocals
- Max Martin – songwriting, production, recording, piano, keyboards
- Shellback – songwriting, production, recording, bass, drums, guitar, percussion
- Stefan Pettersson – bass
- Erik Arvinder – violin, violin recording and engineering
- Conny Lindgren – violin
- Daniela Bonfiglioli – violin
- Fredrik Syberg – violin
- Lola Torrente – violin
- Mattias Johansson – violin
- David Bukovinszky – cello
- Tomas Jonsson – flute, baritone saxophone
- Wojtek Goral – flute, baritone saxophone
- Janne Bjerger – flugelhorn
- Magnus Johansson – flugelhorn
- Peter Noos Johansson – trombone
- Andreas Andersson – bass clarinet, alto flute, horn arrangements
- Helena Stjernstrom – English horn
- Magnus Sjolander – percussion
- Miko Rezler – percussion
- Stefan Wingefors – clavinet
- Thomas Hellsten – clavinet
- Mattias Bylund – Rhodes piano, vibraphone, string and horn arrangements, string and horn engineering and editing
- Johan Randen – electric guitar
- Henrik Langemyr – strings copyist
- Lasse Mårtén – recording, engineering
- Willem Bleeker – violin recording and engineering
- Serban Ghenea – mixing
- Bryce Bordone – assistant mixing engineering
- Randy Merrill – mastering
- Ryan Smith – vinyl mastering

== Charts ==
Chart performance
| Chart (2025) | Peak position |
|---|---|
| Argentina Hot 100 (Billboard) | 50 |
| Australia (ARIA) | 5 |
| Brazil Hot 100 (Billboard) | 44 |
| Canada Hot 100 (Billboard) | 5 |
| Czech Republic Singles Digital (ČNS IFPI) | 29 |
| Denmark (Tracklisten) | 12 |
| Finland (Suomen virallinen lista) | 38 |
| France (SNEP) | 59 |
| Global 200 (Billboard) | 6 |
| Greece International (IFPI) | 9 |
| Guatemala Anglo Airplay (Monitor Latino) | 13 |
| Hong Kong (Billboard) | 24 |
| India International (IMI) | 16 |
| Italy (FIMI) | 75 |
| Latvia Streaming (LaIPA) | 13 |
| Lithuania (AGATA) | 36 |
| Luxembourg (Billboard) | 12 |
| Malaysia International (RIM) | 20 |
| New Zealand (Recorded Music NZ) | 6 |
| Norway (VG-lista) | 21 |
| Philippines (IFPI) | 9 |
| Philippines Hot 100 (Billboard Philippines) | 7 |
| Poland Streaming (OLiS) | 45 |
| Portugal (AFP) | 13 |
| Singapore (RIAS) | 11 |
| Slovakia Singles Digital (ČNS IFPI) | 41 |
| Spain (Promusicae) | 36 |
| Sweden (Sverigetopplistan) | 11 |
| United Arab Emirates (IFPI) | 12 |
| UK Streaming (OCC) | 10 |
| UK Video Streaming (OCC) | 67 |
| US Billboard Hot 100 | 5 |

== Certifications ==
Certifications
| Region | Certification | Certified units/sales |
|---|---|---|
| Australia (ARIA) | Gold | 35,000^{‡} |
| Brazil (Pro-Música Brasil) | Platinum | 40,000^{‡} |
| Canada (Music Canada) | Platinum | 80,000^{‡} |
| New Zealand (RMNZ) | Gold | 15,000^{‡} |
| United Kingdom (BPI) | Silver | 200,000^{‡} |
^{‡} Sales+streaming figures based on certification alone.
