= Cleveland! =

Song by Taylor Swift

from the album The Life of a Showgirl: The Encore
- Released: September 25, 2026
- Genre: Pop; piano rock
- Length: 3:26
- Label: Republic
- Songwriters: Taylor Swift; Max Martin; Shellback
- Producers: Taylor Swift; Max Martin; Shellback

Lyric video
- "Cleveland!" on YouTube

"Cleveland!" is a song by the American singer-songwriter Taylor Swift, from The Life of a Showgirl: The Encore (2026), the deluxe edition of her twelfth studio album, The Life of a Showgirl (2025). Swift wrote and produced the track with Max Martin and Shellback. "Cleveland!" was released on September 25, 2026, by Republic Records, along with the deluxe album.

The song is a lighthearted tribute to Swift's husband, the American football player Travis Kelce, and his hometown Cleveland Heights, a suburb of Cleveland. In the lyrics, Swift addresses the negative remarks she has received about her appearance, relationships, and personality, contrasting them with Kelce's love. Musically, "Cleveland!" is a theatrical pop and rock song, supported by a jaunty piano line, snare drums, jingle bells, and xylophone.

Upon release, "Cleveland!" received mixed reviews from music critics; some praised its audacious and frivolous quality while others considered it a subpar track in Swift's discography. In honor of the song, Destination Cleveland added exclamation marks to its signs across the city. Commercially, the song reached the top ten on the national charts of Australia, Austria, Ireland, New Zealand, the United Kingdom, and the United States.

== Background and release ==
American singer-songwriter Taylor Swift released her twelfth studio album, The Life of a Showgirl, on October 3, 2025. Written and produced by Swift, Max Martin, and Shellback, the trio took a trip to Sweden after it was released, where they recorded four further tracks in Martin and Shellback's studio. These tracks, including "Cleveland!", were released on September 23, 2026, on a deluxe version of her 2025 album, The Life of a Showgirl: The Encore; and constituted her first new music since marrying Travis Kelce on July 3, 2026.

== Composition ==
"Cleveland!" is a lively pop song with a theatrical production driven by a jaunty piano line, "snappy" marching quarter-note snare drums, "Christmassy" bells, and xylophone. Therefore, it has also been described as a piano rock song. The exclamation mark in the song title is a reference to Kelce, whom Swift has described as a "human exclamation point". The song references all types of criticism and internet trolling Swift has received over the years, ironically giving her detractors permission to express their thoughts, while contrasting such remarks with Kelce's love and acceptance of who she is.

The first verse draws inspiration from remarks about Swift's body, personality, dancing, fashion choices, and romantic life, with Swift agreeing to them all rather than attempting to disprove. The second verse references remarks on her age and that "Travis could have found someone younger", engaging with a broader cultural anxiety surrounding women and desirability. The song is an ode to her husband, and a straightforward declaration of love to him, as well as his hometown Cleveland Heights, a suburb of Cleveland. The bridge incorporates a spoken word monologue, announcing that Kelce is "the one". The final chorus references the wedding of Swift and Kelce.

== Critical reception ==
Critics commented on "Cleveland!" in their reviews of The Encore. Chris Willman of Variety wrote that Swift is a "love-besotted goofball" in the song, which he considered a 1980s synthpop-inspired fusion of her audacious, celebratory songs like "Me!" (2019), "So High School" (2024), and "Wood" (2026). Will Hodgkinson of The Sunday Times and Melissa Ruggieri of USA Today both thought the song is the "catchiest" amongst the four additional songs, showcasing the best aspect of Swift's relatable writing about the intersection of self-awareness and romantic love. Ruggieri praised the music's "jangly gallop" in the verses and the chorus for evoking 1980s television themes. Aisling Murphy of The Globe and Mail harkened the song to "a postcard from a honeymoon", complimenting its liked unapologetic lyrics and "schmaltzy" bridge. Caitlin Napier of Marie Claire wrote that the song, "beneath its deliberately Showgirl-esque veneer", is about being loved in defiance of public consensus, and appreciated its "comic, happily-ever-after" theme.

Craig Jenkins of Vulture described "Cleveland!" as a honest and realistic albeit odd song about "the power couple's media ever-presence, which draws as much excited attention as eye-rolling". Michael Savio of Slant claimed "Cleveland!" is the "most egregious blunder" on the deluxe, taking issue with its "tepid" self-deprecation and Swift's talk-singing cadence in the verses. He dismissed the song as just "another screed against her critics" in line with other The Life of a Showgirl tracks "Cancelled!" and "Actually Romantic". Poppie Platt of The Daily Telegraph felt underwhelmed by the song's lyrics, dubbing the Reputation (2017) tracks "King of My Heart", "Call It What You Want" and "New Year's Day" as better love songs than "Cleveland!". Callie Ahgrim of Business Insider claimed that "Cleveland" will go down as one of Swift's worst songs; Ahlgrim said that while she is a fan of Swift confronting her critics, "Cleveland!" does that with neither the finesse nor the appeal of "Mean" (2011), "Shake It Off" and "Blank Space" (both 2014).

The Independent writer Roisin O'Connor negatively compared it to "The Last Great American Dynasty" (2020), commenting that Swift has written better songs about tackling criticism than "Cleveland!" Exclaim!'s Alex Hudson compared the song's music to Los Campesinos! and dubbed the lyrics "vapidly juvenile". Laura Snapes of The Guardian described it as self-satisfactory "dogshit" and a "cut-and-shut of two of her worst songs ever"—"Me!" and "Honey" (2025).

== Commercial performance and reaction ==
The song debuted at number three on the UK singles chart and the Billboard Hot 100. In honor of the song, Destination Cleveland added exclamation points to its script signs across Cleveland at Euclid Beach Park, Edgewater Park, Tremont, North Coast Harbor and Cleveland Hopkins International Airport. On their podcast New Heights, Kelce and his brother Jason expressed their admiration for the song; Travis Kelce thanked Swift for making the song and giving Cleveland "a little more life".

Upon release, "Cleveland!" was met with disdain from a significant amount of social media users for its simplistic lyrics and sound, including some of her fans. The Washington Post reported that the early reaction to song was "instantly divisive" amongst fans. Entertainment Weekly remarked on the online reception, saying "haters be damned, as the song itself is a message to those who criticize Swift and her relationship." Willman of Variety also compared Swift in 2026 to Paul McCartney in 1971, saying "Cleveland!" is Swift's "Silly Love Songs" (1976), a song McCartney wrote with his wife Linda in response to criticism towards his songs about "matrimony and domestic bliss". The Pretenders frontwoman Chrissie Hynde defended the song, saying she liked it and that Swift "might be the only person in history who has actually written a song about Cleveland", and added that Swift is always "on the cutting edge".

== Personnel ==
Adapted from Tidal

- Taylor Swift – writer, producer, lead vocals, background vocals
- Lasse Mårtén – recording
- Max Martin – recording, programming, writer, producer, glockenspiel, piano, keyboard, background vocals
- Shellback – recording, programming, writer, producer, bass guitar, drum set, guitar, percussion, keyboard, background vocals
- Serban Ghenea – mixing
- Bryce Bordone – assistant mixing

== Charts ==
Chart performance for "Cleveland!"
Chart (2026)	Peak Position
Australia (ARIA)	3
Austria (Ö3 Austria Top 40)	6
France (SNEP)	170
Germany (GfK)	13
Global 200 (Billboard)	2
Greece International (IFPI)	26
Ireland (IRMA)	9
Netherlands (Single Top 100)	64
New Zealand (Recorded Music NZ)	6
Norway (IFPI Norge)	46
Philippines (Philippines Hot 100)	40
Singapore (RIAS)	17
Sweden (Sverigetopplistan)	20
Switzerland (Schweizer Hitparade)	13
UK Singles (Official Charts)	3
US Billboard Hot 100	3
US Adult Pop Airplay (Billboard)	35
