= The Life of a Showgirl (song) =

2025 song by Taylor Swift featuring Sabrina Carpenter

Song by Taylor Swift featuring Sabrina Carpenter

from the album The Life of a Showgirl
- Released: October 3, 2025
- Studio: MXM (Stockholm); Shellback (Stockholm); IMRSV (Stockholm); Studio 112 (Jonstorp)
- Genre: Country pop
- Length: 4:01
- Label: Republic
- Songwriters: Taylor Swift; Max Martin; Shellback
- Producers: Taylor Swift; Max Martin; Shellback

Lyric video
- "The Life of a Showgirl" on YouTube

"The Life of a Showgirl" is a song by the American singer-songwriter Taylor Swift featuring the American singer Sabrina Carpenter. Written and produced by the former alongside Max Martin and Shellback, it is the titular and closing track of Swift's twelfth studio album, The Life of a Showgirl (2025). It has been nominated for Best Pop Duo/Group Performance at the forthcoming 69th Annual Grammy Awards.

== Background ==
Taylor Swift created her twelfth studio album, The Life of a Showgirl, to reflect on her triumphant state of mind amidst the success of the Eras Tour and her relationship with the football player Travis Kelce in 2024. She recorded the album with the producers Max Martin and Shellback in Sweden during May–August 2024, in between the European stops of the Eras Tour. Swift announced the album during the August 13, 2025, episode of Travis and Jason Kelce's podcast New Heights; "The Life of a Showgirl" was revealed as the twelfth and final track, with Carpenter being revealed as a feature. The album was released on October 3, 2025, via Republic Records.

== Composition ==
"The Life of a Showgirl"
A sample of "The Life of a Showgirl", featuring slide guitars, synthesizers, and strings

"The Life of a Showgirl" is a mid-tempo country pop ballad with an instrumental that features slide guitars, synthesizers, and strings. Lyrically, the song begins in narration of the life a showgirl named "Kitty", who "made her money being pretty and witty". It delves into Kitty's backstory, then recounts an interaction between Kitty and the narrator. Toward the end, the song shifts to the narrator's struggles with fame as a showgirl. The song ends with a spoken outro that depicts Swift and Carpenter closing a show together, with crowd noise sampled from the Eras Tour concert in Vancouver. According to Hindustan Times, Internet users noted the song as having similarities to Colbie Caillat's "Brighter Than the Sun" (2011) and the Jonas Brothers's "Cool" (2019).

== Critical reception ==
The song received mixed reviews from critics. Pitchfork described the song as "a little schmaltzy", but also "proactive about introducing an independent personality with a story to tell", calling it "one of the moments when, musically, The Life of a Showgirl brushes up against a much better idea", and further described it as "a big, glorious pageant that inspires organic passion and camaraderie". The Independent said that the song "serves as a grand finale, pairing the two singers' voices in shimmering harmony as Swift symbolically takes a bow and hands the spotlight to the next generation." Clash wrote that the song "doesn't quite bring clarity to a scattered collection of songs", and Consequence called the song "surprisingly limp". In a ranking of the album's twelve tracks, Jason Lipshutz of Billboard placed it at number six, saying the song's narrative "gets a bit knotty, but Swift and Carpenter's respective tones complement one another splendidly". Rob Sheffield of Rolling Stone placed it number 41 on his ranking of all 286 songs in Swift's discography.

== Accolades ==
Accolades received by "The Life of a Showgirl"
Organization	Year (Note: Indicates the year of ceremony. Each year is linked to the article about the awards held that year, wherever possible.)	Category	Result	Ref(s).
Grammy Awards	2027	Best Pop Duo/Group Performance	Pending	
Nickelodeon Kids' Choice Awards	2026	Favorite Music Collaboration	Nominated	

== Personnel ==
Credits are adapted from the liner notes of The Life of a Showgirl.

Studios

- Produced at MXM Studios and Shellback Studios, Stockholm
- Recorded at Shellback Studios, Stockholm
- Violins recorded and engineered at IMRSV Studios, Stockholm
- Horns recorded and engineered at Studio 112, Jonstorp, Sweden
- Mixed at MixStar Studios, Virginia Beach
- Mastered at Sterling Sound, Edgewater, New Jersey

Personnel

- Taylor Swift – lead vocals, songwriting, production
- Sabrina Carpenter – lead vocals
- Max Martin – production, songwriting, piano, keyboards, recording
- Shellback – production, songwriting, programming, bass, drums, guitar, percussion, keyboards, recording
- Anders Pettersson – pedal steel guitar
- Per Strandberg – banjo, mandolin, electric guitar
- Erik Arvinder – violin, recording, engineering
- Conny Lindgren – violin
- Daniela Bonfiglioli – violin
- Fredrik Syberg – violin
- Lola Torrente – violin
- Matthias Johansson – violin
- David Bukovinsky – cello
- Tomas Jonsson – clarinet, baritone saxophone, tenor saxophone, flute
- Wojtek Goral – flute, alto saxophone
- Janne Bjerger – trumpet
- Magnus Johansson – trumpet
- Peter Noos Johansson – trombone
- Helena Stjernstrom – English horn
- Mattias Bylund – upright piano, synth strings, orchestra arrangements, recording, engineering
- Johan Randén – electric guitar
- Henrik Langemyr – strings copyist
- Lasse Mårtén – recording, engineering
- Willem Bleeker – recording, engineering
- Stefan Pettersson – recording, engineering
- Serban Ghenea – mixing
- Bryce Bordone – assistant mixing
- Randy Merrill – mastering

== Charts ==
Chart performance
Chart (2025–2026)	Peak position
Argentina Hot 100 (Billboard)	55
Australia (ARIA)	6
Brazil Hot 100 (Billboard)	46
Canada Hot 100 (Billboard)	6
Canada Hot AC (Billboard)	39
Czech Republic Singles Digital (ČNS IFPI)	31
Denmark (Tracklisten)	13
Finland (Suomen virallinen lista)	40
France (SNEP)	44
Germany (GfK)	9
Global 200 (Billboard)	8
Greece International (IFPI)	6
Hong Kong (Billboard)	18
India International (IMI)	13
Italy (FIMI)	73
Japan Hot Overseas (Billboard Japan)	7
Latvia Streaming (LaIPA)	16
Lithuania (AGATA)	32
Luxembourg (Billboard)	10
Malaysia (Billboard)	18
Malaysia International (RIM)	17
Middle East and North Africa (IFPI)	18
New Zealand (Recorded Music NZ)	7
Norway (VG-lista)	15
Philippines (IFPI)	9
Philippines Hot 100 (Billboard Philippines)	9
Poland Streaming (OLiS)	41
Portugal (AFP)	11
Singapore (RIAS)	8
Slovakia Singles Digital (ČNS IFPI)	39
Spain (Promusicae)	34
Sweden (Sverigetopplistan)	6
Switzerland Streaming (Schweizer Hitparade)	8
United Arab Emirates (IFPI)	9
UK Singles (Official Charts)	46
Uruguay Anglo Airplay (Monitor Latino)	11
US Billboard Hot 100	8
US Adult Contemporary (Billboard)	28
US Adult Pop Airplay (Billboard)	32
US Pop Airplay (Billboard)	38

== Certifications ==
Certifications
Region	Certification	Certified units/sales
Australia (ARIA)	Gold	35,000^{‡}
Brazil (Pro-Música Brasil)	Platinum	40,000^{‡}
Canada (Music Canada)	Platinum	80,000^{‡}
New Zealand (RMNZ)	Gold	15,000^{‡}
United Kingdom (BPI)	Gold	400,000
^{‡} Sales+streaming figures based on certification alone.
