= Father Figure (Taylor Swift song) =

2025 song by Taylor Swift

Song by Taylor Swift

from the album The Life of a Showgirl
- Released: October 3, 2025
- Studio: MXM; Shellback (Stockholm)
- Genre: Orchestral pop; R&B
- Length: 3:32
- Label: Republic
- Songwriters: Taylor Swift; Max Martin; Shellback; George Michael
- Producers: Taylor Swift; Max Martin; Shellback

Lyric video
- "Father Figure" on YouTube

"Father Figure" is a song by the American singer-songwriter Taylor Swift from her twelfth studio album, The Life of a Showgirl (2025). An orchestral pop and R&B ballad, it interpolated parts of the melody of George Michael's 1987 song "Father Figure". Critics have speculated that the song may be inspired by Swift's early career and her masters dispute. Commercially, it reached the top 10 on the Billboard Global 200 and the national charts in Australia, Canada, Denmark, Germany, Iceland, Luxembourg, New Zealand, Norway, the Philippines, Portugal, Singapore, Sweden, the United Arab Emirates, and the United States.

== Background ==
Taylor Swift wrote and produced her twelfth studio album, The Life of a Showgirl, with Max Martin and Shellback during the European leg of the Eras Tour in 2024. Inspired by the tour and her romantic relationship with Travis Kelce, she conceived The Life of a Showgirl as a vibrant and lively album reflecting her state of mind at the time. She announced the album on Kelce's podcast New Heights in August 2025; "Father Figure" was revealed as the fourth track. The Life of a Showgirl was released on October 3, 2025, through Republic Records.

== Composition ==
"Father Figure"
The final chorus of "Father Figure" is accompanied by a key change and intensified orchestration.

At 3 minutes and 32 seconds long, "Father Figure" is a pop, orchestral pop, and R&B ballad with a tempo of 94 beats per minute. The track is built around what Ann Powers of NPR called "an almost martial drumbeat". Its production is driven by a sturdy bassline played by an upright bass and incorporates a prominent string orchestra played by an ensemble of Swedish musicians, brooding synths, and layered vocal harmonies. The song features crowd noises at the beginning and Omnichords at the end of the second verse.

The bridge features a 1970s-inspired circle-of-fourths chord progression and opens with disco chords and swelling strings. Kitty Empire of The Observer described its string swell as having an "old Hollywood" quality. In its second half, Swift adopts a lower vocal register and a more conversational delivery. The bridge is followed by a breakdown section in which steady eighth notes played by the bass gradually intensify the music. The final chorus incorporates intensified orchestration and a key change from G major to A major. The music scholar Joe Bennett characterized the final chorus as "so sweetly sung" but perceived "utter rage" in Swift's delivery. Shaad D'Souza from Pitchfork wrote that the overall production was "chilly, spectral", resembling "Beach House by way of Carly Rae Jepsen".

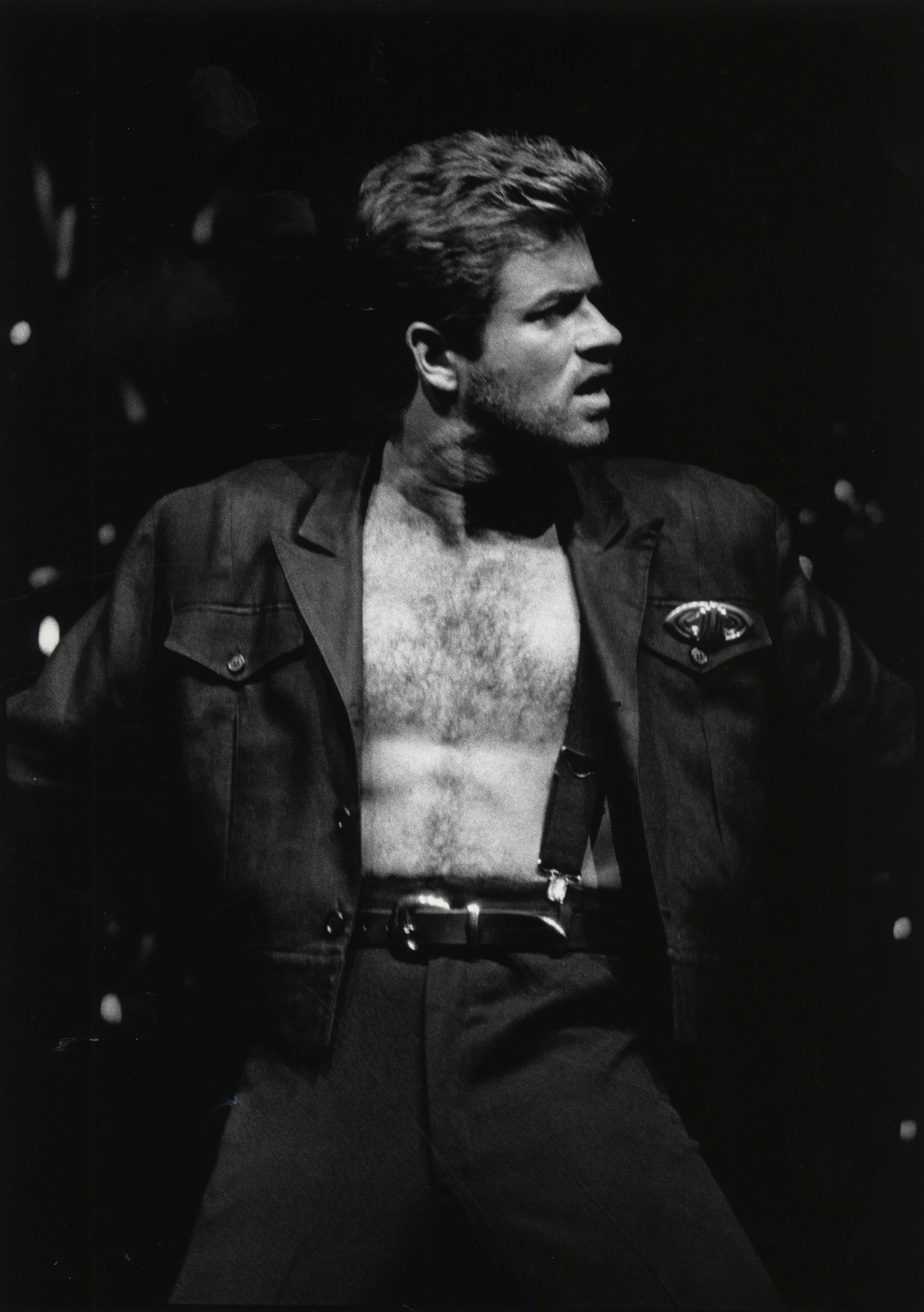
"Father Figure" interpolates the song "Father Figure" (1987) by George Michael.

The track interpolates the song "Father Figure" (1987) by George Michael, using the lyric "I'll be your father figure" and a similar melody, leading to him being credited as a co-writer. Some critics contended that the melodic interpolation was rather minimal. (Note: References:) Beats Per Minute's John Wolhmacher argued that there was little resemblance to Michael's song and compared the two tracks: whereas Michael sings the line "I will be your father figure" in a monotone, Swift sings "I'll be your father figure" in her upper, "quasi-falsetto" vocal register. The music analysts Charlie Harding and Nate Sloan commented that there was a similar cadence in the hooks of both. Bennett argued that their shared descending melodic fragment was too commonplace to qualify as a copyrighted melody; he regarded Swift's melody as "objectively new" and opined that she did not need to credit Michael.

In an interview with Jimmy Fallon, Swift stated the song depicted a mentor–protégé relationship, written from the perspective of the mentor, or the "father figure". She added that she could relate to both characters in certain parts of the song and that she drew inspiration from the character of Logan Roy in the television series Succession. The central narrative is about revenge and betrayal. The "father figure" tells his protégé, a boy who resembles a younger version of him, that he will guide him to success and demands loyalty: "I can make deals with the devil because my dick's bigger / This love is pure profit." By the bridge and final chorus, the relationship between the mentor and protégé deteriorates; the "father figure" proclaims to be triumphant: "This empire belongs to me / Leave it with me."

Bennett considered Swift's choice to write from the perspective of an egotistical and ruthless character a challenging songwriting decision, explaining that popular music typically features sympathetic narrators with whom listeners can identify. Following the song's release, critics have suggested that the lyrics reference Swift's early career and her business relationship with Scott Borchetta, including the subsequent sale of her master recordings to Scooter Braun. Journalists have interpreted the song's lyrics as referring to her master's dispute, asserting that the line "When I found you, you were young" alludes to her initial signing with Big Machine. Lyrics like "I can make deals with the devil 'cause my dick's bigger'" and "This love is pure profit" have been interpreted as a reference to how Big Machine Records used Swift as a major source of profit after her initial success.

== Critical reception ==
Some critics considered "Father Figure" a standout or the best track from the album. Pitchfork's Shaad D'Souza considered "Father Figure" a standout from the album, describing it as Swift's "most straightforward appraisal of her own power". D'Souza described how it hides its bitterness "beneath actual jokes". Variety described Swift's "lingering capacity for pure vituperation" in contrast to her romance songs. The New York Times described Swift as singing the song with "cool nerve" and being an "assassin acquiring her target". The Guardian stated the song has "some spiky lines here and there", though "they don't really click", in part because the song revisited "very well-trodden ground".

== Personnel ==
Credits are adapted from the liner notes of The Life of a Showgirl.

Studios

- Produced at MXM Studios and Shellback Studios, Stockholm
- Recorded at Shellback Studios, Stockholm
- Violins recorded and engineered at IMRSV Studios, Stockholm
- Horns recorded and engineered at Studio 112, Jonstorp, Sweden
- Strings engineered and edited at Studio 112, Jonstorp, Sweden
- Mixed at MixStar Studios, Virginia Beach
- Mastered at Sterling Sound, Edgewater, New Jersey

Personnel

- Taylor Swift – lead vocals, songwriting, production
- Max Martin – production, songwriting, programming, keyboards, recording
- Shellback – production, songwriting, programming, bass, drums, guitar, keyboards, Omnichord, percussion, recording
- David Bukovinsky – cello
- Tomas Jonsson – clarinet
- Johan Randén – electric guitar
- Stefan Wingefors – upright bass
- Mattias Bylund – Hammond organ, orchestra arrangements, recording, engineering, digital editing
- Erik Arvinder – violin, recording, engineering
- Conny Lindgren – violin
- Daniela Bonfiglioli – violin
- Fredrik Syberg – violin
- Lola Torrente – violin
- Matthias Johansson – violin
- Henrik Langemyr – strings copyist
- Willem Bleeker – recording, engineering
- Stefan Pettersson – recording, engineering
- Lasse Mårtén – recording, engineering
- Serban Ghenea – mixing
- Bryce Bordone – assistant mixing
- Randy Merrill – mastering

== Charts ==
Chart performance
Chart (2025–2026)	Peak position
Argentina Hot 100 (Billboard)	35
Australia (ARIA)	4
Belgium (Ultratop 50 Flanders)	29
Brazil Hot 100 (Billboard)	30
Canada Hot 100 (Billboard)	4
Croatia (Billboard)	16
Czech Republic Singles Digital (ČNS IFPI)	16
Denmark (Tracklisten)	7
Finland (Suomen virallinen lista)	18
France (SNEP)	27
Germany (GfK)	5
Global 200 (Billboard)	4
Greece International (IFPI)	4
Hong Kong (Billboard)	14
Hungary (Single Top 40)	32
Iceland (Tónlistinn)	9
India International (IMI)	6
Ireland (IRMA)	85
Italy (FIMI)	47
Latvia Streaming (LaIPA)	5
Lithuania (AGATA)	14
Luxembourg (Billboard)	6
Malaysia (Billboard)	11
Malaysia International (RIM)	13
Middle East and North Africa (IFPI)	15
New Zealand (Recorded Music NZ)	4
Norway (VG-lista)	9
Philippines (IFPI)	7
Philippines (Philippines Hot 100)	5
Poland (Polish Streaming Top 100)	27
Portugal (AFP)	6
Singapore (RIAS)	5
Slovakia Singles Digital (ČNS IFPI)	25
Spain (Promusicae)	22
Sweden (Sverigetopplistan)	5
Switzerland Streaming (Schweizer Hitparade)	6
Taiwan (Billboard)	22
United Arab Emirates (IFPI)	7
UK Streaming (OCC)	4
UK Video Streaming (OCC)	22
US Billboard Hot 100	4
Vietnam (IFPI)	20

== Certifications ==
Certifications
Region	Certification	Certified units/sales
Australia (ARIA)	Platinum	70,000^{‡}
Brazil (Pro-Música Brasil)	Platinum	40,000^{‡}
Canada (Music Canada)	Platinum	80,000^{‡}
New Zealand (RMNZ)	Gold	15,000^{‡}
United Kingdom (BPI)	Silver	200,000^{‡}
^{‡} Sales+streaming figures based on certification alone.
