= Eldest Daughter =

2025 song by Taylor Swift

Song by Taylor Swift

from the album The Life of a Showgirl
- Released: October 3, 2025
- Studio: MXM; Shellback (Stockholm)
- Genre: Soft rock
- Length: 4:06
- Label: Republic
- Songwriters: Taylor Swift; Max Martin; Shellback
- Producers: Taylor Swift; Max Martin; Shellback

Visualizer video
- "Eldest Daughter" on YouTube

"Eldest Daughter" is a song by the American singer-songwriter Taylor Swift from her twelfth studio album, The Life of a Showgirl (2025). Swift wrote and produced the track with Max Martin and Shellback. "Eldest Daughter" is a soft rock track in the form of a piano ballad. Lyrically, it details Swift's narrator pretending to be tough upon facing others' comments on her on the internet, before opening up herself to love and devotion.

Upon release, some critics took the issue with the lyrics as badly written, pointing to the use of internet slang. Some others upheld the vulnerable songwriting and complimented the production. The track peaked at number 11 on the Billboard Global 200 and reached the top 10 in Australia, Canada, Denmark, New Zealand, the Philippines, Singapore, Sweden, and the United States.

== Background and release ==
The American singer-songwriter Taylor Swift created her twelfth studio album, The Life of a Showgirl, to reflect her triumphant state of mind amidst the success of the Eras Tour and her relationship with the American football player Travis Kelce throughout 2024. She announced the album during the August 13, 2025, episode of Travis and Jason Kelce's podcast New Heights; "Eldest Daughter" was revealed as the album's fifth track, generating wide interest as a "track 5", which is considered by Swifties and music journalists as the emotional centerpiece of an album by Swift, for expressing deep vulnerability and pain.

Swift recorded The Life of a Showgirl in Sweden with the producers Max Martin and Shellback, in-between stops of the Eras Tour. "Eldest Daughter", along with the album, was released on October 3, 2025, via Republic Records. Less than 24 hours of the album's release, an acoustic version subtitled "Now You're Home" was made available as part of a deluxe CD album for 24 hours on October 4, 2025, via Swift's webstore. Five days later, a demo version subtitled "Original Songwriting Voice Memo" was released as part of an exclusive digital-download album edition subtitled So Punk on the Internet, available via Swift's webstore for 6.5 hours. On November 7, an Acoustic Collection edition of the album was released, featuring both the original and acoustic versions of "Eldest Daughter".

== Music and lyrics ==
"Eldest Daughter" is a soft rock song in the form of a piano ballad, set over a piano and simple acoustic guitars. As described by Swift in the Track by Track Version of The Life of a Showgirl (2025), the track is a "love song about personal roles in life". The title is a subtle nod to the "eldest daughter syndrome". Lyrically, "Eldest Daughter" chronicles the progress of Swift's narrator, from struggling to become a perfect individual affected by others' criticisms of her on the internet, to opening herself up to receive love and devotion in a happy relationship. She admits that she was not always truthful to herself ("When I said I don't believe in marriage/ That was a lie"). The lyrics use internet slang ("trolls", "memes", "comments", "I'm not a bad bitch, this isn't savage", "we looked fire").

Music critics associated "Eldest Daughter" to Swift's previous songs such as "The Archer" (from her 2019 album Lover) and "Mirrorball" (from her 2020 album Folklore) having recurring themes of perseverance, desperation, and perfectionism. Alyssa Bailey of Elle interpreted the track as a vow to Swift's fiancé, Travis Kelce, an idea agreed by Time's Megan McClusky, who pointed out the lyric mentioning the "youngest child" as a reference to Kelce. The cultural critic Lisa D. Andres commented that "Eldest Daughter" embodied the same vulnerability as with other "track 5s" on Swift's previous albums, such as "Delicate" from Reputation (2017), "The Archer" from Lover (2019), or "Tolerate It" from Evermore (2020). However, "Eldest Daughter" is notably more uplifting because it ends with hopeful promises of love and devotion ("I'm never gonna break that vow/ I'm never gonna leave you now"), a contrast with the insecurity and self-doubt that had characterized the other "track 5s".

== Reception ==
Upon release, fans and critics took issue with the lyrics using internet slang as being "cringe"-inducing, and opined that the lyrical content surrounding pressures of fame and perceptions did not live up to its premise as a vulnerable "track 5". News.com.au's Nick Bond praised the "pretty" piano sound but criticized the lyrics as "cringeworthy", while Paste's Casey Epstein-Gross wrote that the song "is so clogged with dated slang [...] it collapses into secondhand embarrassment". In separate articles for The New Yorker, Amanda Petrusich and Tyler Foggatt both picked it as one of the worst tracks on The Life of a Showgirl. Petrusich opined that the track's theme of tying one's self-worth to how the internet views their perception made it lacking of the relatability and emotional connection that Swift had been known for through her songwriting. Mary Kate Carr of The A.V. Club regarded "Eldest Daughter" as the album's low point; she opined that its references to internet slang refuted Swift's proclamation that what was written on the internet about her was "none of [her] business".

A positive comment was from Rolling Stone's Maya Georgi, who upheld the vulnerability showcased through "brutal admissions" that balanced out the more cheerful sentiments of the album. Similarly, Atwood Magazine's Bárbara Martínez Campuzano and Danielle Holian deemed "Eldest Daughter" one of the album's most emotionally resonant songs with vulnerable lyricism. Alan Light of Esquire contended that the track, alongside fellow album track "Ruin the Friendship", as one of the "rich, moving examples of a category we'll call Taylor's Origin Story songs". RTÉ's Sarah McIntyre described the track as "gorgeously vulnerable". Maria Sherman of the Associated Press opined that by using "colloquial" language, the track "immediately [dates] itself", but contended that the melody was "thoughtful" and the overall message was a "deep dedication to a loved one". Analyzing the mixed reception from both journalists and fans that the track received, Andres argued that the tonal shift from despair to hope on "Eldest Daughter" was a stark contrast from Swift's previous "track 5s", alienating fans who were accustomed to the old sentiments. Andres also defended the internet slang as "masks" that Swift's narrator employs to highlight the pressure that one puts on themselves, rather than just "cringey and jarring" words being "casually [thrown] in".

As part of a smear campaign against Swift, social media posts attacking the word choice of "savage" in the track interpreted it as racist. "Eldest Daughter" peaked at number 11 on the Billboard Global 200. The track reached in the top 10 in Sweden (peaking at number 7), Germany and the Philippines (number 8), Canada, Denmark, and Singapore (number 9), and Australia and New Zealand (number 10). In the United States, all 12 tracks from The Life of the Showgirl debuted in the top 12 on the Billboard Hot 100, with "Eldest Daughter" debuting and peaking at number nine.

== Credits and personnel ==
Credits adapted from the liner notes of The Life of a Showgirl

Studios

- Produced at MXM Studios and Shellback Studios, Stockholm, Sweden
- Recorded at Shellback Studios, Stockholm
- Mixed at MixStar Studios, Virginia Beach, Virginia
- Mastered at Sterling Sound, Edgewater, New Jersey

Personnel

- Taylor Swift – lead vocals, songwriting, production
- Max Martin – songwriting, production, keyboards, piano, recording
- Shellback – songwriting, production, keyboards, piano, bass guitar, guitar, tambourine, recording
- Lasse Mårtén – recording, engineering
- Serban Ghenea – mixing
- Bryce Bordone – assistant mixing
- Randy Merrill – mastering

== Charts ==
Chart performance
Chart (2025)	Peak position
Argentina Hot 100 (Billboard)	57
Australia (ARIA)	10
Brazil Hot 100 (Billboard)	52
Canada Hot 100 (Billboard)	9
Czech Republic Singles Digital (ČNS IFPI)	25
Denmark (Tracklisten)	9
Finland (Suomen virallinen lista)	30
France (SNEP)	43
Germany (GfK)	8
Global 200 (Billboard)	11
Hong Kong (Billboard)	19
Italy (FIMI)	71
Latvia Streaming (LaIPA)	12
Lithuania (AGATA)	41
Luxembourg (Billboard)	8
New Zealand (Recorded Music NZ)	10
Norway (VG-lista)	14
Philippines (Philippines Hot 100)	8
Portugal (AFP)	12
Singapore (RIAS)	9
Slovakia Singles Digital (ČNS IFPI)	38
Spain (Promusicae)	33
Sweden (Sverigetopplistan)	7
Switzerland Streaming (Schweizer Hitparade)	9
UK Streaming (OCC)	11
United Arab Emirates (IFPI)	11
US Billboard Hot 100	9

== Certifications ==
Certifications
Region	Certification	Certified units/sales
Australia (ARIA)	Gold	35,000^{‡}
Brazil (Pro-Música Brasil)	Platinum	40,000^{‡}
Canada (Music Canada)	Platinum	80,000^{‡}
New Zealand (RMNZ)	Gold	15,000^{‡}
United Kingdom (BPI)	Silver	200,000^{‡}
^{‡} Sales+streaming figures based on certification alone.
