= Wish List (song) =

2025 song by Taylor Swift

Song by Taylor Swift

from the album The Life of a Showgirl
- Released: October 3, 2025
- Studio: MXM; Shellback (Stockholm)
- Genre: Synth-pop; electropop; power ballad
- Length: 3:27
- Label: Republic
- Songwriters: Taylor Swift; Max Martin; Shellback
- Producers: Taylor Swift; Max Martin; Shellback

Lyric video
- "Wish List" on YouTube

"Wish List" (stylized as "Wi$h Li$t") is a song by the American singer-songwriter Taylor Swift from her twelfth studio album, The Life of a Showgirl (2025). Written and produced by Swift, Max Martin and Shellback, it is a 1980s-inspired synth-pop and electropop power ballad, with lyrics about the narrator's desire for love and a peaceful domestic life.

== Background and release ==
The American singer-songwriter Taylor Swift created her twelfth studio album, The Life of a Showgirl, to reflect on her triumphant state of mind amidst the success of the Eras Tour and her relationship with the football player Travis Kelce in 2024. She recorded the album with the producers Max Martin and Shellback in Sweden during May–August 2024, in between the European stops of the Eras Tour. Swift announced the album during the August 13, 2025, episode of Travis and Jason Kelce's podcast New Heights; "Wish List" was revealed as the eighth track.

The Life of a Showgirl was released on October 3, 2025, via Republic Records, with "Wish List" as the eighth track. In an interview on the Heart Breakfast show, Swift revealed that "Wish List" was her favorite song on the album, describing it as "dreamy" and "romantic". She additionally stated that the track was the final song to be written and recorded for The Life of a Showgirl, calling it the album's "final piece".

== Music and lyrics ==
Swift wrote and produced "Wish List" with Martin and Shellback. At 3 minutes and 27 seconds long, it is a 1980s-inspired synth-pop and electropop power ballad. The track is instrumented with chiming synths and a pedal steel guitar, and features Swift's upper register vocals. Mikael Wood of the Los Angeles Times described the sound as "electro-trappy". Maria Sherman of the Associated Press likened the song's production to that of Swift's 2022 album Midnights. Wesley Morris of The New York Times compared Swift's vocal delivery to Beyoncé's "stutters".

Lyrically, Swift wrote "Wish List" to contrast between others' desires from life and hers; whereas others want to have material well-being and excesses (a "yacht life", "bright lights", a Palme d'Or, a contract with Real Madrid), she wants a life with her lover: "Have a couple kids/ got the whole block looking like you." Alexis Petridis of The Guardian summed up the content as "suburban domestic contentment", which reflected Swift's personal journey and resonated with her audiences who once related to songs like "Fifteen" and "Love Story" (2008). Paste's Ellen Johnson argued that "Wish List" shared the same lyrical premise with "Lavender Haze" (2022) but had a different conclusion, while Ariana Brockington of Today.com described the song as a sequel to "So High School" (2024).

== Reception ==
In The New York Times, Lindsay Zoladz dubbed the track "dreamy", and Jon Caramanica deemed it the album's "poppiest track". Rolling Stone's Rob Sheffield described "Wish List" as a "beautifully candid love song" and opined that the line, "Please God bring me a best friend who I think is hot", as Swift's version of Joni Mitchell's lyric, "Send me somebody who's strong and somewhat sincere." Alan Light of Esquire considered the track "pleasant but minor".

Several critics took issue with the lyrics about wanting to settle down and have children, interpreting them as Swift embodying and promoting the "tradwife" idea. Several journalists, as well as the actress Ruby Rose, defended Swift and criticized this discourse as ridiculous or point-missing. In their ranking of 101 moments of 2025, Pitchfork assigned the lyric "I got the whole block looking like you" a 3.4 score.

== Personnel ==
Credits are adapted from the liner notes of The Life of a Showgirl.

=== Studios ===
- Produced at MXM Studios and Shellback Studios, Stockholm
- Recorded at Shellback Studios, Stockholm
- Mixed at MixStar Studios, Virginia Beach
- Mastered at Sterling Sound, Edgewater, New Jersey

=== Personnel ===
- Taylor Swift – lead vocals, songwriting, production
- Max Martin – production, songwriting, keyboards, recording
- Shellback – production, songwriting, programming, bass, guitar, keyboards, percussion, recording
- Anders Pettersson – pedal steel guitar
- Lasse Mårtén – recording, engineering
- Serban Ghenea – mixing
- Bryce Bordone – assistant mixing
- Randy Merrill – mastering

== Charts ==
Chart performance
| Chart (2025) | Peak position |
|---|---|
| Argentina Hot 100 (Billboard) | 56 |
| Australia (ARIA) | 9 |
| Brazil Hot 100 (Billboard) | 47 |
| Canada Hot 100 (Billboard) | 9 |
| Czech Republic Singles Digital (ČNS IFPI) | 27 |
| Denmark (Tracklisten) | 17 |
| Finland (Suomen virallinen lista) | 34 |
| France (SNEP) | 56 |
| Germany (GfK) | 57 |
| Global 200 (Billboard) | 7 |
| Greece International (IFPI) | 8 |
| Hong Kong (Billboard) | 20 |
| Iceland (Tónlistinn) | 14 |
| India International (IMI) | 9 |
| Italy (FIMI) | 79 |
| Latvia Streaming (LaIPA) | 11 |
| Lithuania (AGATA) | 31 |
| Luxembourg (Billboard) | 11 |
| Malaysia (Billboard) | 13 |
| Malaysia International (RIM) | 15 |
| Middle East and North Africa (IFPI) | 19 |
| New Zealand (Recorded Music NZ) | 10 |
| Norway (VG-lista) | 18 |
| Philippines (IFPI) | 8 |
| Philippines Hot 100 (Billboard Philippines) | 6 |
| Poland Streaming (OLiS) | 46 |
| Portugal (AFP) | 9 |
| Singapore (RIAS) | 7 |
| Slovakia Singles Digital (ČNS IFPI) | 46 |
| Spain (Promusicae) | 26 |
| Sweden (Sverigetopplistan) | 13 |
| Switzerland Streaming (Schweizer Hitparade) | 10 |
| United Arab Emirates (IFPI) | 8 |
| UK Singles Sales (OCC) | 92 |
| UK Streaming (OCC) | 12 |
| UK Video Streaming (OCC) | 31 |
| US Billboard Hot 100 | 6 |
| US Adult Pop Airplay (Billboard) | 33 |
| US Pop Airplay (Billboard) | 39 |

== Certifications ==
Certifications
| Region | Certification | Certified units/sales |
|---|---|---|
| Australia (ARIA) | Gold | 35,000^{‡} |
| Brazil (Pro-Música Brasil) | Platinum | 40,000^{‡} |
| Canada (Music Canada) | Platinum | 80,000^{‡} |
| New Zealand (RMNZ) | Gold | 15,000^{‡} |
| United Kingdom (BPI) | Silver | 200,000^{‡} |
^{‡} Sales+streaming figures based on certification alone.
