= Honey (Taylor Swift song) =

2025 song by Taylor Swift

Song by Taylor Swift

from the album The Life of a Showgirl
- Released: October 3, 2025
- Studio: MXM; Shellback (Stockholm)
- Genre: Country pop; synth-pop
- Length: 3:01
- Label: Republic
- Songwriters: Taylor Swift; Max Martin; Shellback
- Producers: Taylor Swift; Max Martin; Shellback

Lyric video
- "Honey" on YouTube

"Honey" is a song by the American singer-songwriter Taylor Swift from her twelfth studio album, The Life of a Showgirl (2025). Written and produced by Swift, Max Martin, and Shellback, "Honey" is a country pop and synth-pop ballad with R&B influences, featuring cascading piano notes, stuttering trap and hip-hop beats, and an arrangement of clarinet, banjo, flute, and Wurlitzer electronic piano. Lyrically, the song is about contentment in a romantic partner who is authentic and calls Swift's narrator "honey" out of love, in contrast to her previous experiences with others who called her "honey" out of jealousy or hatred.

Several critics praised the production of "Honey" and likened its sound to the musical styles on Swift's past albums. A few others considered the lyrical message underwhelming. Commercially, the track reached number 13 on the Billboard Global 200 and charted within the top 20 in Australia, Canada, New Zealand, Luxembourg, Singapore, Sweden, Portugal, the Philippines, the United Arab Emirates, and the United States. It was certified platinum in Canada, and gold in Australia and New Zealand.

== Background and release ==
The American singer-songwriter Taylor Swift created her twelfth studio album, The Life of a Showgirl, to reflect on her triumphant state of mind amidst the success of the Eras Tour and her relationship with the football player Travis Kelce in 2024. She recorded the album with the producers Max Martin and Shellback in Sweden during May–August 2024, in between the European stops of the Eras Tour. Swift announced the album during the August 13, 2025, episode of Travis and Jason Kelce's podcast New Heights; "Honey" was revealed as the eleventh track.

"Honey", along with the album, was released on October 3, 2025, through Republic Records. The track charted at number 13 on the Billboard Global 200 and peaked in the top 20 of the singles charts in Australia (12), Canada (12), New Zealand (14), Luxembourg (15), Singapore (16), Sweden (16), Portugal (18), the Philippines (19), and the United Arab Emirates (19). In the United States, all 12 tracks from The Life of the Showgirl debuted in the top 12 on the Billboard Hot 100, with "Honey" at the last spot. The track was certified platinum in Canada, and gold in Australia and New Zealand.

== Music and lyrics ==
"Honey"
"Honey" features a simple arrangement of Wurlitzer electronic piano, clarinet, and flute, over a trap and hip-hop beat

Swift wrote and produced "Honey" with Martin and Shellback. At three minutes and one second long, it is a country pop and synth-pop ballad with R&B elements. Its production incorporates a hip-hop and trap beat, and a simple arrangement of bass, clarinet, banjo, flute, cascading piano notes, and a Wurlitzer electronic piano in the background.

Critics likened the sound of "Honey" to the musical styles of Swift's past albums. Rolling Stone's Maya Georgi opined that there were influences of Speak Now (2010) on the banjo, 1989 (2014) on the hip-hop beat, and Midnights (2022) on the Wurlitzer piano. Meanwhile, The Independent's Roisin O'Connor considered the production of "Honey" a hybrid of Reputation (2017) and Folklore (2020). John Wohlmacher of Beats Per Minute described the track as a pop song rooted in country songwriting.

In the lyrics, Swift's narrator recounts that in the past, when someone else called her "honey" or "sweetheart", it was meant to be pet names with malicious intent and made her feel repulsive. For instance, other women used to call her "sweetheart" out of jealousy because their boyfriends would look at her, and "honey" to dismiss her sense of style, leaving her "[crying] the whole way home". However, when her current lover calls her "honey", it makes her feel safe and content. Several media publications interpreted the lyrics to be influenced by Swift's romance with Kelce.

== Critical reception ==
Several critics praised the production of "Honey". Georgi labeled it a "sultry reclamation" of all of the best musical styles on Swift's previous albums, and Stereogum's Tom Breihan wrote that the track contained "one of the stickiest earworms" on the album. Amanda Petrusich of The New Yorker described the song as "arch, delicate, lovely". In Pitchfork, Anna Gaca deemed it "quite sweet" and considered it a highlight for its extensive use of live instruments, compared to other songs that rely on programmed electronic elements. Writing for The New York Times, Lindsay Zoladz selected "Honey" as one of her two favorite tracks from the album (the other being "Opalite"), and Wesley Morris opined that "the piano waving from across a crowded room" was one of the most pleasurable musical moments.

On a less enthusiastic side, Our Culture Mag's Konstantinos Pappis commended the production as "subtly vibrant", but he argued that the lyrical sentiment "quickly wears thin". Jon Caramanica of The New York Times considered the song the most "saccharine" of the album, but he contended that the message was diluted by the fact that it was more concerned with "cruel people who wielded pet names like weapons" rather than the actual romance. Maria Sherman of the Associated Press categorized "Honey" as a "skip".

== Credits and personnel ==
Credits adapted from the liner notes of The Life of a Showgirl

Studios

- Recorded at Shellback Studios, Stockholm, Sweden
- Produced at MXM Studios and Shellback Studios, Stockholm, Sweden
- Wind instruments recorded and engineered at Studio 112, Jonstorp, Sweden
- Mixed at MixStar Studios, Virginia Beach, Virginia, US

Personnel

- Taylor Swift – vocals, producer
- Max Martin – producer, recording, keyboards, piano
- Shellback – producer, recording, bass guitar, drums, guitar, percussion, tambourine
- Mattias Bylund – horns recording, engineering, Wurlitzer electronic piano, brass arranging
- Lasse Mårtén – horns recording, engineering
- Stefan Brunzell – accordion
- Per-Olof Strandberg – banjo
- Per Strängberg – banjo
- Tomas Jönsson – clarinet, flute
- Stefan Wingefors – double bass, piano
- Peter Noos Johansson – trombone, tuba
- Serban Ghenea – mixing
- Bryce Bordone – assistant mixing

== Charts ==
Weekly chart performance
Chart (2025)	Peak position
Argentina Hot 100 (Billboard)	81
Australia (ARIA)	12
Brazil Hot 100 (Billboard)	70
Canada Hot 100 (Billboard)	12
Czech Republic Singles Digital (ČNS IFPI)	58
Denmark (Tracklisten)	22
France (SNEP)	73
Global 200 (Billboard)	13
Latvia Streaming (LaIPA)	21
Lithuania (AGATA)	64
Luxembourg (Billboard)	15
New Zealand (Recorded Music NZ)	14
Norway (IFPI Norge)	28
Philippines (Philippines Hot 100)	19
Portugal (AFP)	18
Singapore (RIAS)	16
Slovakia Singles Digital (ČNS IFPI)	76
Spain (Promusicae)	50
Sweden (Sverigetopplistan)	16
Switzerland Streaming (Schweizer Hitparade)	14
United Arab Emirates (IFPI)	19
UK Streaming (OCC)	14
US Billboard Hot 100	12

== Certifications ==
Certifications
Region	Certification	Certified units/sales
Australia (ARIA)	Gold	35,000^{‡}
Canada (Music Canada)	Platinum	80,000^{‡}
New Zealand (RMNZ)	Gold	15,000^{‡}
United Kingdom (BPI)	Silver	200,000^{‡}
^{‡} Sales+streaming figures based on certification alone.
