= The Life of a Showgirl =

- Standard edition cover

Studio album by Taylor Swift
- Released: October 3, 2025
- Recorded: 2024
- Studios: MXM; Shellback (Stockholm)
- Genres: Soft pop; soft rock
- Length: 41:40
- Label: Republic
- Producers: Max Martin; Shellback; Taylor Swift

Taylor Swift chronology
The Tortured Poets Department (2024)	The Life of a Showgirl (2025)

Singles from The Life of a Showgirl
- 1. "The Fate of Ophelia" Released: October 3, 2025; 2. "Opalite" Released: January 12, 2026; 3. "Elizabeth Taylor" Released: March 9, 2026

The Life of a Showgirl: The Encore
- Reissue cover

Singles from The Life of a Showgirl: The Encore
- 1. "Patient Zero" Released: September 25, 2026

The Life of a Showgirl is the twelfth studio album by the American singer-songwriter Taylor Swift. It was released on October 3, 2025, through Republic Records, later followed by a reissue subtitled The Encore on September 25, 2026. Swift wrote and produced the album with Max Martin and Shellback, recording it in Sweden during the European leg of the Eras Tour in 2024. Inspired by the tour and her romantic relationship with the American football player Travis Kelce, she conceived The Life of a Showgirl as a vibrant and lively album reflecting her state of mind at the time.

A soft pop and soft rock album, The Life of a Showgirl incorporates retro musical influences, new wave-leaning compositions, and percussive arrangements featuring piano, guitars, strings, synthesizers, and keyboards. Its confessional lyrics explore Swift's experiences with fame and the entertainment industry as well as her contentment in love, incorporating literary references, sexual innuendos, and ironic internet slang terms. The album's title track features guest vocals from the singer Sabrina Carpenter.

Swift introduced The Life of a Showgirl on Kelce's podcast, New Heights, and promoted it with a showgirl-inspired art direction, media appearances, and the film The Official Release Party of a Showgirl, which grossed over $50 million worldwide. Its singles included the US Billboard Hot 100 chart-toppers "The Fate of Ophelia" and "Opalite", and the top-three entry "Elizabeth Taylor". The Encore edition featured the US number-one single "Patient Zero". The album polarized music critics; some praised its production choices and storytelling, while others considered it a regression from Swift's previous works.

The album topped charts and received multi-platinum certifications across the Americas, Europe, and Asia-Pacific. In the United States, it became the fastest-selling album in history, moving over 4 million album-equivalent units in its first week, and spent 15 weeks atop the Billboard 200. The 12 songs from its standard edition simultaneously occupied the top 12 chart positions in Australia, Canada, and the United States, while a record 14 tracks across both editions reached the top 10 of the Billboard Hot 100. It was the global best-selling album of 2025 and received various accolades, including a Premios Odeón, a Japan Gold Disc Award, and a nomination for Album of the Year at the 2027 Grammy Awards.

== Background and development ==
Taylor Swift released her eleventh studio album, The Tortured Poets Department, on April 19, 2024. It spent 17 weeks atop the US Billboard 200 chart and was the global best-selling album of 2024. To promote The Tortured Poets Department, Swift included an extended set list for the European and final North American legs of the Eras Tour, running from May to December 2024. The tour had a large cultural and socioeconomic impact, and became the highest-grossing tour of all time.

Swift wrote and produced her twelfth studio album, The Life of a Showgirl, with Max Martin and Shellback, who previously worked with her on the albums Red (2012), 1989 (2014), and Reputation (2017). The collaboration began after she spoke to Martin during the Stockholm shows of the Eras Tour in May 2024, expressing, "I want to be as proud of it as an album as I am of the Eras Tour, and for the same reasons". She traveled to Sweden during the tour's European leg in the following months to record the album at MXM and Shellback Studios in Stockholm, as well as during Christmas after the end of the tour. Swift mentioned that when she reunited with Martin and Shellback to work on the album, they had all gained more "dexterity" than in the past and "were carrying the same weight as creators".

According to Swift, creating The Life of a Showgirl with "that focus and that kind of discipline" while "keeping the bar really high" was a long-term goal. She opted for a thematically consistent approach, believing that removing or adding any track would change the album. The first song written was "Elizabeth Taylor", whose chorus Swift composed after a "sudden burst of inspiration". "Honey" was among the earliest tracks written and, according to Swift, solidified that she was creatively exploring "new territory". The last track written was "Wish List", which she described as the album's "final piece". Her record label, Republic Records, was unaware of the album until it was finished and promotional materials had been created. Swift conceived the album's reissue, subtitled The Encore, during a trip to Sweden originally intended to celebrate the standard edition's success with Martin and Shellback.

== Composition ==
=== Music ===
"Opalite"
"Opalite" exemplifies the sound of The Life of a Showgirl: its pop and soft rock production incorporates synthesizers and disco beats.

The Life of a Showgirl is a pop album, incorporating soft pop and soft rock with influences of country rock and 1980s disco pop, as well as accents of grunge, reggae, and trap. Elements of country music feature on several tracks; according to Beats Per Minute's John Wohlmacher, the melodies and compositions are rooted in country music traditions. The songs are generally driven by new wave-leaning compositions, percussive arrangements, and propulsive rhythms, characterized by 1970s soft-rock drums or hip-hop beats. The production is upbeat, and the songs generally follow the standard verse–chorus form. The album features live instrumentation and electronic elements, incorporating piano, acoustic and pedal steel guitars, banjos, synthesizers, strings, staccato keyboards, and orchestrations. The Life of a Showgirl features prominent acoustic guitars that, according to the music scholar Alexandra Doyle, recall Swift's early works and help maintain her girl-next-door image.

The songs, generally midtempo pop and soft rock ballads, differ from Swift's past collaborations with Martin and Shellback in their subdued and nuanced arrangements, relaxed pacing, and atmospheric, minimalist production. According to the music analysts Nate Sloan and Charlie Harding, The Life of a Showgirl retains the pop production characteristic of Swift's previous collaborations with Martin and Shellback while incorporating theatrical arrangements reminiscent of music from the Golden Age of Hollywood in the verses and bridges of several tracks. The music theorist Chelsey Hamm argued that the album evokes "musical nostalgia": the tracks allude to past musical genres through combinations of musical parameters such as chord progressions and distinctive vocal and instrumental timbres. Other commentators similarly characterized the sound as retro and described the album as incorporating nostalgic musical references spanning several decades, from the 1950s through the 2000s. Some critics thought that The Life of a Showgirl blended elements from Swift's previous works, mainly Red, 1989, Reputation, Lover, Evermore, and Midnights. (Note: Critics such as Sputnikmusic's staff writer, Hot Press's Tristen Schilling, Clash's Lauren Hague, The A.V. Club's Mary Kate Carr, The Line of Best Fit's Michael Hoffman, Stereogum's Tom Breihan, and The Hollywood Reporter's Nicole Fell) Sputnikmusic's staff writer wrote that it featured vocal nuances akin to Midnights and production styles reminiscent of Reputation. Swift's vocals on The Life of a Showgirl are breathy and multitracked, and the final chorus often ends with an ad-lib vocal.

Swift experimented with genres such as disco in "Wood" and R&B in "Honey"; both songs feature prominent horn arrangements. The album's retro influences are showcased through songs like "Elizabeth Taylor", which features retro strings, and "Opalite", which incorporates a retro swing production. Approximately 40 musicians from the Royal Swedish Orchestra, the Royal Stockholm Philharmonic Orchestra, and the Swedish Radio Symphony Orchestra contributed to The Life of a Showgirl; songs such as "Father Figure", "Cancelled!", and "The Life of a Showgirl" feature string orchestrations performed by Swedish musicians. The three opening tracks—"The Fate of Ophelia", "Elizabeth Taylor", and "Opalite"—showcase bass-led pop arrangements; Tristen Schilling of Hot Press opined that they recalled Swift's singles "Style" (2015) and "I Can Do It with a Broken Heart" (2024). Several songs incorporate memorable pop hooks, demonstrated through the first four tracks. The soft rock-leaning tracks "Ruin the Friendship", "Actually Romantic", and "Cancelled!" are characterized by pulsing basslines and chiming guitars.

=== Lyrics ===
Swift uses the unapologetic, 'frank', and 'funny' showgirl aesthetic to (re)tell the lore of her come-up, of her rise to larger-than-life fame, of the constant attempts to 'cancel' her, and of the things—like love—she almost missed out on because of her cultural identity as a performer.

— Monique McDade, a scholar of literature

Swift described The Life of a Showgirl as being about "what was going on behind the scenes in my inner life during [the Eras Tour], which was so exuberant and electric and vibrant". The frame narrative revolves around her experiences during the tour, including both its successes and difficulties. Using autobiographical songwriting and simplistic storytelling, the album explores Swift's fame and romantic relationship with the football player Travis Kelce. It features themes of loyalty and commitment, and alternates between songs about the entertainment industry and optimistic love songs. "Elizabeth Taylor" intersects the two subjects as a love song framed by the experience of living under public scrutiny. The lyrics depict emotions such as nostalgia, resentment, vindictiveness, and sexual arousal, incorporating literary references, profanity, sexual innuendos, and internet slang terms used for irony and self-deprecation. Joe Muggs from The Arts Desk wrote that the rhymes were "uncharacteristically laboured" and reminiscent of the writing style of the musical-theater writer Stephen Sondheim. According to Sloan and Harding, the songwriting continues the "hyperverbal" style of Midnights and The Tortured Poets Department, featuring wordy choruses and stream-of-consciousness passages dense with catchphrases, metaphors, and turns of phrase.

The Life of a Showgirl presents a showgirl character who must balance her onstage and offstage identities; in "Eldest Daughter", Swift uses showgirl rhetoric to explore the paradox of the showgirl's life while questioning the purpose of the combative nature of the entertainment industry and the cost of adopting a gladiatorial persona in order to navigate it. Other songs similarly address the challenges of the entertainment industry and the negative aspects of fame, including loneliness and scrutiny. The album combines autobiography with theatrical performance through multiple character perspectives, an approach described by Sloan and Harding as "polyphonic auto-fiction". "Father Figure" and "Cancelled!" present narratives from the viewpoints of antagonistic characters, addressing predatory behaviors in the music industry and public perceptions of celebrities. Both songs, along with "Actually Romantic", show Swift's character fiercely determined to uphold her status in the industry. Monique McDade, a scholar of literature, described The Life of a Showgirl as "shocking" for presenting "unsettling glimpses of the life of a showgirl in a 'beautiful', boppy pill."

The romantic songs approach love from several perspectives. Swift portrays love as something meaningful that enhances her life and career in "Elizabeth Taylor" and "Wish List"; explores the playful and joyful side of love in "Wood" and "Honey"; and reflects on her past choices and relationships, and the impact they have had on her life in "Eldest Daughter" and "Ruin the Friendship". The album features an abundance of sexual imagery, particularly in tracks such as "Actually Romantic", "Wood", and "Honey". Some critics wrote that the album recalled Reputation in its exploration of fame and romantic relationships. (Note: As discussed by The Irish Times's Ed Power, Vulture's Craig Jenkins, The New York Times's Jon Caramanica, People's Jeff Nelson, and The Times's Will Hodgkinson) Ed Power of The Irish Times opined that it conveyed a contrasting, brighter perspective to Reputation. Critics also deemed it a "sister" record to The Tortured Poets Department, given their similar portrayals of fame, and thought that it recalled Lover due to its romantic themes and theatrical elements. In the view of Jon Caramanica of The New York Times, the album reflects Swift's weariness with fame and her readiness to abandon it and embrace a new future, although she still could not fully relinquish past wounds and enemies.

=== Songs ===
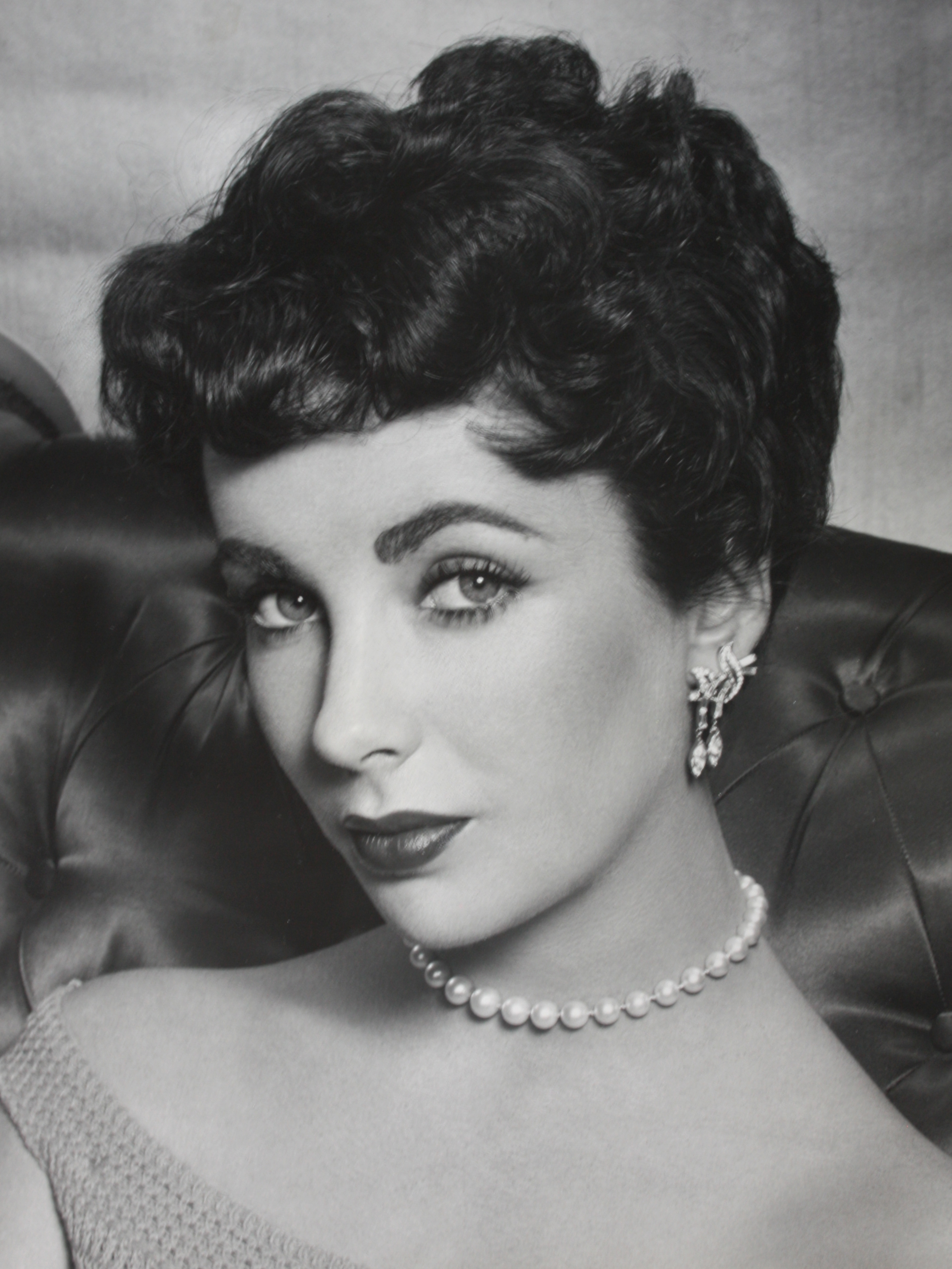
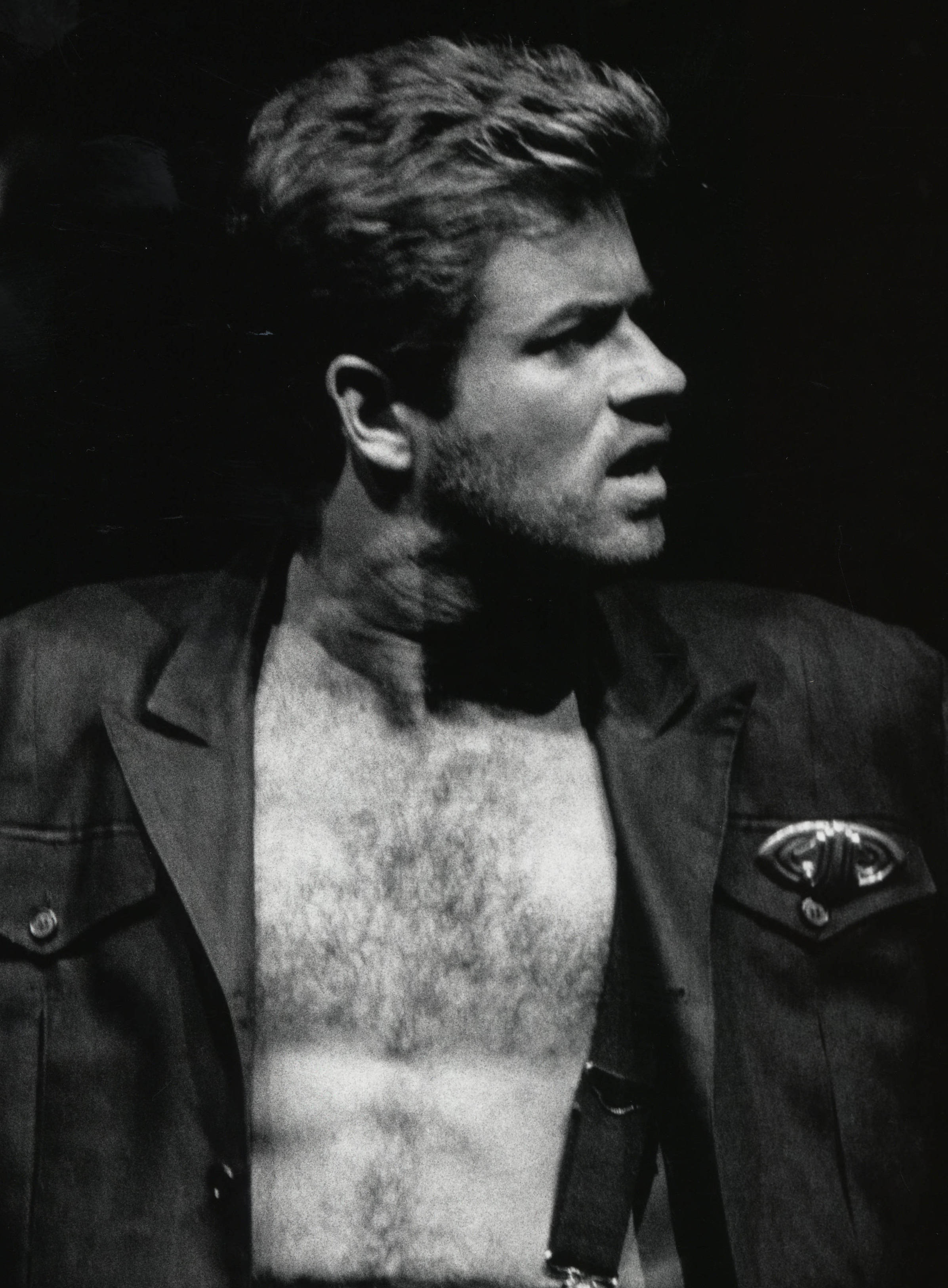
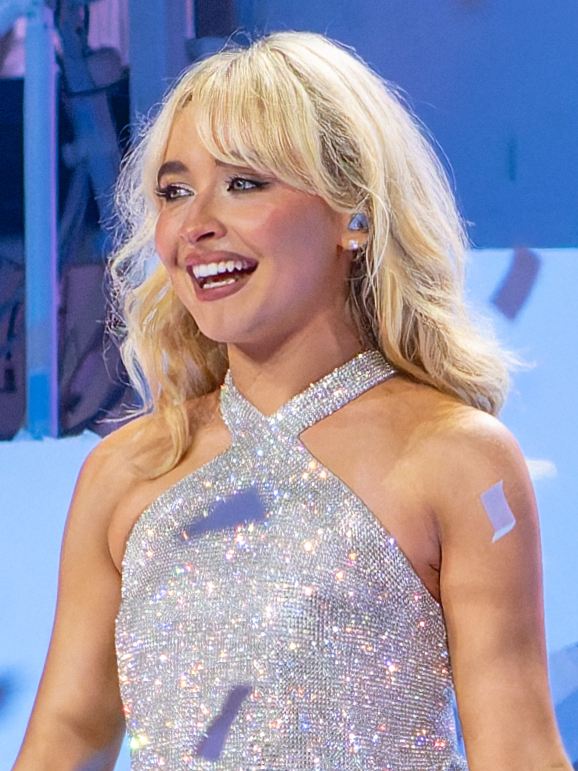
The second track of The Life of a Showgirl is titled after Elizabeth Taylor (left), and the fourth track interpolates "Father Figure" (1987) by George Michael (middle). Sabrina Carpenter (right) is featured on the title track.

The album's standard edition contains 12 tracks and runs for 41 minutes and 40 seconds. The title of the opening track, "The Fate of Ophelia", references the death of Ophelia, a female character from William Shakespeare's play Hamlet who becomes mad due to her lover's actions and drowns. In the lyrics, Swift's narrator pledges loyalty to her lover and credits him for saving her from Ophelia's fate. The dance-pop track features a cascading synth groove and incorporates steel guitars and Omnichords. "Elizabeth Taylor" is titled after the actress Elizabeth Taylor, whom Swift described as "one of the most ultimate, quintessential showgirls". The lyrics find Swift contemplating the nature of romance and fame while drawing parallels between her life and Taylor's as two famous women with highly scrutinized personal lives. The orchestral pop ballad incorporates piano and programmed strings; the chorus is accompanied by a beat drop. "Opalite" is a pop and soft rock song with elements of country, Eurodance, doo-wop, and 1960s rock, featuring synthesizers and disco beats. In the lyrics, Swift expresses her joy of being with the right partner and reflects on both of their past relationships.

"Father Figure" contains an interpolation of the 1987 song "Father Figure" by the singer-songwriter George Michael, who received a songwriting credit as a result. She drew inspiration from the lyric "I'll be your father figure" from his track to write a story about a mentor–protégé relationship and how it can change over time. "Father Figure" is a pop and R&B ballad that features synthesizers, an orchestral treatment, gentle vocal harmonies, and a key change in the final chorus. The lyrics find Swift mocking the men in the industry who previously held power over her. "Eldest Daughter" is a soft rock piano ballad in which Swift sings about the nature of eldest daughters, complemented by satirical lyrics targeting internet culture. "Ruin the Friendship" is a country pop ballad with a jazzy 1970s-inspired production, featuring a soft rock groove and elements of teen pop and 1990s country. In the lyrics, Swift regrets not pursuing a romance with a high school friend before his death.

"Actually Romantic" is a pop-punk track that incorporates drums, electric guitars, and staccato rock guitar riffs. The lyrics find Swift criticizing another artist who gossips behind her back while expressing that she feels flattered by her obsession and finds it sexually arousing. "Wish List" is an electropop power ballad that features chiming synths and elements of 1980s synth-pop. In the lyrics, Swift expresses her desire for a simple, normal life with her partner and willingness to have children; she also reflects on her past relationships and addresses the entertainment industry. "Wood" is a disco and dance track with disco-pop hooks and funk-pop guitar riffs. The song uses double entendres and sexual innuendos to describe superstitious actions that allude to the narrator's sexual satisfaction with her partner.

"The Life of a Showgirl"
"The Life of a Showgirl" is a pop ballad with country influences, featuring synthesizers, banjos, and mandolins.

"Cancelled!" features an atmospheric production of stomping beats, incorporating elements of electropop, pop-punk, and grunge. It includes satirical lyrics targeted at the entertainment industry, misogyny, and cancel culture. "Honey" is an R&B-influenced country pop and synth-pop ballad with a hip-hop and trap beat, and a simple arrangement of bass, banjo, clarinet, flute, and cascading piano notes. In the song, Swift's narrator reflects on her partner's sincerity when he calls her "honey" and other pet names, contrasting her previous negative experiences with such terms and her current relationship. "The Life of a Showgirl" features the singer Sabrina Carpenter, who was one of the opening acts for the Eras Tour. Swift wrote some of the lyrics specifically for Carpenter and wanted her to feature on the track; Carpenter approved immediately and recorded her part while touring in Sweden. A pop ballad with country influences, the song is instrumented with synthesizers, banjos, and mandolins. Lyrically, it is a character study of a showgirl named Kitty, who hails from Las Vegas and goes through the challenges of show business to become a successful showgirl. Its outro features crowd noise recorded at the final Eras Tour concert in Vancouver in December 2024.

The Encore edition includes four additional tracks. "Patient Zero" features subdued, electronica-influenced production incorporating violins, mandolins, country-inspired strings, and muted disco and synth-pop beats. Its lyrics employ medical metaphors to recount a toxic past relationship and depict the narrator consoling someone similarly mistreated by the same man. "Cleveland!" begins with piano notes before transitioning into a jangle pop arrangement incorporating drum rolls and a keyboard melody reminiscent of 1980s synth-pop. In the song, the narrator dismisses criticisms of herself and her relationship as insignificant compared with her partner's affection, while referencing his childhood in Cleveland Heights, Ohio, and their eventual marriage. "Pink Clouding" is a disco, synth-pop, and electropop song featuring pop synths, layered vocals, a steady pulse, and a hi-hat-accented bridge, with lyrics expressing the narrator's regret over mistreating a former partner who supported her during a difficult period. "Babylon" is an acoustic-guitar-backed ballad with a steady beat; its lyrics depict a protagonist who leaves their small-town upbringing for a glamorous but unfulfilling life, symbolized by Babylon, at the expense of a loving relationship.

== Release and promotion ==
=== Artwork and aesthetic ===
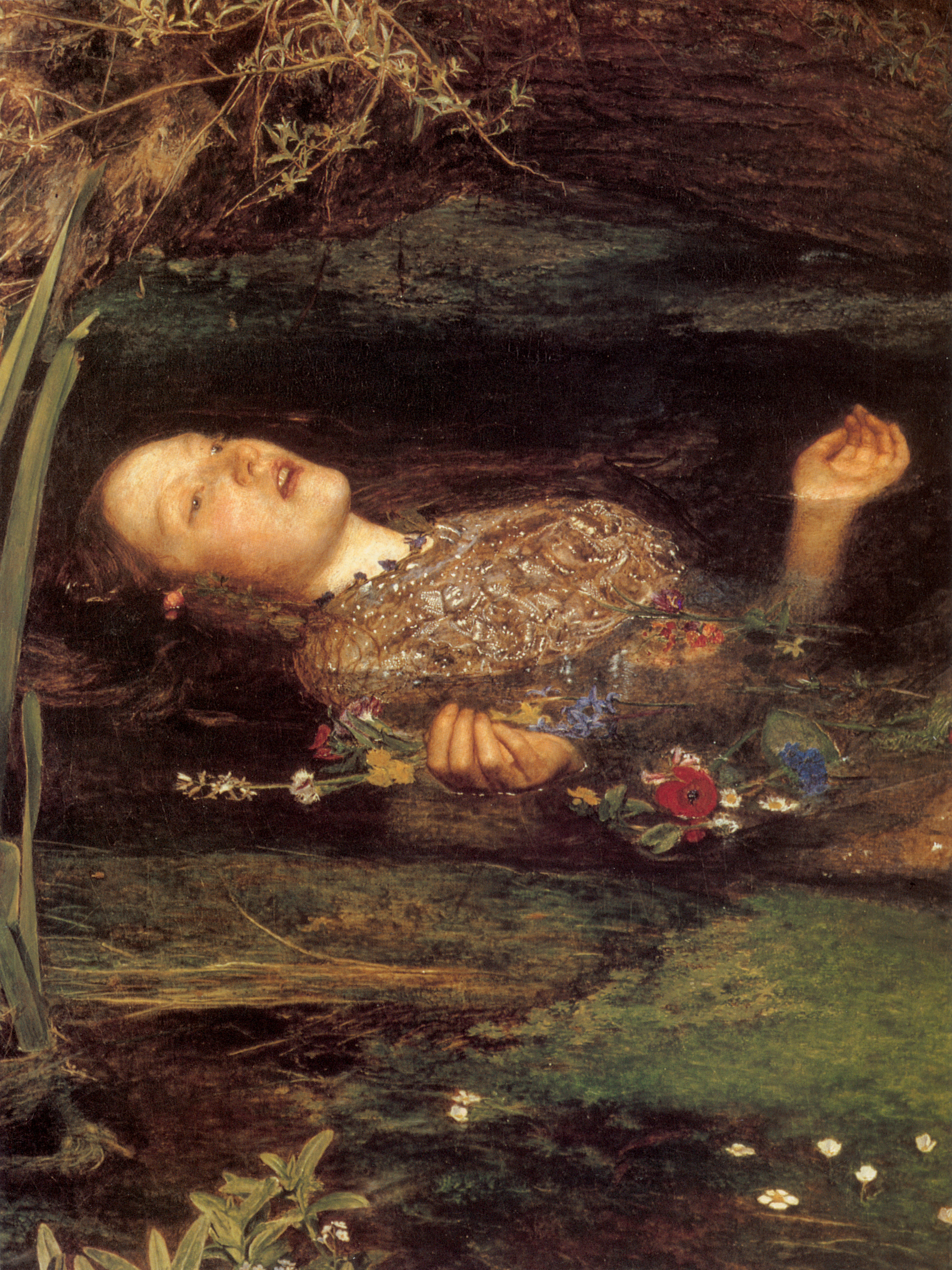
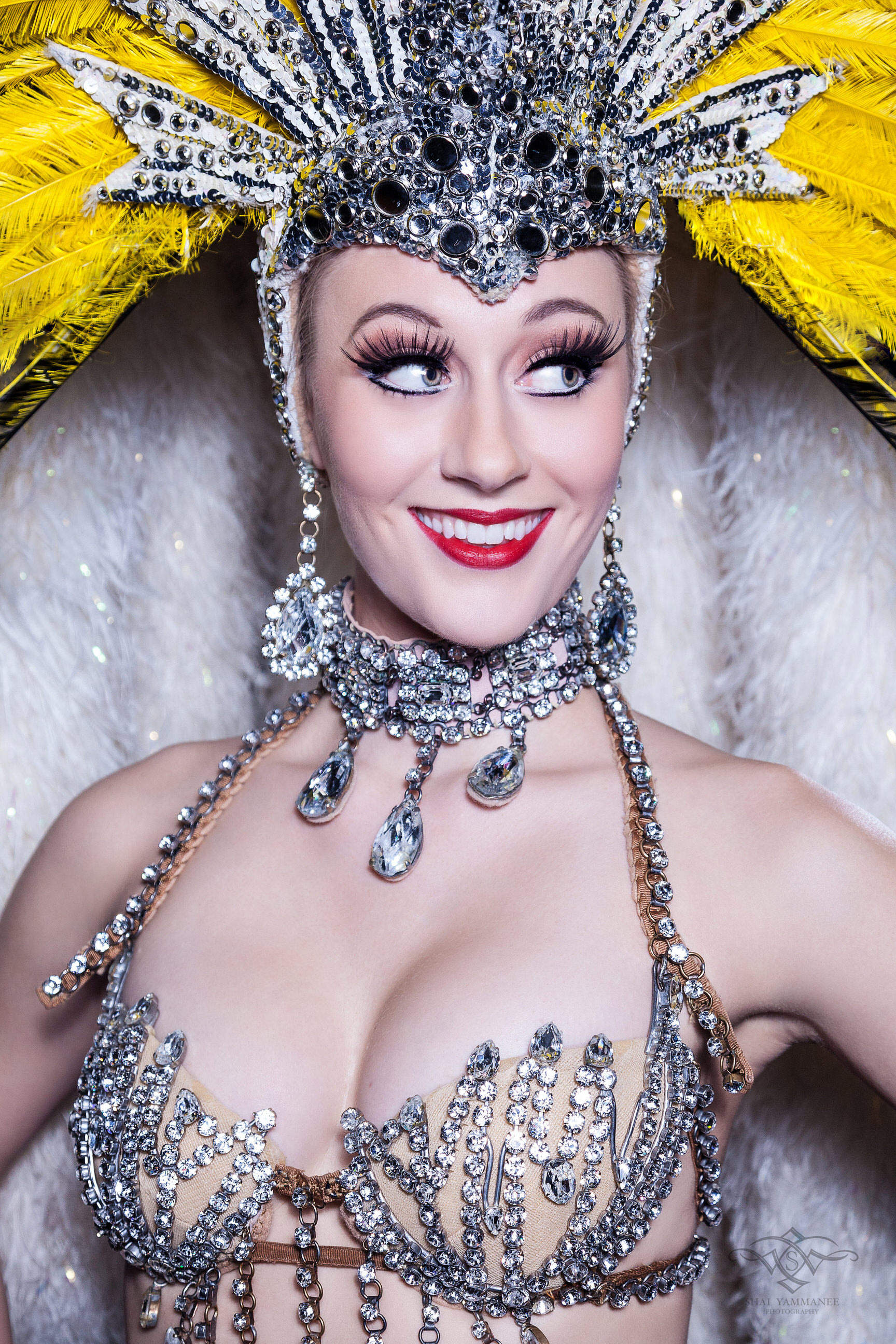
The standard cover references Ophelia (left), an 1850s Hamlet-inspired painting by John Everett Millais. Some of the album's artworks feature Bob Mackie's costumes from Jubilee! (right).

Promotional visuals for The Life of a Showgirl have a glittery, orange-themed color scheme. Its showgirl-inspired photographs were shot by Mert and Marcus, who had previously worked with Swift on Reputation. The standard cover, which references John Everett Millais's early 1850s Hamlet-inspired painting Ophelia, depicts Swift half-submerged in water while wearing a diamond-lined bralette covering her torso. Parts of the cover fragment Swift's body into pieces resembling shattered glass, and the album title is written in orange glitter. The Encore cover depicts Swift standing against a burgundy backdrop in a gold fringed minidress, with the album title written in gold glitter.

Swift stated that the standard cover was intended to glamorize the offstage aspects of the Eras Tour, adding that each show "ends with [her] in a bathtub." McDade interpreted the bathtub reference as a "dark callout" to the pain and coercion imposed on showgirls by the entertainment industry, while Prestige Hong Kong's Surabhi Redkar viewed Swift's direct gaze on the cover as reframing the Ophelia painting, portraying her as resisting rather than succumbing to patriarchal norms. According to the music theorist Drew Nobile, the album's title conveys that "behind the sequins is a real woman."

A rhinestone-encrusted bra-and-thong set worn by Swift for the photoshoot, complete with a headpiece, feathered armbands, and hip accessories, was originally designed by Bob Mackie for the finale of the Las Vegas show Jubilee!. One artwork features Swift in the Jubilee! costume with a yellow headpiece and a choker adorned with three rhinestone pendants, accompanied by dancers from the Eras Tour dressed as showgirls. Journalists characterized the album's aesthetic as depicting the flamboyance and maximalism of showgirls. (Note: Journalists such as Harper's Bazaar's Joel Calfee, Marie Claire's Halie LeSavage, USA Today's Anthony Robledo, and The Times's Olivia Petter) Halie LeSavage of Marie Claire described it as "sensual and sparkling, and the most revealing Swift has ever dressed in the public eye".

=== Marketing ===
On August 11, 2025, the sports podcast New Heights—hosted by Travis Kelce and his brother Jason—posted a thumbnail promoting their next episode, featuring a silhouette of Swift. A countdown with an orange background subsequently appeared on Swift's website; when it ended on August 12 at 12:12 am Eastern Daylight Time (UTC−04:00), the website revealed the album title The Life of a Showgirl, along with pre-order packages for the physical editions. In the New Heights episode that aired on August 13, Swift revealed the cover artwork, track listing, and release date. With over 1.3 million live viewers, the episode set the Guinness World Record for the most concurrent views for a podcast on YouTube. It became the most-watched episode of New Heights on the platform, accumulating over 10 million views in less than 20 hours.

Swift's partnerships with digital platforms included international Spotify billboards showcasing the design of the Eras Tour stage and lyrics from The Life of a Showgirl; pop-up events hosted by Spotify and TikTok featuring sets and installations inspired by the album; a Spotify playlist curated by Swift containing her old songs that Martin and Shellback produced; and orange confetti and a flaming heart emoji when entering her name on Google Search. The Apple Music lyrics pages for some of Swift's earlier songs were altered to capitalize certain letters, revealing lyrics from The Life of a Showgirl. QR codes hidden on orange doors across 12 cities led to now-deleted videos on Swift's YouTube channel. Some fans alleged that the videos were created using generative artificial intelligence and expressed their disapproval.

To further promote The Life of a Showgirl, Swift conceived a promotional film and conducted interviews. The film Taylor Swift: The Official Release Party of a Showgirl had a limited theatrical release in over 50 territories on October 3–5, earning over $50 million. It features the music video for "The Fate of Ophelia", its behind-the-scenes footage, lyric videos of the album's tracks, and Swift's commentary on the songs. Swift appeared on the talk shows The Graham Norton Show (October 3), The Tonight Show Starring Jimmy Fallon (October 6), and Late Night with Seth Meyers (October 8). On October 3, she was interviewed on the radio stations BBC Radio 1, Capital, Heart, Hits Radio, and Magic Radio, as well as on the program Elvis Duran and the Morning Show. Swift had further interviews on Audacy, BBC Radio 2, and SiriusXM Hits 1 on October 6, and on The Roula and Ryan Show with Eric, The Zane Lowe Show, and On Air with Ryan Seacrest on October 7.

=== Distribution and singles ===
The Life of a Showgirl was released on October 3, 2025, through Republic Records; approximately 500 Target stores across the United States remained open for the midnight release to sell physical copies, including an exclusive single-pressing vinyl variant that was promoted through a social media comedy sketch. During its release week, The Life of a Showgirl was available in twenty-seven physical variants—sixteen CDs, eight vinyls, two deluxe CDs with a clothing item, and a cassette—and eleven digital download editions. Swift recorded acoustic versions of some of the album's songs and released them alongside demo recordings across four CDs and five digital download editions. Each vinyl variant included a unique poem written by Swift that, when combined, formed the album's prologue. On digital download services, The Life of a Showgirl was initially made available as a complete album without allowing individual song downloads—a strategy previously employed in the 1990s to encourage full-album purchases. The album's The Encore edition was released to digital music platforms on September 25, 2026.

Three singles from the standard edition were released: "The Fate of Ophelia", released in conjunction with the album, followed by "Opalite" on January 12, 2026, and "Elizabeth Taylor" on March 9, 2026. (Note: References:) On the Billboard Global 200, "The Fate of Ophelia" spent seven weeks at number one, "Opalite" peaked at number two, and "Elizabeth Taylor" reached number three. "The Fate of Ophelia" marked Swift's first number-one single in Austria, Denmark, Germany, Norway, Spain, and the Netherlands, and her longest-running chart-topper in the United Kingdom and the United States. "Opalite" reached number one in Germany, the Philippines, the United Kingdom, and the United States, while "Elizabeth Taylor" peaked at number three in several territories. (Note: Canada, Ireland, Luxembourg, Portugal, the United Kingdom, and the United States) "Patient Zero" was released as a single in conjunction with The Encore, topping the Billboard Global 200 and the national charts of ten countries, including the United States. (Note: Australia, Austria, Canada, Germany, Ireland, New Zealand, Singapore, Switzerland, the United Kingdom, and the United States) The Life of a Showgirl is Swift's first album to produce multiple number-one singles in the United Kingdom and her second to do so in the United States.

== Critical reception ==
=== Standard ===
Professional ratings for The Life of a Showgirl
Aggregate scores
Source	Rating
AnyDecentMusic?	6.0/10
Metacritic	69/100
Review scores
Source	Rating
AllMusic	3.5/5 stars
The Daily Telegraph	3/5 stars
The Guardian	2/5 stars
The Independent	4/5 stars
NME	3/5 stars
The London Standard	1/5 stars
Pitchfork	5.9/10 (Note: Following the release of the album's Encore edition, Pitchfork's Anna Gaca revised the score to 4.9/10.)
PopMatters	9/10
Rolling Stone	5/5 stars
The Times	4/5 stars

Journalists characterized the critical reception of The Life of a Showgirl as mixed (Note: As discussed by HuffPost UK's Daniel Welsh, Reuters's Dawn Chmielewski, The Conversation's Annayah Prosser, The New York Times's Ben Sisario, and the Los Angeles Times's Mikael Wood) or positive. (Note: As discussed by the BBC's Helen Bushby, Ian Youngs, and Steven McIntosh, TheWrap's Alex Welch, Business Insider's Callie Ahlgrim, and Dallas Observer's Eric Diep) According to the review aggregator Metacritic, the album received "generally favorable reviews" based on a weighted average score of 69 out of 100 from 23 critic scores. The review aggregator AnyDecentMusic? assigned it a weighted average score of 6.0 out of 10 from 23 critic scores.

Positive reviews generally commended the production choices (Note: Critics such as Power, Hodgkinson, Breihan, BBC News's Mark Savage, the Associated Press's Maria Sherman, Rolling Stone's Maya Georgi, Variety's Chris Willman, and Billboard's Jason Lipshutz) and Swift's songwriting. (Note: Critics such as Power, Savage, Georgi, Lipshutz, Breihan, and The Australian's Andrew McMillen) The Independent's Roisin O'Connor lauded the sonic experimentation and thematic duality, adding that The Life of a Showgirl demonstrated Swift's prowess as a storyteller. The Australian's Andrew McMillen similarly praised the arrangements as vibrant and wrote that the album exemplified her ability to write "great music while feeling both happy and inspired." Caramanica regarded the production as catchy and restrained and the songwriting as intimate and powerful. Schilling opined that The Life of a Showgirl established its distinct sound despite blending elements from Swift's previous works: "The album's unique pop range displays Swift as an artist determined to live up to her reputation – and succeeding." Ludovic Hunter-Tilney of the Financial Times and Ann Powers of NPR praised Swift's vocals, with the former describing them as "mellifluously conversational".

Some reviewers complimented the production but deemed the album unremarkable. Paste's Ellen Johnson commended the "crisp production and unexpected melodies" but thought that the album was underwhelming and its lyrical quality inconsistent. Michael Hoffman of The Line of Best Fit similarly deemed it catchy and engaging but questioned its purpose. Mary Kate Carr of The A.V. Club praised the "confident and mature" production but considered it less catchy than 1989 and criticized the repetitive themes. India Block of The London Standard found the production refreshing but viewed the songwriting as a regression from Swift's previous records. Vulture's Craig Jenkins commended the "lurid insights" into love and fame but felt that "not everything entirely clicks". Other reviewers likewise contended that the album was less catchy than Swift's previous works and took issue with its songwriting and use of internet slang and sexual innuendos.

Other critics criticized the lyrics (Note: Critics such as Wood, Hague, Consequence's Wren Graves, and The Atlantic's Spencer Kornhaber) and opined that the album generally lacked the emotional depth that had characterized Swift's songwriting. (Note: Critics such as Wood, Kornhaber, and The New Yorker's Amanda Petrusich) Amanda Petrusich of The New Yorker added that it was missing "some essential dynamism" and took issue with Swift's meticulous style and "aesthetic of flawlessness". Wohlmacher and MusicOMH's John Murphy considered the album unfocused and uninventive, while Pitchfork's Anna Gaca and NME's Kristen S. Hé deemed it familiar, predictable, and comfortable territory for Swift. Alexis Petridis of The Guardian and Jonathan Keefe of Slant Magazine considered the songwriting subpar for Swift's artistry and the production dull and unremarkable. Slate's Carl Wilson wrote that The Life of a Showgirl featured repetitive themes and lacked the exuberance and emotional stakes of Swift's previous albums.

=== Year-end lists ===
The Life of a Showgirl appeared on several year-end lists of the best albums of 2025. It was featured in the top 10 by Billboard (9th) and The Daily Telegraph (10th), and in the top 20 by The Times (11th) and Rolling Stone (15th). The album appeared on individual critics' lists by Rob Sheffield for Rolling Stone (3rd), Chris Willman for Variety (4th), and Jon Caramanica for The New York Times (11th), as well as unranked lists by the New Statesman and The Week. PopMatters also named it the year's 25th-best pop album. By contrast, Paste listed it as the third-worst album of 2025 and included three of its songs—"Actually Romantic", "Wood", and "Cancelled!"—among the year's worst songs.

=== The Encore ===
Professional ratings of The Encore
Aggregate scores
Source	Rating
Metacritic	44/100
Review scores
Source	Rating
Business Insider	6.6/10
Consequence	C
The Daily Telegraph	2/5 stars
The Guardian	2/5 stars
The Independent	2/5 stars
The Irish Times	4/5 stars
Paste	D
Pitchfork	4.0/10
Slant Magazine	1.5/5 stars
The Times	4/5 stars

Journalists described the critical reception of The Encore as mixed or negative. Metacritic assigned it a score of 44 out of 100 from nine critics, indicating "mixed or average" reviews.

The new songs drew praise from some critics. The Globe and Mail's Aisling Murphy considered The Encore markedly stronger than the standard edition. Melissa Ruggieri of USA Today commended the songs' melodic compositions and Swift's vocal delivery, and Willman deemed them charming and a "refreshing" conclusion before Swift's next album. The Times's Will Hodgkinson and The Irish Times's Ed Power liked three of the four new songs; the former praised Swift's songwriting for "taking diaristic details and making them palatable for the pop mainstream", while the latter dubbed The Encore a "highlight reel of the past decade of Swift's career". Bustle's Jake Viswanath enjoyed the new songs but felt some critics were taking the release too seriously, "even using scathing criticism as an excuse to tarnish the entire Showgirl album".

Some critics appreciated certain musical qualities but criticized the lyrics. Consequence's Cassidy Sollazzo considered the melodies catchy but deemed the lyrics immature and lacking nuance. Exclaim!'s Alex Hudson similarly criticized the "juvenile" lyrics and lack of "proper" hooks but commended certain instrumentals. Vulture's Craig Jenkins appreciated the effort behind the new songs but considered their sound dated and thought they failed to surpass the standard edition's strongest material, arguing that Swift's songwriting was constrained by the "neatness" of Martin and Shellback's production. More critical reviews deemed the songs dull and lacking in originality or depth. The Guardian's Laura Snapes regarded the additions as detrimental to The Life of a Showgirl's "already flimsy premise", and Clash's Lauren Hague similarly wrote that they failed to strengthen the album as a whole. Willman and O'Connor regarded The Encore as more akin to a standalone extended play than an extension of The Life of a Showgirl; the latter questioned Swift's decision to include them on her "worst-received album".

== Commercial performance ==
The Life of a Showgirl achieved commercial success across all consumption metrics: streaming, physical sales, and digital sales. It topped the charts across the Americas, Europe, and Asia-Pacific, and broke various records on digital music platforms. On Spotify, The Life of a Showgirl became the most pre-saved album of all time and the first album to surpass five million pre-saves. It set records as the most-streamed album in a single day on Amazon Music, the most-streamed album in a single day in 2025 on Spotify and Apple Music, and the fastest-selling album in 2025 on iTunes. According to Luminate Data, the album's tracks accumulated 1.386 billion streams within the first week across over 200 territories, with a record average of 115.5 million streams. Republic Records reported global first-week consumption of 5.5 million album-equivalent units and 1.5 billion streams. The International Federation of the Phonographic Industry recognized The Life of a Showgirl as the global best-selling album of 2025, with 6.05 million pure copies sold; Swift was awarded Global Recording Artist of the Year for a fourth consecutive year.

=== United States ===
In the United States, The Life of a Showgirl sold 2.7 million copies on its release day, instantly becoming the best-selling album of 2025. It accumulated 3.5 million album-equivalent units in five days, surpassing Adele's 25 (2015) for the largest single-week consumption in Billboard 200 history. After one week, The Life of a Showgirl debuted atop the Billboard 200 with 4.002 million album-equivalent units, which included 3,479,500 pure copies and 680.9 million streams, marking the most commercially successful week by an album in Luminate Data history. It became Swift's 15th number-one album on the Billboard 200, breaking a tie with Drake and Jay-Z for the most chart-toppers among solo artists.

The Life of a Showgirl made Swift the first artist to have every song from an album occupy the top spots of the Billboard Hot 100, led by "The Fate of Ophelia". Following the release of The Encore, its number of top-10 songs on the Billboard Hot 100 increased to 14, the most for an album. The standard edition's tracks achieved the 12 biggest streaming weeks for songs released in 2025. The album spent 15 non-consecutive weeks at number one on the Billboard 200, becoming Swift's second-longest-running number-one album after The Tortured Poets Department. It also made her the first artist to spend at least 15 weeks atop the chart with multiple albums. Topping the Billboard 200 year-end chart of 2025, The Life of a Showgirl was the year's most-consumed album across all metrics, selling 3.985 million pure copies and amassing 5.607 million album-equivalent units. The album was certified five-times platinum in November 2025.

=== Other markets ===
The Life of a Showgirl achieved the biggest debut for an international album in multiple countries, including Italy and Sweden. In the United Kingdom, it recorded the largest opening week for an international album in the 21st century with 423,000 chart units and became Swift's 14th number-one album, making her the international artist with the most chart-toppers. It also obtained the most streams in a single week and the highest first-week vinyl sales. The album topped the 2025 year-end chart in the United Kingdom with 642,000 units, which included 147,000 vinyls—the most vinyls sold for an album in a calendar year. In Germany, The Life of a Showgirl became Swift's fourth consecutive number-one album and recorded the highest opening week for an international solo artist. Its songs made her the first artist to claim eight out of the top 10 spots simultaneously. She also became the first international artist to simultaneously debut at number one on both the album and singles charts with The Life of a Showgirl and "The Fate of Ophelia". The album topped Germany's year-end chart of 2025, selling over 225,000 copies.

The album topped the Australian ARIA Albums Chart and made Swift the first artist to have every song from an album occupy the top spots of the ARIA Singles Chart. The Life of a Showgirl achieved the biggest debut in Canada in the streaming era and became Swift's 15th number-one album on the Canadian Albums Chart, tying her with Celine Dion for the most chart-toppers. The album's tracks monopolized the top 12 spots of the Canadian Hot 100. In France, The Life of a Showgirl debuted at number one with 66,700 album-equivalent units, including 52,466 pure copies, marking Swift's largest debut in the country. On year-end charts, the album reached number one in Australia and Austria; number two in Belgium (Flanders), New Zealand, and Switzerland; and number three in the Netherlands. The Life of a Showgirl has been certified quadruple platinum in Canada; triple platinum in New Zealand and Portugal; double platinum in Australia, Denmark, France, Germany, Spain, and the United Kingdom; and platinum in Austria, Italy, Poland, and Switzerland.

== Accolades ==
Awards and nominations
Award	Year (Note: Indicates the year of ceremony. Each year is linked to the article about the awards held that year, wherever possible.)	Category	Result	Ref.
American Music Awards	2026	Album of the Year	Nominated	
American Music Awards	2026	Best Pop Album	Nominated	
ARIA Music Awards	2026	Most Popular International Artist (Note: Despite the category's name, each nominee was nominated alongside their album)	Nominated	
Asian Pop Music Awards	2025	Global Artist Award	Nominated	
Grammy Awards	2027	Album of the Year	Pending	
Humo's Pop Poll	2025	Best International Album	Won	
Hungarian Music Awards	2026	Foreign Classic Pop-Rock Album of the Year	Nominated	
IFPI Awards	2026	Global Album of the Year	Won	
IFPI Awards	2026	Global Sales Album of the Year	Won	
IFPI Awards	2026	Global Vinyl Album of the Year	Won	
iHeartRadio Music Awards	2026	Album of the Year	Won	
iHeartRadio Music Awards	2026	Pop Album of the Year	Won	
Japan Gold Disc Awards	2026	Best 3 Albums (Western)	Won	
Los 40 Music Awards	2026	Best International Album	Nominated	
MTV Video Music Awards	2026	Best Album	Nominated	
NetEase Annual Music Awards	2025	English Album of the Year	Won	
Nickelodeon Kids' Choice Awards	2026	Favorite Album	Nominated	
Premios Odeón	2026	Best International Album	Won	

== Legacy ==
Publications described The Life of a Showgirl as a cultural phenomenon. Following its announcement, buildings such as the Empire State Building and Kansas City Union Station were illuminated in orange, and numerous brands posted glittery-orange memes and parodies across social media. Swift's fans organized release parties and events worldwide upon the album's release. According to a survey by the technology company BambooHR, six percent of salaried workers took paid time off on the release day, while eighteen percent of employees said that the release sparked workplace conversations; the psychotherapist Bryan E. Robinson wrote that it helped bring "levity, joy and hope" into workplaces.

The marketing became a subject of analysis. The academics Stefanus Galang Ardana and Merry Christiana described the corporate response to The Life of a Showgirl as the "Orange Rush", arguing that brands used its orange-and-glitter aesthetic and fan-oriented references to perform "authentic cultural belonging" within Swift's fanbase. Other scholars argued that the album marked a shift in Swift's branding from girl-next-door relatability toward spectacle and extravagance, and that her interviews and watch parties for The Official Release Party of a Showgirl created "intimacy at scale". The economist Misty Heggeness attributed the album's commercial success to its joyful tone, visual and communal marketing, and Swift's close relationship with fans, adding that "Swift is, once again, bringing innovation to the entertainment industry in real time." Time reported that professional Las Vegas showgirls felt that the album captured the dedication, euphoria, intensity, and glamour of their profession.

The Life of a Showgirl was described as both Swift's most polarizing album and the most divisive release of 2025, despite its widespread commercial success and rankings among the year's best albums in several readers' polls. Swift addressed the mixed reception in an interview with Zane Lowe, stating that listeners were entitled to their subjective responses to art. Some journalists wrote that parts of the critical response relied on sexist commentary or bad-faith interpretations of the lyrics. Callie Ahlgrim of Business Insider opined that the album faced "both thoughtful critiques and bad-faith smear campaigns". Chris Molanphy of Slate remarked that while Swift's ubiquity makes her music difficult to "properly judge", the album was also "so maligned by the online hordes", and that response led him to reassess the album from "overrated" to "slightly underrated" after a few months. The cultural theorist Amelia Morris argued that The Life of a Showgirl's emphasis on Swift's desire for a traditional "settled-down" life was co-opted by far-right narratives and used to fuel backlash against the album. In December 2025, an analysis by the behavioral intelligence platform GUDEA found that 35% of the accusations against Swift originated from bot accounts on far-right platforms, which journalists described as a "coordinated attack".

== Track listing ==
All tracks are written by Taylor Swift, Max Martin, and Shellback. George Michael is additionally credited as a writer on "Father Figure", as it contains an interpolation of Michael's "Father Figure" (1987).

Standard edition
No.	Title	Length
1.	"The Fate of Ophelia"	3:46
2.	"Elizabeth Taylor"	3:28
3.	"Opalite"	3:55
4.	"Father Figure"	3:32
5.	"Eldest Daughter"	4:06
6.	"Ruin the Friendship"	3:40
7.	"Actually Romantic"	2:43
8.	"Wish List"	3:27
9.	"Wood"	2:30
10.	"Cancelled!"	3:31
11.	"Honey"	3:01
12.	"The Life of a Showgirl" (featuring Sabrina Carpenter)	4:01
Total length:		41:40

The Encore edition – disc two
No.	Title	Length
1.	"Patient Zero"	3:45
2.	"Cleveland!"	3:26
3.	"Pink Clouding"	3:10
4.	"Babylon"	3:39
Total length:		55:40

=== Notes ===
- "Wish List" is stylized as "Wi$h Li$t".
- "Cancelled!" is stylized in all caps.

== Personnel ==
Credits are adapted from the album's liner notes.

=== Musicians ===
- Taylor Swift – vocals, producer (all tracks); handclaps (track 3)
- Max Martin – producer, keyboards (all tracks); programming (tracks 1–4, 10), piano (tracks 1, 2, 5–7, 9, 11, 12), string arrangement (track 2), handclaps (track 3)
- Shellback – producer, bass guitar, guitar (all tracks); programming (tracks 1–4, 8, 10, 12), drums (tracks 1–4, 6, 9, 12), keyboards (tracks 1, 3–8, 10, 12), Omnichord (tracks 1–4), percussion (tracks 1–4, 6–9, 12), handclaps (track 3), piano (tracks 5, 7), tambourine (tracks 5, 11), banjo (track 6); ganjo, mandocello (track 7)
- David Bukovinszky – cello (tracks 2, 4, 9, 10, 12)
- Helena Stjernstrom – harp (track 2), English horn (tracks 9, 10, 12)
- Mattias Bylund – string arrangements (tracks 2, 9), synth strings (tracks 2, 10, 12), Hammond organ (track 3); Rhodes, vibraphone (track 9); horn arrangements (tracks 9, 11), bassoon (track 10), Wurlitzer electric piano (track 11), upright piano (track 12)
- Erik Arvinder – violin (tracks 2, 4, 9, 12), conductor (track 10)
- Hanna Helgegren – violin (track 2)
- Mattias Johansson – violin (tracks 2, 4, 9, 10, 12)
- Tomas Jonsson – clarinet (tracks 4, 11, 12), flute (tracks 9–12), baritone saxophone (tracks 9, 12), tenor saxophone (track 12)
- Johan Randen – electric guitar (tracks 4, 9, 12)
- Stefan Wingefors – upright bass (tracks 4, 11), clavinet (track 9), piano (track 11)
- Conny Lindgren – violin (tracks 4, 9, 12)
- Daniela Bonfiglioli – violin (tracks 4, 9, 10, 12)
- Fredrik Syberg – violin (tracks 4, 9, 10, 12)
- Lola Torrente – violin (tracks 4, 9, 10, 12)
- Anders Pettersson – pedal steel guitar (tracks 1, 8, 12)
- Andreas Andersson – alto flute, bass clarinet, string arrangement (track 9)
- Wojtek Goral – baritone saxophone (track 9), flute (tracks 9, 12), alto saxophone (track 12)
- Stefan Pettersson – bass guitar (track 9)
- Thomas Hellsten – clavinet (track 9)
- Janne Bjerger – flugelhorn (tracks 9, 10), trumpet (track 12)
- Magnus Johansson – flugelhorn (tracks 9, 10), French horn (track 10), trumpet (track 12)
- Magnus Sjolander – percussion (track 9)
- Miko Rezler – percussion (track 9)
- Peter Noos Johansson – trombone (tracks 9–12), tuba (track 11)
- Antonio Roland – cello (track 10)
- Peter Volpert – cello (track 10)
- Thomas Lundström – cello (track 10)
- Bard Ericson – double bass (track 10)
- Teresia Alm Bylund – oboe (track 10)
- Bylund Strings – strings (track 10)
- Stockholm Studio Orchestra – strings (track 10)
- Christopher Öhman – viola (track 10)
- Erik Holm – viola (track 10)
- James Opie – viola (track 10)
- Vidar Andersson Melilink – violin (track 10)
- Anna Roos Stefansson – violin (track 10)
- Claudia Bonfiglioli – violin (track 10)
- Iskandar Komilov – violin (track 10)
- Janika Gustafsson – violin (track 10)
- Oscar Treitler – violin (track 10)
- Patrik Swedrup – violin (track 10)
- Sofie Sunnerstam – violin (track 10)
- Veronika Vocotna – violin (track 10)
- Yongmin Lee – violin (track 10)
- Stefan Brunzell – accordion (track 11)
- Per Strandberg – banjo (tracks 11, 12); electric guitar, mandolin (track 12)
- Sabrina Carpenter – vocals, featured artist (track 12)

=== Technical ===
- Taylor Swift – packaging creative direction
- Randy Merrill – mastering
- Ryan Smith – vinyl mastering
- Serban Ghenea – mixing
- Bryce Bordone – mixing, engineering
- Lasse Mårtén – recording, engineering
- Max Martin – recording
- Shellback – recording
- Mattias Bylund – recording, engineering (tracks 2, 4, 9–12); digital editing engineering (tracks 4, 10), recording arrangements (tracks 4, 10, 12)
- Stefan Pettersson – digital editing engineering, engineering (track 4)
- Erik Arvinder – engineering, recording (tracks 4, 9, 10, 12)
- Willem Bleeker – engineering, recording (tracks 4, 9, 10, 12)
- Christopher Rowe – additional engineering (tracks 7, 10)
- Mert and Marcus – photography
- Joseph Cassell – wardrobe stylist
- Jemma Muradian – hair stylist
- Lorrie Turk – make-up artist
- Joshua Sage Newman – packaging art direction
- Bethany Newman – packaging art direction
- Parker Foote – packaging design
- Grace Goga – packaging design

=== The Encore ===
Credits are adapted from Tidal.

- Taylor Swift – vocals, producer (all tracks); background vocals (track 2)
- Max Martin – producer, recording (all tracks); programming, keyboards (tracks 1–3); piano (tracks 1, 2, 4); background vocals, glockenspiel (track 2)
- Shellback – producer, programming, recording (all tracks); drums, keyboards (tracks 1–3); background vocals, percussion (track 2); guitar, bass guitar (tracks 2–4); piccolo flute (track 3); piano, mandocello (track 4)
- Fredrik Burstedt – violin (tracks 1, 4)
- Anders Pettersson – pedal steel guitar, mandolin (tracks 1, 4); guitar (track 4)
- Andreas Wiberg – acoustic guitar (track 1)
- Serban Ghenea – mixing (all tracks)
- Bryce Bordone – mixing, engineering (all tracks)
- Lasse Mårtén – recording, engineering (all tracks)
- Randy Merrill – mastering (all tracks)

== Charts ==
=== Weekly charts ===
Weekly chart performance
Chart (2025)	Peak position
Argentine Albums (CAPIF)	1
Australian Albums (ARIA)	1
Austrian Albums (Ö3 Austria)	1
Belgian Albums (Ultratop Flanders)	1
Belgian Albums (Ultratop Wallonia)	1
Canadian Albums (Billboard)	1
Croatian International Albums (HDU)	1
Czech Albums (ČNS IFPI)	1
Danish Albums (Hitlisten)	1
Dutch Albums (Album Top 100)	1
Finnish Albums (Suomen virallinen lista)	1
French Albums (SNEP)	1
German Albums (Offizielle Top 100)	1
German Pop Albums (Offizielle Top 100)	1
Greek Albums (IFPI)	1
Hungarian Albums (MAHASZ)	1
Icelandic Albums (Tónlistinn)	1
Irish Albums (Official Charts)	1
Italian Albums (FIMI)	1
Japanese Albums (Oricon)	16
Japanese Combined Albums (Oricon)	15
Japanese Hot Albums (Billboard Japan)	4
Lithuanian Albums (AGATA)	1
New Zealand Albums (RMNZ)	1
Nigerian Albums (TurnTable)	24
Norwegian Albums (IFPI Norge)	1
Polish Albums (ZPAV)	1
Portuguese Albums (AFP)	1
Scottish Albums (Official Charts)	1
Slovak Albums (ČNS IFPI)	1
Spanish Albums (PROMUSICAE)	1
Swedish Albums (Sverigetopplistan)	1
Swiss Albums (Schweizer Hitparade)	1
UK Albums (Official Charts)	1
US Billboard 200	1

=== Monthly charts ===
Monthly chart performance
Chart (2025)	Position
Japanese Albums (Oricon)	40

=== Year-end charts ===
Year-end chart performance
Chart (2025)	Position
Australian Albums (ARIA)	1
Austrian Albums (Ö3 Austria)	1
Belgian Albums (Ultratop Flanders)	2
Belgian Albums (Ultratop Wallonia)	18
Canadian Albums (Billboard)	9
Danish Albums (Hitlisten)	6
Dutch Albums (Album Top 100)	3
French Albums (SNEP)	21
German Albums (Offizielle Top 100)	1
Global Albums (IFPI)	1
Hungarian Albums (MAHASZ)	20
Icelandic Albums (Tónlistinn)	35
Italian Albums (FIMI)	29
New Zealand Albums (RMNZ)	2
Polish Albums (ZPAV)	12
Japanese Download Albums (Billboard Japan)	57
Spanish Albums (PROMUSICAE)	6
Swedish Albums (Sverigetopplistan)	6
Swiss Albums (Schweizer Hitparade)	2
UK Albums (OCC)	1
US Billboard 200	1

== Certifications and sales ==
Certifications and sales
Region	Certification	Certified units/sales
Australia (ARIA)	2× Platinum	140,000^{‡}
Austria (IFPI Austria)	Platinum	15,000^{‡}
Canada (Music Canada)	4× Platinum	320,000^{‡}
Denmark (IFPI Danmark)	2× Platinum	40,000^{‡}
France (SNEP)	2× Platinum	200,000^{‡}
Germany (BVMI)	2× Platinum	300,000^{‡}
Italy (FIMI)	Platinum	50,000^{‡}
New Zealand (RMNZ)	3× Platinum	45,000^{‡}
Poland (ZPAV)	Platinum	30,000^{‡}
Portugal (AFP)	3× Platinum	21,000^{‡}
Spain (Promusicae)	2× Platinum	80,000^{‡}
Switzerland (IFPI Switzerland)	Platinum	20,000^{‡}
United Kingdom (BPI)	2× Platinum	815,618 (Note: UK sales-equivalent units as of October 2026)
United States (RIAA)	5× Platinum	3,984,648 (Note: US pure sales as of January 2026)
^{‡} Sales+streaming figures based on certification alone.

== Release history ==
List of release dates and formats
Region	Date	Format(s)	Edition(s)	Label	Ref.
Various	October 3, 2025	Digital download; streaming; CD; cassette; vinyl LP	Standard	Republic	
Various	October 3, 2025	Digital download	A Look Behind the Curtain	Republic	
Various	October 3, 2025	Streaming	Track by Track	Republic	
United States	October 4, 2025	CD	Alone in My Tower Acoustic; Dressing Room Rehearsal; Life Is a Song Acoustic; So Glamorous Cabaret (Note: The Alone in My Tower Acoustic Version contains acoustic versions of "The Fate of Ophelia" and "Eldest Daughter"; The Dressing Room Rehearsal Version contains acoustic versions of "Wish List" and "The Life of a Showgirl"; The Life Is a Song Acoustic Version contains acoustic versions of "Opalite" and "Ruin the Friendship"; and The So Glamorous Cabaret Version contains an acoustic version and a demo recording of "Elizabeth Taylor".)	Republic	
Various	October 6, 2025	Digital download	Deluxe Alone in My Tower Acoustic Version (Note: The Deluxe Alone in My Tower Acoustic Version contains acoustic versions of "The Fate of Ophelia" and "Eldest Daughter", and two demo recordings of "The Life of a Showgirl".)	Republic	
Various	October 7, 2025	Digital download	Deluxe Dressing Room Rehearsal Version (Note: The Deluxe Dressing Room Rehearsal Version contains acoustic versions of "Wish List" and "The Life of a Showgirl", and demo recordings of "The Fate of Ophelia" and "Father Figure".)	Republic	
Various	October 8, 2025	Digital download	Deluxe Life Is a Song Acoustic Version (Note: The Deluxe Life Is a Song Acoustic Version contains acoustic versions of "Opalite" and "Ruin the Friendship", and demo recordings of "Honey" and "Cancelled!".)	Republic	
Various	October 9, 2025	Digital download	Deluxe So Glamorous Cabaret Version (Note: The Deluxe So Glamorous Cabaret Version contains an acoustic version of "Elizabeth Taylor", and demo recordings of "Elizabeth Taylor", "Wood", and "Ruin the Friendship".)	Republic	
Various	October 9, 2025	Digital download	Deluxe So Punk on the Internet Version (Note: The Deluxe So Punk on the Internet Version contains demo recordings of "The Life of a Showgirl", "The Fate of Ophelia", "Father Figure", "Honey", "Cancelled!", and "Eldest Daughter".)	Republic	
Various	November 7, 2025	Digital download; streaming	Acoustic Collection (Note: The Acoustic Collection contains acoustic versions of "The Fate of Ophelia", "Eldest Daughter", "Wish List", "The Life of a Showgirl", "Opalite", "Ruin the Friendship", and "Elizabeth Taylor".)	Republic	
Japan	December 12, 2025	CD	Standard	Republic	
Japan	December 12, 2025	CD	Japan Deluxe	Republic	
Japan	December 12, 2025	Vinyl LP	Standard	Republic	
Various	December 19, 2025	Vinyl LP	Standard (Note: Three limited-run vinyl variants were released as part of Swift's holiday merchandise collection.)	Republic	
Various	September 25, 2026	Digital download; streaming	The Encore	Republic	
