= Cancelled! =

2025 song by Taylor Swift

Song by Taylor Swift

from the album The Life of a Showgirl
- Released: October 3, 2025
- Studio: MXM; Shellback (Stockholm)
- Length: 3:31
- Label: Republic
- Songwriters: Taylor Swift; Max Martin; Shellback
- Producers: Taylor Swift; Max Martin; Shellback

Lyric video
- "Cancelled!" on YouTube

"Cancelled!" (stylized in all caps) is a song by the American singer-songwriter Taylor Swift from her twelfth studio album, The Life of a Showgirl. Swift wrote and produced the song with Max Martin and Shellback. The lyrics challenge cancel culture and express solidarity with controversial friends amid public adversity.

== Background ==
The American singer-songwriter Taylor Swift created her twelfth studio album, The Life of a Showgirl, to reflect on her triumphant state of mind amidst the success of the Eras Tour and her relationship with the football player Travis Kelce in 2024. She recorded the album with the producers Max Martin and Shellback in Sweden during May–August 2024, in between the European stops of the Eras Tour. Swift announced the album during the August 13, 2025, episode of Travis and Jason Kelce's podcast New Heights; "Cancelled!" was revealed as the tenth track. The album was released on October 3, 2025, via Republic Records.

The song's title is inspired by cancel culture. Swift said the lyrics are inspired by "when other people go through" after being publicly canceled. Swift herself has been a target of cancel culture and criticism as a celebrity, and she perceived messages of cancel culture as telling her to "kill herself" and having "millions of people hate you very loudly". Swift called "Cancelled!" a "tongue in cheek glimpse at social outrage that everybody goes through now". She described how one can "literally feel canceled by any sort of social backlash" and described that, upon writing the song, she wanted to write about "how one can become wiser" and "become sharper" upon facing social backlash.

== Composition ==
"Cancelled!"
A sample of the first chorus of "Cancelled!".

"Cancelled!" incorporates influences of electropop, pop-punk, and grunge. It is led by a 1990s indie rock guitar intro and incorporates a string section played by Swedish musicians, and conducted by the Swedish violinist Erik Arvinder. Claudio Lancia of the Italian music webzine Ondarock described the track as "the closest thing [on the album] to soft rock".

Several critics opined that "Cancelled!" was similar to Swift's sixth studio album, Reputation (2017), drawing particular comparisons to the similarly themed tracks "Look What You Made Me Do", "I Did Something Bad", "Don't Blame Me", and "Call It What You Want". Entertainment Weekly's Lauren Huff compares the song to "The Man" from Swift's seventh studio album, Lover (2019), while Glamour's Stephanie McNeal compares the song to "But Daddy I Love Him" from Swift's eleventh studio album, The Tortured Poets Department (2024). Beats Per Minute's John Wohlmacher and Prestige's Pallabi Bose felt that the production was "oddly derivative" of Lorde's song "Yellow Flicker Beat" (2014). Lyric-wise, Billboard's Hannah Dailey described inspirations from Candace Owens, and People's Sabrina Weiss described inspirations from Ina Garten. Rolling Stone's Rob Sheffield described that "Cancelled!" quoted from the play Macbeth, particularly the line "Something wicked this way comes".

In early 2025, reports emerged of Swift's relationship with Blake Lively weakening when Swift was subpoenaed during Lively's legal battle with actor Justin Baldoni. Although the subpoena was later dropped, the incident led to media reports suggesting a rift between Swift and Lively. Following the announcement of The Life of a Showgirl's tracklist, fans speculated that "Cancelled!" might be a diss track aimed at Lively. Upon its release, however, the song's lyrics appeared positive about its subject and her tarnished public image, rather than a critique of Lively. Critics have also linked "Cancelled!" with Brittany Mahomes, Selena Gomez, and Sabrina Carpenter.

== Critical reception ==
"Cancelled!" received mixed reviews. Indy100's Sophie Thompson and Caitlin Robson described the song as "shady" and liked the song more than "Look What You Made Me Do" (2017), believing that the track showcased how Swift "has gotten a lot better at standing up and defending herself". Pallabi Bose from Prestige described the song as "crisp, snappy, and very much Reputation coded." Collider's Isabella Soares picked "Cancelled!" as the album's second-best track, deeming it one of Swift's "boldest tracks" with a dark tone and "edgy lyricism", except for the "girlboss too close to the sun" line. Screen Rant's Gina Wurtz described Swift as "wearing cancelation as a badge of honor" and wrote that the song highlighted Swift's "wicked sense of humor". Matthew Dwyer from PopMatters described "Cancelled!" as "an eerie and arresting takedown of the celebrity industrial complex", while Wren Graves of Consequence considered it "foot-stomper with playful lyrics that sound better than they read." Glamour's critics received the song positively, with Chantal Waldholz calling it their favorite from the album and Sam Reed comparing the lyrics to "a bunch of hit tweets". Billboard's Jason Lipshutz described the song as "nicely enacting Swift transforming her wounds into an icy resolve".

Other reviewers took issue with the song's lyrics and narrative, particularly the line "Did you girl-boss too close to the sun?". India Block of The London Standard deemed the song "very fun musically", but criticized the lyrics as "a car crash of outdated millennial cringe". Pitchfork's Anna Gaca called it "a swagless 'Look What You Made Me Do'", while Beats Per Minute's Wohlmacher thought that it lacked the "manic, desperate, drunken energy" of "Don't Blame Me" (2017). The latter deemed the lyrics of the refrain "rather descriptive and strange for the biggest and most beloved pop star of our era". Exclaim!'s Megan Lapierre argued that Swift exaggerated how she was "cancelled" in the past, trivializing real cases and turning it into a shallow, trendy statement. She also wrote that it "sounds like Disney villain music — the ugly stepsister of 'Vigilante Shit'".

== Personnel ==
Credits are adapted from the album liner notes.

Studios

- Produced at MXM Studios and Shellback Studios, Stockholm
- Recorded at Shellback Studios, Stockholm
- Strings recorded and engineered at IMRSV Studios, Stockholm
- Strings and horns engineered and edited at Studio 112, Jonstorp, Sweden
- Mixed at MixStar Studios, Virginia Beach
- Mastered at Sterling Sound, Edgewater, New Jersey

Personnel

- Taylor Swift – lead vocals, songwriting, production
- Max Martin – production, songwriting, programming, keyboards, recording
- Shellback – production, songwriting, programming, bass, guitar, keyboards, recording
- Erik Arvinder – orchestra conductor, recording, engineering
- Anna Roos Stefansson – violin
- Claudia Bonfiglioli – violin
- Daniela Bonfiglioli – violin
- Fredrik Syberg – violin
- Iskander Komilov – violin
- Janika Gustaffson – violin
- Lola Torrente – violin
- Matthias Johansson – violin
- Oscar Treitler – violin
- Patrik Sedrup – violin
- Sofie Sunnerstam – violin
- Veronika Novotna – violin
- Yongnim Lee – violin
- Christopher Öhman – viola
- Erik Holm – viola
- James Opie – viola
- Vidar Andersson Meilink – viola
- David Bukovinsky – cello
- Antonio David – cello
- Peter Volpert – cello
- Tomas Lundström – cello
- Bård Ericson – double bass
- Tomas Jonsson – flute
- Teresia Alm Bylund – oboe
- Peter Noos Johansson – trombone
- Janne Bjerger – flugelhorn
- Magnus Johansson – flugelhorn, French horn
- Helena Stjernstrom – English horn
- Mattias Bylund – string synthesizer, bassoon, orchestra arrangements, engineering, digital editing
- Stockholm Studio Orchestra – strings
- Henrik Langemyr – strings copyist
- Lasse Mårtén – recording, engineering
- Willem Bleeker – recording, engineering
- Christopher Rowe – additional recording
- Serban Ghenea – mixing
- Bryce Bordone – assistant mixing
- Randy Merrill – mastering

== Charts ==
Chart performance
Chart (2025)	Peak position
Argentina Hot 100 (Billboard)	48
Australia (ARIA)	7
Brazil Hot 100 (Billboard)	42
Canada Hot 100 (Billboard)	7
Croatia (Billboard)	23
Czech Republic Singles Digital (ČNS IFPI)	17
Denmark (Tracklisten)	11
Finland (Suomen virallinen lista)	24
France (SNEP)	38
Germany (GfK)	7
Global 200 (Billboard)	9
Greece International (IFPI)	5
Hong Kong (Billboard)	22
Hungary (Single Top 40)	29
Iceland (Tónlistinn)	16
India International (IMI)	7
Italy (FIMI)	63
Latvia Streaming (LaIPA)	7
Lithuania (AGATA)	16
Luxembourg (Billboard)	7
Malaysia (Billboard)	24
Malaysia International (RIM)	19
Middle East and North Africa (IFPI)	17
New Zealand (Recorded Music NZ)	8
Norway (IFPI Norge)	13
Philippines (IFPI)	18
Philippines (Philippines Hot 100)	15
Poland (Polish Streaming Top 100)	33
Portugal (AFP)	8
Singapore (RIAS)	10
Slovakia Singles Digital (ČNS IFPI)	28
Spain (PROMUSICAE)	28
Sweden (Sverigetopplistan)	8
Switzerland Streaming (Schweizer Hitparade)	7
United Arab Emirates (IFPI)	10
UK Streaming (OCC)	9
UK Video Streaming (OCC)	26
US Billboard Hot 100	10
US Adult Pop Airplay (Billboard)	40

== Certifications ==
Certifications
Region	Certification	Certified units/sales
Australia (ARIA)	Gold	35,000^{‡}
Brazil (Pro-Música Brasil)	Platinum	40,000^{‡}
Canada (Music Canada)	Platinum	80,000^{‡}
New Zealand (RMNZ)	Gold	15,000^{‡}
United Kingdom (BPI)	Silver	200,000^{‡}
^{‡} Sales+streaming figures based on certification alone.

== See also ==
- It Ends With Us controversy – widely interpreted by journalists as the inspiration for the song
