= Ruin the Friendship =

2025 song by Taylor Swift

Song by Taylor Swift

from the album The Life of a Showgirl
- Released: October 3, 2025
- Studio: MXM; Shellback (Stockholm)
- Genre: Country pop
- Length: 3:40
- Label: Republic
- Songwriters: Taylor Swift; Max Martin; Shellback
- Producers: Taylor Swift; Max Martin; Shellback

Lyric video
- "Ruin the Friendship" on YouTube

"Ruin the Friendship" is a song by the American singer-songwriter Taylor Swift from her twelfth studio album, The Life of a Showgirl (2025). Swift wrote and produced the track with Max Martin and Shellback. A country pop song with elements of teen pop and 1990s country, it is about Swift's regret over not pursuing a romantic relationship with a high-school friend, referencing her previous songs like "Fifteen" (2008).

Music critics generally praised the emotional songwriting and deemed the production pretty; multiple reviews of the album selected "Ruin the Friendship" as the best track. The Los Angeles Times and Stereogum ranked the track in their lists of the best songs of 2025. "Ruin the Friendship" peaked at number 12 on the Billboard Global 200 and within the top 20 in Australia, Canada, Denmark, New Zealand, the Philippines, Portugal, Singapore, Sweden, and the United States.

== Background and release ==
Taylor Swift created her twelfth studio album, The Life of a Showgirl, to reflect her triumphant state of mind amidst the success of the Eras Tour and her relationship with the American football player Travis Kelce throughout 2024. She announced the album during the August 13, 2025, episode of Travis and Jason Kelce's podcast New Heights; "Ruin the Friendship" was revealed as the album's sixth track.

Swift recorded The Life of a Showgirl in Sweden with the producers Max Martin and Shellback, in-between stops of the Eras Tour. "Ruin the Friendship" along with the album was released on October 3, 2025, via Republic Records. The track peaked at number 12 on the Billboard Global 200 and within the top 20 of the charts in Australia (11), Canada (11), New Zealand (12), the Philippines (12), Sweden (12), Portugal (14), and Denmark (16). All of the album's tracks debuted in the top 12 of the US Billboard Hot 100; "Ruin the Friendship" debuted and peaked at number 11.

== Music and lyrics ==
Swift wrote and produced "Ruin the Friendship" with Martin and Shellback. It is a country-pop song with strong elements of teen pop and 1990s country music, set over a 1980s soft rock groove. The production incorporates subdued synths and an understated hook. Ann Powers of NPR wrote that the bass evokes Motown records, and the overall arrangement is "classic [Max Martin], redolent of everything from New Edition teen pop to '90s country to Swift's own first hits". Mikael Wood of the Los Angeles Times contended that the "laidback" groove evokes the music of Fleetwood Mac, while Tristen Schilling of Hot Press dubbed the production "jazzy 1970s-inspired".

The lyrics of "Ruin the Friendship" narrate Swift's friendship with a high-school classmate, with whom she was in love with but never confessed her feelings, leaving her yearning for a kiss. Towards the end of the song, Swift details her flying back to her hometown after her friend Abigail Anderson broke the news to her that he had died. She concludes the song with her advice that it is better to "ruin the friendship" rather than not taking risks. Anderson is Swift's high-school best friend and the central figure behind her 2008 song "Fifteen". The song's ending setting of a funeral draws parallels with the song "Forever Winter" from her 2021 re-recorded album Red (Taylor's Version). Joel Caffee of Harper's Bazaar commented that the theme of adolescent yearning evokes Swift's early songs like "Hey Stephen" (2008) and "Sparks Fly" (2010).

Swift's fans interpreted "Ruin the Friendship" as a tribute to her childhood friend Jeffrey Lang, who died from a drug overdose in 2010; Lang's mother told The Tennessean that she wished she could contact Swift to thank her for "keeping his name alive". The rapper 50 Cent, who is referenced in the lyrics, "But as the 50 Cеnt song played/ Should've kissed you anyway", congratulated Swift on the album's success on social media.

== Critical reception ==
"Ruin the Friendship" received generally positive reviews from critics for its emotional songwriting and sentiments. Nick Savage of the BBC, Jason Lipshutz of Billboard, and Carly May Gravley of the Dallas Observer deemed it the album's best track. Savage complimented the "heart-wrenching" third verse, Lipshutz wrote that the song "bridges Swift's past and present as a songwriter", highlighting the lyrics that incorporate both storytelling and personal philosophy, and Gravley contended that the track could be a classic. Viewing the song as the album's high point, Dazed's Alim Kheraj and NME's Kristen S. Hé lauded the lyrical details as sharp and acute in depicting grief, introspection, and memory. Alexis Petridis of The Guardian praised it as "authentically heart-tugging" and one of the album's truly memorable cuts. Carl Wilson of Slate and Philippe Renaud of Le Devoir hailed the track as a reminder that Swift could still write beautiful and moving songs, contrary to an otherwise lackluster album.

Other critics also praised the production. Savage highlighted the sound as delicate and soft, and Lipshutz lauded the "fluttering" backing vocals in the "stirring" outro. In The New York Times, Caryn Ganz said that "Ruin the Friendship" immediately captured her attention for its "crisp, lush" soundscape, and Wesley Morris selected the "more-bang-for-your-pluck bass line" as one of the best production choices on the album. The Independent's Roisin O'Connor described it as a "disarming, prettily arranged acoustic throwback". Wood selected "Ruin the Friendship" as one of the better songs on the album and opined that the production was a new direction for Martin and Shellback. In Variety, Chris Willman deemed it one of the prettiest songs Swift had written. The Los Angeles Times named "Ruin the Friendship" the 19th-best track of 2025, while Stereogum featured it at number 36 on their list of the 40 best pop songs of the year.

On a less enthusiastic side, The Daily Telegraph's Poppie Platt described the track as "sweet" but contended the lyrics showcased Swift's limits of still writing about teenage experiences in her thirties. Wren Graves of Consequence dismissed the song as "sad and forgettable".

== Personnel ==
Credits are adapted from the liner notes of The Life of a Showgirl.

Studios

- Produced at MXM Studios and Shellback Studios, Stockholm, Sweden
- Recorded at Shellback Studios, Stockholm, Sweden
- Mixed at MixStar Studios, Virginia Beach, US
- Mastered at Sterling Sound, Edgewater, New Jersey, US

Personnel

- Taylor Swift – lead vocals, songwriting, production
- Max Martin – production, recording, programming, piano, keyboards
- Shellback – production, recording, programming, bass guitar, drums, guitar, percussion, keyboards, banjo guitar
- Lasse Mårtén – recording, engineering
- Serban Ghenea – mixing
- Bryce Bordone – assistant mixing
- Randy Merrill – mastering

== Charts ==
Chart performance
Chart (2025)	Peak position
Argentina Hot 100 (Billboard)	52
Australia (ARIA)	11
Brazil Hot 100 (Billboard)	55
Canada Hot 100 (Billboard)	11
Czech Republic Singles Digital (ČNS IFPI)	34
Denmark (Tracklisten)	16
Finland (Suomen virallinen lista)	42
France (SNEP)	53
Global 200 (Billboard)	12
Greece International (IFPI)	11
India International (IMI)	15
Italy (FIMI)	76
Latvia Streaming (LaIPA)	17
Lithuania (AGATA)	40
Luxembourg (Billboard)	13
New Zealand (Recorded Music NZ)	12
Norway (IFPI Norge)	25
Philippines (IFPI)	15
Philippines (Philippines Hot 100)	12
Poland (Polish Streaming Top 100)	58
Portugal (AFP)	14
Singapore (RIAS)	12
Slovakia Singles Digital (ČNS IFPI)	48
Spain (PROMUSICAE)	37
Sweden (Sverigetopplistan)	12
Switzerland Streaming (Schweizer Hitparade)	13
United Arab Emirates (IFPI)	15
UK Streaming (OCC)	13
US Billboard Hot 100	11

== Certifications ==
Certifications
Region	Certification	Certified units/sales
Australia (ARIA)	Gold	35,000^{‡}
Brazil (Pro-Música Brasil)	Platinum	40,000^{‡}
Canada (Music Canada)	Platinum	80,000^{‡}
New Zealand (RMNZ)	Gold	15,000^{‡}
United Kingdom (BPI)	Silver	200,000^{‡}
^{‡} Sales+streaming figures based on certification alone.
