= Babylon (Taylor Swift song) =

2026 song by Taylor Swift

Song by Taylor Swift

from the album The Life of a Showgirl: The Encore
- Released: September 25, 2026
- Length: 3:39
- Label: Republic
- Songwriters: Taylor Swift; Max Martin; Shellback
- Producers: Taylor Swift; Max Martin; Shellback

Lyric video
- "Babylon" on YouTube

"Babylon" is a song by the American singer-songwriter Taylor Swift from her reissued twelfth studio album, The Life of a Showgirl: The Encore (2026). Swift wrote and produced the song with Max Martin and Shellback, and it was released on September 25, 2026, through Republic Records. It is titled after the ancient city of Babylon. The lyrics follow the story of a person who leaves home to pursue fame, freedom, and a career, and explore the pain of nostalgia and regret over their decision.

"Babylon" received positive reception upon its release. Critics praised the song for its lyrical content and storytelling and compared it to Swift's previous albums. It reached the top ten on the national charts of Australia, Austria, Ireland, New Zealand, the United Kingdom, and the United States.

== Background and release ==
American singer-songwriter Taylor Swift released her twelfth studio album, The Life of a Showgirl, on October 3, 2025. Along with Max Martin and Shellback, the album was conceived amidst the European leg of her sixth concert tour, the Eras Tour (2023–2024), to reflect on her triumphant state of mind and relationship with her then-boyfriend Travis Kelce. The Life of a Showgirl became a commercial success and topped the charts of various countries, including its Billboard Hot 100 entry singles: "The Fate of Ophelia" (2025), "Opalite" (2026), and "Elizabeth Taylor" (2026). To celebrate the album's success, Swift conceived a deluxe edition for the album titled The Encore, featuring four bonus tracks, including "Babylon". The Encore was released on September 25, 2026.

== Composition ==
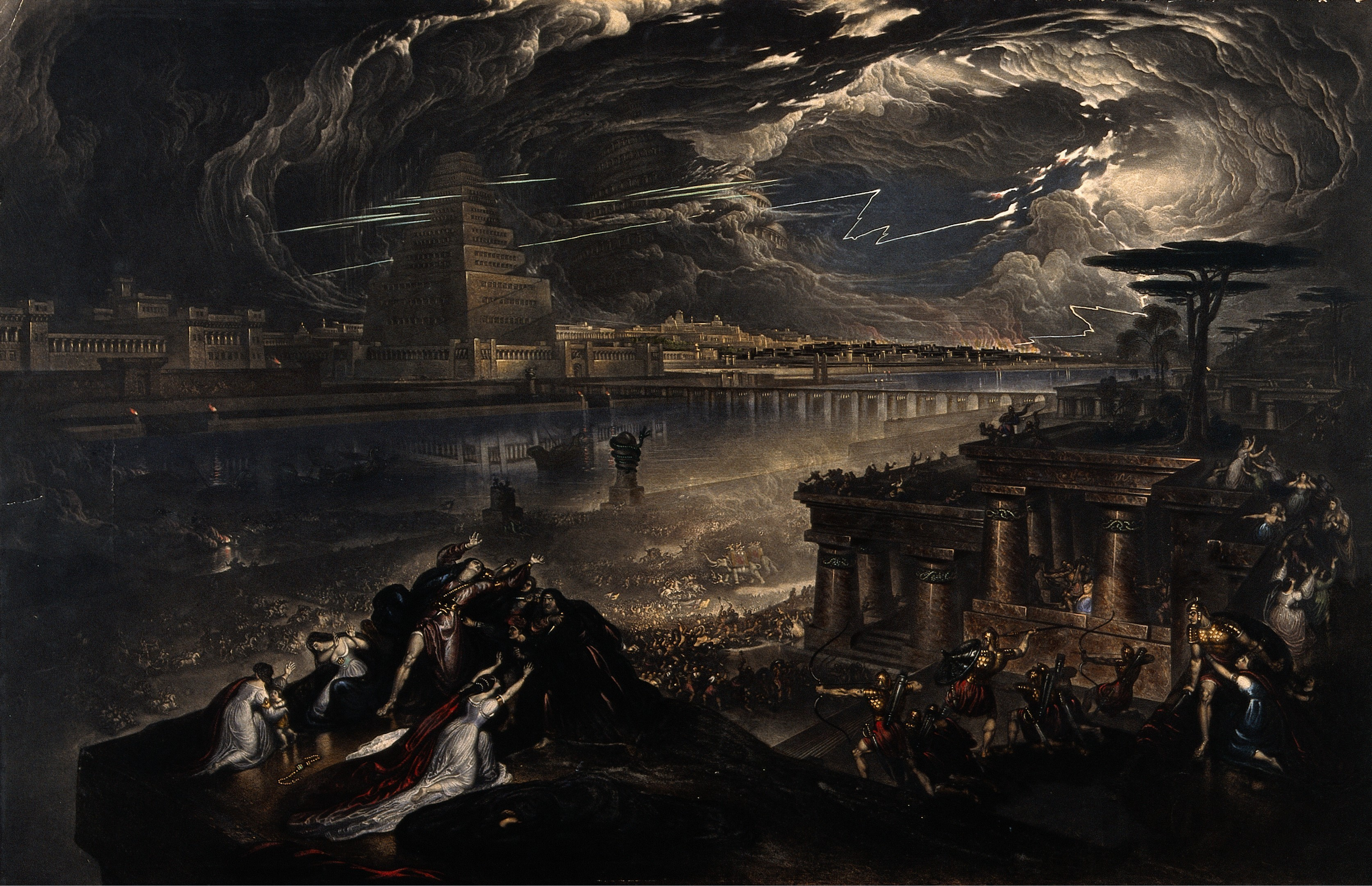
The ancient city of Babylon, the song's namesake

"Babylon" is a ballad. Critics compared the song to Swift's previous albums Speak Now (2010), Red (2012), Folklore, and Evermore (2020), due to its melancholic lyricism and instrumental production.

The song is titled after the ancient biblical city of Babylon, a place that has been previously referenced in Swift's discography, such as in "Cowboy like Me" from her ninth studio album, Evermore (2020), and in her feature on the American singer-songwriter Gracie Abrams's song, "Us" (2024). In the song, Swift explores themes of freedom, nostalgia, and regret, through a second-person narration of the story of a protagonist, who Swift describes as a "liberated libertine" who leaves their hometown in Virginia who wishes to grant their personal ambitions. The protagonist then proceeds to start their newly found independence in life surrounded by casinos, electric fences, and expensive watches. Eventually, they meet a woman who loves and adores them deeply, but the protagonist refuses to make their relationship official, and often mentions that they're single "to the girls at the bar". Once she's gone, the protagonist realizes the cost of what they had, and they had lost. In the bridge, Swift points out that they're "using nostalgia as a weapon" to hurt themself, and describes the consequences of being unappreciative and ungrateful of the present, and choosing to live in the past.

== Critical reception ==
"Babylon" was met with positive reception upon its release. In an article ranking the four deluxe tracks of The Encore, Hannah Dailey of Billboard ranked "Babylon" first, describing it as "the only song on the new set that doesn't play as autobiographical", complimenting its "lush and reverberant" choruses and "instantly memorable melody". Eric Todisco of Page Six wrote that the track is "probably the best of the bunch", but stated that "Babylon" would've better fit in Swift's eighth studio album, Folklore (2020). Similarly, The Independent writer Roisin O'Connor commended that the track is "such an improvement on the other three songs", and Chris Willman of Variety called it "the most lyrically elusive song of the fresh quartet". Slant Magazine's Michael Savio wrote that "Babylon" is a "wistful home-is-where-the-heart-is tale reminiscent" of "'Tis the Damn Season", a track from Swift's ninth studio album, Evermore (2020), praising the song's intricate instrumentation and Swift's vocal performance.

== Personnel ==
Adapted from Tidal

- Taylor Swift – writer, producer
- Max Martin – writer, producer, recording, piano
- Shellback – writer, producer, recording, programming, bass guitar, guitar, mandocello, piano
- Anders Pettersson – mandolin, pedal steel guitar
- Fredrik Burstedt – violin
- Lasse Mårtén – recording
- Serban Ghenea – mixing
- Bryce Bordone – assistant mixing

== Charts ==
Chart performance for "Babylon"
Chart (2026)	Peak Position
Australia (ARIA)	4
Austria (Ö3 Austria Top 40)	7
France (SNEP)	167
Germany (GfK)	16
Ireland (IRMA)	10
New Zealand (Recorded Music NZ)	7
Norway (IFPI Norge)	52
Philippines (Philippines Hot 100)	60
Portugal (AFP)	28
Singapore (RIAS)	12
Sweden (Sverigetopplistan)	32
Switzerland (Schweizer Hitparade)	14
UK Singles (Official Charts)	4
US Billboard Hot 100	4
