= Destination Cleveland =

Tourism agency in Ohio

Destination Cleveland logo

Destination Cleveland (formerly the Convention and Visitors Bureau of Greater Cleveland, Inc., Positively Cleveland and originally the Convention Board of the Cleveland Chamber of Commerce) is the convention and visitor bureau for the Greater Cleveland area. It was incorporated as an independent organization in 1934 and adopted the Positively Cleveland name in 2007.

Destination Cleveland is a non-profit organization that works to bring conventions and tourists to Cleveland, Ohio. Each year, 14.05 million convention and leisure visitors bring $4.53 billion into the local economy. That makes the convention and tourism business one of the largest industries in Cuyahoga County.

Destination Cleveland's offices are located at 334 Euclid Avenue at the corner of E. 4th Street and Euclid in downtown Cleveland. A Visitor Information Center is also housed and operated in the building.

Destination Cleveland is a member organization, promoting more than 600 members from the hospitality industry, including restaurants, transportation, hotels, events, attractions and entertainment.
