= Mattias Bylund =

Swedish musician

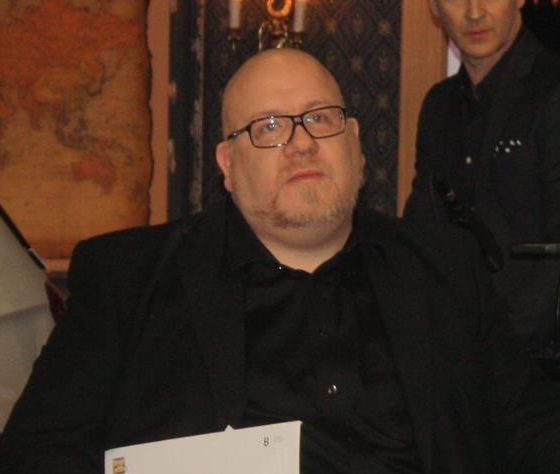

Background information
- Born: Bengt Axel Mattias Bylund; 16 June 1970 (age 55); Södertälje, Stockholms län, Sverige
- Occupation(s): Music producer, musician
- Instrument(s): Synth, piano, horn
- Website: www.mattiasbylund.com

Bengt Axel Mattias Bylund (born 16 June 1970) is a Swedish musician, music arranger and music producer who lives in Gothenburg. In 2016 he received a Grammy Award for string arrangement on Taylor Swift's 1989 and he is also Musical director for Swedish TV-show Bingolotto.

== Biography ==
Bylund grew up in Rönninge where he learned to play the piano by imitating his mother's piano students' homework. In the 1980s moved he and his family to Ultrå in Norrland where he took lessons in bassoon and piano and studied at Mellansels folkhögskola. His first career was as a keyboardist in the bands Masterpiece, Mårtens Hjältar and Perry & the Poorboys in 1980– and the 90s. 1994 Bylund moved to Gothenburg to study to music teacher at the Academy of Music and also became keyboardist for the big band Himlaväsen. In the late 90's Bylund was a music teacher at Samskolan and Musikhögskolan for a few years. One of his students was Johan Carlsson who after his studies started working with Max Martin and started to hire Bylund for recordings.

In 2001, Bylund was musical director for Sven-Ingvars show at Rondo. After that he was hired as MD at the Stadsteatern in Gothenburg, The full Monty (2003) and Kharmen (2006). Since 2006, Mattias Bylund has been the conductor of the annual Christmas concert "Stjarnjul" with Rönninge show chorus & The Entertainmen. He has been the musical director of several of Christer Sjögren's shows since 2007. In 2006, Bylund began to participate sporadically as a musician in Bingolotto and since 2010 is one of the MD:s for the house band in this TV-show. Other TV programs Mattias has been musical director for are Summer Evening with Rickard Olsson (SVT), Eldsjälsgalan och Tack för Dansen (TV4). At the 58th Annual Grammy Awards 2016, he won a Grammy Award in the "Album of the Year" category for strings on Taylor Swift's album 1989. At the Academy Awards 2017 the song "Can't Stop the Feeling!" from the movie Troll was nominated for best original song where Bylund made the horn arrangement.
