= New Heights =

American sports podcast

- Genre: Sports
- Country of origin: United States
- Language: English

Cast and voices
- Hosted by: Jason Kelce; Travis Kelce

Production
- Production: Wave Sports + Entertainment

Publication
- Original release: September 8, 2022 – present
- Updates: Weekly (during NFL season)

Related
- Website: www.newheightshow.com

New Heights (also referred to as New Heights with Jason & Travis Kelce) is a weekly sports podcast hosted by brothers Jason Kelce, former center for the Philadelphia Eagles, and Travis Kelce, tight end for the Kansas City Chiefs. It is produced with Wave Sports + Entertainment. Its name is a nod to the hosts' upbringing in Cleveland Heights, Ohio. In August 2024, the podcast signed a deal with Amazon for more than $100 million.

During the podcast, the brothers discuss sports news headlines and aspects of their personal lives. The podcast also periodically features special guests, including athletes and Hollywood celebrities. Fans of the show are called "92 percenters," a reference to a comment by Jason about the success rate of the quarterback sneak, a football play used when a team needs to gain a few yards to get a first down or score a touchdown. As center, Jason played a key role in the Eagles' success with the play.

== Overview ==
The podcast is recorded remotely, with Jason in Philadelphia and Travis in Kansas City. During the podcast, the Kelce brothers discuss NFL news, pop culture, and sports headlines as well as each other's football games. The show has featured guests including NFL players, celebrities, and members of the Kelce family. The podcast is released in video form on YouTube and audio form on major podcast platforms. The podcast is regularly highlighted on Monday Night Football on ESPN and Sunday Night Football on NBC. According to Billboard in 2025, 58% of New Heights listeners are female.

== History ==
The podcast launched in September 8, 2022. Within weeks of its launch, New Heights was the most-listened-to sports podcast on Spotify and third-most on Apple podcast sports charts. In January 2023, the podcast experienced a rise in popularity when Travis and Jason were set to face off in Super Bowl LVII the following month, which marked the first time two brothers played against each other in a Super Bowl.

The show saw another rise in popularity when Travis began a romantic relationship with singer-songwriter Taylor Swift in 2023. By the end of 2024, the podcast had reached 2.5 million subscribers. On August 13, 2025, Swift announced details of her twelfth studio album The Life of a Showgirl on the podcast. The episode's premiere on YouTube was tuned in by 1.3 million viewers, the most concurrent views for a podcast on the platform according to Guinness World Records, and ended prematurely due to a technical issue before being restored. The Hollywood Reporter reported that the episode had more than 10 million views on YouTube in less than 24 hours, becoming the podcast's most watched episode. According to Spotify, New Heights gained a 3,000 percent increase in new listeners, and the number of female listeners went up by 618 percent.

== Awards and recognitions ==
=== 2022 ===
- "Sports Podcast of the Year" by Sports Illustrated.

=== 2023 ===
- Finalist: Shorty Awards (Sports category).
- List: Apple Podcasts "Best Podcasts of 2023"
- List: Spotify "Best Podcasts of 2023"

=== 2024 ===
- Winner: "Podcast of the Year", iHeartMedia's iHeartPodcast Awards
- Winner: "Best Sports Podcast", The Podcast Academy
- Winner and Audience Honor: Shorty Awards (Sports Podcast category)
- Winner: Best Sports Audio, Sports Business Journal Year-End Awards

=== 2025 ===
- Winner: iHeartPodcast Award, "Best Sports" category
- Winner: Astra Awards, "Best Sports podcast"
- Winner: Sports Podcast Awards, "Best Sports Talk podcast"

=== 2026 ===
- Nominated: iHeartPodcast Award, "Best Sports" category
- Winner: "People's Voice Award" (Sports Shows/Podcasts category), Webby Awards
- Nominated: Best Sports Podcast, Webby Awards
- Nominated: Best Co-Hosts (Features/Podcasts category), Webby Awards
