= Shellback (music producer) =

Swedish record producer and songwriter (born 1985)

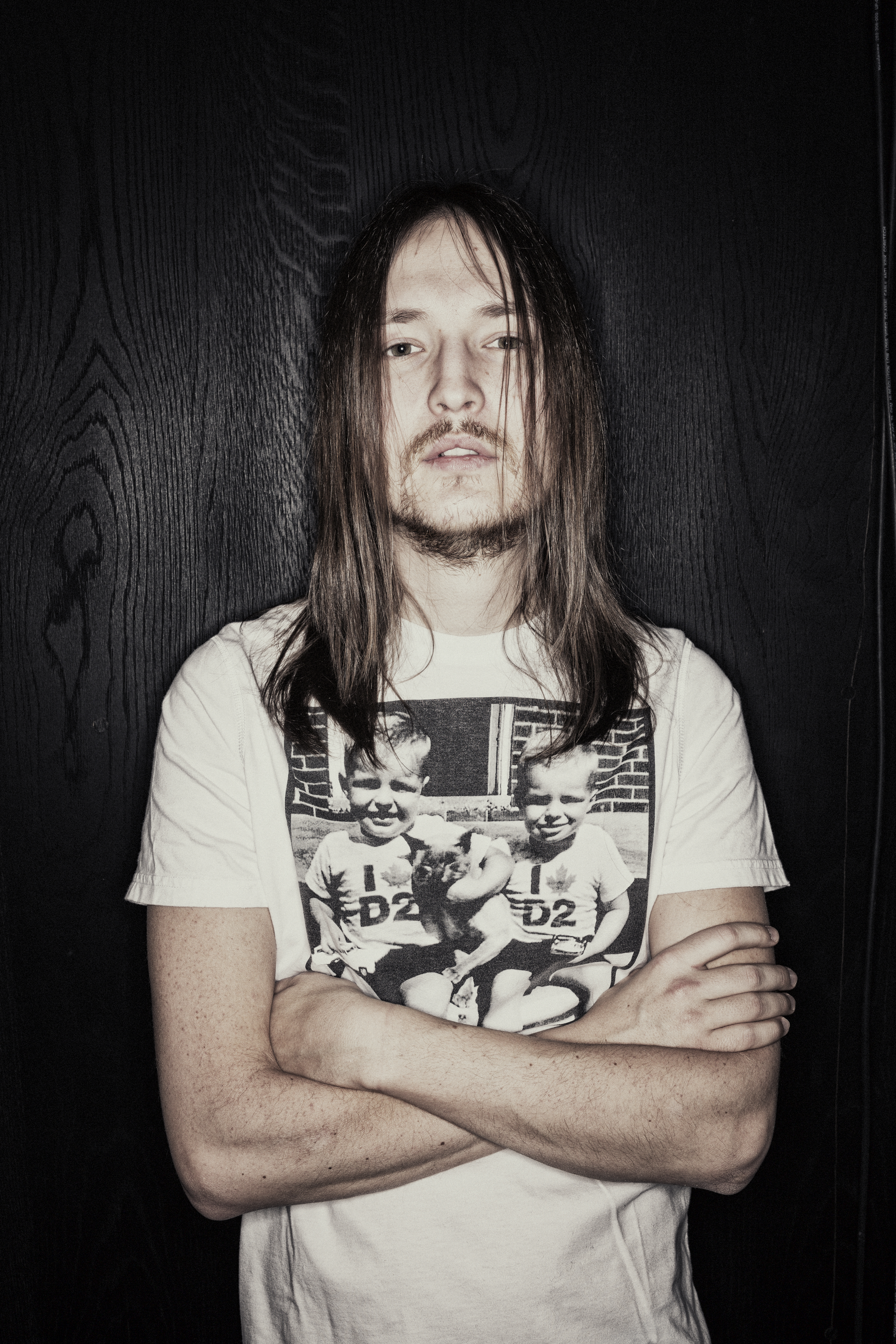
- Shellback in 2015

Background information
- Born: Karl Johan Schuster; 1 February 1985 (age 41); Karlshamn, Blekinge, Sweden
- Genres: Pop; electropop; dance-pop; pop rock; melodic death metal
- Occupations: Record producer; songwriter; musician
- Years active: 2003–present
- Formerly of: Blinded Colony

Karl Johan Schuster (Swedish pronunciation: [ˈjûːan ˈɧʏ̌sːtɛr]; born 1 February 1985), known professionally as Shellback, is a Swedish record producer and songwriter. He was listed as the No. 1 producer of 2012 on Billboard magazine's year end chart, and he also topped the list of their "Top 10 Songwriters Airplay Chart" the same year; he has won four Grammy Awards.

Shellback initially started his career as a heavy metal guitarist before transitioning into pop music production and songwriting.

Shellback regularly collaborates with songwriter Max Martin and together they have produced, written, or co-written songs for various artists such as P!nk, Taylor Swift, Adam Lambert, Britney Spears, Usher, Avril Lavigne, Ariana Grande, Adele and Maroon 5. Shellback has also collaborated with fellow producer Benny Blanco and has produced songs by himself, including "Want U Back" by Cher Lloyd and "Scream" by Usher. He co-wrote and co-produced the song "Can't Stop the Feeling!" along with Martin and Justin Timberlake for the animated film Trolls (2016), earning a nomination for the Academy Award for Best Original Song in 2017.

== Life and career ==
Karl Johan Schuster was born and raised in Karlshamn, Sweden. He started as a drummer in local indie rock bands in Karlshamn, as well as recording all instruments on the 2003 Meriah demo ...Turn Him Your Other Cheek (a strictly black metal recording), before joining the metalcore scene as a vocalist in 2004 for Blinded Colony, with whom he recorded 2005's Promo Demo and 2006's Bedtime Prayers, drawing comparisons to fellow Swedish melodic death metal band In Flames, before leaving in 2007. In 2005, he also performed as a guest musician on the Faith album Sorg.

At the age of 16, Schuster met Max Martin through a mutual friend, Julius Petersson. By that time, according to an interview in the Swedish music magazine Stim-magasinet, Schuster's taste in music was "too cool for school" and he had no interest in pop music whatsoever. Petersson kept sending Schuster's indie rock-death metal demos to Martin, who became curious about what it would sound like if Schuster were to make pop music. So in 2006 Martin invited Schuster to his studio in Stockholm to record a demo with him, and since 2007 Schuster has been signed to Martin's production company Maratone.

Among the first songs Schuster co-wrote with Martin are Pink's 2008 single "So What" and Britney Spears' 2008 single "If U Seek Amy". In 2012 Schuster won the STIM Platinum guitar prize. In 2014, Schuster produced "Problem" alongside Martin and Ilya. In 2015, Shellback collaborated with Swedish hardcore punk band Refused, as he is both a fan of the band's music and friends with the band's drummer, David Sandström. Sandström sent him the versions of the songs "Elektra" and "366" that Refused had recorded with producer Nick Launay, and Shellback replied with his own arrangements of the two songs. Refused frontman Dennis Lyxzen explained in June 2015 that Shellback's versions were "far more Refused than our versions" and "were better" than the Launay-produced versions. The two songs appear on Refused's comeback album Freedom—"Elektra" was released as a single on 27 April 2015—which was released on the label Epitaph Records on 26 June 2015.

== Discography ==
With Meriah

- ...Turn Him Your Other Cheek (Demo) (2003)

With Blinded Colony

- Promo Demo (2005)
- Bedtime Prayers (2006)

As a guest musician

- Faith - Sorg (2005)
- Refused - War Music (2019)

== Production discography ==
Year	Title	Artist and album	Co-writer	Producer or co-producer
2008	"If U Seek Amy"	Britney Spears – Circus	check	
2008	"I'm Gone I'm Going"	Lesley Roy – Unbeautiful	check	
2008	"Boring"	Pink – Funhouse	check	
2008	"It's All Your Fault"	Pink – Funhouse	check	
2008	"So What"	Pink – Funhouse	check	
2009	"Oxygen"	Living Things – Habeas Corpus	check	check
2009	"Bigger"	Backstreet Boys – This Is Us	check	
2009	"3"	Britney Spears – The Singles Collection	check	check
2009	"Quitter"	Carrie Underwood – Play On	check	
2009	"Friday I'll Be Over U"	Allison Iraheta – Just Like You	check	check
2009	"Just Like You"	Allison Iraheta – Just Like You	check	check
2009	"Outta My Head"	Leona Lewis – Echo	check	check
2009	"Naked"	Leona Lewis – Echo	check	check
2009	"Whataya Want from Me"	Adam Lambert – For Your Entertainment	check	check
2009	"If I Had You"	Adam Lambert – For Your Entertainment	check	check
2010	"Kiss n Tell"	Kesha – Animal	check	check
2010	"Hungover"	Kesha – Animal	check	check
2010	"Party at a Rich Dude's House"	Kesha – Animal	check	check
2010	"Dinosaur"	Kesha – Animal	check	check
2010	"DJ Got Us Fallin' in Love"	Usher – Versus	check	check
2010	"Raise Your Glass"	Pink – Greatest Hits... So Far!!!	check	check
2010	"Fuckin' Perfect"	Pink – Greatest Hits... So Far!!!	check	check
2010	"Time Machine"	Robyn – Body Talk	check	check
2011	"Can't Find Entrance"	Those Dancing Days – Daydreams & Nightmares	check	check
2011	"Loser like Me"	Glee cast – Glee: The Music, Volume 5	check	check
2011	"Dancing Crazy"	Miranda Cosgrove – High Maintenance	check	check
2011	"I'll Survive You"	BC Jean – Single	check	check
2011	"Back 2 Life"	E-Type – Single	check	check
2011	"What the Hell"	Avril Lavigne – Goodbye Lullaby	check	check
2011	"Wish You Were Here"	Avril Lavigne – Goodbye Lullaby	check	check
2011	"Smile"	Avril Lavigne – Goodbye Lullaby	check	check
2011	"I Love You"	Avril Lavigne – Goodbye Lullaby	check	check
2011	"I Wanna Go"	Britney Spears – Femme Fatale	check	check
2011	"Criminal"	Britney Spears – Femme Fatale	check	check
2011	"Up n' Down"	Britney Spears – Femme Fatale	check	check
2011	"Light Up the World"	Glee cast – Glee: The Music, Volume 6	check	check
2011	"Moves like Jagger" (feat. Christina Aguilera)	Maroon 5 – Hands All Over	check	check
2011	"Beggin' on Your Knees"	Victorious cast – Victorious	check	check
2011	"No More Secrets"	Carolina Liar – Wild Blessed Freedom	check	check
2011	"Me and You"	Carolina Liar – Wild Blessed Freedom	check	check
2011	"Beautiful People"	Carolina Liar – Wild Blessed Freedom	check	check
2011	"King of Broken Hearts"	Carolina Liar – Wild Blessed Freedom	check	check
2011	"Salvation"	Carolina Liar – Wild Blessed Freedom	check	check
2011	"All That Comes Out of My Mouth"	Carolina Liar – Wild Blessed Freedom	check	check
2011	"Want U Back"	Cher Lloyd – Sticks + Stones	check	check
2011	"With Ur Love"	Cher Lloyd – Sticks + Stones	check	check
2011	"Beautiful People"	Cher Lloyd – Sticks + Stones	check	check
2011	"She Doesn't Mind"	Sean Paul – Tomahawk Technique	check	check
2012	"Payphone" (feat. Wiz Khalifa)	Maroon 5 – Overexposed	check	check
2012	"One More Night"	Maroon 5 – Overexposed	check	check
2012	"Doin' Dirt"	Maroon 5 – Overexposed	check	check
2012	"Scream"	Usher – Looking for Myself	check	check
2012	"We Are Never Ever Getting Back Together"	Taylor Swift – Red	check	check
2012	"I Knew You Were Trouble"	Taylor Swift – Red	check	check
2012	"22"	Taylor Swift – Red	check	check
2012	"Slut Like You"	P!nk – The Truth About Love	check	check
2012	"Your Body"	Christina Aguilera – Lotus	check	check
2012	"Let There Be Love"	Christina Aguilera – Lotus	check	check
2012	"Kiss You"	One Direction – Take Me Home	check	
2012	"Heart Attack"	One Direction – Take Me Home	check	check
2012	"Nobody Compares"	One Direction – Take Me Home	check	check
2012	"All That Matters (The Beautiful Life)"	Kesha – Warrior	check	check
2013	"Release You"	Megan & Liz – Look What You Started	check	check
2013	"Easier To Lie"	Cassadee Pope – Frame by Frame	check	check
2013	"On a Roll"	Icona Pop – This Is... Icona Pop	check	check
2013	"That High" (feat. Kelly Rowland)	Pitbull – Meltdown	check	
2014	"Air Balloon"	Lily Allen – Sheezus	check	check
2014	"I Wish" (feat. T.I.)	Cher Lloyd – Sorry I'm Late	check	check
2014	"Just Be Mine"	Cher Lloyd – Sorry I'm Late	check	check
2014	"Dirty Love"	Cher Lloyd – Sorry I'm Late	check	check
2014	"Blind Your Love"	Cher Lloyd – Sorry I'm Late	check	check
2014	"Killing It"	Cher Lloyd – Sorry I'm Late	check	check
2014	"I'm in Love"	Ola Svensson – Carelessly Yours	check	check
2014	"Tonight I'm Yours"	Ola Svensson – Carelessly Yours	check	check
2014	"Jackie Kennedy"	Ola Svensson – Carelessly Yours	check	check
2014	"Problem" (feat. Iggy Azalea)	Ariana Grande – My Everything		check
2014	"Animals"	Maroon 5 – V	check	check
2014	"In Your Pocket"	Maroon 5 – V	check	check
2014	"Feelings"	Maroon 5 – V	check	check
2014	"Shoot Love"	Maroon 5 – V	check	check
2014	"Blank Space"	Taylor Swift – 1989	check	check
2014	"Style"	Taylor Swift – 1989	check	check
2014	"All You Had to Do Was Stay"	Taylor Swift – 1989		check
2014	"Shake It Off"	Taylor Swift – 1989	check	check
2014	"Bad Blood"	Taylor Swift – 1989	check	check
2014	"Wildest Dreams"	Taylor Swift – 1989	check	check
2014	"How You Get the Girl"	Taylor Swift – 1989	check	check
2014	"Wonderland"	Taylor Swift – 1989	check	check
2014	"New Romantics"	Taylor Swift – 1989	check	check
2014	"Talking Body"	Tove Lo – Queen of the Clouds	check	check
2015	"Bad Blood" (feat. Kendrick Lamar)	Taylor Swift – Non-album single	check	check
2015	"Elektra"	Refused – Freedom	check	check
2015	"366"	Refused – Freedom	check	check
2015	"This Summer's Gonna Hurt like a Motherfucker"	Maroon 5 – V (reissue)	check	check
2015	"The Original High"	Adam Lambert – The Original High	check	check
2015	"Rumors" (feat. Tove Lo)	Adam Lambert – The Original High	check	check
2015	"Evil in the Night"	Adam Lambert – The Original High	check	check
2015	"Run Away with Me"	Carly Rae Jepsen – Emotion	check	check
2015	"Send My Love (To Your New Lover)"	Adele – 25	check	check
2015	"Rest Your Love"	The Vamps – Wake Up	check	check
2016	"Just Like Fire"	Pink – Alice Through the Looking Glass	check	check
2016	"Can't Stop the Feeling!"	Justin Timberlake – Trolls: Original Motion Picture Soundtrack	check	check
2016	"Hair Up"	Justin Timberlake – Trolls: Original Motion Picture Soundtrack	check	check
2016	"Still Falling For You"	Ellie Goulding – Bridget Jones's Baby	check	check
2017	"Bon Appétit" (feat. Migos)	Katy Perry – Witness	check	check
2017	"Roulette"	Katy Perry – Witness	check	check
2017	"Revenge" (feat. Eminem)	Pink – Beautiful Trauma	check	check
2017	"Whatever You Want"	Pink – Beautiful Trauma	check	check
2017	"Secrets"	Pink – Beautiful Trauma	check	check
2017	"...Ready for It?"	Taylor Swift – Reputation	check	check
2017	"Gorgeous"	Taylor Swift – Reputation	check	check
2017	"End Game" (feat. Ed Sheeran & Future)	Taylor Swift – Reputation	check	check
2017	"I Did Something Bad"	Taylor Swift – Reputation	check	check
2017	"Don't Blame Me"	Taylor Swift – Reputation	check	check
2017	"Delicate"	Taylor Swift – Reputation	check	check
2017	"So It Goes..."	Taylor Swift – Reputation	check	check
2017	"King of My Heart"	Taylor Swift – Reputation	check	check
2017	"Dancing with Our Hands Tied"	Taylor Swift – Reputation	check	check
2018	"Get Up and Fight"	Muse – Simulation Theory	check	check
2019	"I Don't Care" (with Justin Bieber)	Ed Sheeran – No.6 Collaborations Project	check	check
2019	''Beautiful People'' (feat. Khalid)	Ed Sheeran – No.6 Collaborations Project	check	check
2019	''Take Me Back to London'' (feat. Stormzy)	Ed Sheeran – No.6 Collaborations Project	check	
2019	''Remember the Name'' (feat. Eminem and 50 Cent)	Ed Sheeran – No.6 Collaborations Project	check	check
2019	''Only Human''	Jonas Brothers – Happiness Begins	check	check
2019	"(Hey Why) Miss You Sometime"	P!nk – Hurts 2B Human	check	check
2019	''Glad He's Gone''	Tove Lo – Sunshine Kitty	check	check
2020	''X''	Jonas Brothers – XV	check	check
2020	"Diamonds"	Sam Smith – Love Goes	check	check
2020	"Call Me Tonight "	Ava Max – Heaven & Hell	check	check
2021	"Wildest Dreams (Taylor's Version)"	Taylor Swift – 1989 (Taylor's Version)	check	check
2021	"I Knew You Were Trouble (Taylor's Version)"	Taylor Swift – Red (Taylor's Version)	check	check
2021	"22 (Taylor's Version)"	Taylor Swift – Red (Taylor's Version)	check	check
2021	"We Are Never Ever Getting Back Together (Taylor's Version)"	Taylor Swift – Red (Taylor's Version)	check	check
2021	"Message in a Bottle"	Taylor Swift – Red (Taylor's Version)	check	check
2021	"Can I Get It"	Adele – 30	check	check
2023	"Eyes Closed"	Ed Sheeran – -	check	check
2023	"Blank Space (Taylor's Version)"	Taylor Swift – 1989 (Taylor's Version)	check	
2023	"Style (Taylor's Version)"	Taylor Swift – 1989 (Taylor's Version)	check	
2023	"Shake It Off (Taylor's Version)"	Taylor Swift – 1989 (Taylor's Version)	check	
2023	"Bad Blood (Taylor's Version)"	Taylor Swift – 1989 (Taylor's Version)	check	
2023	"How You Get the Girl (Taylor's Version)"	Taylor Swift – 1989 (Taylor's Version)	check	
2023	"Wonderland (Taylor's Version)"	Taylor Swift – 1989 (Taylor's Version)	check	
2023	"New Romantics (Taylor's Version)"	Taylor Swift – 1989 (Taylor's Version)	check	
2023	"Bad Blood (Taylor's Version)" (feat. Kendrick Lamar)	Taylor Swift – 1989 (Taylor's Version)	check	
2025	"The Fate of Ophelia"	Taylor Swift – The Life of a Showgirl	check	check
2025	"Elizabeth Taylor"	Taylor Swift – The Life of a Showgirl	check	check
2025	"Opalite"	Taylor Swift – The Life of a Showgirl	check	check
2025	"Father Figure"	Taylor Swift – The Life of a Showgirl	check	check
2025	"Eldest Daughter"	Taylor Swift – The Life of a Showgirl	check	check
2025	"Ruin the Friendship"	Taylor Swift – The Life of a Showgirl	check	check
2025	"Actually Romantic"	Taylor Swift – The Life of a Showgirl	check	check
2025	"Wi$h Li$t"	Taylor Swift – The Life of a Showgirl	check	check
2025	"Wood"	Taylor Swift – The Life of a Showgirl	check	check
2025	"Cancelled!"	Taylor Swift – The Life of a Showgirl	check	check
2025	"Honey"	Taylor Swift – The Life of a Showgirl	check	check
2025	"The Life of a Showgirl" (feat. Sabrina Carpenter)	Taylor Swift – The Life of a Showgirl	check	check

== Awards and nominations ==
Award	Year	Category	Recipient	Original artist(s)	Result	Ref.
Academy Awards	2017	Best Original Song	"Can't Stop the Feeling!"	Justin Timberlake	Nominated	
Golden Globe Awards	2017	Best Original Song	"Can't Stop the Feeling!"	Justin Timberlake	Nominated	
Grammy Awards	2012	Record of the Year	"We Are Never Ever Getting Back Together"	Taylor Swift	Nominated	
Grammy Awards	2013	Album of the Year	Red	Taylor Swift	Nominated	
Grammy Awards	2014	Record of the Year	"Shake It Off"	Taylor Swift	Nominated	
Grammy Awards	2014	Song of the Year	"Shake It Off"	Taylor Swift	Nominated	
Grammy Awards	2015	Album of the Year	1989	Taylor Swift	Won	
Grammy Awards	2015	Best Pop Vocal Album	1989	Taylor Swift	Won	
Grammy Awards	2015	Record of the Year	"Blank Space"	Taylor Swift	Nominated	
Grammy Awards	2015	Song of the Year	"Blank Space"	Taylor Swift	Nominated	
Grammy Awards	2016	Album of the Year	25	Adele	Won	
Grammy Awards	2016	Best Song Written for Visual Media	"Can't Stop the Feeling!"	Justin Timberlake	Won	
Grammy Awards	2016	Best Song Written for Visual Media	"Just Like Fire"	Pink	Nominated	
Grammy Awards	2022	Album of the Year	30	Adele	Nominated	
Grammy Awards	2024	Best Song Written for Visual Media	"Better Place"	NSYNC	Nominated	
Hollywood Music in Media Awards	2016	Best Original Song in an Animated Film	"Can't Stop the Feeling!"	Justin Timberlake	Won	
Hollywood Music in Media Awards	2016	Best Original Song in a Sci-Fi, Fantasy, Horror Film	"Just Like Fire"	Pink	Won	
