= King of My Heart (disambiguation) =

"King of My Heart" is a song by Taylor Swift from her album Reputation (2017).

King of My Heart may also refer to:

- "King of My Heart", a song by Tara Dettman from Sea to Sea: I See the Cross (2005)
- "King of My Heart", a song by Bethel Music from Starlight (2017)
- "King of My Heart", a song by Leeland from Invisible (2016)
- "King of My Heart", a song from the 2007 London revival of Joseph and the Amazing Technicolor Dreamcoat
- "King of My Heart", a song by Melba Moore from Read My Lips (1985)
