= So It Goes... =

2017 song by Taylor Swift

"So It Goes…"

Song by Taylor Swift

from the album Reputation
- Released: November 10, 2017
- Studio: MXM (Los Angeles, California and Stockholm, Sweden)
- Genre: Synth-pop; trap-pop; EDM-pop; power ballad
- Length: 3:52
- Label: Big Machine
- Songwriters: Taylor Swift; Max Martin; Shellback; Oscar Görres
- Producers: Max Martin; Shellback; Oscar Görres

Audio video
- "So It Goes…" on YouTube

"So It Goes…" is a song by the American singer-songwriter Taylor Swift from her sixth studio album, Reputation (2017). Swift wrote the song with the producers Max Martin, Shellback, and Oscar Görres. "So It Goes..." is a power ballad that combines synth-pop, trap, and EDM, over thick synths and heavy beats. Its lyrics depict vulnerability and sexual attraction in a newfound romantic connection, with the narrator surrendering to a greater force to embrace it.

Some critics highlighted the sexual nature of the lyrics to "So It Goes...", while others deemed the song's production insubstantial. Critics have retrospectively considered "So It Goes…" a weaker track in Swift's discography. Swift occasionally performed the track during the acoustic segment of her 2018 Reputation Stadium Tour.

== Writing and composition ==
Taylor Swift and the Swedish producers Max Martin and Shellback wrote various songs for her sixth album Reputation, including "So It Goes…". During a songwriting session in Los Angeles, Swift came across an instrumental track produced by Oscar Görres that Shellback played on his computer. Swift heard the track and told him, "That's special. I haven't done anything like that. Can we do that?" Swift then wrote the lyrics and composed the melody together with Martin and Shellback, and the three had a FaceTime call with Gorres to finalize the song, which became "So It Goes…". Görres recalled that it was a "strange" session for him because he had just gotten out of the shower wrapped in a towel, but he was "very thankful for that". Big Machine Records released Reputation on November 10, 2017; "So It Goes…" is track number 7. The track was recorded at MXM Studios in Stockholm, Sweden and Los Angeles, United States.

At 3 minutes and 52 seconds long, "So It Goes…" is an atmospheric synth-pop, trap-pop, and EDM-pop power ballad. It incorporates thick synths, trap beats and elements of 1990s electronica, resulting in a sound that the music critic Annie Zaleski describes as "chilly". Lyrically, "So It Goes…" is a love song about a newfound romantic connection. The narrator ponders on how it helps her get out of her fixations, but she also has concerns of fear and danger. She feels trapped and powerless against a greater force, and enjoys the sexual chemistry of this relationship, leaving scratches on her lover's back. The narrator confesses that she has fallen deeply in love: "I'm so chill/ But you make me jealous." The title is a reference to a phrase popularized by Kurt Vonnegut's novel Slaughterhouse-Five (1969).

== Reception and live performances ==
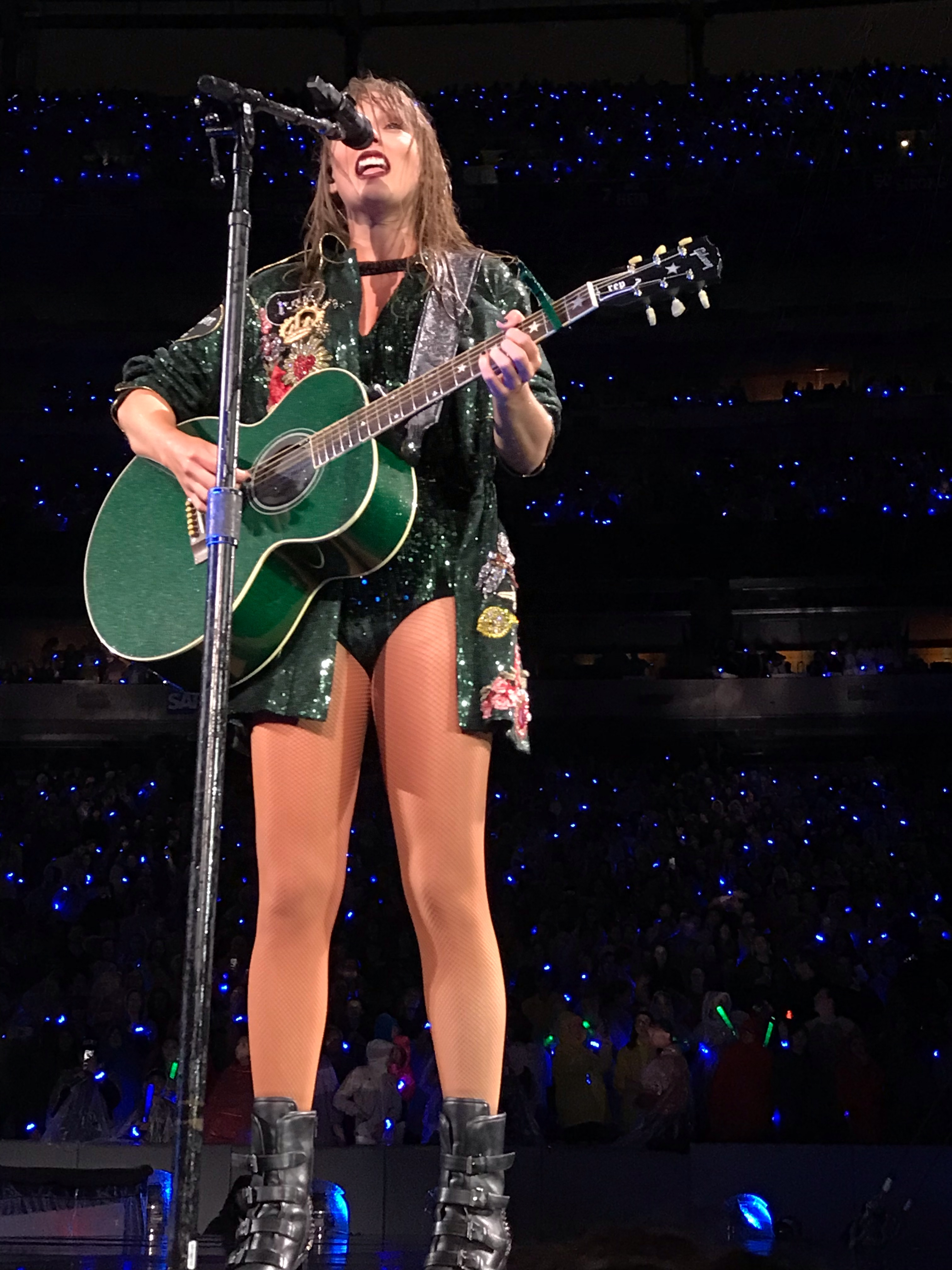
Swift occasionally played "So It Goes..." during the acoustic segment of her 2018 Reputation Stadium Tour.

Reviews of "So It Goes..." generally highlighted its lyrics as showcasing a new side to Swift that is sensual and "edgy". Craig Jenkins of Vulture commended in his review of Reputation that the song "[weighs] the freedom of being single against the irresistible magnetism of a growing attraction". Ashley Iasimone, writing for Billboard, compared the song to "Mirrorball", from Swift's eighth studio album Folklore, further elaborating that both songs "present a sense of illusion, and an overwhelming feeling of being caught up in a moment". Chris Willman of Variety applauded the song as a "lipstick-smearing firebrand", and Rob Harvilla of The Ringer finds the song "awkward and dorky". Geoff Nelson of Consequence and Mikael Wood of Los Angeles Times compared it to Lorde's Melodrama album, and the music by Rihanna, respectively.

Some critics regarded "So It Goes…" as a weaker song in Swift's discography. Chris Richards of The Washington Post posted a negative review of the song, describing it as an attempt to "rap like Travis Scott". Alex Hopper of American Songwriter ranked the song as nine out of ten of the least streamed songs in every Taylor Swift album, further elaborating that it is "not as powerful as [other songs on Reputation]". Jamieson Cox of Pitchfork described "So It Goes..." as "replacement-level trap-pop". George Fenwick of The New Zealand Herald deemed the song insignificant and cringe-worthy. Hannah Mylrea of NME and Lindsay Zolatz of The Ringer considered the track "filler", the former also called it "sleepy". Jane Song of Paste criticized its "lack of catchiness", and Nate Jones of Vulture wrote that the song "comes and goes without making much of an impact". On a more positive note, Zaleski regarded "So It Goes..." as one of the "most underrated" tracks on Reputation.

Swift performed "So It Goes…" on her Reputation Stadium Tour on select dates, both as a surprise song and in place of "Dancing with Our Hands Tied". She performed it again as a "surprise song" as part of the Eras Tour concert on November 20, 2023, in Rio de Janeiro.

== Credits and personnel ==
Credits are adapted from the liner notes of Reputation.

- Taylor Swift – vocals, songwriter, executive producer
- Max Martin – producer, songwriter, keyboards, programming
- Shellback – producer, songwriter, keyboards, programming
- Oscar Görres – producer, songwriter, keyboards, programming, piano
- Michael Ilbert – engineer
- Sam Holland – engineer
- Cory Bice – assistant engineer
- Jeremy Lertola – assistant engineer
- Serban Ghenea – mixing
- John Hanes – mix engineer
- Randy Merrill – mastering

== Certifications ==
Certifications for "So It Goes…"
| Region | Certification | Certified units/sales |
|---|---|---|
| Australia (ARIA) | Platinum | 70,000^{‡} |
| New Zealand (RMNZ) | Gold | 15,000^{‡} |
| United Kingdom (BPI) | Silver | 200,000^{‡} |
^{‡} Sales+streaming figures based on certification alone.
