= Dress (Taylor Swift song) =

2017 song by Taylor Swift

Song by Taylor Swift

from the album Reputation
- Released: November 10, 2017
- Studio: Rough Customer (Brooklyn Heights)
- Genre: Synth-pop
- Length: 3:50
- Label: Big Machine
- Songwriters: Taylor Swift; Jack Antonoff
- Producers: Taylor Swift; Jack Antonoff

Audio video
- "Dress" on YouTube

"Dress" is a song by the American singer-songwriter Taylor Swift from her sixth studio album, Reputation (2017). She wrote and produced the song with Jack Antonoff. A slow jam, "Dress" is a synth-pop track that contains stuttering beats and syncopated phrasings, as well as a synth drop and falsetto vocals in the refrain. The sexual lyrics consist of syncopated phrasings and are about romantic devotion: the narrator tells her lover that she bought a dress only for them to remove it.

Critics generally praised "Dress", describing its lyrics about sexuality as a new aspect of Swift's artistry and image. They complimented the sultry and sensual production and intimate lyricism, and it was considered an album highlight and one of her best tracks by some. Swift included the track in the set list of her Reputation Stadium Tour (2018)—dedicating its choreography to the dancer Loie Fuller—and performed it on some dates of the Eras Tour (2023–2024).

"Dress" reached number 130 on the Billboard Global 200 chart in 2025, following its appearance on the television series The Summer I Turned Pretty. The song received certifications in Australia, New Zealand, and the United Kingdom.

== Background and release ==
Taylor Swift released her fifth studio album, 1989, in October 2014. 1989's synth-pop production transformed Swift's sound and image from country-oriented to mainstream pop. The album was a commercial success, selling over five million copies in the United States within one year, and spawning three Billboard Hot 100 number-one singles. The BBC asserted that the success solidified Swift's status as a global pop star.

Swift was a target of tabloid gossip during the promotion of 1989. Her "America's Sweetheart" reputation, a result of her wholesome and innocent image, was blemished from publicized short-lived relationships and disputes with other celebrities, including a dispute with the rapper Kanye West and the media personality Kim Kardashian. Swift became increasingly reticent on social media, having previously maintained an active presence with a large following, and avoided interactions with the press amidst the tumultuous affairs. She conceived her sixth studio album, Reputation, as an answer to the media commotion surrounding her celebrity. Big Machine Records released Reputation on November 10, 2017; "Dress" is the album's twelfth track.

== Music and lyrics ==
Swift wrote and produced "Dress" with Jack Antonoff, who recorded the track with Laura Sisk at Rough Customer Studio in Brooklyn Heights, New York. Antonoff programmed all the instruments, and Serban Ghenea mixed the track at MixStar Studios in Virginia Beach, Virginia. As with much of Reputation, "Dress" is synth-pop with urban elements of hip hop and R&B. Stuttering beats and syncopated phrasings are included on the song. Andrew Unterberger from Billboard described it as a slow jam and said its production styles evoked the music of the singer FKA Twigs, while Evan Sawdey from PopMatters deemed it an imitation of FKA Twigs's "Two Weeks" (2014). NPR critic Ann Powers wrote that the rhythms of "Dress" evoked the beat of R. Kelly's 2002 song "Ignition (Remix)". According to The New York Times critic Jon Caramanica, "Dress" is one of the Reputation tracks that embrace "soft-core pop-R&B" with a "synth-thick production that moves at a sensual gallop".

"Dress"
"Dress" incorporates a synth drop before the refrain, and the production features stuttering beats and falsetto vocals.

The pre-chorus, "My hands are shaking from all this", ends with Swift panting, before she sings with falsetto vocals in the refrain, which is accompanied by a synth drop: "Say my name and everything just stops/ I don't want you like a best friend/ I only bought this dress so you could take it off". Chris Willman from Variety thought the falsetto evoked the vocal stylings of the singer Prince, and Carl Wilson from Slate named Prince's "If I Was Your Girlfriend" (1987) as a reference point. Caramanica characterized Swift's falsetto as "blushing exhales" that recalled the styles of the music duo AlunaGeorge. The sensual lyrics of "Dress" are about emotional intimacy, with sexual imagery such as spilling wine in the bathtub, hands shaking from anticipation, and wanting one's lover to carve their name onto the bedpost.

Swift considered the lyric, "I only brought this dress so you could take it off", as the song's hook. She said that she was particularly proud of that hook because while it sounded like a pick-up line, it stood for "deep and tender feelings". Critics analyzed how the sexual lyrics developed Swift's image. GQ's Ira Madison III felt that the sexuality and emotional frankness in "Dress" was an appropriate move for Swift, whose romantic relationships had been presented "entirely unsexed, devoid of any real emotion" in the press. Powers remarked that the song's hook represented Swift's newfound relaxed attitude towards sex, adding that while she had previously been conservative about sex in her music and image, the embrace of sexuality helped her cross a "self-imposed line". Unterberger commented that the frank sexual act of taking the dress off was a gradual culmination of Swift's sexual explorations, which she had been subtle about in her past albums. He also thought that the way that she repeatedly sang "take it off" signified her artistic and personal evolution.

== Critical reception ==
When "Dress" was first released, critics and fans were fascinated by the lyrics, particularly the hook, "Only bought this dress so you could take it off." Powers said that the lyrics showed Swift singing about sex while sounding "freer and more truly happy than ever before". In a scholarly analysis with regards to Swift's public image, the gender studies academic Adriane Brown wrote that "Dress" is where Swift explores her sexuality more explicitly than any of her previous songs. Brown contended that it was Swift's move to distance herself from the sex-negative "good girl" persona on her past songs, such as "Fifteen" (2008) or "Better than Revenge" (2010).

Sawdey said that the track exhibited "a nervousness and yearning we haven't seen from [Swift] before", deeming the themes compelling. Kitty Empire of The Observer deemed "Dress" one of the album's "masterclasses" that showcased Swift's "passion". Madison commented that the song found Swift at her "perhaps [...] most sexually explicit" and complimented it for showcasing a mature development from her past songs about adolescent lover, which made her more relatable. Wilson picked it as a "sensual highlight" that represented Reputation's themes of sexuality that marked an artistic and personal growth for Swift. In AllMusic, Stephen Thomas Erlewine picked "Dress" as one of the album's standouts for showcasing a "blend of vulnerability, melody, and confidence" that is "deeply felt and complex".

Other critics also praised the production. Unterberger highlighted the third refrain where the instrumental stops after Swift sings, "Say my name and everything just stops", before resuming again "taking an entire beat of silence". He opined that this trick made Swift "a great pop songwriter" because by saving it for the third refrain, after "three minutes of continuous humming synths, the silence hits infinitely harder than any further drop ever could". Sal Cinquemani of Slant Magazine hailed the track as a "reminder that Swift is capable of making pop perfection seem effortless", Jamieson Cox of Pitchfork dubbed the song a "panting, shuddering highlight" that saw Swift singing "with palpable confidence and ease", and Meskin Fekadu of the Associated Press called it a "winning song" for showcasing a "sensual" side of Swift. In The Line of Best Fit, Eleanor Graham lauded the "effortless" hook and the "impossible effervescence of the chorus", deeming "Dress" the only Reputation track that "sounds like [Swift's] future".

Retrospective reviews have remained generally positive. In Vulture, Nate Jones described "Dress" as a "slinky" track that offered "an unexpected payoff for years of lyrics about party dresses", citing the lyric, "I only bought this dress so you could take it off", which represented a newfound confidence to express her sexuality. Rob Sheffield of Rolling Stone said the song featured "the ache in [Swift's] voice, the yearning in those synth sparkles" and compared the way Swift "interrupts her own wordplay with forlorn sighs" to Prince's "Little Red Corvette" (1983). Laura Snapes of The Guardian deemed "Dress" a "gasping" track and Swift's "first actually sexy song", ranking it among her best works. In Esquire, Lauren Kranc wrote that "Dress" was one of Reputation's best tracks and Swift's "underrated classics" for showcasing "perfect pop song formula and raw, head-over-heels vulnerability". The A.V. Club's Mary Kate Carr selected "Dress" among the 22 "underrated Taylor Swift songs" and described it as "the perfect marriage of Swift's romanticism and newfound lust".

== Live performances and usage in media ==
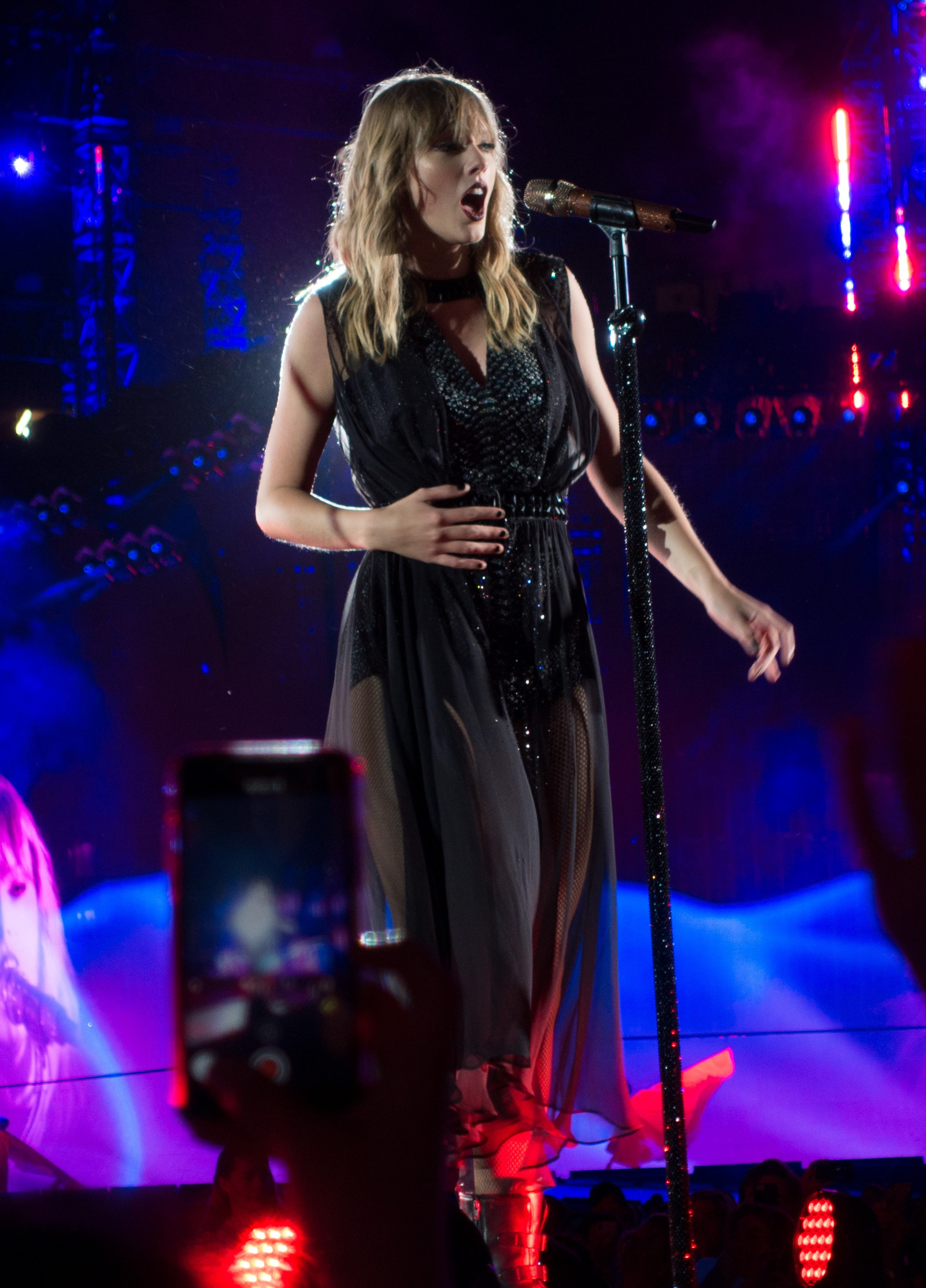
Swift performing "Dress" at the Reputation Stadium Tour

Swift included "Dress" in the set list of her 2018 Reputation Stadium Tour; a white-robed figure with extended arms weaving white fabric ran around her, while she performed the song wearing a one-piece suit and a complementary black gown. During the concerts, at the end of the song, she dedicated the choreography of the song's performance to the dancer Loie Fuller: the screen flashed a note calling Fuller a "pioneer in the arts, dance, and design who fought for artists to own their work". Vogue's Laird Borrelli-Persson opined that Fuller's failed attempt of protecting her "famed and much copied" serpentine dance from copyright paralleled to Swift losing the rights of her first six studio albums to Big Machine in 2019.

Swift performed "Dress" at the Eras Tour four times: on August 7, 2023 in Los Angeles; on March 2, 2024 in Singapore in a mashup with "I Don't Wanna Live Forever" (2016); on July 5, 2024 in Amsterdam in a mashup with "Imgonnagetyouback" (2024); and on October 27, 2024 in New Orleans in a mashup with "Afterglow" (2019).

In September 2025, the song was featured in the finale of the television series The Summer I Turned Pretty, playing while the characters Belly (Lola Tung) and Conrad (Christopher Briney) have sex for the first time since they had dated each other in high school. Fans of both Swift and the series shared enthusiastic reactions to the song's inclusion on social media.

In September–October 2025, "Dress" reached number 130 on the Billboard Global 200 chart, number 64 on the Philippines Hot 100 chart, and number 54 on the UK Singles Sales chart. "Dress" received certifications in Australia (platinum), New Zealand (platinum), and the United Kingdom (silver).

== Personnel ==
Adapted from the liner notes of Reputation

- Taylor Swift – vocals, songwriter, producer
- Jack Antonoff – producer, songwriter, programming, instruments
- Laura Sisk – engineering
- John Hanes – mixing
- Serban Ghenea – mixing

== Charts ==
Weekly chart performance
Chart (2025)	Peak position
Global 200 (Billboard)	130
Philippines (Philippines Hot 100)	64
UK Singles Sales (OCC)	54

== Certifications ==
Certifications
Region	Certification	Certified units/sales
Australia (ARIA)	Platinum	70,000^{‡}
New Zealand (RMNZ)	Platinum	30,000^{‡}
United Kingdom (BPI)	Gold	400,000^{‡}
^{‡} Sales+streaming figures based on certification alone.
