= I Did Something Bad =

2017 song by Taylor Swift

Song by Taylor Swift

from the album Reputation
- Released: November 10, 2017
- Studio: MXM (Los Angeles, California & Stockholm, Sweden)
- Genre: EDM; electro-trap
- Length: 3:58
- Label: Big Machine
- Songwriters: Taylor Swift; Max Martin; Shellback
- Producers: Max Martin; Shellback

Audio video
- "I Did Something Bad" on YouTube

"I Did Something Bad" is a song by the American singer-songwriter Taylor Swift from her sixth studio album, Reputation (2017). Swift wrote the song with its producers, Max Martin and Shellback. It features a heavy electronic production that combines electro-trap and EDM elements, incorporating manipulated vocals and electronic instruments. The lyrics are about Swift's lack of remorse after acknowledging her allegedly wrongful behaviors that caused a sensation, inspired by the female characters Sansa and Arya Stark of the fantasy series Game of Thrones.

The song received mixed reviews from critics, who were either impressed by the production and Swift's self-assertion or critical of the themes of drama and vengeance. "I Did Something Bad" charted at number 14 on the Bubbling Under Hot 100, an extension to the US Billboard Hot 100, and at number five on the New Zealand Heatseeker Singles, an extension to the New Zealand Singles Chart. Swift included the song on the set list of her Reputation Stadium Tour (2018) and performed it at the 2018 American Music Awards.

== Background and writing ==
Taylor Swift released her fifth studio album, 1989, in October 2014 to commercial success. The album sold over six million copies in the U.S. and spawned three Billboard Hot 100 number-one singles: "Shake It Off", "Blank Space", and "Bad Blood". Swift continued to be a major target of tabloid gossip during the promotion of 1989. She had romantic relationships with the Scottish producer Calvin Harris and the English actor Tom Hiddleston. Her reputation was blemished from publicized disputes with other celebrities, including the rapper Kanye West, the media personality Kim Kardashian, and the singer Katy Perry. Swift became increasingly reticent on social media, having maintained an active presence with a large following, and avoided interactions with the press amidst the tumultuous affairs.

She conceived her sixth studio album, Reputation, as an answer to the media commotion surrounding her celebrity. Describing the album as "cathartic", Swift followed the songwriting for her 2014 single "Blank Space", on which she satirized her perceived image. She said: "I took that template of, OK, this is what you're all saying about me. Let me just write from this character for a second." The final cut of Reputation consists of 15 tracks, all of which Swift co-wrote. The Swedish producers Max Martin and Shellback co-wrote and produced nine songs, including "I Did Something Bad".

== Composition ==
Swift wrote "I Did Something Bad" with its producers, Max Martin and Shellback. The song has a length of three minutes and fifty-eight seconds. Swift initially developed the track on a piano; in an interview with iHeartRadio, Swift explained that the idea for the production came to her in a dream. She described the concept to Martin, who used Swift's voice and pitched it down to create the desired effect in the post-chorus. The track was engineered at MXM Studios in Los Angeles and Stockholm. It was mixed at Mixstar Studios in Virginia Beach, Virginia, and mastered at Sterling Sound Studios in New York City.

"I Did Something Bad"
Accompanied by a heavy electronic production featuring stomping beats and manipulated vocals, "I Did Something Bad" is Swift's answer to the media commotion surrounding her celebrity.

"I Did Something Bad" was described by Billboard as "electro-trap". Rolling Stone critic Rob Sheffield characterized it as 1990s grunge, a sound that recalls the music of Eddie Vedder and Scott Weiland. Hannah Mylrae from NME, meanwhile, called it an EDM cut with a dubstep-tinged refrain. The song is accompanied by a maximalist electronic production, backed by a stomping beat, pulsing synthesizers, manipulated vocals, and an Auto-Tune-modified bridge.

For the lyrics, Swift took inspiration from the season seven finale episode "The Dragon and the Wolf" of the fantasy series Game of Thrones, in which the sisters Sansa and Arya Stark together plot a scheme to murder Littlefinger for his treachery. Media publications interpreted "I Did Something Bad" as Swift's answer to the tumultuous media scrutiny on her personal life and celebrity, affected by the publicized disputes and relationships with other celebrities. In the song, Swift portrays a self-confident character who is unapologetic for her success and defies her detractors. She tells a man who crossed her, "I don't regret it one bit / 'cause he had it coming." She also hints that strong women often get chastised by society: "They're burning all the witches, even if you aren't one / Go ahead and light me up." Despite not being listed as explicit on digital and streaming versions of the song, the lyric "If a man talks shit then I owe him nothing" marks Swift's first lyric in which she uses profanity. When Reputation was re-released on Apple Music in Dolby Atmos in December 2025, the lyric "I don't regret it one bit, cause he had it coming" was changed to "And if he calls me a bitch, then he had it coming."

== Release and live performances ==
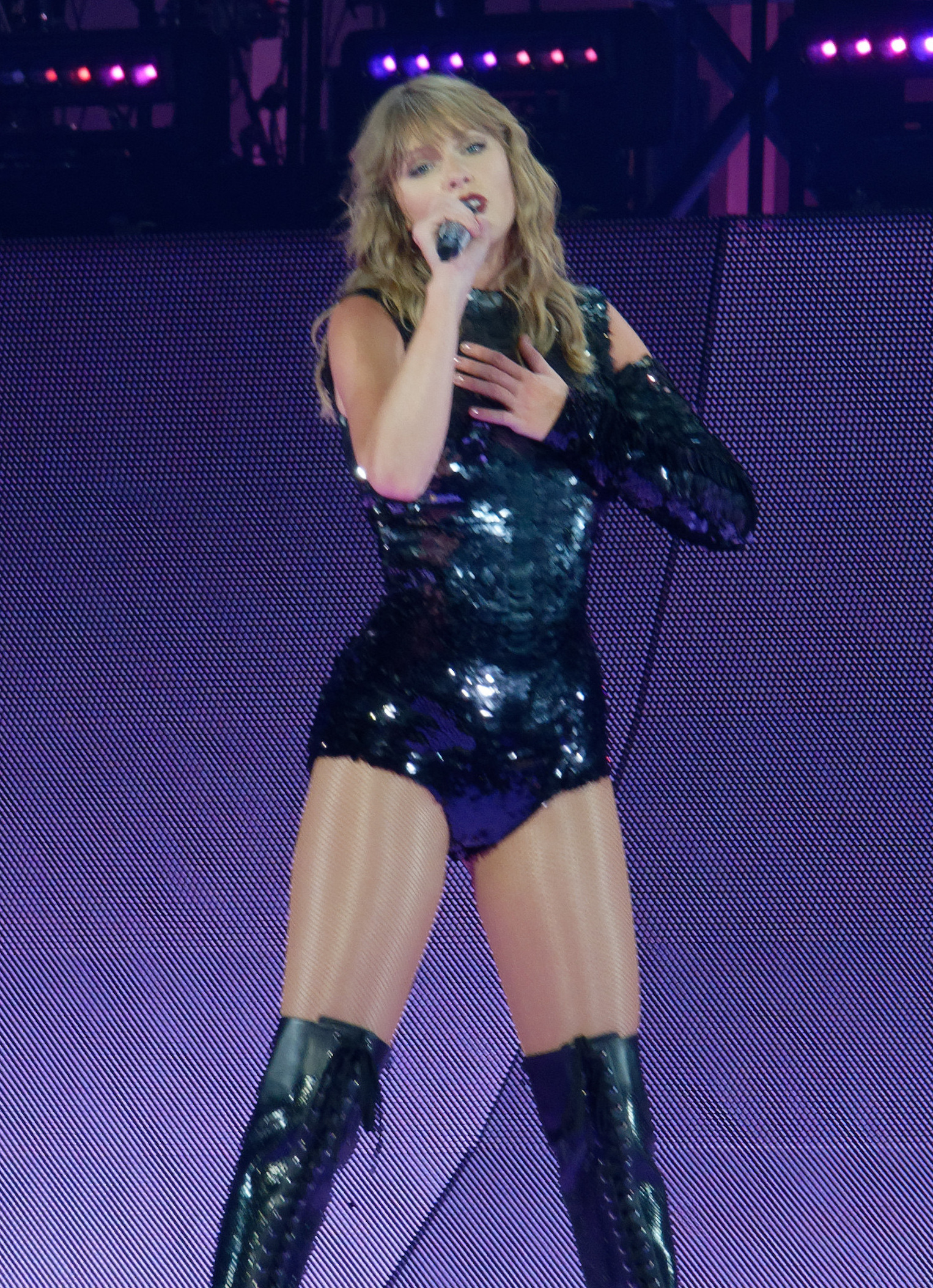
Swift performing "I Did Something Bad" on her Reputation Stadium Tour (2018)

"I Did Something Bad" is track number three on Reputation, which was released worldwide on November 10, 2017, by Big Machine Records. The song debuted at number five on the New Zealand Heatseeker Singles, an extension to the New Zealand Singles Chart. In the U.S., it peaked at number 14 on the Billboard Bubbling Under Hot 100, a 25-position extension to the Billboard Hot 100. On September 6, 2024, the song was certified gold by the British Phonographic Industry (BPI) for sales and streams of over 400,000 units.

On October 9, 2018, Swift opened the 2018 American Music Awards with a performance of "I Did Something Bad". The performance began with the song's intro as the stage appeared in red lights. Swift, accompanied by dancers, performed in front of a U-shaped structure, from which a model of a giant cobra emerged towards the end. It was Swift's fifth time performing at the American Music Awards. Some media publications interpreted the performance as Swift's implicit political statement, after she had publicly endorsed political candidates for the first time for the 2018 United States elections. Meanwhile, Melissa Locker from Time called it "decidedly unpolitical". Andrew Unterberger writing for Billboard called it one of the best performances of the award ceremony. He deemed it "appropriately massive, with brilliantly deliberate pacing, a perfect pause-for-effect after her 'If a man talks shit then I owe him nothing' lyric, and the best awards show use of a massive snake since Britney Spears in 2001". Swift included the song on the set list of her Reputation Stadium Tour (2018), performed it on acoustic guitar as a surprise song on the Eras Tour (2023–2024), during the London and Miami stops, and performed it on the piano in a mashup with "Cassandra" (2024) and "Mad Woman" (2020).

== Critical reception ==
"I Did Something Bad" received mixed reviews. Leah Greenblatt from Entertainment Weekly noted the track as an example for Swift's new defiant attitude on Reputation, where she makes confessional songs about "seduction, alcohol, and the soul-numbing isolation of fame", which does not successfully show Swift's abilities as a songwriter. Writing for Slant Magazine, Sal Cinquemani observed that "I Did Something Bad" is one of the songs that make Reputation "impenetrable", leaving listeners to "search for the humanity". In a review for Consequence of Sound, Jeoff Nelson found the song a failed attempt at "that bigger, wider, and louder" sound in pop music, calling it an inferior version of Lorde's 2017 album Melodrama.

On a positive side, Time's Raise Bruner complimented the lyrics for featuring "blazing imagery". Jordan Bassett from NME deemed "I Did Something Bad" a song that represents the album. Vulture's Nate Jones opined that "I Did Something Bad" should have been Reputation's lead single rather than "Look What You Made Me Do", writing: "not only does 'Something Bad' sell the lack of remorse much better, it bangs harder than any other song on pop radio this summer except 'Bodak Yellow'." Writing for the same website, Craig Jenkins wrote that the song's "delighted meanness [...] felt corrective" and "humanized" Swift after her celebrity controversies. Rob Sheffield of Rolling Stone said: "This is just waiting for her to turn it into a head-banging live guitar monster."

Usage In Media

The song was playing during the end credits of the 2025 film The Housemaid (2025 film).

== Credits and personnel ==
Credits are adapted from the liner notes of Reputation.

- Taylor Swift – vocals, songwriter
- Max Martin – producer, songwriter, programming, keyboards
- Shellback – producer, songwriter, programming, keyboards
- Sam Holland – engineer
- Michael Ilbert – engineer
- Cory Bice – assistant engineer
- Jeremy Lertola – assistant engineer
- Serban Ghenea – mixing
- John Hanes – mix engineer
- Randy Merrill – mastering

== Charts ==
Chart performance for "I Did Something Bad"
Chart (2017)	Peak position
New Zealand Heatseeker Singles (Recorded Music NZ)	5
US Bubbling Under Hot 100 (Billboard)	14

== Certifications ==
Certifications for "I Did Something Bad"
Region	Certification	Certified units/sales
Australia (ARIA)	2× Platinum	140,000^{‡}
Brazil (Pro-Música Brasil)	Platinum	40,000^{‡}
New Zealand (RMNZ)	Platinum	30,000^{‡}
United Kingdom (BPI)	Gold	400,000^{‡}
^{‡} Sales+streaming figures based on certification alone.
