= Don't Blame Me (Taylor Swift song) =

2017 song by Taylor Swift

Song by Taylor Swift

from the album Reputation
- Released: November 10, 2017
- Studio: MXM (Stockholm and Los Angeles)
- Genre: EDM; electropop; gospel
- Length: 3:56
- Label: Big Machine
- Songwriters: Taylor Swift; Max Martin; Shellback
- Producers: Max Martin; Shellback

Audio video
- "Don't Blame Me" on YouTube

"Don't Blame Me" is a song by the American singer-songwriter Taylor Swift from her sixth studio album, Reputation (2017). She wrote the song with its producers, Max Martin and Shellback. "Don't Blame Me" combines electropop, EDM, and gospel, with elements of industrial music. Its production is driven by heavy bass, pulsing synthesizers, and manipulated vocals. The lyrics are about Swift's declaration of an unapologetic love, using imagery of drug addiction and religion.

Music critics described the production as dark, dense, and moody. Some reviews deemed "Don't Blame Me" an album highlight, while some others regarded it as generic. After becoming viral on TikTok in 2022, the song charted in several territories, peaking in the top 20 in Australia, Norway, and Singapore. It has been certified multi-platinum in Australia, New Zealand, and the UK. Swift performed "Don't Blame Me" on the Reputation Stadium Tour (2018) and the Eras Tour (2023–2024).

== Background ==
Taylor Swift released her fifth studio album, 1989, in October 2014 to commercial success. The album sold over six million copies in the U.S. and spawned three Billboard Hot 100 number-one singles: "Shake It Off", "Blank Space", and "Bad Blood". Swift continued to be a major target of tabloid gossip during the promotion of 1989. She had short-lived romantic relationships with the Scottish producer Calvin Harris and the English actor Tom Hiddleston. Her reputation was blemished from publicized disputes with other celebrities, including the rapper Kanye West, the media personality Kim Kardashian, and the singer Katy Perry. Swift became increasingly reticent on social media, having maintained an active presence with a large following, and avoided interactions with the press amidst the tumultuous affairs.

She conceived her sixth studio album, Reputation, as an answer to the media commotion surrounding her celebrity. Describing the album as "cathartic", Swift followed the songwriting for her 2014 single "Blank Space", on which she satirized her perceived image. She said: "I took that template of, OK, this is what you're all saying about me. Let me just write from this character for a second." The final cut of Reputation consists of 15 tracks, all of which Swift co-wrote.

== Composition ==
"Don't Blame Me" was written by Swift and its producers, Max Martin, and Shellback. Both Martin and Shellback played keyboards, and the latter played guitar. Swift and Martin provided background vocals. Sam Holland and Michael Ilbert, with engineering assistants Cory Bice and Jeremy Lertola, engineered the track at MXM Studios in Los Angeles and Stockholm. It was mixed by Serban Ghenea at MixStar Studios in Virginia Beach, Virginia, and mastered by Randy Merrill at Sterling Sound Studios in New York City.

"Don't Blame Me"
"Don't Blame Me" combines electropop, EDM, and gospel, with a soundscape drenched in synthesizers and vocal harmonies.

"Don't Blame Me" combines electropop and EDM; Ken Tucker of NPR described the genre as "gospel pop", and Alan Corr of RTÉ wrote that the track had an "industrial gospel" freel. Rolling Stone's Rob Sheffield characterized it as "moody 'bad girl goes to church'", a sound that recalls Madonna's "Like a Prayer" (1989). Hannah Mylrae from NME described the production as "thundering, foot-stomping, fist-pumping". The song is accompanied by a dark, moody electronic production and a "church-y sound" for the refrain. Its instrumentation includes pulsing drums, surging synthesizers, a heavy bass, and distorted, multitracked vocals. Spin's Monique Mendelez compared its "thunderous gothic church soundscape" to the sound of Hozier's "Take Me to Church" (2013). Alexis Petridis from The Guardian found the track's chord progression to be similar to that on Britney Spears's "...Baby One More Time" (1998).

For the lyrics, media publications interpreted "Don't Blame Me" as Swift's unapologetic attitude reflecting her reputation as a songwriter who mostly wrote about love and past relationships. Swift hints at "how crazy her newest lover made her". In the song, she also replies to the criticism she endured for singing about her relationships. She understands the concept of consequence as she declares her love. She uses religious imagery, "I would fall from grace / Just to touch your face" and makes references to addiction ("Oh, lord save me, my drug is baby"). Neil McCormick from The Daily Telegraph interpreted the song as a contemplation on whether love can survive in the presence of media scrutiny. In the South African edition of GQ, Bernd Fischer thought the song shows a more vulnerable side of Swift despite its title suggesting otherwise. The track also contains a reference to The Great Gatsby where Swift refers to herself as "your Daisy".

== Release and commercial performance ==
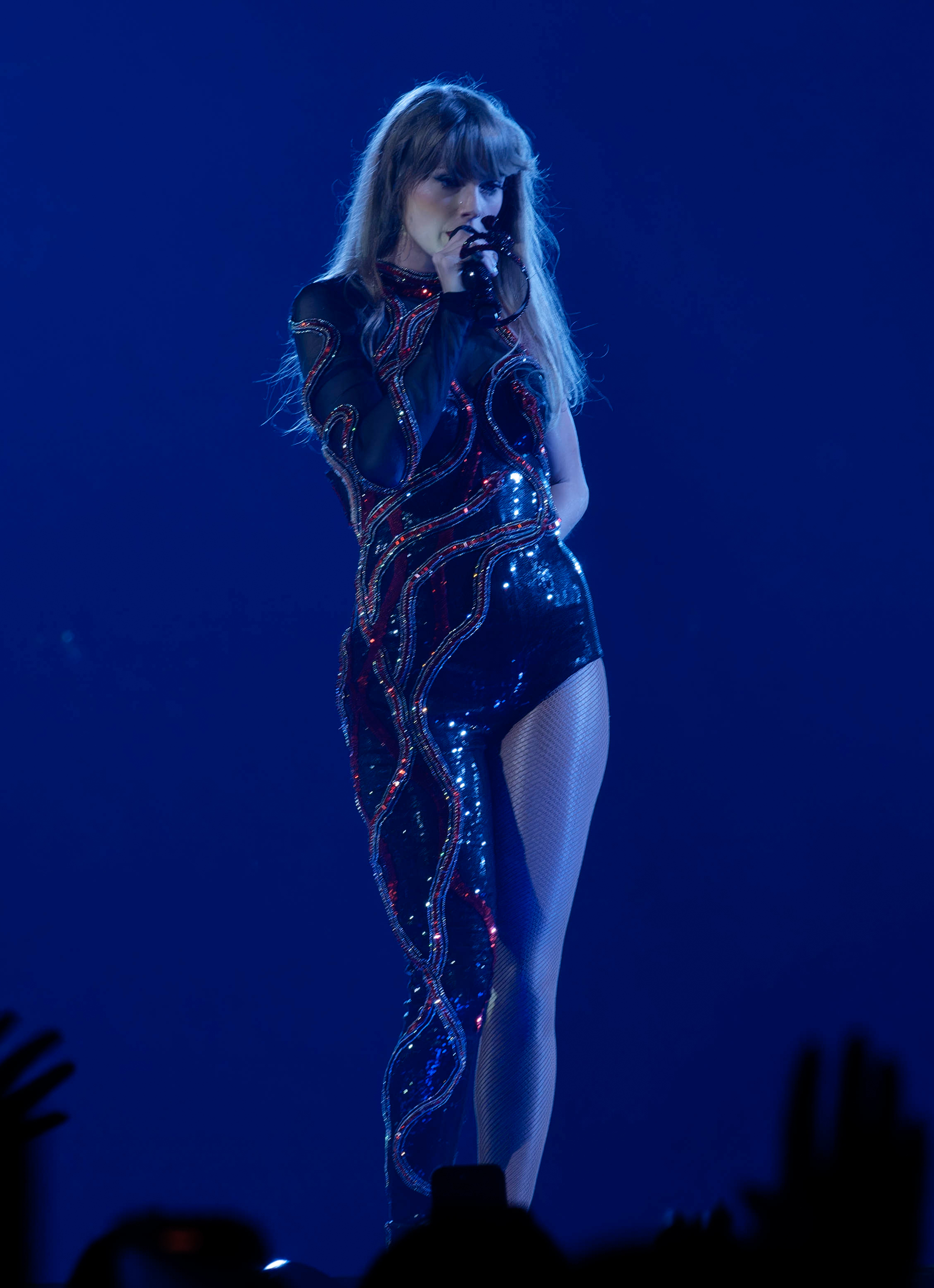
Swift performing "Don't Blame Me" on the Eras Tour (2023)

"Don't Blame Me" is track number four on Reputation, which was released in various countries on November 10, 2017, by Big Machine Records. Swift included the song on the set list of her Reputation Stadium Tour (2018). She again featured the song in the set list of her sixth headlining tour, the Eras Tour (2023–2024).

In May–June 2022, "Don't Blame Me" gained traction on the video-sharing app TikTok and entered several record charts. It appeared on the charts across various European countries, peaking within the top 50 in Norway (18), the Czech Republic (33), and Austria (49). In the wider English-speaking world, "Don't Blame Me" peaked at number 16 in Australia and at number 77 in the United Kingdom. On the Billboard Global 200 chart, the track peaked at number 118. The track was certified gold in several European countries including Norway, Greece, Poland, and Portugal. In New Zealand it was certified platinum, in the United Kingdom double platinum, while in Australia, it was certified five-times platinum. Rolling Stone noted that, despite never charting on the Billboard Hot 100, "Don't Blame Me" has amassed over a billion streams on Spotify.

== Critical reception ==
"Don't Blame Me" received mostly positive reviews from critics. Melendez opined that "Don't Blame Me" was the song that represented Reputation, praising the production and lyrics. Pitchfork's Jamieson Cox called the song a "glittering [monster] held together by Swift's presence at their center". Writing for PopMatters, Evan Sawdy deemed the track a highlight on the album. In other reviews, Petridis, McCormick, and Ellen Peirson-Hagger from Under the Radar picked it as an album highlight. Peirson-Hagger noticed its "warming, singalong, confessional style intriguingly dark", while McCormick highlighted its "pithy observations, insidious melodies and intimately conversational vocals".

On a less positive note, Eleanor Graham from The Line of Best Fit and Uppy Chatterjee from The Music found the EDM/electronic-influenced production ineffective partly because the sound had already been hugely popular on the charts, although the latter acknowledged that the track had some "deeply personal" lyrics. Rudy K. from Sputnikmusic commented that the track "begs for a more nimble voice than Swift can give". In a review for Atwood Magazine, Nicole Almeida found the drug metaphor in the lyrics clichéd.

== Personnel ==
Credits are adapted from the liner notes of Reputation.

- Taylor Swift – lead vocals, backing vocals, songwriting
- Max Martin – production, songwriting, keyboards, backing vocals
- Shellback – production, songwriting, guitars, keyboards
- Sam Holland – engineering
- Michael Ilbert – engineering
- Cory Bice – assistant engineering
- Jeremy Lertola – assistant engineering
- Serban Ghenea – mixing
- John Hanes – mix engineering
- Randy Merrill – mastering

== Charts ==
=== Weekly charts ===
Weekly chart performance for "Don't Blame Me"
Chart (2022–2024)	Peak position
Australia (ARIA)	16
Austria (Ö3 Austria Top 40)	49
Czech Republic Singles Digital (ČNS IFPI)	33
Germany (GfK)	99
Global 200 (Billboard)	107
Greece International (IFPI)	33
Hungary (Stream Top 40)	31
Ireland (IRMA)	55
Lithuania (AGATA)	63
Norway (VG-lista)	18
Portugal (AFP)	153
Singapore (RIAS)	17
Slovakia Singles Digital (ČNS IFPI)	52
Sweden (Sverigetopplistan)	100
Switzerland (Schweizer Hitparade)	88
UK Singles (Official Charts)	77

=== Year-end charts ===
2023 year-end chart performance of "Don't Blame Me"
Chart (2023)	Position
Global 200 (Billboard)	161

== Certifications ==
Certifications for "Don't Blame Me"
Region	Certification	Certified units/sales
Australia (ARIA)	5× Platinum	350,000^{‡}
Austria (IFPI Austria)	Platinum	30,000^{‡}
Brazil (Pro-Música Brasil)	Platinum	40,000^{‡}
Denmark (IFPI Danmark)	Platinum	90,000^{‡}
France (SNEP)	Platinum	200,000^{‡}
Germany (BVMI)	Gold	300,000^{‡}
Italy (FIMI)	Gold	50,000^{‡}
New Zealand (RMNZ)	3× Platinum	90,000^{‡}
Norway (IFPI Norway)	Gold	30,000^{‡}
Poland (ZPAV)	Platinum	50,000^{‡}
Portugal (AFP)	Platinum	10,000^{‡}
Spain (Promusicae)	Platinum	60,000^{‡}
United Kingdom (BPI)	2× Platinum	1,200,000^{‡}
Streaming
Greece (IFPI Greece)	Platinum	2,000,000^{†}
^{‡} Sales+streaming figures based on certification alone.^{†} Streaming-only figures based on certification alone.
