= Getaway Car (Taylor Swift song) =

2018 single by Taylor Swift

Single by Taylor Swift

from the album Reputation
- Released: September 7, 2018
- Studio: Rough Customer (Brooklyn Heights)
- Genre: Synth-pop
- Length: 3:53
- Label: Big Machine
- Songwriters: Taylor Swift; Jack Antonoff
- Producers: Taylor Swift; Jack Antonoff

Taylor Swift singles chronology
"Babe" (2018)	"Getaway Car" (2018)	"Me!" (2019)

Audio video
- "Getaway Car" on YouTube

"Getaway Car" is a song by the American singer-songwriter Taylor Swift from her sixth studio album, Reputation (2017). It was released as the album's final single in Australia and New Zealand on September 7, 2018, by Big Machine Records, to support the Australasian shows of Swift's Reputation Stadium Tour. Swift wrote and produced "Getaway Car" with Jack Antonoff. A synth-pop song, it features pulsing synthesizers, programmed drums, and distorted vocals.

The lyrics depict Swift's narrator attempting to exit a relationship by getting together with someone else, knowing that the new relationship will also end soon because its purpose was only to escape from the first one. Music critics lauded the song's production and lyrics as cinematic, detail-heavy, and intricate. Some critics highlighted it one of the best tracks on Reputation and within Swift's discography. The song charted and has been certified multi-platinum in Australia and New Zealand.

== Writing and composition ==
"Getaway Car"
"A sample of "Getaway Car". depicting the chorus and the synth-pop production.

"Getaway Car" was written and produced by Taylor Swift and Jack Antonoff. It was recorded by Swift for her sixth studio album, Reputation (2017). The song was engineered by Laura Sisk at Rough Customer Studio (Brooklyn Heights). It was mixed by Serban Ghenea at Mixstar Studios (Virginia Beach, Virginia) and mastered by Randy Merrill at Sterling Sound Studios (New York). "Getaway Car" is a synth-pop song that critics—including Rob Sheffield of Rolling Stone—felt reminiscent of the production of Swift's 2014 studio album 1989. Pitchfork's Jamieson Cox said that the song specifically resembles "Out of the Woods", a song on 1989 that was also produced by Swift and Antonoff. The song features pulsing synthesizers, programmed drums, and manipulated vocals. The beginning of the song uses a vocoder for Swift's vocals. The song's lyrics are about Swift's efforts to run away from a relationship to be with someone else, only to realize that this new relationship will also end.

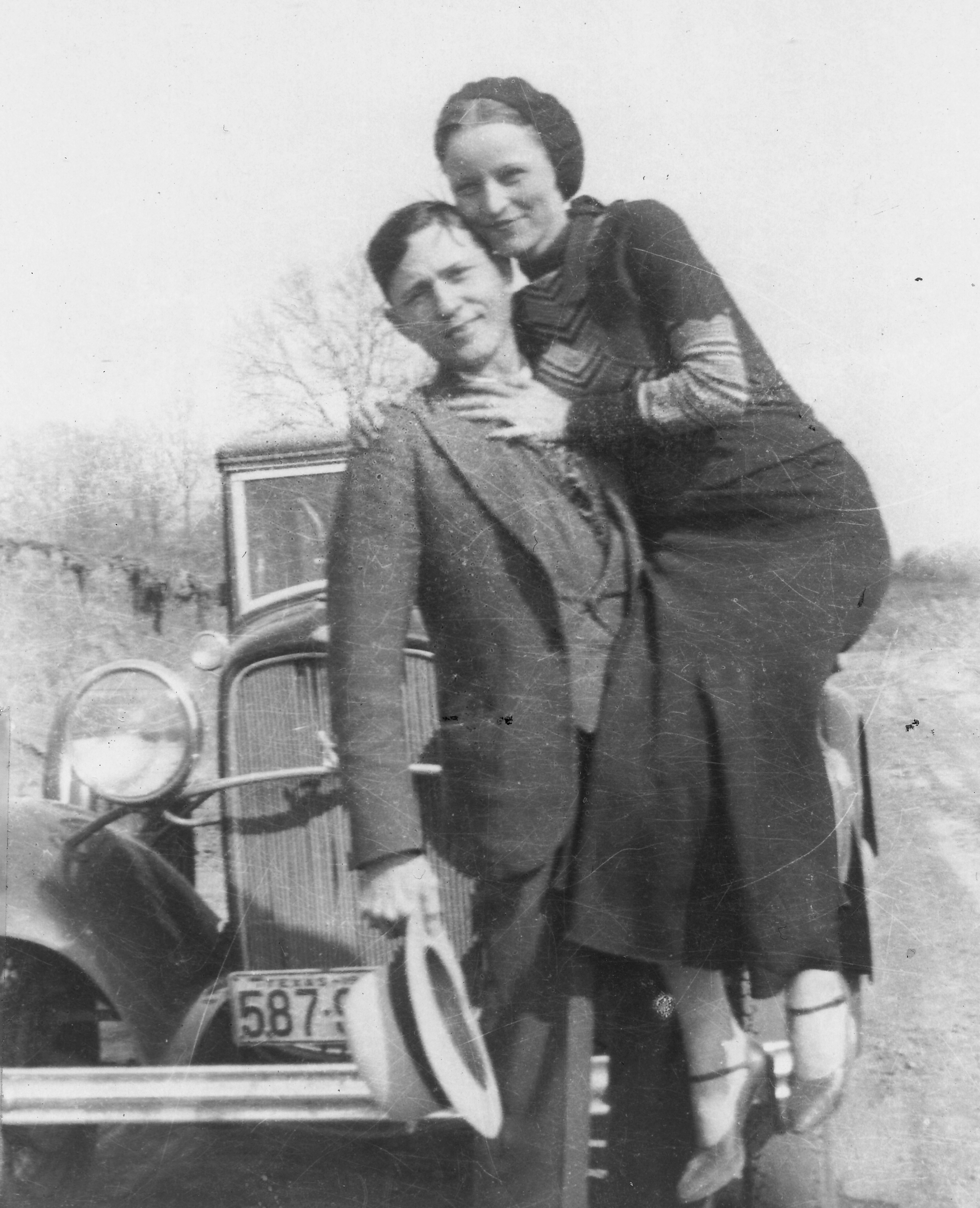
"Getaway Car" references the criminal couple Bonnie and Clyde in its lyrics.

In the first verse, she admits: "The ties were black, the lies were white / In shades of gray in candlelight / I wanted to leave him, I needed a reason." The line in the bridge, "X marks the spot where we fell apart" is also a line in Hilary Duff's 2015 song Breathe In. Breathe Out on the album by the same name; in a now deleted Tumblr post from June 25, 2015, Swift said this song was her favorite from Duff's album. Coincidentally the words "getaway car" also appear on another song from the same Hilary Duff album, Outlaw, a Deluxe Edition-only track. The production builds up for the refrain, in which Swift reflects on her treachery: "Should've known I'd be the first to leave / Think about the place where you first met me / Nothing good starts in a getaway car." The lyrics, "He was running after us / I was screaming 'Go, go, go!' / But with three of us, honey, it's a sideshow," implies a love triangle that stems from Swift's affairs. Swift recalls that the couple were "jet-set, Bonnie and Clyde," until she abandons him for a new man, referencing the criminal couple Bonnie and Clyde. She ponders on how she had left her lover abruptly: "I'm in a getaway car / I left you in a motel bar / Put the money in the bag and I stole the keys / That was the last time you ever saw me." Uppy Chatterjee from the Australian magazine The Music also pointed out the song's references to the rock band Bon Jovi's song "You Give Love a Bad Name" (1986). NME's Hannah Mylrea also noticed references to writer Charles Dickens and the epic war film The Great Escape (1963).

== Release and chart performance ==
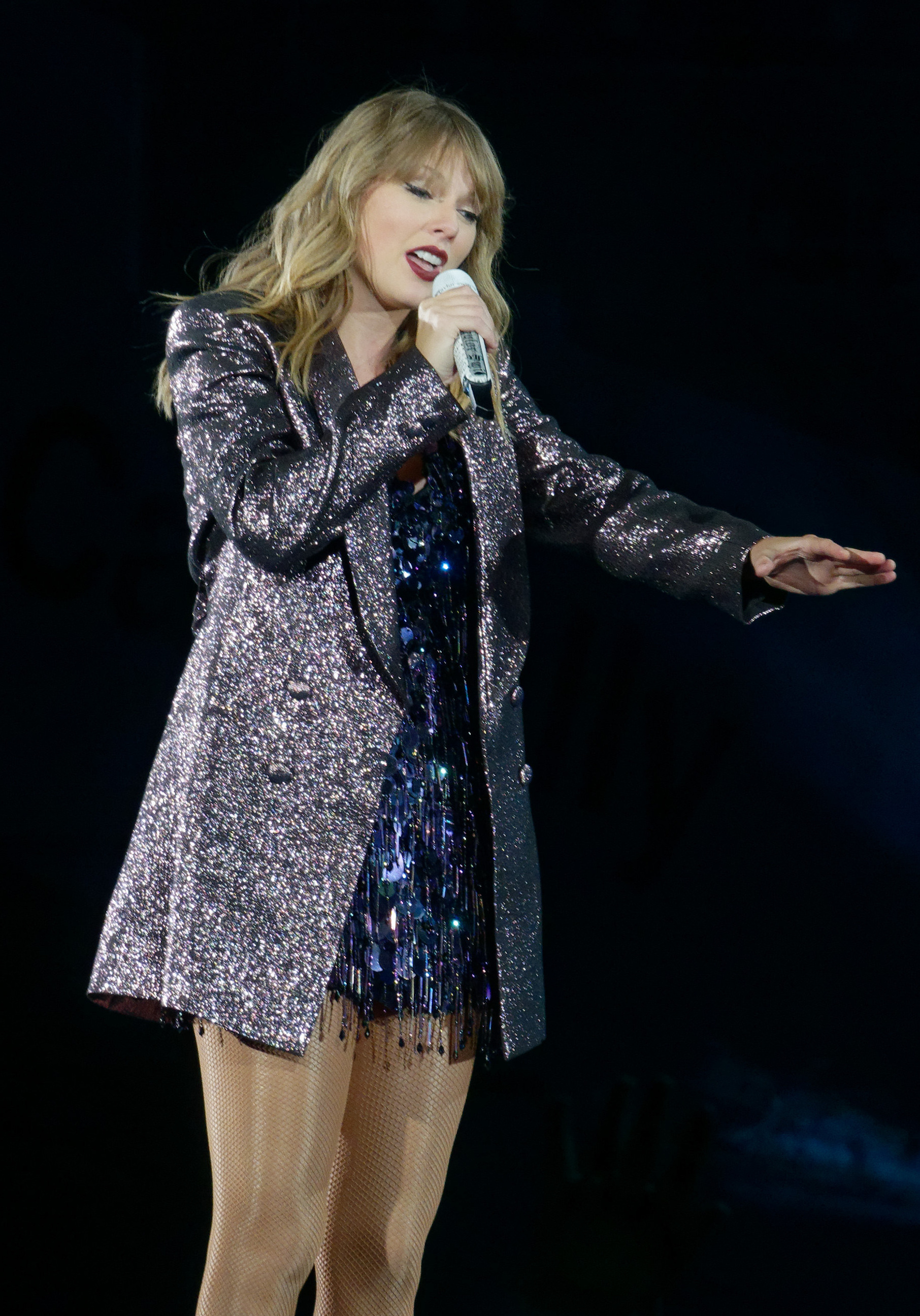
Swift performing "Getaway Car" on her Reputation Stadium Tour (2018)

On September 7, 2018, Universal Music Australia announced that "Getaway Car" would serve as a single exclusively in Australia and New Zealand. The song was released to Australian and New Zealand contemporary hit radio stations by Universal and Big Machine Records. This release was intended to support the then-upcoming Australian shows of Swift's Reputation Stadium Tour (2018). "Getaway Car" was included on the regular set list of the Reputation Stadium Tour, as part of the encore. Swift performed the song with Antonoff at the May 26, 2023, East Rutherford show of the Eras Tour. In 2024, she sang it four times as part of mashups with her other tracks on the Eras Tour; the first one was with "August" (2020) and "The Other Side of the Door" (2010) at Melbourne on February 17, the second was with "The Bolter" (2024) at Edinburgh on June 8, the third was with "Out of the Woods" (2014) at Milan on July 14, and the fourth was with "Death by a Thousand Cuts" (2024) at London on August 20, where she was joined by Antonoff. "Getaway Car" has been described as a fan favorite among Swift's fans.

Initially, "Getaway Car" did not chart on the official singles chart of Australia and New Zealand. It peaked at number 26 on the Australian Digital Tracks, a songs chart based on digital sales, and number six on the TMN Hot 100, an airplay-focused chart powered by Australian magazine The Music Network. The song was certified quadruple platinum by the Australian Recording Industry Association (ARIA). In New Zealand, it peaked at number nine on the New Zealand Hot Singles, a chart compiled by the Recorded Music NZ.

== Critical reception ==
Zack Schonfeld of Newsweek called "Getaway Car" as an "excellent, radiant song" and claimed that the hook is "massive, in both catchiness and energy". In a review of Reputation, Louis Bruton from The Irish Times praised the song for its showcase of "clever and insightful songwriting, finding tenderness and beauty in tiny details". Consequence of Sound was not impressed with the album's production, but considered "Getaway Car" one of its strongest moments, and wrote that "the song's hook hits but doesn't punish". Eleanor Graham from The Line of Best Fit, Sarah Murphy from Exclaim! and John Murphy from musicOMH similarly lauded the track as one of Reputation's strongest moments, and highlighted the song's intriguing lyrics.

The Atlantic's Spencer Kornharber described "Getaway Car" as Reputation's "savior: the one true tune to hum misty-eyed after the movies". Stephen Thomas Erlewine of AllMusic lauded the song as a high mark on the "monochromatic production" of Reputation for its combination of "vulnerability, melody, and confidence, but they are deeply felt and complex", which signified Swift's maturity as a singer-songwriter. Retrospectively, Rob Sheffield of Rolling Stone compared Swift's songwriting on "Getaway Car" to Paul McCartney because of "the way she goes overboard with her latest enthusiasm and starts Tay-splaining it as her personal discovery", and lauded the cinematic quality of the lyrics.

== Credits and personnel ==
Credits are adapted from the booklet of Reputation.

- Taylor Swift – vocals, songwriter, producer
- Jack Antonoff – producer, songwriter, programming, instruments, background vocals
- Laura Sisk – audio engineering
- Serban Ghenea – mixing
- John Hanes – mix engineer
- Randy Merrill – mastering
- John Hutchinson – drums
- Victoria Parker – violins
- Phillip A. Peterson – cellos

== Charts ==
Chart (2018)	Peak position
Australian Digital Tracks (ARIA)	33
New Zealand Hot Singles (RMNZ)	9

Chart (2024)	Peak position
Australia (ARIA)	96

== Certifications ==
Certifications for "Getaway Car"
Region	Certification	Certified units/sales
Australia (ARIA)	4× Platinum	280,000^{‡}
Brazil (Pro-Música Brasil)	Gold	20,000^{‡}
New Zealand (RMNZ)	2× Platinum	60,000^{‡}
Spain (Promusicae)	Gold	30,000^{‡}
United Kingdom (BPI)	Platinum	600,000^{‡}
^{‡} Sales+streaming figures based on certification alone.

== Release history ==
Region	Date	Format	Label	Ref.
Australia; New Zealand	September 7, 2018	Radio airplay	Big Machine; Universal	
