= Reputation (album) =

Studio album by Taylor Swift
- Released: November 10, 2017
- Studios: Conway Recording (Los Angeles); MXM (Los Angeles, Stockholm); Rough Customer (Brooklyn); Seismic Activities (Portland); Tree Sound (Atlanta)
- Genres: Electropop; synth-pop; R&B; trap-pop; EDM
- Length: 55:45
- Label: Big Machine
- Producers: Taylor Swift; Max Martin; Shellback; Jack Antonoff; Ali Payami; Oscar Görres; Oscar Holter

Taylor Swift chronology
1989 (2014)	Reputation (2017)	Lover (2019)

Singles from Reputation
- 1. "Look What You Made Me Do" Released: August 24, 2017; 2. "...Ready for It?" Released: October 24, 2017; 3. "End Game" Released: November 14, 2017; 4. "New Year's Day" Released: November 27, 2017; 5. "Delicate" Released: March 12, 2018; 6. "Getaway Car" Released: September 7, 2018

Reputation (stylized in all lowercase) is the sixth studio album by the American singer-songwriter Taylor Swift. It was released on November 10, 2017, through Big Machine Records. She conceived the album during a hiatus in 2016–2017, amidst the controversies that blemished her once-wholesome public image.

Swift employed an autobiographical songwriting approach on Reputation, which references her romantic relationships and celebrity disputes. Its songs form a linear narrative of a narrator seeking vengeance against wrongdoers but ultimately finding solace in a blossoming love. Produced by Swift, Jack Antonoff, Max Martin, and Shellback, Reputation is primarily an electropop and synth-pop record that incorporates R&B, trap-pop, and EDM, with elements of hip-hop and progressive R&B. The songs feature maximalist, electronic arrangements, characterized by abrupt dynamic shifts, insistent programmed drum machines, pulsating synthesizers and bass, and manipulated vocals.

Before Reputation's release, Swift cleared out her website and social media accounts, which generated widespread media attention. The lead single "Look What You Made Me Do" peaked at number one on the Billboard Hot 100, the single "Delicate" topped US airplay charts, and the Reputation Stadium Tour (2018) marked Swift's first all-stadium concert tour. In the United States, Reputation was Swift's fourth consecutive album to sell one million first-week copies, spent four weeks atop the Billboard 200, and has been certified seven-times platinum by the Recording Industry Association of America. It topped charts and has received multi-platinum certifications in Australia, Austria, Canada, New Zealand, and the United Kingdom.

A divisive album upon release, Reputation was praised by critics for its intimate songwriting about love but criticized for its production and references to fame and celebrity, which were viewed as harsh and derivative. Some media publications deemed the album disappointing in the context of Swift's celebrity, the entertainment industry, and the political landscape of the time. Retrospective reviews have opined that the initial reception was affected by the negative press and reevaluated Reputation as a work of Swift's artistic experimentation and evolution. Reputation was nominated for Best Pop Vocal Album at the 61st Annual Grammy Awards, and it was listed on Slant Magazine's list of the best albums of the 2010s decade.

== Background ==
The American singer-songwriter Taylor Swift transformed her artistic identity from country music to pop music with her fifth studio album, the synth-pop record 1989. Released in October 2014, 1989 attained a commercial success that turned Swift into a pop icon—it spent a full year in the top 10 of the United States Billboard 200 chart, and five singles peaked in the top 10 of the United States Billboard Hot 100 chart and received heavy rotation on radio for over a year and a half.

Swift's heightened fame was accompanied by increasing media scrutiny and controversies in 2015–2016 that blemished her "America's Sweetheart" image. Critics accused her feminist identity and "squad" of female celebrity friends including fashion models, actresses, and singers, as being elitist; her romantic relationships with Calvin Harris and Tom Hiddleston as publicity stunts; and her political neutrality as an alignment with the alt-right movement. Her feud with the rapper Kanye West and the media personality Kim Kardashian over West's song "Famous", in which he claims he made Swift a success ("I made that bitch famous"), was the culmination point. Swift said she never consented to the lyric, but Kardashian released a phone recording in which Swift consented to another portion of the song.

Although the phone call was later revealed to have been purposely edited after the transcript leaked in 2020, the incident turned Swift's media image into that of a fake and calculating woman. Swift became a subject of an "IsOverParty" hashtag on Twitter, where her detractors denounced her as a "snake". Her publicity was so negative that her victory in a sexual assault trial had minimal impact in improving her image, despite it being part of a wider, ongoing public debate about sexual misconduct in the entertainment industry. Swift withdrew from social media and press interviews despite a large following and went into a hiatus in 2016–2017, believing that "people might need a break from [her]".

== Recording and conception ==
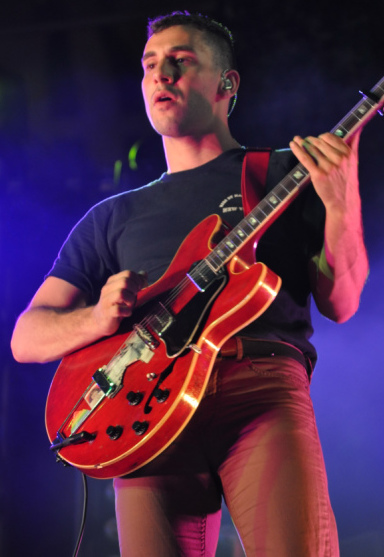
Jack Antonoff co-produced six Reputation tracks; his recording sessions with Swift mostly took place at his Brooklyn home studio.

During seclusion from public appearances, Swift wrote Reputation as a "defense mechanism" against the rampant media scrutiny targeting her and a means to revamp her state of mind. She said in a 2019 Rolling Stone interview that she followed the songwriting for her 2014 single "Blank Space", which satirizes the criticism targeting her for dating "too many people" in her twenties, and wrote Reputation from the perspective of a character that others believed her to be. In a 2023 Time interview, she described the album's creation as "a goth-punk moment of female rage at being gaslit by an entire social structure". Although the media gossip was a major inspiration, recurring romantic themes of love and friendship that had been dominant in Swift's songwriting remained intact. She recalled that amidst the "battle raging on" outside, she found solace in quiet moments with her loved ones and began creating a newfound private life on her own terms "for the first time" since starting her career.

Swift produced Reputation with two teams: one with Jack Antonoff and the other with Max Martin and Shellback; she had worked with all three on 1989. By engaging a smaller production group on Reputation than on 1989, she envisioned that the album would be more coherent but still "versatile enough". She executive produced the album and co-wrote all of its 15 tracks. Martin and Shellback co-wrote and produced nine, and Antonoff co-wrote and co-produced the remaining six, all of which were co-produced by Swift. Ali Payami, Oscar Görres, and Oscar Holter each co-wrote and co-produced a track with Martin and Shellback: "...Ready for It?", "So It Goes...", and "Dancing with Our Hands Tied". The track "End Game" features songwriting credits and guest appearances from the English singer-songwriter Ed Sheeran and the American rapper Future.

Recording sessions with Antonoff mostly took place at his home studio in Brooklyn, with several trips to Atlanta and California for him to incorporate ideas from other producers. He wanted Swift to capture her emotions at a particular time when "you can feel like you can conquer the world, or you can feel like the biggest piece of garbage that ever existed", resulting in a "very intense" record. As Swift wanted to record the album in secrecy, Antonoff kept his studio computer offline to prevent a possible internet leak and deleted the trials once the mixing and mastering finalized.

== Musical styles ==
Primarily an electropop and synth-pop album, (Note: Electropop is referenced in the Chicago Tribune, The Times, and NPR, and synth-pop is referenced in The Daily Telegraph, Slate, and Billboard) Reputation incorporates R&B, trap-pop, and EDM. It features a heavy, maximalist electronic production with EDM instrumentation and rhythms. (Note: Attributed to reviews by Tucker, Jamieson Cox for Pitchfork, and Jason Lipshutz for Billboard) The melodies are characterized by abrupt dynamic shifts, propulsive bass notes, pulsating synthesizers, and insistent programmed drum machines. Pitchfork's Jamieson Cox described the instrumentation as "hair-raising bass drops, vacuum-cleaner synths [...], stuttering trap percussion, cyborg backing choirs". Swift's voice is heavily manipulated, either distorted or multitracked. Critics found Reputation sonically heavier, louder, and darker than its predecessor 1989's bright synth-pop, with Neil McCormick from The Daily Telegraph deeming it "a big, brash, all-guns-blazing blast of weaponised pop". Swift associated Reputation's sound with imagery of "nighttime cityscape ... old warehouse buildings that had been deserted and factory spaces".

"Don't Blame Me"
"Don't Blame Me" has a gothic, gospel-influenced production with aggressive synthesizers and dubstep beats.

The album's first half, made up of mostly tracks produced by Martin and Shellback, is comparatively heavier in sound. The first four tracks—"...Ready for It?", "End Game", "I Did Something Bad", "Don't Blame Me"—are particularly aggressive. "...Ready for It?" has an industrial production backed by a thumping bassline, "End Game" features sputtering trap beats, "I Did Something Bad" is punctuated by a dubstep drop, and "Don't Blame Me" has a gothic, gospel-oriented soundscape drenched in synthesizers, dubstep beats, and vocal harmonization. (Note: Attributed to reviews by Tucker, Monique Melendez for Spin, and George Fenwick for The New Zealand Herald) "Look What You Made Me Do" uses modular synthesizers, drums, and guitars in the second pre-chorus; it incorporates an interpolation of "I'm Too Sexy" (1991) by the English band Right Said Fred. The power ballad "So It Goes..." has an atmospheric trap-pop production. "King of My Heart" features surging keyboard instruments in the pre-chorus and thumping drums in the post-chorus, and "Dancing with Our Hands Tied" is instrumented with propelling beats and an EDM refrain.

The second half, mostly driven by Antonoff's 1980s-synth-pop production characterized by pulsing synthesizers and upbeat refrains, brings forth a softer, more emotional sound. Jon Caramanica of The New York Times described the change of tone: "in the beginning, [Swift] is indignant and barbed, but by the end she's practically cooing." "Dress" features a sultry production with stuttering beats, syncopated phrasings, swirling synthesizers, and a refrain containing falsetto vocals. "Getaway Car" and "Call It What You Want" are two atmospheric synth-pop tracks. The latter, produced with an Akai MPC and strings simulated by a Yamaha DX7 synthesizer, incorporates a subdued, trap-R&B production. The closing track, the piano ballad "New Year's Day", is the album's only acoustic song; it was recorded on an acoustic piano in "scratch takes" that do not filter unwanted sounds from the outer environment.

"Delicate"
Reputation incorporates influences of many urban styles—"Delicate" incorporates a Caribbean-inflected sound, tropical house beats, and vocals processed with a vocoder, an effect that recurs throughout the album.

Influences of many urban genres, most prominently hip-hop, trap, R&B, and progressive R&B, and other subgenres including grime, tropical house, and Miami bass, coalesce on Reputation. (Note: Attributed to reviews by Ann Powers for NPR, Sal Cinquemani for Slant Magazine, and Clayton Purdom for The A.V. Club) According to Caramanica, its sound is "soft-core pop-R&B" and the musical influences are rooted in black music but Swift "[softens] them enough to where [she] can credibly attempt them". Specifically, the drum patterns embrace trap influences and push Swift's vocals toward hip-hop-and-R&B-oriented cadences, showcased through a half-spoken, half-sung delivery. Cox found this influence to strip her vocals off their expressiveness and give them a conversational quality. Other urban influences are on such tracks as "Delicate", which incorporate a Caribbean-inflected sound and tropical house beats; "Gorgeous", which features hip-hop-trademark 808 drums and rhythms; and "Dress", a slow jam. On tracks such as "Delicate", "Getaway Car", "King of My Heart", her vocals are processed with a vocoder, which NPR's Ann Powers attributed to the influence of rappers and R&B artists.

== Themes and lyrics ==
Swift said that Reputation consists of a linear timeline: it begins with how she felt when she started working on the album and transitions to how she felt by the time she completed it. Inspired by the fantasy series Game of Thrones, she split the album into two sides; one contains songs about vengeance and drama, and the other about finding love, friendship, and "something sacred throughout all the battle cries". The series' characters and little hints to foreshadow the story lines, which Swift considered "cryptic", prompted her to finesse her songwriting and include "cryptic" messages through which she hoped to communicate with fans. She identified Game of Thrones influences for certain songs: "I Did Something Bad" was inspired by Sansa and Arya Stark's plot to kill Littlefinger, "Look What You Made Me Do" by Arya Stark's "kill list", and "King of My Heart" by Daenerys Targaryen and Khal Drogo's romance.

[Reputation] was interesting because I'd never before had an album that wasn't fully understood until it was seen live. When it first came out everyone thought it was just going to be angry; upon listening to the whole thing they realized it's actually about love and friendship, and finding out what your priorities are.

— Swift, on Reputation with Entertainment Weekly, May 2019

Steven Hyden considered Reputation a concept album about Swift's celebrity and said it encapsulates her attention to the conversation about her. It references alcohol and sex more than any of Swift's previous records, which The New York Times' Lindsay Zoladz considered her gradual and deliberate decision at 27 years old to abandon her prior youthful and innocent music and image, unlike former teenage female singers who provocatively publicize their sudden "loss of innocence". Despite the first few tracks about outright vengeance and anger, much of Reputation is about romantic themes of finding love, intimacy, and expressing one's vulnerability when one thinks they might have suffered too much to love again. (Note: As described by such critics as Terrence Cawley for The Boston Globe, Rob Sheffield for Rolling Stone, and Alexis Petridis for The Guardian) For Rob Sheffield, the album is a song cycle about how one stops chasing romance and defining their life based on others' perspectives. Some critics interpreted the overarching narrative as a love story chronicling the burgeoning days, fallout, and recovery, (Note: As described by such critics as Lipshutz, Petridis, and Chris Willman for Variety) which Swift corroborated in a 2019 Rolling Stone interview: "The one-two punch, bait-and-switch of Reputation is that it was actually [...] a love story in amongst chaos."

Swift's image as a woman with serial romantic relationships and her defiant attitude against this reputation are recurring themes on the first tracks. Opener "...Ready for It?" has lyrics about falling in love with a new partner. Inspired by the novel Crime and Punishment by Fyodor Dostoevsky, it incorporates a criminal metaphor that recurs on other tracks. Swift said its mentions of bank heists, robbers, and thieves, a "twisted" but "interesting" way to depict "finding your partner in crime". In "End Game", Swift, Future, and Sheeran rap and sing about finding true love in spite of the gossip surrounding their perceived images. "I Did Something Bad" is narrated from the perspective of a female character who manipulates men and "Don't Blame Me" compares a love that "makes [her] crazy" to a drug addiction. Designated by Swift as Reputation's "first point of vulnerability", "Delicate" is where the narrator begins to worry if her tarnished reputation could affect a new romance. In the song, she wonders because "[her] reputation has never been worse", the love interest must love her for herself. The album continues with "Look What You Made Me Do", which Swift initially wrote as a poem about her realizing she "couldn't trust certain people". She indicated the most important lyrics of the song as, "Oh, I'm sorry, the old Taylor can't come to the phone right now. Why? Oh, 'cause she's dead", which reference the phone recording between her and West that Kardashian had released.

In "So It Goes...", which features sexual imagery of smeared lipstick on her lover's face and leaving scratches on his back, the narrator details how he helps her get out of her fixations and promises she will "do bad things with [him]" despite not being a "bad girl". "Gorgeous" has playful lyrics about newfound romantic attraction, where the narrator feels tempted to cheat on an existing boyfriend for another. It is followed by "Getaway Car", which uses crime scene escape imagery and a Bonnie and Clyde reference to tell the story of how the narrator leaves her former lover in a hotel room and escapes in the getaway car with a new lover. "King of My Heart" is a straightforward love song in which the narrator proclaims herself as her lover's "American queen" and how the couple rules their "kingdom inside [her] room". Swift structured the song such that each of the sections (verse, pre-chorus, chorus) depicts a separate phase of a relationship, and they altogether form a complete love story. The next track, "Dancing With Our Hands Tied", describes a narrator's reflection on a past relationship when she was 25 years old and how the lover turns her bed "into a sacred oasis".

In "Dress", which features overtly sexual lyrics, the narrator claims that she "only bought this dress" to be taken off by her lover and how she does not "want [them] like a best friend". "This Is Why We Can't Have Nice Things" was inspired by Swift's observation of how people take things for granted. It references her 4th of July parties, filled with champagne and having her "feeling so Gatsby for that whole year". In the track, the narrator calls out her enemies and former friends. When she tries to get diplomatic with them ("forgiveness is a nice thing to do"), she laughs at the idea. The two closing tracks, "Call It What You Want" and "New Year's Day", summarize Swift's state of mind after she learned how to welcome and prioritize certain things in her life. In "Call It What You Want", the narrator accepts that her reputation might be unredeemable ("They took the crown but it's alright") and meditates on the transformative power of her relationship ("My baby's fly like a jetstream, high above the whole scene"). The closing track, "New Year's Day", sees the narrator and her lover cleaning up after a New Year's party. On the inspiration, Swift explained that although kissing someone on New Year's Eve is a romantic idea, having someone by one's side the morning after "to give you Advil and clean up the house" is even more so.

== Release ==
=== Marketing and distribution ===
On August 18, 2017, Swift blanked out all of her social media accounts, which prompted media speculation on new music. In the following days, she uploaded silent short videos of CGI snakes onto social media, which attracted widespread press attention. Imagery of snakes was inspired by the West–Kardashian controversy and featured prominently in the album's promotional campaign. On August 23, she announced on Instagram the title Reputation and released the cover artwork. Photographed by Mert and Marcus, the cover is a black-and-white photograph of an expressionless Swift in slicked-back hair, a loose-fitting grey sweatshirt with a zig-zag stitch on the right shoulder, and a choker necklace. Her name is printed multiple times over one side of her face, in a typeface resembling that used in newspapers. Media outlets interpreted the design as a mockery at the media scrutiny. (Note: Attributed to opinions by Jake Nevins for The Guardian, Ludovic Hunter-Tilney for the Financial Times, and the staff for The Ringer) The cover inspired many internet memes and was listed among the worst album covers of 2017 by Billboard and Exclaim! The latter dismissed it as a "packaging for a sickly sweet, heavily discounted celebrity fragrance you'd find on the back shelf at Shoppers Drug Mart".

Reputation's lead single, "Look What You Made Me Do", was released on August 24. The single peaked at number one on the Billboard Hot 100 in its second week of charting, with the biggest single-week sales and streaming figures of 2017 in the United States, and was Swift's first number-one single in the United Kingdom; its music video broke the record for the most 24-hour views on YouTube. Shortly after the single's release, UPS announced a partnership with Swift, which included Reputation-branded trucks and award-winning contests promoting the album across US cities. Other corporate tie-ins were a Ticketmaster partnership for a concert tour; an AT&T deal for a behind-the-scenes series chronicling the making of Reputation; and a Target partnership for two deluxe album editions, each featuring an exclusive magazine with poetry, paintings, handwritten lyrics, and behind-the-scenes photography. Swift collaborated with ESPN to preview the second single, "...Ready for It?", during a college football match on September 2; it opened at number four on the Billboard Hot 100. Kate Knibbs of The Ringer labelled the partnerships as "maximum commercialization" and wrote, "If [Swift] was going to be a snake, she was going to be an ultracapitalist snake."

Prior to the album's release, the tracks "Gorgeous" and "Call It What You Want" were released for download and streaming as promotional singles, and the track "New Year's Day" premiered during the broadcast of an episode of ABC's Scandal. Reputation was released in various territories on digital and physical formats on November 10, 2017, by Big Machine Records. Although the streaming provider Spotify initially promoted Reputation on its playlists and commercial billboards, Swift and Big Machine kept the album off streaming platforms until December 1. Throughout late 2017 and early 2018, a string of singles were released to support the album: "End Game" was released to French radio by Mercury Records on November 14, "New Year's Day" impacted US country radio on November 27, and "Delicate" was released to US pop radio on March 12. The last of which was the album's most successful radio single, peaking atop three Billboard airplay charts: Pop Songs, Adult Pop Songs, and Adult Contemporary.

Swift began re-recording her first six studio albums, which include Reputation, in November 2020. This decision followed a 2019 dispute between Swift and the talent manager Scooter Braun, who acquired Big Machine Records and the masters of Swift's albums. Re-recording them would enable her to have full licensing rights of her songs for commercial use. On May 30, 2025, the dispute ended with Swift acquiring the masters to those albums; the re-recorded version of Reputation had not been completed by that point.

=== Performances ===
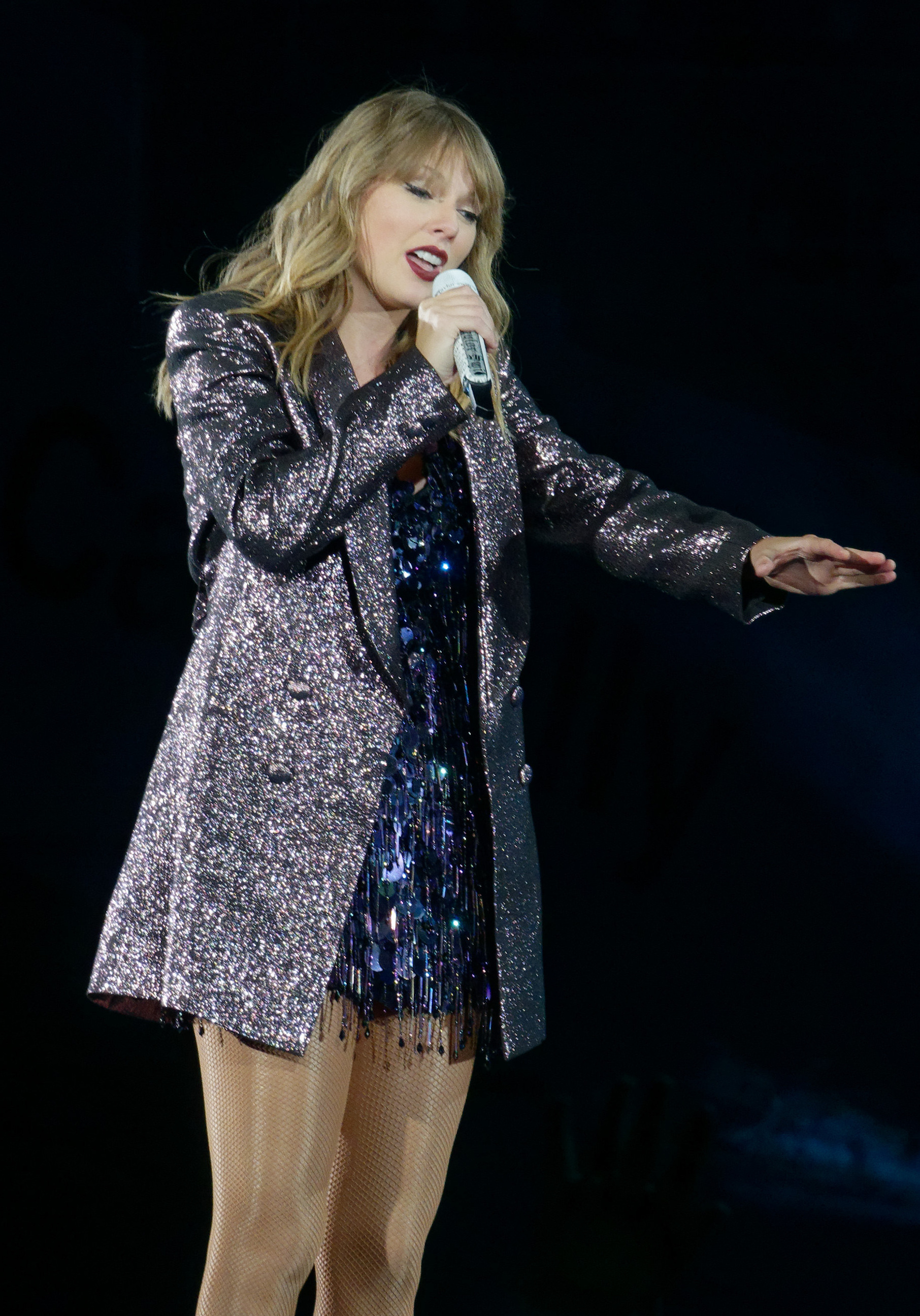
Swift performing at the Reputation Stadium Tour in 2018

Although Swift had actively promoted albums with extensive press interviews and television appearances, she opted out of such a campaign for Reputation. She instead held exclusive secret album-listening sessions within one month in advance for fans selected from social media by herself, hosting them at her homes in Rhode Island, Los Angeles, London, and Nashville. The secret sessions were reserved for 500 fans in total; behind-the-scenes footage was released on Good Morning America on November 7, 2017. She appeared on the cover for British Vogue, for which she appointed her own photographers and published a self-written poem instead of giving an interview. In an interview with Zane Lowe for Apple Music in May 2019, Swift said she turned down interviews because she felt no need to explain the album and used music as the only medium to convey her thoughts and feelings. On the title's all lowercase styling, she said it was because the album "wasn't unapologetically commercial"—that it "took the most amount of explanation, and yet it's the one [she] didn't talk about".

Within Reputation's first release week, Swift performed on Saturday Night Live ("...Ready for It?", "Call It What You Want") and The Tonight Show Starring Jimmy Fallon ("New Year's Day"). She embarked on the Reputation Stadium Tour, which kicked off on May 8, 2018, in Glendale, Arizona and featured supporting acts such as Charli XCX and Camila Cabello. The tour's visual and stage settings incorporated prominent snakes imagery. It encompassed 53 shows across four continents and wrapped up on November 21, 2018, in Tokyo, Japan. The track "Getaway Car" was released as an Australasia-exclusive single to support the Oceanic leg of the Reputation tour in October and November. Earning $266.1 million, the 38-show North American leg surpassed the Rolling Stones' 70-show US leg of their A Bigger Bang Tour ($245 million; 2005–2007) to become the all-time highest-grossing North American tour. In total, the Reputation Stadium Tour grossed $345.7 million, according to Billboard Boxscore. The second show at AT&T Stadium in Arlington, Texas, was recorded and released as a Netflix exclusive on December 31, 2018.

== Commercial performance ==
In the United States, Reputation sold 700,000 copies after one day of availability and 1.05 million after four days. The album opened at number one on the Billboard 200 with first-week figures of 1.238 million album-equivalent units that consisted of 1.216 million pure sales. It sold more than all other albums on the chart that week combined, and it immediately became the best-selling album of 2017. Reputation made Swift the first artist to have four albums each sell more than a million copies within one week since Nielsen SoundScan began tracking US music sales in 1991.

The strong sales of Reputation contributed to an industry debate over the impact of streaming on album sales, although it was eventually made available for streaming three weeks after its initial release. The album spent four non-consecutive weeks at number one on the Billboard 200 and topped the 2018 Billboard 200 Year-End chart. After Swift acquired the master recordings to her first six studio albums including Reputation, the album re-entered the Billboard 200's top five in May 2025, having last appeared in the top 10 in August 2018. Reputation had sold 2.478 million copies in the United States by January 2024, and it was certified seven-times platinum for surpassing seven million equivalent units in the United States by the Recording Industry Association of America (RIAA) in September 2025.

Reputation sold two million copies worldwide within one week of release. With 4.5 million copies sold in 2017, it became the year's second-best-selling album worldwide (behind Ed Sheeran's ÷). In the English-speaking countries, the album reached number one and was certified eight-times platinum in Canada, six-times platinum in Australia and New Zealand, and triple platinum in the United Kingdom, and it also reached number one in Ireland. In continental Europe, it peaked atop the charts in Austria, Greece, the Netherlands, Norway, Portugal, Spain, and Switzerland. It was certified double platinum in Austria, Denmark, and Poland; and platinum in Belgium, France, Germany, Italy, and Sweden. In Asia–Pacific, Reputation was certified platinum in Singapore and gold in Japan, and it became one of the best-selling digital albums in China with one million copies sold as of September 2019.

== Critical reception ==
Professional ratings
Aggregate scores
Source	Rating
AnyDecentMusic?	6.6/10
Metacritic	71/100
Review scores
Source	Rating
AllMusic	3/5 stars
The A.V. Club	B
The Daily Telegraph	4/5 stars
Entertainment Weekly	B
The Guardian	4/5 stars
NME	4/5 stars
Pitchfork	6.5/10
Q	3/5 stars
Rolling Stone	4/5 stars
Slant Magazine	4/5 stars

Upon its release, Reputation received positive but often polarized reviews from critics. The album earned a weighted average score of 71 out of 100 on Metacritic, based on 28 reported reviews.

Many critics praised Swift's personal lyricism and songwriting depicting vulnerability and intimacy despite the first impressions of a vindictive record. Reviews by Slant Magazine's Sal Cinquemani, McCormick, and Sheffield appreciated Reputation for exploring vulnerable sentiments beneath the surface of fame and celebrity. Petridis found the celebrity-inspired, dramatic themes tiring, but lauded the album as "a masterclass in pop songwriting" about love and romance. The Independent's Roisin O'Connor and Vulture's Craig Jenkins both regarded Reputation as a showcase of Swift's both vindictive and vulnerable sides; the former lauded it for displaying Swift's talents capturing emotional details "that you as a listener cannot". In The A.V. Club, Clayton Purdom appreciated how, despite Swift's embrace of modern styles, her lyrical narrative retains its distinctive romantic nature since her 2008 single, "Love Story".

The production received mixed reviews. In an outright negative review, Geoff Nelson of Consequence gave the album a D+ rating and called it a "bloated, moving disaster". For Nelson, the album found Swift adopting black-music styles and African-American Vernacular English, a "reflection of a wider cultural problem". Some reviewers agreed that Reputation's black-music influences were controversial and a probable case of cultural appropriation, (Note: Attributed to reviews by Kitty Empire for The Observer, Fenwick, and Powers) but Caramanica welcomed them as a sign of Swift embracing modern pop-music trends.

Cinquemani called it a good pop album but found it blemished at times by "tired, repetitive EDM tricks", and Cox lamented how Swift's lyrical craftsmanship was overshadowed by what he deemed a conventional and unoriginal production. The Boston Globe's Terrence Cawley and Billboard's Jason Lipshutz identified some stylistics missteps but said the experiments were worthwhile and made an enjoyable listen. The Associated Press's Meskin Fekadu and Variety's Chris Willman hailed Reputation as an outstanding pop album; the latter lauded the balance between Swift's singer-songwriter lyrical strengths and the "up-to-the-second rhythmic pop" of mainstream music.

== Accolades ==
Reputation featured on several publications' lists of the best albums of 2017, ranking on such lists by Time (fifth), Rolling Stone (seventh), Slant Magazine (17th), The Independent (19), Complex (26th), NME (31st), and Spin (48th). On the mass critics' poll Pazz & Jop coordinated by The Village Voice, the album ranked at number 71 out of the 100 albums voted as the best of 2017. On individual critics' lists, it appeared on those by Sheffield (second), Caramanica (fifth), and Mikael Wood of the Los Angeles Times (unranked). On Slant Magazine's list of the best 2010s-decade album published in 2019, Reputation ranked at number 88.

At industry awards held in 2018, the album won an American Music Award for Favorite Pop/Rock Album, a Billboard Music Award for Top Selling Album, a Libera Award for Independent Impact Album, and a Japan Gold Disc Award for Best 3 Albums (Western). It received nominations including an ARIA Music Award nomination for Best International Artist, a Billboard Music Award nomination for Top Billboard 200 Album, and a Juno Award nomination for International Album of the Year. At the 61st Annual Grammy Awards, Reputation was nominated for Best Pop Vocal Album, with several publications viewing the lack of a nomination for Album of the Year or any other category as being a snub. The album's packaging and design won two awards from the American Advertising Federation.

== Legacy ==
=== Popular culture and politics ===
Released amidst negative press and after Swift's hiatus, Reputation was regarded by several journalists as her comeback. Some critics interpreted the release during the Donald Trump presidency as a political statement—whereas many celebrities voiced their opposition to Trump's controversial policies, Swift's inaction during the 2016 presidential election was highlighted in the press as a shocking phenomenon. Detractors denounced her as aloof and tone-deaf to the contemporary political landscape, with a Guardian editorial dubbing her an "envoy" for Trump's values. The Guardian's Laura Snapes observed Swift's silence, coupled with the celebrity controversies, considerably damaged her status as a "peerless pop princess".

According to Hyden, the album was released amidst a "moral apocalypse" in the entertainment industry, when sexual assault against women was being "re-contextualized in the popular consciousness as expressions of dominance and humiliation". Nonetheless, her inclusion as one of the "Silence Breakers"—a group of six women who publicly spoke out against sexual misconduct—for the cover of Time 2017's People of the Year was criticized by some who disdained her "spineless feminism and political passivity". Some others regarded Reputation as Swift's first commercial disappointment, partly because of its diminished success next to its predecessor, 1989. In defense of Swift, the academic and journalist Jane Martinson said that Swift's disengagement from the press represented her efforts to control the narrative and was an empowering move for young women.

Other opinions observed how the public backlash during promotion of Reputation contributed to Swift's political engagements after 2018; she publicly endorsed political candidates, supported LGBT rights, and criticized systemic racism. The promotional campaign of Reputation, specifically Swift's use of social media, was subject of an academic paper analyzing popular music marketing by Linda Ryan Bengtsson and Jessica Edlom, two media and communications scholars. They argued that Reputation was the "most adequate" release in terms of marketing, driven by fan-oriented social media promotion and Swift's long-standing relationship with her supporters. Her "social media blackout" set a precedent for other pop stars to emulate. Commenting on the album's rollout cycle, the music scholar Jadey O'Regan remarked how Swift used "the art of pop in the best way" for utilizing "the way she's been stereotyped in popular culture". The film director Jennifer Kaytin Robinson cited Reputation as an inspiration for her 2022 teen comedy film Do Revenge.

=== Critical reevaluation ===
Critics have regarded Reputation as an album that stood the test of time. Billboard's Andrew Unterberger wrote in August 2019: "With a couple years' clarity, removed from all the backlash against Swift for her perceived insincerity (and political neutrality), we can now look back on Reputation for what it actually was: a very good pop album that was very successful." Mary Siroky of Consequence stated how time proved it to be an authentic record, contrary to some initial reviews claiming otherwise and, as part of a 2022 piece titled "What Were We Thinking? 15 Times We Were Wrong", opined that the publication's initial review was influenced by Swift's negative press and its score should have been higher. Powers in 2024 described Reputation as an album "once-scorned, now revered", and Caramanica in 2025 regarded it as Swift's riskiest, most shocking, and most inventive album of her career.

Joe Lynch of Billboard attributed the initial criticism to the general preconception disregarding lyrics in synthesizer-based arrangements; "Which is a shame, because on Reputation, Swift's words deliver vivid Polaroid shots directly to your brain." Rolling Stone's Kara Voght said the album was Swift's first to "truly be in conversation with its pop contemporaries" and identified some of its songs as her artistic heights. For some critics, though Reputation is not as accomplished as Swift's other albums, its hip-hop experimentation and detail-heavy songwriting led to her refined craftsmanship on subsequent records, namely Folklore (2020), Evermore (2020), and Midnights (2022). When ranking Swift's 11 albums for The New York Times in 2024, Caramanica ranked Reputation at number one. He contended that the album showcased Swift's "real growth" on a narrative level by owning up her character flaws and expressing vulnerability, even embracing the frailties of fame and celebrity.

== Track listing ==
Reputation track listing
No.	Title	Writer(s)	Producer(s)	Length
1.	"…Ready for It?"	Taylor Swift; Max Martin; Shellback; Ali Payami	Martin; Shellback; Payami	3:28
2.	"End Game" (featuring Ed Sheeran and Future)	Swift; Martin; Shellback; Sheeran; Nayvadius Wilburn	Martin; Shellback; Ilya^{[a]}	4:04
3.	"I Did Something Bad"	Swift; Martin; Shellback	Martin; Shellback	3:58
4.	"Don't Blame Me"	Swift; Martin; Shellback	Martin; Shellback	3:56
5.	"Delicate"	Swift; Martin; Shellback	Martin; Shellback	3:52
6.	"Look What You Made Me Do"	Swift; Jack Antonoff; Richard Fairbrass; Fred Fairbrass; Rob Manzoli	Swift; Antonoff	3:31
7.	"So It Goes..."	Swift; Martin; Shellback; Oscar Görres	Martin; Shellback; Görres	3:47
8.	"Gorgeous"	Swift; Martin; Shellback	Martin; Shellback	3:29
9.	"Getaway Car"	Swift; Antonoff	Swift; Antonoff	3:53
10.	"King of My Heart"	Swift; Martin; Shellback	Martin; Shellback	3:34
11.	"Dancing with Our Hands Tied"	Swift; Martin; Shellback; Oscar Holter	Martin; Shellback; Holter	3:31
12.	"Dress"	Swift; Antonoff	Swift; Antonoff	3:50
13.	"This Is Why We Can't Have Nice Things"	Swift; Antonoff	Swift; Antonoff	3:27
14.	"Call It What You Want"	Swift; Antonoff	Swift; Antonoff	3:23
15.	"New Year's Day"	Swift; Antonoff	Swift; Antonoff	3:55
Total length:				55:45

=== Notes ===
- ^{^[a]} signifies an additional vocal producer.
- "Look What You Made Me Do" contains an interpolation of the 1991 song "I'm Too Sexy" by the band Right Said Fred.

== Personnel ==
- Taylor Swift – vocals, backing vocals (tracks: 1, 4, 10), producer (tracks: 6, 9, 12–15); executive producer; packaging creative design, package direction, creative packaging direction
- Max Martin – producer, keyboards, programming (tracks: 1–5, 7, 8, 10, 11); recording (track 1); piano (tracks: 4, 5); backing vocals (track 4)
- Shellback – producer, keyboards, programming (tracks: 1–5, 7, 8, 10, 11); drums (tracks: 2, 4, 10); bass (tracks: 2, 10); guitars (track 8)
- Ali Payami – producer, keyboards, programming (track 1)
- Jack Antonoff – producer, programming, instruments (tracks: 6, 9, 12–14); backing vocals (tracks: 6, 9, 14); piano, bass, guitar, synths (track 15)
- Oscar Görres – producer, keyboards, programming, piano (track 7)
- Oscar Holter – producer, keyboards, programming (track 11)
- Michael Ilbert – engineer (tracks: 2–5, 7, 8, 10, 11)
- Sam Holland – engineer (tracks: 2–5, 7, 8, 11)
- Laura Sisk – engineer (tracks: 6, 9, 12, 13, 15)
- Noah Passovoy – engineer (track 10)
- Cory Bice – assistant engineer (tracks: 2–5, 7, 10, 11)
- Jeremy Lertola – assistant engineer (tracks: 2, 4, 5, 7, 10, 11)
- Jon Sher – assistant engineer (track 10)
- Ed Sheeran – featured artist (track 2)
- Future – featured artist (track 2)
- Ilya Salmanzadeh – additional vocal production (track 2)
- Seth Ferkins – engineer (track 2)
- Sean Flora – assistant engineer (track 2)
- Peter Karlsson – assistant engineer (track 2)
- Mike Synphony – assistant engineer (track 2)
- Daniel Watson – assistant engineer (track 2)
- Victoria Parker – violins (tracks: 6, 9, 13); viola (track 13)
- Phillip A. Peterson – cellos (tracks: 6, 9, 13)
- Evan Smith – saxophones (track 6)
- James Reynolds – baby voice intro (track 8)
- Sean Hutchinson – drums (track 9)
- Serban Ghenea – mixing
- John Hanes – mix engineer
- Randy Merrill – mastering
- Mert and Marcus – photography
- Mat Maitland – photo creative direction
- Joseph Cassell – wardrobe stylist
- Isamaya Ffrench – makeup
- Lorraine Griffin – manicurist
- Paul Hanlon – hair
- Josh and Bethany Newman – packaging art direction
- Ben Fieker – packaging design
- Parker Foote – packaging design
- Austin Hale – packaging design

== Charts ==
=== Weekly charts ===
2017–2018 weekly chart performance
Chart (2017–2018)	Peak position
Australian Albums (ARIA)	1
Austrian Albums (Ö3 Austria)	1
Belgian Albums (Ultratop Flanders)	1
Belgian Albums (Ultratop Wallonia)	9
Canadian Albums (Billboard)	1
Croatian International Albums (HDU)	2
Czech Albums (ČNS IFPI)	2
Danish Albums (Hitlisten)	3
Dutch Albums (Album Top 100)	1
Finnish Albums (Suomen virallinen lista)	5
French Albums (SNEP)	16
German Albums (Offizielle Top 100)	2
Greek Albums (IFPI)	3
Hungarian Albums (MAHASZ)	8
Irish Albums (IRMA)	1
Italian Albums (FIMI)	3
Japanese Albums (Billboard Japan)	4
Japanese Albums (Oricon)	3
Latvian Albums (LaIPA)	7
Mexican Albums (AMPROFON)	4
New Zealand Albums (RMNZ)	1
Norwegian Albums (VG-lista)	1
Polish Albums (ZPAV)	6
Portuguese Albums (AFP)	1
Scottish Albums (Official Charts)	1
Slovak Albums (ČNS IFPI)	4
South African Albums (RSG)	3
South Korean Albums (Circle)	36
South Korean International Albums (Circle)	3
Spanish Albums (Promusicae)	3
Swedish Albums (Sverigetopplistan)	2
Swiss Albums (Schweizer Hitparade)	1
UK Albums (Official Charts)	1
US Billboard 200	1

2021–2025 weekly chart performance
Chart (2021–2025)	Peak position
Argentine Albums (CAPIF)	1
Greek Albums (IFPI)	1
Lithuanian Albums (AGATA)	20
US Independent Albums (Billboard)	1

=== Monthly chart ===
2022 monthly chart performance
Chart (2022)	Peak position
Uruguayan Albums (CUD)	1

=== Year-end charts ===
2017 year-end chart performance
Chart (2017)	Position
Australian Albums (ARIA)	3
Austrian Albums (Ö3 Austria)	55
Belgian Albums (Ultratop Flanders)	57
Belgian Albums (Ultratop Wallonia)	165
Dutch Albums (Album Top 100)	90
German Albums (Offizielle Top 100)	60
Hungarian Albums (MAHASZ)	95
Japanese Albums (Billboard Japan)	82
Japanese Albums (Oricon)	73
Mexican Albums (AMPROFON)	93
New Zealand Albums (RMNZ)	9
Norwegian Albums (VG-lista)	94
South Korean International Albums (Gaon)	51
Spanish Albums (PROMUSICAE)	43
Swiss Albums (Schweizer Hitparade)	90
UK Albums (OCC)	15

2018 year-end chart performance
Chart (2018)	Position
Australian Albums (ARIA)	11
Belgian Albums (Ultratop Flanders)	77
Canadian Albums (Billboard)	4
Danish Albums (Hitlisten)	87
Estonian Albums (Eesti Ekspress)	35
Irish Albums (IRMA)	16
Japanese Albums (Billboard Japan)	72
Mexican Albums (AMPROFON)	62
New Zealand Albums (RMNZ)	9
South Korean International Albums (Gaon)	84
UK Albums (OCC)	37
US Billboard 200	1

2019 year-end chart performance
Chart (2019)	Position
Australian Albums (ARIA)	27
New Zealand Albums (RMNZ)	45
Spanish Albums (PROMUSICAE)	93
US Billboard 200	74

2020 year-end chart performance
Chart (2020)	Position
Australian Albums (ARIA)	69

2021 year-end chart performance
Chart (2021)	Position
Australian Albums (ARIA)	62
Belgian Albums (Ultratop Flanders)	156
New Zealand Albums (RMNZ)	50
US Billboard 200	170

2022 year-end chart performance
Chart (2022)	Position
Australian Albums (ARIA)	34
UK Albums (OCC)	71
US Billboard 200	108

2023 year-end chart performance
Chart (2023)	Position
Australian Albums (ARIA)	11
Austrian Albums (Ö3 Austria)	19
Belgian Albums (Ultratop Flanders)	28
Belgian Albums (Ultratop Wallonia)	143
Canadian Albums (Billboard)	29
Danish Albums (Hitlisten)	88
Dutch Albums (Album Top 100)	33
German Albums (Offizielle Top 100)	43
Hungarian Albums (MAHASZ)	40
New Zealand Albums (RMNZ)	13
Portuguese Albums (AFP)	85
Swedish Albums (Sverigetopplistan)	93
Swiss Albums (Schweizer Hitparade)	61
UK Albums (OCC)	21
US Billboard 200	21
US Independent Albums (Billboard)	3

2024 year-end chart performance
Chart (2024)	Position
Australian Albums (ARIA)	15
Austrian Albums (Ö3 Austria)	10
Belgian Albums (Ultratop Flanders)	21
Belgian Albums (Ultratop Wallonia)	112
Canadian Albums (Billboard)	25
Danish Albums (Hitlisten)	89
Dutch Albums (Album Top 100)	38
German Albums (Offizielle Top 100)	21
Hungarian Albums (MAHASZ)	53
Portuguese Albums (AFP)	18
Swedish Albums (Sverigetopplistan)	86
Swiss Albums (Schweizer Hitparade)	20
UK Albums (OCC)	27
US Billboard 200	22
US Independent Albums (Billboard)	3

2025 year-end chart performance
Chart (2025)	Position
Australian Albums (ARIA)	43
Austrian Albums (Ö3 Austria)	32
Belgian Albums (Ultratop Flanders)	46
Belgian Albums (Ultratop Wallonia)	172
Canadian Albums (Billboard)	48
German Albums (Offizielle Top 100)	43
Swiss Albums (Schweizer Hitparade)	52
UK Albums (OCC)	54
US Billboard 200	56
US Independent Albums (Billboard)	8

=== Decade-end charts ===
2010–2019 decade-end chart performance
Chart (2010–2019)	Position
Australian Albums (ARIA)	50
US Billboard 200	62

== Certifications ==
Certifications for Reputation
Region	Certification	Certified units/sales
Australia (ARIA)	6× Platinum	420,000^{‡}
Austria (IFPI Austria)	2× Platinum	30,000^{‡}
Belgium (BRMA)	Platinum	20,000^{‡}
Brazil (Pro-Música Brasil)	3× Platinum	120,000^{‡}
Canada (Music Canada)	8× Platinum	640,000^{‡}
Denmark (IFPI Danmark)	2× Platinum	40,000^{‡}
France (SNEP)	Platinum	100,000^{‡}
Germany (BVMI)	Platinum	200,000^{‡}
Italy (FIMI)	Platinum	50,000^{‡}
Japan (RIAJ)	Gold	100,000^{^}
Mexico (AMPROFON)	Platinum	60,000^{‡}
New Zealand (RMNZ)	6× Platinum	90,000^{‡}
Norway (IFPI Norway)	Gold	10,000^{‡}
Poland (ZPAV)	2× Platinum	40,000^{‡}
Portugal (AFP)	Gold	3,500^{‡}
Singapore (RIAS)	Platinum	10,000^{*}
Spain (Promusicae)	Gold	20,000^{‡}
Sweden (GLF)	Platinum	40,000^{‡}
Switzerland (IFPI Switzerland)	Gold	10,000^{‡}
United Kingdom (BPI)	3× Platinum	900,000^{‡}
United States (RIAA)	7× Platinum	7,000,000^{‡}
^{*} Sales figures based on certification alone.^{^} Shipments figures based on certification alone.^{‡} Sales+streaming figures based on certification alone.

== See also ==
- List of Billboard 200 number-one albums of 2017
- List of Billboard 200 number-one albums of 2018
- List of number-one albums of 2017 (Australia)
- List of number-one albums of 2017 (Belgium)
- List of number-one albums of 2017 (Canada)
- List of number-one albums of 2017 (Ireland)
- List of number-one albums of 2018 (Ireland)
- List of number-one albums from the 2010s (New Zealand)
- List of UK Albums Chart number ones of the 2010s § 2017
- List of top 25 albums for 2017 in Australia
- List of top 25 albums for 2018 in Australia
- Lists of fastest-selling albums
- List of best-selling albums in China
- List of best-selling albums by year in the United States
- List of best-selling albums in the United States of the Nielsen SoundScan era
