= Faith (band) =

Swedish doom metal band

- Origin: Sweden
- Genre: Doom metal
- Years active: 1984–present
- Label: Doom Symphony
- Members: Roger Johansson; Christer Nilsson; Peter Svensson
- Website: www.faitharmy.com/cms

Faith is a Swedish doom metal band formed in 1984.

== History ==
Faith was founded in 1984 by Roger Johansson (guitars), Christer Nilsson (bass, vocals) and Peter Svensson (drums), who had always been the stable part of the line-up ever since. But in the beginning the band was a four-piece: another guitarist, named Jörgen Thuresson, was also a member of the group. The band did not want to compose fast music, but to make extremely heavy songs. The first composition were very slow, based on chord-changes, and the lyrics were based on Swedish history and folklore. These first songs were recorded in January 1985, and after several rehearsals the "Faith" demo was recorded and released, even though Jörgen was not present on the recording sessions, since he broke his nose at a graduation party the night before the recording day. During the summer of 1985 Jörgen left the band, and the line-up changed once again since Faith acquired a new singer: Roger Berntsson. With this new line-up the band self-produced its first single: "Hymn of the Sinner", which was released in 1986. After just a few months Roger Berntsson left the band due to family reasons and was replaced by Zenny Hansson, who unfortunately did not remain for a long period of time in the line-up since another band, called "Destiny", made him a rich offer he could not refuse. So Christer took once again the vocals, along with the bass lines. With the classic line-up, the band produced another demo, called Insanity. Around the beginning of 1987 guitarist Peter Zweiniger joined the band, which prepared some covers and played them live among the band's own pieces in a series of concerts around Sweden. Faith also went east and made a tour in Finland. Peter Svensson moved to Gothenburg, while Roger and Christer stayed in their hometown of Karlshamn. So the band was put on hold by all of the three members, who pursued other personal projects. But in 1995, when Peter returned in Karlshamn, the three got together once again and recorded another demo, called In the Twelfth Hour. Family and work situation again made the band to put it all on hold shortly after the recording of the new demo. For the second time a long period of time passed before Faith was resurrected. In winter of 2002 the members wanted to quit the project they were in at that point and had a desire of playing together once again, so Faith became once again an active band. So old songs were dusted off, rearranged and during summer 2003 the band entered the Soundpalace Studio for a recording session. The result of this session was the band's first full-length album, Salvation Lies Within, which was self-released by the band on vinyl and later re-released on CD in 2005 on Doom Symphony Records. In August 2003 Faith did their first gig in over 16 years at the Rockslagsfestivalen, a local festival. In early 2004 the band signed a deal with the Italian label Underground Symphony, which put the band under its subdivision Doom Symphony. After more recording sessions, the band released a new full-length album in 2005: Sorg.

In 2013, the band released a new album entitled Decades Of Despair, with the song 'Hollow' surfacing as a sample.

== Members ==
=== Current members ===
- Roger Johansson – guitars
- Christer Nilsson – bass, vocals
- Peter Svensson – drums

=== Past members ===
- Jörgen Thuresson – guitars
- Roger Berntsson – vocals
- Zenny Hansson – vocals
- Peter Zweiniger – guitars

== Discography ==
=== Albums ===
- Salvation Lies Within (2003)
- Sorg (2005)
- Blessed? (2008)
- Decades Of Despair (2013)

=== Singles ===
- "Hymn of the Sinner" (1986)

=== Demos ===
- Faith (1985)
- Insanity (1986)
- In the Twelfth Hour (1995)
