= King of My Heart =

2017 song by Taylor Swift

Song by Taylor Swift

from the album Reputation
- Released: November 10, 2017
- Studio: MXM (Los Angeles); MXM (Stockholm); Conway Recording (Los Angeles)
- Genre: Electropop; EDM
- Length: 3:34
- Label: Big Machine
- Songwriters: Taylor Swift; Max Martin; Shellback
- Producers: Max Martin; Shellback

Audio video
- "King of My Heart" on YouTube

"King of My Heart" is a song by the American singer-songwriter Taylor Swift from her sixth studio album, Reputation (2017). She wrote the song with its producers, Max Martin and Shellback. An electropop and EDM track, "King of My Heart" incorporates pounding drum machines, pulsing synths, and vocals manipulated by a vocoder. The lyrics are about infatuation and devotion: the narrator proclaims herself as an "American queen" and her lover as the king to her heart, body, and soul.

Several reviews deemed the production catchy and engaging, but others found the song underwhelming or unmemorable. The track received certifications in Australia, New Zealand, and the United Kingdom. Swift performed "King of My Heart" live on her 2018 Reputation Stadium Tour, where the performance was accompanied by dancers playing large drums. She also sang it three times on the Eras Tour in 2023 and 2024.

== Background and release ==
Taylor Swift's fifth studio album, 1989 (2014), was a commercial success that transformed her image from a country music artist to a global pop icon. Her heightened fame was accompanied by increasing tabloid gossip; her reputation as "America's Sweetheart", a result of her wholesome and innocent image, was blemished from publicized short-lived relationships and disputes with other celebrities, including a dispute with the rapper Kanye West and the media personality Kim Kardashian. Swift went on a hiatus in 2015 and 2016 and conceived her sixth studio album, Reputation, as an answer to the media commotion surrounding her celebrity.

According to Swift, Reputation has two major themes; one is vengeance and drama, and the other about finding love and friendship, which she described as "something sacred throughout all the battle cries". The album was released by Big Machine Records on November 10, 2017; "King of My Heart" is track number 10. Although the song did not chart, it has been certified platinum in Australia, gold in New Zealand, and silver in the United Kingdom.

On August 4, 2025, in a podcast interview, the music video director Joseph Kahn, who directed the music videos for Reputation's singles, revealed that "King of My Heart" was scheduled to be the second single and that an official music video was recorded. However, it was never completed due to Swift's decision to focus on "...Ready for It?". Kahn described the video as very "conceptual" and was mainly VFX.

== Music and lyrics ==
Swift wrote "King of My Heart" with the producers Max Martin and Shellback, who both programmed the track and played keyboards on it. Shellback also played drums and bass. The song was engineered by Sam Holland and Michael Ilbert at MXM Studios in Los Angeles and Stockholm, and by Noah Passovoy at Conway Recording Studios in Los Angeles. "King of My Heart" was mixed by Serban Ghenea at MixStar Studios in Virginia Beach.

"King of My Heart"
The refrain of "King of My Heart" features Swift's vocals manipulated by a vocoder and heavy drums.

Swift initially wrote the song on acoustic guitar, following the chord progression of F#–C#–A♭m–B. The studio version was recorded in three tones higher to accompany Swift's chest voice, following the chord progression C–G–Dm–F. Set in a tempo of 110 beats per minute, "King of My Heart" is a 1980s-inspired electropop and EDM track. The production consists of pounding, programmed drum machines, snares, bass drums, and hi-hats that create trap and hip-hop beats, surging synths and keyboards, and vocals manipulated with a vocoder, most heavily in the refrains—an effect that Ann Powers of NPR attributed to the influences of rappers and R&B artists. Luiza Lodder of No Ripcord wrote that the manipulated vocal harmonies create a "robotic breakdown", while the music critic Annie Zaleski described the vocal effects as melodic and "pristine [like] a church choir". At the beginning of the second refrain, the song's mix incorporates subdued acoustic guitars, played by Shellback.

"King of My Heart" is a love song that addresses both lust and wholesome romance. It sees Swift's narrator declaring herself as an "American queen" and that her lover is the king to her heart, body, and soul. Although initially detached and affirming that she is "perfectly fine" and "lives on [her] own", she details how her love interest is drawn to her as if she were "a Motown beat", deems him superior to other men who have luxury cars like Range Rover or Jaguar (Swift pronounces Jaguar using a British English accent), and says that no other man has satisfied her like he does. Wanting to keep this blossoming relationship private, the narrator contemplates on its healing power: "Is this the end of all the endings?/ My broken bones are mending with all these nights we're spending."

Swift was inspired by the romance of Khal Drogo and Daenerys Targaryen in the fantasy series Game of Thrones while writing "King of My Heart". She described the pounding drums in the post-chorus as sounding like "Dothraki drums". Behind the lyrics, she said that she structured the verses and refrains of "King of My Heart" so that each section represents a phase of a relationship's progress: "I wanted [the phases] to have their own identity, but seem like they were getting deeper and more fast-paced as the song went on."

== Critical reception ==
Reception of "King of My Heart" was somewhat mixed to positive. Several reviews, including those by the Associated Press, the Tallahassee Democrat, and The Guardian, complimented its production and melody as catchy and engaging. Cleveland.com's Troy L. Smith considered it a brilliant homage to 1980s music, naming Phil Collins's "Take Me Home" (1985) as an influence for the drums. Dan DeLuca of The Philadelphia Inquirer wrote that "King of My Heart" was one of the Reputation tracks that "bring Swift's melodic gifts to bear, and nicely balance out the more self-consciously edgy tracks". In a review for The Music, Uppy Chatterjee praised the huge-sounding drums, vocal effects, and "crisp" EDM production as interesting and having character, resulting in "the best showcase of [Swift's] darker sound". Allaire Nuss of Entertainment Weekly thought that the song was successful in experimenting with styles that were new for Swift's music, bringing forth a "compelling" and "lavish catharsis".

In 2024, two editors of The A.V. Club selected the song among Swift's 22 most underrated. Mary Kate Carr thought that the lyrics contained references to British English jargons and Swift's country beginnings, and she lauded the song for being "both highly specific and also an instant earworm". Paste's Jane Song deemed the lyrics mentioning luxury Range Rover and Jaguar cars "enjoyable" as they showcased Swift's disinterest in caring about if her suitors made more money than her. For Will Hodgkinson of The Times, "King of My Heart" is one of the album tracks that embody themes of togetherness and wholesome romance, which makes the album convincing.

Several reviews thought otherwise that the production was unmemorable or gimmicky. Hannah Mylrea of NME thought that the lyrics contained a "soppiness" and the "jittery instrumentation" turned out dated, an idea corroborated by Eleanor Graham of The Line of Best Fit, who contended that the EDM production was unoriginal amidst a saturated influx of similar production styles in the market. Entertainment.ie considered the track a filler, and Carl Wilson from Slate described it as "dreary-from-the-title-down". The Independent's Roisin O'Connor thought that "King of My Heart" was the least effective love song on Reputation, but its "juddery beat" and Swift's vocals "have a certain je ne sais quoi". In a critical review, Annie Galvin of PopMatters panned "King of My Heart" as the album's worst song, writing that its lyrics mentioning Swift's claiming herself as an "American queen" like "a Motown beat" embrace African American stereotypes and showcase Swift's "ignorance of racial appropriation".

== Live performances ==
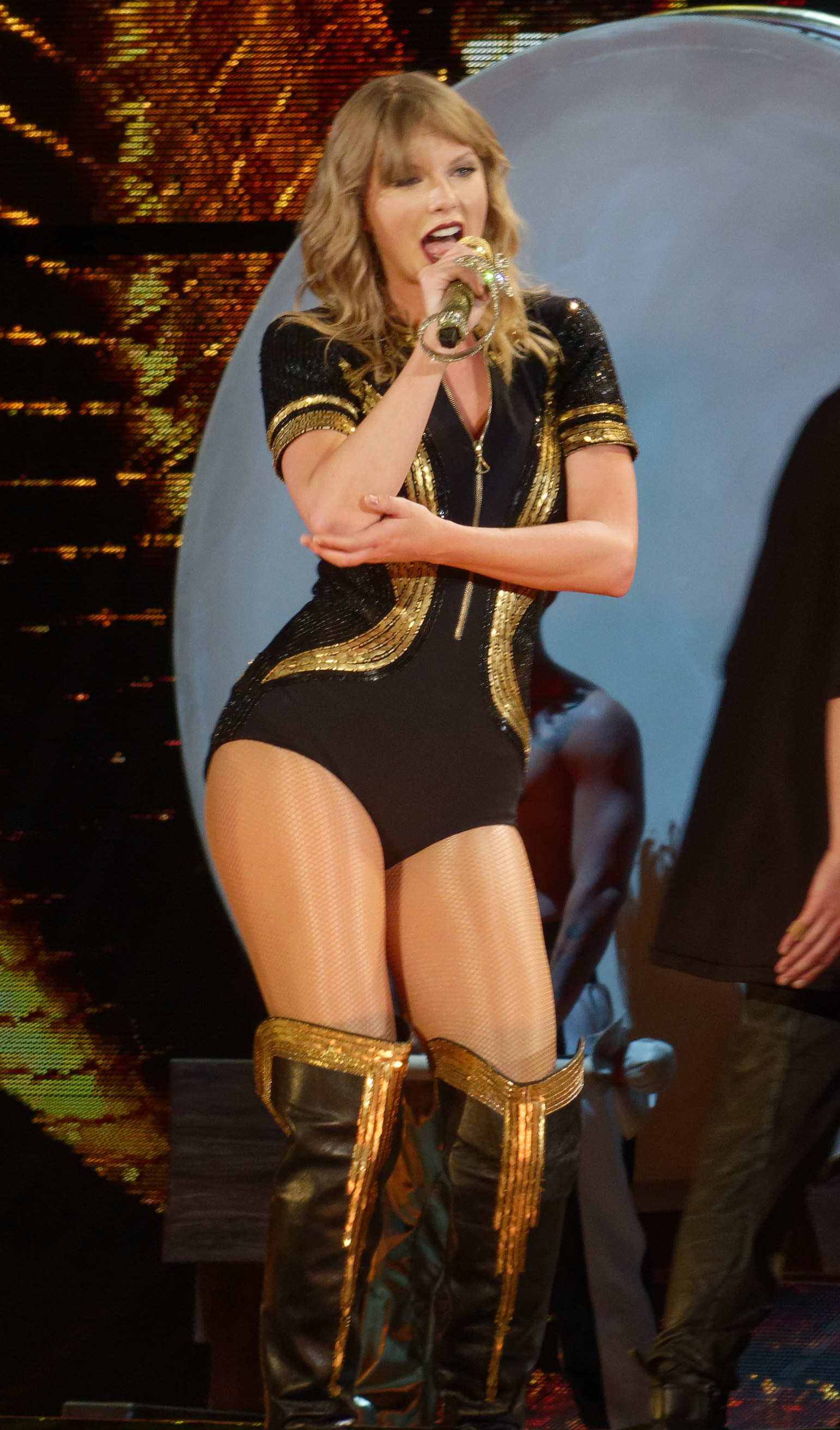
Swift performing "King of My Heart" on her Reputation Stadium Tour in 2018

Swift performed "King of My Heart" live on the Reputation Stadium Tour in 2018. The number was accompanied by a golden throne decoration in the background, six shirtless dancers banging huge tribal drums, video screens showing slithering snakes, and a giant inflatable cobra.

Several publications highlighted the aesthetics and stage of the performance as maximalist and theatric. Billboard reflected that the performance of "King of My Heart" was given a "monster treatment" and became a live highlight. Annie Galvin of PopMatters was critical of the performance, deeming it a representation of "racial appropriation" of black music tropes and dancers without exploring deeper connotations. Chris DeVille of Stereogum opined that Swift could have "cool[ed] it" with the number and performed her older hits instead.

On the Eras Tour, Swift performed "King of My Heart" live as a "surprise song" three times. She first performed it on piano at the August 8, 2023, show in Los Angeles. Slant Magazine opined that the performance showed that the song "has aged well" and described the number as a "fan favorite" from Reputation. She sang "King of My Heart" again on piano at the May 30, 2024, concert in Madrid, Spain, and as part of a piano mashup with "The Alchemy" (2024) at the August 15, 2024, concert in London, England.

== Personnel ==
Credits are adapted from the liner notes of Reputation.

- Taylor Swift – lead vocals, backing vocals, songwriting
- Max Martin – production, programming, songwriting, keyboards
- Shellback – production, songwriting, programming, keyboards, drums, bass
- Sam Holland – engineering
- Michael Ilbert – engineering
- Noah Passovoy – engineering
- Cory Bice – assistant engineering
- Jeremy Lertola – assistant engineering
- Jon Sher – assistant engineering
- Serban Ghenea – mixing
- John Hanes – mix engineering
- Randy Merrill – mastering

== Certifications ==
Certifications for "King of My Heart"
Region	Certification	Certified units/sales
Australia (ARIA)	Platinum	70,000^{‡}
New Zealand (RMNZ)	Gold	15,000^{‡}
United Kingdom (BPI)	Silver	200,000^{‡}
^{‡} Sales+streaming figures based on certification alone.
