= Jeanette Biedermann discography =

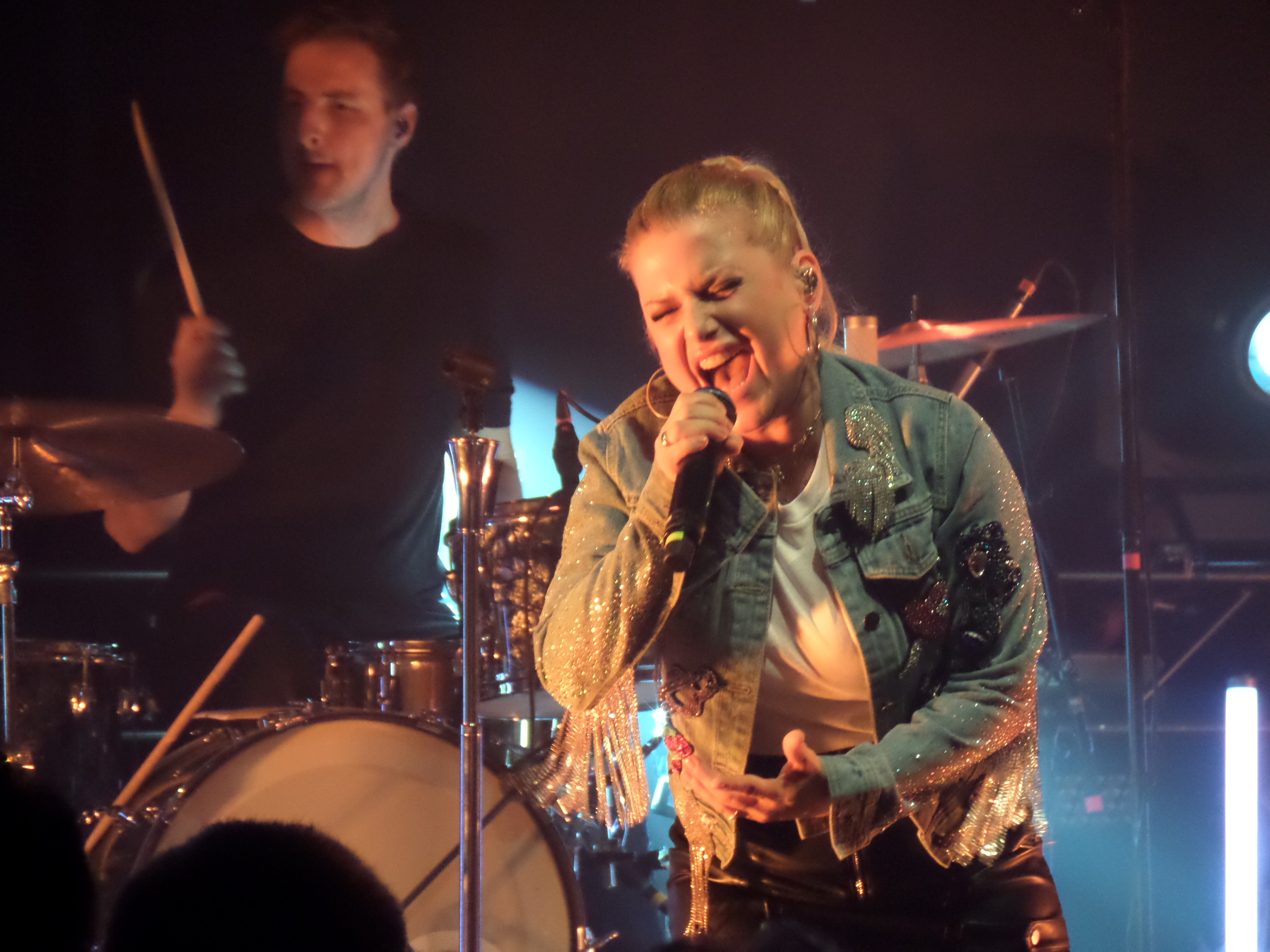
- Biedermann on tour, 2020
- Studio albums: 8
- Singles: 24
- Video albums: 4
- Music videos: 21

German actress and recording artist Jeanette Biedermann began her professional music career in 1998. Her discography, as a solo artist, includes sixth regular studio albums, a holiday album, twenty-one singles and four DVD albums, which she released on Universal Music and her former label Polydor Records.

Biedermann began her music career in 1999 with the German-language single "Das tut unheimlich weh" following her win at the Bild-Schlagerwettbewerb competition in 1998. The song served as her official entry at the German pre-selection show for the Eurovision Song Contest 1999, where it ended fourth. However, the single failed to chart or sell noticeably afterwards. In 2001, she released her first full English-language album Enjoy!, which contained influences of europop and dance-pop music. While the album itself became a moderate commercial success, it spawned her top ten single "Go Back," which was certified gold in Germany. The following year, Biedermann's second album Delicious was released. It entered the top 20 of the charts and received a gold certification by the IFPI. Leading single "How It's Go to Be," which featured prominent portions of Tchaikovsky's ballet Swan Lake, became her second top ten entry and another gold-seller. Other singles released from the album include "No More Tears" and "Sunny Day."

Biedermann's more pop rock-oriented third studio album, Rock My Life, which began a marked shift in the sound of her music, was released in 2002 and became her biggest success yet, with both the album and its same-titled leading single going gold in Germany. Altogether it produced four singles, including "It's Over Now", "Right Now" and a duet with Ronan Keating, "We've Got Tonight," a cover version of Bob Seger's 1978 hit. All singles managed to reach the top ten of the domestic charts. Rock My Life was eventually outperformed by her fourth effort Break on Through (2003), Biedermann's first album with Universal Music following her departure from Polydor Records the same year. It became her first album to debut within the top ten of the Austrian and Swiss Albums Chart and received a platinum certification by the IFPI the following year. Spawning a total of four singles, including top five hit "Rockin' on Heaven's Floor," the album was reissued with additional songs in 2004.

In 2005, Biedermann collaborated with Electronic Arts on her single "Run with Me," which was used as a promotional track for the computer game The Sims and won her another ECHO Award for Best Video – National. The song appeared as a bonus track on her fifth regular album, Naked Truth (2006), which took her work further into the rock genre and, although less successful commercially than her previous release, still reached the top 20 of the German Albums Chart. From all three singles that were released from the album, "Bad Girls Club" became the only top 20 entry. Following a longer hiatus, Biedermann returned to music with her sixth album Undress to the Beat, which incorporated aspects of electropop and synthpop, in 2009. While the album was met with mixed reviews and moderate sales, its same-titled lead single became the singer's first top ten hit in five years. In 2019, Biedermann released DNA, her first solo album in a decade. Her first record to be entirely recorded in German language, it reached the top ten of the German Albums Chart.

== Albums ==
=== Studio albums ===
List of albums, with selected chart positions, sales figures and certifications
Title	Album details	Peak chart positions			Certifications
Title	Album details	GER	AUT	SWI	Certifications
Enjoy!	Released: November 13, 2000; Formats: CD, digital download; Label: Polydor	39	—	67	
Delicious	Released: November 12, 2001; Formats: CD, digital download; Label: Polydor	16	70	60	GER: Gold
Rock My Life	Released: November 25, 2002; Formats: CD, digital download; Label: Polydor	7	28	75	GER: Gold
Break on Through	Released: November 3, 2003; Formats: CD, digital download; Label: Kuba Music, Universal	6	7	10	AUT: Gold; GER: Platinum
Merry Christmas	Released: November 29, 2004; Formats: CD, digital download; Label: Kuba Music	22	43	—	
Naked Truth	Released: April 7, 2006; Formats: CD, digital download; Label: Kuba Music, Universal	14	44	55	
Undress to the Beat	Released: March 20, 2009; Formats: CD, digital download; Label: One Two, Universal	13	27	41	
DNA	Released: 20 September 2019; Formats: CD, digital download; Label: Columbia	8	30	31	
"—" denotes items which were not released in that country or failed to chart.

== Singles ==
List of singles, with selected chart positions and certifications, showing year released and album name
Title	Year	Peak chart positions			Certifications	Album
Title	Year	GER	AUT	SWI	Certifications	Album
"Das tut unheimlich weh"	1999	—	—	—		non-album release
"Go Back"	2000	8	59	16	GER: Gold	Enjoy!
"Will You Be There"	2001	28	49	73		Enjoy!
"How It's Got to Be"	2001	7	22	22	GER: Gold	Delicious
"No More Tears"	2002	9	15	43		Delicious
"Sunny Day"	2002	12	33	87		Delicious
"Rock My Life"	2002	3	6	37	GER: Gold	Rock My Life
"We've Got Tonight" (with Ronan Keating)	2002	7	6	25	GER: Gold	Rock My Life
"It's Over Now"	2003	6	18	63		Rock My Life
"Right Now"	2003	4	11	45		Rock My Life
"Rockin' on Heaven's Floor"	2003	3	6	6		Break on Through
"No Eternity"	2004	9	40	43		Break on Through
"Hold the Line"	2004	11	27	—		Break on Through
"Run with Me"	2004	3	14	24		Naked Truth
"The Infant Light"	2004	11	—	59		Merry Christmas
"Bad Girls Club"	2005	20	67	35		Naked Truth
"Endless Love"	2006	22	51	76		Naked Truth
"Heat of the Summer"	2006	50	—	—		Naked Truth
"Undress to the Beat"	2009	6	20	94		Undress to the Beat
"Material Boy (Don't Look Back)"	2009	43	69	—		Undress to the Beat
"Solitary Rose"	2009	15	16	59		Undress to the Beat
"Wie ein offenes Buch"	2019	—	—	—		DNA
"Deine Geschichten"	2019	—	—	—		DNA
"In den 90ern"	2019	—	—	—		DNA
"Besser mit Dir"	2019	—	—	—		DNA
"10.000 Fragen"	2020	—	—	—		non-album release
"The Book of Love"	2021	—	—	—		non-album release
"Weil du lachst"	2021	—	—	—		non-album release
"—" denotes items which were not released in that country or failed to chart.

== Album appearances ==
Song	Year	Artist(s)	Album
"Mein kleiner Prinz"	1999	Kristina Bach, Jeanette	Tausend kleine Winterfeuer
"Immer noch"	2000	Jeanette	GZSZ 22 - Happy Times
"Er gehört zu mir"	2001	Jeanette	Fetenhits - Disco-Schlager
"We've Got Tonight"	2002	Ronan Keating, Jeanette	Destination
"You Shook Me All Night Long"	2014	Andreas Gabalier, Jeanette	Home Sweet Home

== Videography ==
=== DVDs ===
List of DVD releases with relevant details
Title	Album details
Delicious Live	Released: March 31, 2003; Label: Universal; Format: DVD
Rock My Life Tour 2003	Released: December 1, 2003; Label: Universal; Format: DVD
Break on Through Tour 2004	Released: July 12, 2004; Label: Universal; Format: DVD
Naked Truth – Live at Bad Girls Club	Released: August 18, 2006; Label: Universal; Format: DVD

=== Music videos ===
Year	Title	Director
2000	"Go Back"	Oliver Sommer
2001	"Will You Be There"	Erste Liebe
2001	"How It's Got to Be"	Oliver Sommer
2002	"No More Tears"	Oliver Sommer
2002	"Sunny Day"	Oliver Sommer
2002	"Rock My Life"	Oliver Sommer
2002	"We've Got Tonight"	Oliver Sommer
2003	"It's Over Now"	Oliver Sommer
2003	"Right Now"	Sandra Marschner
2003	"Right Now" (DTM version)	Jörn Heitmann
2003	"Rockin' on Heaven's Floor"	Jörn Heitmann
2004	"No Eternity"	Jörn Heitmann
2004	"Hold the Line"	Oliver Sommer
2004	"Run with Me"	Oliver Sommer
2004	"The Infant Light"	Oliver Sommer
2005	"Bad Girls Club"	Jörn Heitmann
2006	"Endless love"	Sandra Marschner
2006	"Heat of the Summer"	Sandra Marschner
2009	"Undress to the Beat"	Katja Kuhl
2009	"Material Boy (Don't Look Back)"	Katja Kuhl
2009	"Solitary Rose"	Nikolaj Georgiew
