= Rock My Life (song) =

Single by Jeanette

from the album Rock My Life
- Released: October 14, 2002
- Length: 3:56
- Label: Polydor; Universal
- Songwriters: Frank Johnes; Bodybrain; Wonderbra
- Producers: Frank Johnes; Tom Remm

Jeanette singles chronology
"Sunny Day" (2002)	"Rock My Life" (2002)	"We've Got Tonight" (2002)

"Rock My Life" is a song by the German singer Jeanette. It was written by Frank Johnes, Holger "Bodybrain" Kurschat, and Kristina "Wonderbra" Bach and produced by Johnes and Tom Remm for her third album, Rock My Life (2002). The song was released as the album's lead single on 14 October 2002, in German-speaking Europe. Her highest-peaking single to date, it reached number three in Germany and peaked at number six in Austria and Switzerland, respectively. "Rock My Life" was certified gold by the Bundesverband Musikindustrie (BVMI).

== Track listings ==
Maxi single
No.	Title	Writer(s)	Producer(s)	Length
1.	"Rock My Life" (radio edit)	Frank Johnes; Holger "Bodybrain" Kurschat; Kristina "Wonderbra" Bach	Johnes; Tom Remm	3:55
2.	"Rock My Life" (rock version)	Johnes; Kurschat; Bach	Johnes; Tom Remm	4:55
3.	"Rock My Life" (Instrumental)	Johnes; Kurschat; Bach	Johnes; Tom Remm	3:55
4.	"Jeanette the Hit Edit"			4:13
5.	"Rock My Life" (music video) (out-takes)

Notes

- "Jeanette the Hit Edit" contains "How It's Got to Be", "Go Back", "No More Tears" and "Sunny Day."

== Charts ==
=== Weekly charts ===
Weekly chart performance for "Rock My Life"
Chart (2002)	Peak position
Austria (Ö3 Austria Top 40)	6
Germany (GfK)	3
Poland Airplay (Music & Media)	2
Poland (Polish Airplay Chart)	2
Romania (Romanian Top 100)	8
Switzerland (Schweizer Hitparade)	37

=== Year-end charts ===
Year-end chart performance for "Rock My Life"
Chart (2002)	Position
Germany (Media Control)	38
Romania (Romanian Top 100)	22

== Certifications and sales ==
Certifications for "Rock My Life"
Region	Certification	Certified units/sales
Germany (BVMI)	Gold	250,000^{^}
^{^} Shipments figures based on certification alone.
