= Undress to the Beat =

Studio album by Jeanette
- Released: March 20, 2009
- Length: 46:56
- Labels: One Two; Universal
- Producers: Anders Wollbeck; Axwell; Fransisca Balke; Carl Falk; Johan Bobäck; Rob Davis; Forty4S; King of Sweden; Paul Longland; Remee; Harry Sommerdahl; Vacuum; Peter Wright

Jeanette chronology
Naked Truth (2006)	Undress to the Beat (2009)	DNA (2019)

Singles from Undress to the Beat
- 1. "Undress to the Beat" Released: 27 February 2009; 2. "Material Boy (Don't Look Back)" Released: 29 May 2009; 3. "Solitary Rose" Released: 30 October 2009

Undress to the Beat is the seventh studio album by German pop singer Jeanette. It was released by Universal Records on 20 March 2009 in German-speaking Europe. A breakaway from the rock pop genre that primarily defined her music from 2002's Rock My Life onwards, the album saw Jeanette collaborating with a variety of international musicians, including Axwell, Carl Falk, Johan Bobäck, Remee, and Vacuum, who helped steer her sound further into the dance pop and electro pop genre.

The project earned largely mixed reviews from music critics who commended her for her bold shift in direction, while some felt the music relied too heavily on well-known influences. Undress to the Beat debuted and peaked at number 13 on the German Albums Chart, becoming Jeanette's highest-charting album since 2003's Break On Through in Austria, Germany, and Switzerland. A limited deluxe edition of the album was also released on 20 March 2009, with bonus remixes and songs.

== Background ==
In April 2006, Jeanette released her sixth studio album Naked Truth. Taking her work further into the rock pop genre that primarily defined her music from 2002's Rock My Life onwards, the album became her lowest-charting project by then. With her next album, the singer aimed to shift her musical style toward electronic music and dance pop. Songs for the album were written and produced by various changing authors and producers. Jeanette herself was involved in the writing process of three songs, telling Westdeutsche Allgemeine Zeitung about her breakaway in sound: "I believe an album should always be a reflection of its time — and that's why all my albums sound different. When I write songs, they always reflect my current life situation. And that's different with every album."

== Promotion ==
The album's lead single, "Undress to the Beat", co-written and produced by Johan Bobäck, was released on 27 February 2009. The song reached number six on the German Singles Chart and number twenty on the Austrian Singles Chart, becoming her first top ten hit since 2004's "Run with Me." Undress to the Beat's second single, "Material Boy (Don't Look Back)," produced by Vacuum, was released three months later on 29 May 2009. Less successful, it reached number forty-three on the German Singles Chart and number sixty-nine on the Austrian Singles Chart. Third and final single, "Solitary Rose," co-written by Biedermann and produced by Carl Falk, was released on 30 October 2009. The song premiered on her TV series, the Sat.1 telenovela Anna und die Liebe, and peaked at number 15 in Germany.

== Critical reception ==
Professional ratings
Review scores
Source	Rating
CDStarts.de	4/10
LetMeEntertainYou.de	3/5 marks
MusicHeadQuarter.de	2/10

Undress to the Beat received generally mixed to negative reviews from pop music critics. Computer Bild called the project a "decent pop album. There's not much more or less to say than that the 28-year-old plays her new electropop role professionally and comes across convincingly. After all, the rock chick persona of earlier days was never all that believable." Similarly, Jan Gebauer from Queer.de wrote: "A bit of Lady Gaga here, a touch of Rihanna there, and of course plenty of Madonna and Kylie. Sure, they all do it quite a bit better than Jeanette, but thanks to the experienced, fresh producers, Jeanette's album is still highly entertaining. And let’s be honest — the disco diva role suits her way more than the tough rocker chick persona." Beatblogger.de felt that the "album packs a punch. While the rock elements that defined Naked Truth still flash through here and there, Undress to the Beat feels far more danceable — and clearly geared toward commercial success. You can definitely imagine a hit or two coming from it." The editorial staff of the website noted that the new album was" "more cohesive: edgy electro-pop meets a couple of slower, more ballad-like tracks. Her versatility is fascinating and will no doubt spark new debate."

LetMeEntertainYou.de described the album as unoriginal, citing its similarities to recent efforts by Britney Spears and Madonna, and concluded: "You'll be searching in vain for originality on Undress to the Beat. But punchy beats and a similarly scantily clad blonde at least make for some light, short-lived entertainment." In a review for CDStarts.de, Matthias Reichel wrote that the album was an effort to capitalize on the chart success of Kylie Minogue and Lady Gaga by adopting their dance-pop musical style. Furthermore, Reichel called the album unconvincing, rating it four out of ten. Sascha Knapek, writing for MusicHeadQuarter.de, found: "Slick and perfectly suited for any preschool party, the little bundle of energy presents her full range of skills on Undress To The Beat. The songs are clearly meant to be sexy and intensely feminine – a goal that backfires spectacularly. Vocally, there’s not much going on, the lyrics rehash what this genre has been recycling for the past 15 years, and the beats are about as original as a bouquet of red roses on Valentine's Day."

== Commercial performance ==
Undress to the Beat debuted and peaked at number 13 on the German Albums Chart. It marked Jeanette's highest-charting album since Break On Through (2003). It also reached number 27 on the Austrian Albums Chart and number 41 on the Swiss Albums Chart, also becoming her biggest-selling album since Break on Through in Austria and Switzerland, respectively.

== Track listing ==
Undress to the Beat track listing
No.	Title	Writer(s)	Producer(s)	Length
1.	"No Rules"	Grant Black; Kyösti Salokorpi; Joel Melasniemi	King of Sweden	3:22
2.	"Undress to the Beat"	Johan Bobäck; Christian Fast; Marica Lindé; Måns Ek	Bobäck	3:47
3.	"Chasing a Thrill"	Fransisca Balke; Peter Wright; Rob Davis	King of Sweden	3:31
4.	"Teach Me How to Say Goodbye"	Carl Sturken; Evan Rogers	Vacuum	3:49
5.	"Wild at That"	Anders Wollbeck; Daniel Presley; Mattias Lindblom	Vacuum	3:17
6.	"Feline"	Balke; Paul Longland; Wright; Davis	Balke; Longland; Wright; Davis	3:30
7.	"Solitary Rose"	Biedermann; AJ Junior; Carl Falk	Falk	3:02
8.	"Freak Out"	Jimmy Harry; Lyrica Anderson; Tony Kanal	Harry Sommerdahl	3:50
9.	"In or Out"	Biedermann; Junior; Falk	Falk	3:37
10.	"I Feel Love"	Axel Hedfors; George Nakas; Klaswahl; Rogerolsson; Shridar Solanki	Axwell; Forty4S	4:07
11.	"Material Boy (Don't Look Back)"	Remee; Thomas Troelsen	Vacuum	4:20
12.	"This Love"	Georgie Dennis; Sean Creasey	Harry Sommerdahl; King of Sweden	3:12
13.	"All Mine"	Anne Judith Wik; Nermin Harambasic; Robin Jenssen; Ronny Svendsen	Vacuum	3:31

Deluxe edition bonus tracks
No.	Title	Writer(s)	Producer(s)	Length
14.	"Undress to the Beat" (Eddie Thoneick Dub Remix)	Bobäck; Fast; Lindé; Ek	Bobäck; Eddie Thoneick^{[a]}	5:32
15.	"Undress to the Beat" (Alex Os'kin & Michael Haase Remix)	Bobäck; Fast; Lindé; Ek	Bobäck; Alex Os'kin^{[a]}; Michael Haase^{[a]}	8:41
16.	"Undress to the Beat" (Infrarohd Remix)	Bobäck; Fast; Lindé; Ek	Bobäck; Aiko Rohd^{[a]}	3:49
17.	"Walking Through the Fire"	Biedermann; Jörg Weisselberg	Weisselberg	3:23
18.	"Don't Forget to Say I Love You"	Biedermann; Weisselberg	Weisselberg	4:21

Notes

- ^{^[a]} denotes additional producer(s)

== Charts ==
Weekly chart performance for Undress to the Beat
Chart (2009)	Peak position
Austrian Albums (Ö3 Austria)	27
German Albums (Offizielle Top 100)	13
Swiss Albums (Schweizer Hitparade)	41
