= Manifest (Linda Sundblad album) =

Studio album by Linda Sundblad
- Released: 24 March 2010
- Genre: Pop
- Length: 40 minutes
- Label: King Island Roxystars Recording
- Producers: Linda Sundblad; Johan Bobäck; Fredrik Thomander; Fibes, Oh Fibes!; MachoPsycho; Kleerup; Alexander Kronlund

Linda Sundblad chronology
Oh, My God! (2006)	Manifest (2010)	Öppna ditt hjärta så ska du få (2010)

Manifest is the second studio album by Linda Sundblad. The album was released on 24 March 2010 through King Island Roxystars Recordings.

== Track listing ==
Manifest track listing
No.	Title	Writer(s)	Producer(s)	Length
1.	"Intro (Choice)"	Linda Sundblad; Johan Bobäck	Bobäck; Sundblad^{[c]}	2:34
2.	"Making Out"	Sundblad; Max Martin	Bobäck	3:10
3.	"Let's Dance"	Fredrik Thomander; Bobäck	Bobäck; Thomander	3:11
4.	"It's Alright"	Sundblad; Bobäck	Bobäck; Sundblad^{[c]}	4:01
5.	"Perfect Nobody" (featuring Fibes, Oh Fibes!)	Sundblad; Christian Olsson; Mattias Nilsson	Fibes, Oh Fibes!	3:49
6.	"2 All My Girls"	Sundblad; Alexander Kronlund; Martin	Bobäck	3:24
7.	"Serotonin"	Sundblad; Jonas Sohn; Bobäck	Bobäck; Sundblad^{[c]}	3:39
8.	"Suicide Girl"	Sundblad; Niklas Olovson; Robin Lynch	MachoPsycho	3:01
9.	"Pick Up the Pieces"	Sundblad; Sohn; Bobäck	Bobäck; Sundblad^{[c]}	3:13
10.	"Damage"	Sundblad; Sohn; Bobäck	Bobäck; Sundblad^{[c]}	3:25
11.	"History" (featuring Kleerup)	Sundblad; Andreas Kleerup	Kleerup	4:05
12.	"Feels So Good"	Sundblad; Kronlund	Kronlund	2:50

Notes

- ^{^[c]} signifies a co-producer

== Chart positions ==
Chart (2010)	Peak positions
Sweden	11
