= 1987 (disambiguation) =

1987 was a twentieth century year.

1987 may also refer to:

- 1987 (number), the natural number following 1986 and preceding 1988

== Astronomy ==
- 1987 Kaplan, a main-belt asteroid discovered in 1952
- 1987 YA, a Mars-crossing asteroid discovered on December 18, 1987
- SN 1987A, a supernova first seen in 1987
- NGC 1987, a globular star cluster in the constellation Mensa

== Film and television ==
- 1987 (film), a 2014 French-Canadian film
- 1987: When the Day Comes, a 2017 South Korean film
- "1987" (Our Friends in the North), a 1996 TV episode
- "1987" (Robot Chicken episode)

== Music ==
- 1987 (artist) (born 1987), Swedish pop musician
- 1987 (What the Fuck Is Going On?), an album by the Justified Ancients of Mu Mu
- 1987 (Fibes, Oh Fibes! album), 2009
- 1987 (Naser Mestarihi album), the full-length debut of Qatar-based rock musician Naser Mestarihi
- Whitesnake (album) or 1987, an album by Whitesnake
- "1987" (song), a song by Juan Campodónico
- "1987", a song by Crosses from EP 2
- Nineteen Eighty Seven, a 2005 album by Whitecross

== See also ==
- UN 1987, a UN number indicating a hazardous substance
