= No More Tears (Jeanette song) =

Single by Jeanette

from the album Delicious
- Released: 25 February 2002
- Length: 3:36
- Label: Polydor; Universal
- Songwriters: Jeanette Biedermann; Wonderbra; Frank Johnes; Martin Martinsson
- Producer: Thorsten Brötzmann

Jeanette singles chronology
| "How It's Got to Be" (2001) | "No More Tears" (2002) | "Sunny Day" (2002) |

"No More Tears" is a song by German singer Jeanette Biedermann. It was written by Biedermann along with Frank Johnes, Martin Martinsson, and Kristina "Wonderbra" Bach and produced by Thorsten Brötzmann for the limited edition of her second studio album Delicious (2001). Released as a single in February 2002, the song peaked at number nine on the German Singles Chart, becoming Biedermann's third non-consecutive top-10 hit. It also reached number 15 on the Austrian Singles Chart.

== Music video ==
A music video for "Hold the Line" was directed by Oliver Sommer.

== Track listing ==
Maxi single
| No. | Title | Writer(s) | Producer(s) | Length |
|---|---|---|---|---|
| 1. | "No More Tears" (radio version) | Jeanette Biederman; Kristina "Wonderbra" Bach; Frank Johnes; Martin Martinsson | Thorsten Brötzmann; Werner Becker^{[a]} | 3:36 |
| 2. | "No More Tears" (Degang8 remix) | Biederman; Bach; Johnes; Martinsson | Brötzmann; Becker^{[a]} | 3:36 |
| 3. | "No More Tears" (Aakona radio edit) | Biederman; Bach; Johnes; Martinsson | Brötzmann; Becker^{[a]}; Malte Hagemeister^{[b]}; Nico Gössel^{[b]} | 4:15 |
| 4. | "Cinderella" | Biederman; Bach; Johnes; Martinsson | Frank Johnes; Tom Remm | 3:00 |
| 5. | "Please Stay" | Biederman; Bach; Laszlo Bencker; Leslie Mandoki | Mandoki | 4:05 |

Notes

- ^{^a} signifies co-producer(s)
- ^{^b} signifies remix producer(s)

== Charts ==
=== Weekly charts ===
Weekly chart performance for "No More Tears"
| Chart (2002) | Peak position |
|---|---|
| Austria (Ö3 Austria Top 40) | 15 |
| Germany (GfK) | 9 |
| Switzerland (Schweizer Hitparade) | 43 |

=== Year-end charts ===
Year-end chart performance for "No More Tears"
| Chart (2002) | Position |
|---|---|
| Germany (Media Control) | 59 |
