= Rockin' on Heaven's Floor =

Single by Jeanette

from the album Break On Through
- B-side: "Orient Express"
- Released: 13 October 2003
- Length: 3:24
- Label: Kuba; Polydor; Universal
- Songwriter(s): Frank Johnes; Tom Remm; Bodybrain; Wonderbra
- Producer(s): Frank Johnes; Tom Remm

Jeanette singles chronology
"Right Now" (2003)	"Rockin' on Heaven's Floor" (2003)	"No Eternity" (2004)

"Rockin' on Heaven's Floor" is a song by German recording artist Jeanette. It was written by Frank Johnes, Tom Remm, Bodybrain, and Kristina "Wonderbra" Bach, and produced by Johnes and Remm for her fourth studio album Break On Through (2003). Released as a single in German-speaking Europe in October 2003, the song peaked at number three on the German Singles Chart, while reaching number six in Austria and Switzerland, becoming Jeanette's highest-charting single and only top-10 hit in Switzerland.

== Formats and track listings ==
Maxi single
No.	Title	Length
1.	"Rockin' on Heaven's Floor" (radio mix)	3:22
2.	"Rockin' on Heaven's Floor" (acoustic mix)	3:49
3.	"Rockin' on Heaven's Floor" (extended Rock mix)	4:02
4.	"Rockin' on Heaven's Floor" (instrumental mix)	3:23
5.	"Orient Express"	4:37

== Charts ==
=== Weekly charts ===
Chart (2003)	Peak position
Austria (Ö3 Austria Top 40)	6
Germany (GfK)	3
Switzerland (Schweizer Hitparade)	6

=== Year-end charts ===
Chart (2003)	Position
Austria (Ö3 Austria Top 40)	62
Germany (Media Control GfK)	50
Switzerland (Schweizer Hitparade)	78
