= Sunny Days =

Sunny Days may refer to:

== Music ==
- Sunny Days (group), a South Korean girl group

=== Albums ===
- Sunny Days (album), by Allure, 2001
- Sunny Days, by Dou Wei, 1995
- Sunny Days, or the title song, by Lighthouse, 1972

=== Songs ===
- "Sunny Days" (Jars of Clay song), 2004
- "Sunny Days" (Kid British song), 2009
- "Sunny Days" (Armin van Buuren song), 2017

== Other media ==
- Sunny Days (film), a 2011 Kazakhstani film
- Sunny Days: The Children's Television Revolution That Changed America, a 2020 book by David Kamp
- Sunny Days, a 1976 autobiography by Sunil Gavaskar
- Sunny Days (musical), a 1928 Broadway musical by Jean Schwartz

== See also ==
- Sunny Day (disambiguation)
