= Will You Be There (Jeanette song) =

Single by Jeanette

from the album Enjoy!
- Released: February 12, 2001
- Genre: Pop
- Length: 3:19
- Label: Kuba; Polydor; Universal
- Songwriters: Frank Johnes; Tom Remm; Wonderbra
- Producer: Cobra

Jeanette singles chronology
"Go Back" (2000)	"Will You Be There" (2001)	"How It's Got to Be" (2001)

"Will You Be There" is a song by German recording artist Jeanette. It was written by Frank Johnes, Tom Remm, and Kristina Bach and produced by Cobra for her debut studio album Enjoy! (2000). Released as the album's second single, it reached the top thirty of the German Singles Chart.

== Formats and track listings ==
Maxi single
No.	Title	Length
1.	"Will You Be There" (Radio Edit)	3:10
2.	"Will You Be There" (Latino Radio Edit)	3:00
3.	"Go Back" (Phil Fuldner Mix)	3:39
4.	"Will You Be There" (Guitar Mix)	3:18
5.	"Will You Be There" (Latino Extended Mix)	4:44
6.	"Deep in My Heart"	4:22

== Charts ==
Chart (2001)	Peak position
Austria (Ö3 Austria Top 40)	49
Germany (GfK)	28
Switzerland (Schweizer Hitparade)	73
