= Undress to the Beat (song) =

Single by Jeanette

from the album Undress to the Beat
- Released: 27 February 2009
- Length: 3:47
- Label: One Two; Universal
- Songwriter(s): Johan Bobäck; Christian Fast; Marica Lindé; Mans Ek
- Producer(s): Johan Bobäck

Jeanette singles chronology
"Heat of the Summer" (2006)	"Undress to the Beat" (2009)	"Material Boy (Don't Look Back)" (2009)

"Undress to the Beat" is a song performed by German recording Jeanette Biedermann. It was written by Johan Bobäck, Christian Fast, Marica Lindé and Mans Ek for Biedermann's same-titled seventh studio album (2009), while production on the track was overseen by Bobäck. The song was released by One Two Media as the album's lead single on 27 February 2009 and, after five years, saw Jeanette return to the top ten of the German Singles Chart, peaking at number six.

== Chart performance ==
"Undress to the Beat" debuted at number six on the German Singles Chart in the week of 16 March 2009. It marked Biedermann's highest-charting single and first top ten entry since 2004's "Run with Me." In Austria, the song debuted and peaked at number twenty on the Austrian Singles Chart. It also reached number 24 on the Eurochart Hot 100 Singles chart on 21 March 2009.

== Music video ==
A music video for "Undress to the Beat" was directed by Katja Kuhl and produced by Mutter & Vater Productions.

== Track listings ==
Digital single
No.	Title	Producer(s)	Length
1.	"Undress to the Beat" (single version)	Johan Bobäck	3:46
2.	"Undress to the Beat" (radio version)	Bobäck	3:38
3.	"Undress to the Beat" (Eddie Thoneick remix)	Bobäck; Eddie Thoneick^{[a]}	6:01
4.	"Undress to the Beat" (Banks & Rodriquez remix)	Bobäck; Banks & Rodriquez^{[a]}	4:05

Maxi single
No.	Title	Producer(s)	Length
1.	"Undress to the Beat" (single version)	Bobäck	3:46
2.	"Undress to the Beat" (radio version)	Bobäck	3:38
3.	"Undress to the Beat" (Eddie Thoneick remix)	Bobäck; Eddie Thoneick^{[a]}	6:01
4.	"Undress to the Beat" (Olli Collins & Fred remix)	Bobäck; Fred Portelli^{[a]}; Olli Collins^{[a]}	4:05

Notes

- ^{^a} signifies additional producer(s)

== Personnel ==
Credits lifted from the liner notes of "Undress to the Beat".

- Jeanette Biedermann — vocals
- Johan Bobäck — production, programming, mixing
- Mans Ek — writer
- Christian Fast — writer
- Frank Kretschmer — vocal recording
- Marica Lindé — writer
- RuDee — editing, mastering

== Charts ==
Weekly chart performance for "Undress to the Beat"
Chart (2009)	Peak position
Austria (Ö3 Austria Top 40)	20
Germany (GfK)	6
Switzerland (Schweizer Hitparade)	94
