= Lambretta (disambiguation) =

Lambretta was a brand of motor scooters.

Lambretta may also refer to:

- Lambretta (band), a Swedish rock band
- The Lambrettas, a British mod revival band
- The Lambretta, an Italian term for the football trick called the "rainbow kick"
