= Sunny Day =

Sunny Day may refer to:

== Music ==
=== Albums ===
- Sunny Day, by Coco Lee, 1998
- Sunny Day, by Elizabeth Mitchell, 2010

=== Songs ===
- "Sunny Day" (song), by Book of Love, 1991
- "Sunny Day", by Abandoned Pools from Humanistic
- "Sunny Day", by Akon featuring Wyclef Jean from Freedom
- "Sunny Day", by Allure from Sunny Days
- "Sunny Day", by Deana Carter from The Story of My Life
- "Sunny Day", by Jay Chou from Yeh Hui-mei
- "Sunny Day", by Jeanette
- "Sunny Day", by Miquel Brown from Manpower
- "Sunny Day", by Misia from Marvelous
- "Can You Tell Me How to Get to Sesame Street?", often referred to by its opening line, "Sunny day / Sweepin' the clouds away..."

== Television ==
- Sunny Day (TV series), a children's animated television series
- Sunny Day, a character in the television series Hawaiian Eye

== Programming ==
- Sunny day, the happy path through a program

== See also ==
- Sunny D, a beverage
- Sunny Days (disambiguation)
