= Enjoy! (Jeanette album) =

Studio album by Jeanette
- Released: 13 November 2000
- Genre: Pop
- Length: 44:32
- Label: Polydor; Universal
- Producer: Cobra

Jeanette chronology
Enjoy! (2000)	Delicious (2001)

Singles from Enjoy!
- 1. "Go Back" Released: January 9, 2000; 2. "Will You Be There" Released: December 2, 2001

Enjoy! is the debut album by German pop singer Jeanette Biedermann. It was released by Universal Records on 13 November 2000 in German-speaking Europe where it reached the top forty of the German Albums Chart.

== Track listing ==
All Tracks produced by Cobra.

No.	Title	Writer(s)	Length
1.	"Go Back"	Frank Johnes; Tom Remm; Wonderbra	3:34
2.	"Time Is on My Side"	Johnes; Wonderbra	3:52
3.	"Be in Heaven"	Johnes; Wonderbra	4:02
4.	"Will You Be There"	Johnes; Remm; Wonderbra	3:19
5.	"I Won't Think Twice"	Wonderbra	3:59
6.	"Sex Me Up"	Johnes; Wonderbra	3:22
7.	"Oh Shit, I Love You"	Johnes; Wonderbra	3:49
8.	"Can't Let You Go"	Johnes; Wonderbra	5:22
9.	"Enjoy (Me)"	Johnes; Remm; Wonderbra	2:42
10.	"Take Care"	Johnes; Wonderbra	3:28
11.	"Amazing Grace"	Trad.; Wonderbra	3:20
12.	"She's the Winner"	Johnes; Wonderbra	3:27

== Charts ==
Chart (2000)	Peak position
German Albums (Offizielle Top 100)	39
Swiss Albums (Schweizer Hitparade)	67
