= How It's Got to Be =

2001 single by Jeanette

Single by Jeanette

from the album Delicious
- Released: 1 October 2001
- Length: 3:19
- Label: Polydor; Universal
- Songwriters: Jeanette Biedermann; Wonderbra
- Producer: Cobra

Jeanette singles chronology
"Will You Be There" (2001)	"How It's Got to Be" (2001)	"No More Tears" (2002)

"How It's Got to Be" is a song by German recording artist Jeanette. Built around Russian composer Pyotr Ilyich Tchaikovsky's "Act 2, Scene 10: Moderato" from his ballet Swan Lake (1875–76), it was written by Biedermann and Kristina Bach and produced by Cobra for her second studio album Delicious (2001). Released as the album's first single, it peaked at number seven on the German Singles Chart, reaching gold status. In addition, it peaked at number 22 in both Austria and Switzerland.

== Formats and track listings ==
Maxi single
No.	Title	Length
1.	"How It's Got to Be" (radio edit)	3:13
2.	"No Style!" (radio edit)	3:39
3.	"How It's Got to Be" (Phil Fuldner mix)	3:24
4.	"No Style!" (dance radio edit)	3:38

== Charts ==
=== Weekly charts ===
Chart (2001)	Peak position
Austria (Ö3 Austria Top 40)	22
Germany (GfK)	7
Switzerland (Schweizer Hitparade)	22

=== Year-end charts ===
Chart (2001)	Position
Germany (Media Control)	65

== Certifications and sales ==
Region	Certification	Certified units/sales
Germany (BVMI)	Gold	250,000^{^}
^{^} Shipments figures based on certification alone.
