= Bad Girls Club (song) =

Single by Jeanette

from the album Naked Truth
- Released: 14 October 2005
- Length: 3:23
- Label: Kuba; Universal
- Songwriter(s): Jeanette Biedermann; Jörg Weisselberg
- Producer(s): Steffen Langenfeld; Jörg Weisselberg

Jeanette singles chronology
"The Infant Light" (2004)	"Bad Girls Club" (2005)	"Endless Love" (2006)

"Bad Girls Club" is a pop-rock song performed by German singer Jeanette Biedermann. It was written by Biedermann and Jörg Weisselberg and produced by Weisselberg and Steffen Langenfeld for Jeanette's sixth album Naked Truth (2006). It was released as a single on 14 October 2005 in Germany.

== Music video ==
A music video for "Bad Girls Club" was directed by Joern Heitmann.

== Track listing ==
Digital single
No.	Title	Writer(s)	Producer(s)	Length
1.	"Bad Girls Club" (power version)	Jeanette Biederman; Jörg Weisselberg	Steffen Langenfeld; Weisselberg	3:22
2.	"Bad Girls Club" (power radio version)	Biederman; Weisselberg	Langenfeld; Weisselberg	3:22
3.	"Bad Girls Club" (wild version)	Biederman; Weisselberg	Langenfeld; Weisselberg	3:22
4.	"Bad Girls Club" (instrumental mix)	Biederman; Weisselberg	Langenfeld; Weisselberg	3:22
5.	"Nightmare" (L.A. version)	Biederman; Weisselberg	Langenfeld; Weisselberg	3:00

== Personnel ==
The following people contributed to "Bad Girls Club."

- Jeanette Biedermann – vocals
- Jörg Weisselberg – production, guitars, bass guitar, programming
- Steffen Langenfeld – production, keyboards, programming

== Charts ==
Weekly chart performance for "Bad Girls Club"
Chart (2005)	Peak position
Austria (Ö3 Austria Top 40)	67
Germany (GfK)	20
Switzerland (Schweizer Hitparade)	35
