= Solitary Rose =

Single by Jeanette

from the album Undress to the Beat
- Released: October 30, 2009
- Length: 3:02
- Label: One Two; Universal
- Songwriter(s): AJ Junior; Carl Falk; Jeanette Biedermann
- Producer(s): Carl Falk

Jeanette singles chronology
"Material Boy (Don't Look Back)" (2009)	"Solitary Rose" (2009)	"Wie ein offenes Buch" (2019)

"Solitary Rose" is a song by German recording artist Jeanette Biedermann. It was written by her along with AJ Junior and Carl Falk, and produced by the latter for her seventh studio album Undress to the Beat (2009). Released as the album's third and final single in German-speaking Europe in October 2009, the ballad reached the top twenty of the Austrian and German Singles Charts, becoming the album's highest-charting single in Austria and Switzerland. Highly promoted on Sat.1 telenovela Anna und die Liebe, in which Biedermann starred from 2008 until 2012, it marked her last single as solo artist until 2019.

== Music video ==
A music video for "Solitary Rose" was directed by Nikolaj Georgiew.

== Track listings ==
Digital single
No.	Title	Length
1.	"Solitary Rose" (album version)	3:02
2.	"Solitary Rose" (acoustic version)	3:01

== Personnel ==
Credits lifted from the liner notes of "Solitary Rose".

- Jeanette Biedermann – vocalist, writer
- Carl Falk — guitar, mixing engineer producer, writer
- AJ Junior — writer
- Dea Nordberg — backing vocalist

== Charts ==
Weekly chart performance for "Solitary Rose"
Chart (2009)	Peak position
Austria (Ö3 Austria Top 40)	16
Germany (GfK)	15
Switzerland (Schweizer Hitparade)	59
