= Oh, My God! (Linda Sundblad album) =

Studio album by Linda Sundblad
- Released: 8 November 2006
- Genre: Pop
- Length: 41 minutes
- Label: Bonnier Music Sweden
- Producer: Tobias Karlsson

Linda Sundblad chronology
Oh, My God! (2006)	Manifest (2010)

Oh, My God! is a studio album by Linda Sundblad. It was first released on 8 November 2006, and was her debut album as a solo artist.

== Track listing ==
All tracks produced by Tobias Karlsson. All tracks written by Linda Sundblad and Tobias Karlsson, except where noted.

Oh, My God! track listing
No.	Title	Writer(s)	Length
1.	"Intro"		0:39
2.	"Cheat"		3:33
3.	"Oh Father"		3:32
4.	"Pretty Rebels"	Sundblad; Alex Kronlund; Max Martin; Karlsson	3:01
5.	"Lose You"	Sundblad; Kronlund; Klas Åhlund; Karlsson	3:29
6.	"Back in Time"		3:53
7.	"Who (Q-Boy)"		3:33
8.	"Dirty"		3:37
9.	"Turning On"		3:42
10.	"Beautiful Boys"	Sundblad; Kronlund; Karlsson	3:43
11.	"Keeper"		4:01
12.	"Daisies"		3:39
13.	"Outro"		0:33

== Chart positions ==
Chart (2006–2007)	Peak positions
Sweden	11
