= No Eternity =

Single by Jeanette Biedermann

Single by Jeanette

from the album Break On Through
- Released: 8 March 2004
- Length: 3:39
- Label: Kuba; Polydor; Universal
- Songwriter(s): Frank Johnes; Jeanette Biedermann; Bodybrain; Wonderbra
- Producer(s): Tom Remm; Frank Kretschmer

Jeanette singles chronology
"Rockin' on Heaven's Floor" (2003)	"No Eternity" (2004)	"Hold the Line" (2004)

"No Eternity" is a song by German recording artist Jeanette Biedermann. It was written by Biedermann along with Frank Johnes, Holger "Bodybrain" Kurschat and Kristina "Wonderbra" Bach for her fourth studio album Break On Through (2003), while production was helmed by Tom Remm and Frank Kretschmer. The song was released as a single on 8 March 2004 in Germany.

== Track listing ==
These are the formats and track listings of major single releases of "No Eternity".

CD single
(602498180730; Released 8 March 2004)

1. "No Eternity" – 3:39
2. "No Eternity" (Extended mix) – 3:57
3. "No Eternity" (Karaoke version) – 3:38
4. "Rockin' on Heavens Floor" (Live acoustic version) – 4:20
5. "Mystery" – 3:39

== Personnel ==
Credits lifted from the liner notes of "No Eternity".

- Jeanette Biedermann – vocals
- Frank Kretschmer – production, drums, keyboards
- Tom Remm – production
- Jörg Weisselberg – guitar
- Chris Wirsching, René Schostak – drums, keyboards

== Charts ==
Weekly chart performance for "No Eternity"
Chart (2004)	Peak position
Austria (Ö3 Austria Top 40)	40
Germany (GfK)	9
Switzerland (Schweizer Hitparade)	43
