= Delicious (Jeanette album) =

Studio album by Jeanette
- Released: 12 November 2001
- Genre: Pop
- Label: Polydor; Universal
- Producer: Thorsten Brötzmann; Cobra; Holger Kurschat

Jeanette chronology
Enjoy! (2000)	Delicious (2001)	Rock My Life (2002)

Singles from Enjoy!
- 1. "How It's Got to Be" Released: 2001; 2. "No More Tears" Released: 2002

Delicious is the second studio album by German pop singer Jeanette Biedermann. It was released by Universal Records on 12 November 2001 in German-speaking Europe. In 2002, the album was certified gold by the Bundesverband Musikindustrie (BVMI).

== Track listing ==
Delicious – Standard edition
No.	Title	Writer(s)	Producer(s)	Length
1.	"How It's Got to Be"	Biedermann; Wonderbra	Cobra	3:13
2.	"May Day"	Wonderbra; Mitch Kelly; Frank Johnes; Martin Martinsson	Cobra	3:34
3.	"You Call Me on the Phone"	Wonderbra; Johnes; Martinsson	Cobra	3:52
4.	"Happiness"	Wonderbra; Johnes; Martinsson	Cobra	3:31
5.	"Call Me Jeany"	Wonderbra; Johnes; Tom Remm; Martinsson	Cobra; Holger Kurschat	3:17
6.	"Stop"	Wonderbra; Johnes; Martinsson	Thorsten Brötzmann	3:15
7.	"As Long as We're Young"	Mathias Löffler	Brötzmann	3:30
8.	"No Love"	Wonderbra; Johnes; Martinsson	Brötzmann	3:16
9.	"My Guy"	Wonderbra; Johnes; Remm; Martinsson	Brötzmann	3:09
10.	"Can't Wait"	Wonderbra; Johnes; Martinsson	Cobra	3:06
11.	"Deep in My Heart"	Trad.; Wonderbra	Cobra	4:22
12.	"No Style"	Wonderbra	Cobra	3:20
13.	"Tak'n Your Heart"	Wonderbra; Johnes; Martinsson	Cobra	3:31
14.	"More Than a Feeling"	Bob Parr; Alexander Seidl	Cobra	3:20
15.	"Amazing Grace" (Acapella Version)	Trad.; Wonderbra	Cobra	2:38

Delicious – Limited edition
No.	Title	Writer(s)	Producer(s)	Length
16.	"No More Tears"	Biederman; Wonderbra; Johnes; Martinsson	Brötzmann; Werner Becker	3:36
17.	"No More Tears" (Arkona Remix)	Biederman; Wonderbra; Johnes; Martinsson	Brötzmann; Becker	7:53
18.	"Cinderella"	Biederman; Wonderbra; Johnes; Martinsson	Johnes; Remm	3:00

== Additional information ==
- How It's Got to Be is based on the classic tune Swan Lake by Peter Tchaikovski.
- Deep In My Heart is based on Adagio in G minor by Remo Giazotto.

== Charts ==
Chart (2001)	Peak position
Austrian Albums (Ö3 Austria)	70
German Albums (Offizielle Top 100)	16
Swiss Albums (Schweizer Hitparade)	60

== Certifications ==
Region	Certification	Certified units/sales
Germany (BVMI)	Gold	150,000^{^}
^{^} Shipments figures based on certification alone.
