= Go Back (Jeanette song) =

2000 song by Jeanette Biedermann

Single by Jeanette

from the album Enjoy!
- Released: September 25, 2000
- Recorded: 2000
- Genre: Pop
- Length: 3:24
- Label: Kuba; Polydor; Universal
- Songwriters: Frank Johnes; Tom Remm; Wonderbra
- Producer: Cobra

Jeanette singles chronology
"Go Back" (2000)	"Will You Be There" (2001)

"Go Back" is a song by German recording artist Jeanette. It was written by Frank Johnes, Tom Remm, and Kristina "Wonderbra" Bach and produced by Cobra for her debut studio album Enjoy! (2000). Released as the album's first single and Jeanette's English language singing debut, it became a top ten hit in Germany, peaking at number eight, and was eventually certified gold by the Bundesverband Musikindustrie (BVMI). Internationally, "Go Back" reached the top twenty of the Swiss Singles Chart.

== Formats and track listings ==
Maxi single
No.	Title	Length
1.	"Go Back" (Radio Edit)	3:34
2.	"Go Back" (Vocal Mix)	3:32
3.	"Go Back" (Girls Have More Fun Mix)	3:33
4.	"Go Back" (Girls Have More Fun Mi)	3:02
5.	"Amazing Grace" (TV-Version)	3:26

== Charts ==
=== Weekly charts ===
Chart (2000)	Peak position
Austria (Ö3 Austria Top 40)	59
Germany (GfK)	8
Switzerland (Schweizer Hitparade)	16

=== Year-end charts ===
Chart (2000)	Peak position
Germany (Official German Charts)	61

== Certifications and sales ==
Region	Certification	Certified units/sales
Germany (BVMI)	Gold	250,000^{^}
^{^} Shipments figures based on certification alone.
