= The Infant Light =

Single by Jeanette

from the album Merry Christmas
- B-side: "No More Tears"; "O Come All Ye Faithful (Adeste Fideles)"
- Released: 29 November 2004 (digital); 6 December 2004
- Length: 3:06
- Label: Kuba; Universal
- Songwriter(s): Frank Johnes; Kristina "Wonderbra" Bach
- Producer(s): Frank Johnes; Tom Remm

Jeanette singles chronology
"Run With Me" (2004)	"The Infant Light" (2004)	"Bad Girls Club" (2005)

"The Infant Light" is a song performed by German singer Jeanette Biedermann. It was written by Frank Johnes and Kristina "Wonderbra" Bach and produced by Johnes along with Tom Remm for Biedermann's fifth studio album Merry Christmas (2004). The Christmas song was released as the album's first and only single on 6 December 2004 and peaked at number 11 on the German Singles Chart.

== Track listings ==
These are the formats and track listings of major single releases of "The Infant Light".

CD single
(602498696620; Released 6 December 2004 )

1. "The Infant Light" – 3:07
2. "The Infant Light" (Christmas lounge version) – 3:52
3. "The Infant Light" (Karaoke version) – 3:07
4. "O Come All Ye Faithful (Adeste Fideles)" – 2:53
5. "The Infant Light" music video

Digital download
(Released 29 November 2004)

1. "The Infant Light" (Single version) – 3:06
2. "No More Tears" (Radio version) – 3:35

== Charts ==
Weekly chart performance for "The Infant Light"
Chart (2004)	Peak position
Germany (GfK)	11
Switzerland (Schweizer Hitparade)	59
