= It's Over Now (Jeanette song) =

2003 singe by Jeanette

Single by Jeanette

from the album Rock My Life
- B-side: "Love from Start to Finish"
- Released: 3 March 2003
- Length: 3:50
- Label: Kuba; Polydor; Universal
- Songwriter(s): Frank Johnes; Holger "Bodybrain" Kurschat; Kristina "Wonderbra" Bach
- Producer(s): Thorsten Brötzmann; Werner Becker

Jeanette singles chronology
| "We've Got Tonight" (2002) | "It's Over Now" (2003) | "Right Now" (2003) |

"It's Over Now" is a song by German recording artist Jeanette. It was written by Frank Johnes, Holger "Bodybrain" Kurschat, and Kristina "Wonderbra" Bach for the gold edition of her third studio album, Rock My Life (2003), while production was helmed by Thorsten Brötzmann and Werner Becker. Released as a single in March 2003, the song peaked at number six on the German Singles Chart, also reaching the top twenty on the Austrian Singles Chart. Bach re-recorded a German language version of the song, entitled "Ich tanz allein," for her album Leb dein Gefühl (2004).

== Music video ==
A music video for "It's Over Now" was directed by Oliver Sommer.

== Track listings ==
Maxi single
| No. | Title | Writer(s) | Producer(s) | Length |
|---|---|---|---|---|
| 1. | "It's Over Now" | Frank Johnes; Holger "Bodybrain" Kurschat; Kristina "Wonderbra" Bach | Thorsten Brötzmann; Werner Becker | 3:50 |
| 2. | "It's Over Now" (Up-Tempo radio mix) | Johnes; Kurschat; Bach | Brötzmann; Becker | 3:40 |
| 3. | "It's Over Now" (Unplugged mix) | Johnes; Kurschat; Bach | Brötzmann; Becker | 3:35 |
| 4. | "We've Got Tonight" (with Ronan Keating) (TV version) | Bob Seger | Bill Padley; Jem Godfrey | 3:46 |
| 5. | "Love from Start to Finish" | Johnes; Kurschat; Bach | Brötzmann | 3:20 |

== Charts ==
=== Weekly charts ===
Weekly chart performance for "It's Over Now"
| Chart (2003) | Peak position |
|---|---|
| Austria (Ö3 Austria Top 40) | 18 |
| Germany (GfK) | 6 |
| Switzerland (Schweizer Hitparade) | 63 |

=== Year-end charts ===
Year-end chart performance for "It's Over Now"
| Chart (2003) | Position |
|---|---|
| Germany (Media Control GfK) | 63 |
