= DNA (Jeanette Biedermann album) =

Studio album by Jeanette Biedermann
- Released: 20 September 2019
- Length: 50:03
- Label: Columbia
- Producer: Simon Allert; Daniel Flamm; Jules Kalmbacher; Eki von Nice; Jens Schneider; Jörg Weisselberg

Jeanette Biedermann chronology
Undress to the Beat (2009)	DNA (2019)

DNA is the eighth studio album by German singer Jeanette Biedermann. Her first solo album in a decade, it was released by Columbia Records on 20 September 2019. A breakaway from much of her early discography, it marked Biedermann's first solo album to be performed in German language, having previously released the albums Wir sind Ewig (2012) and Indianerehrenwort (2015) with her band Ewig.

== Critical reception ==
Professional ratings
Review scores
Source	Rating
laut.de	2/5 stars
MusicHeadQuarter.de	8/9

MusicHeadQuarter.de found thath DNA "has turned out to be a very mature album. Jeanette’s voice has gained noticeable depth compared to the pop-driven excursions of earlier decades. Songs like "Wie ein offenes Buch" feel highly authentic and autobiographical. Her vocals now carry a rockier tone and have largely moved away from the dance-pop tendencies of her early career [...] Jeanette proves she’s equally capable of capturing melancholic moods, and it’s touching how she pays tribute to her mother. laut.de editor Toni Hennig found that "Biedermann's various facets are completely lost in the overall sound. Her husband, who contributed to the album as both a songwriter and guitarist, is largely responsible for this. Whether it's the brief swell of a rock-influenced guitar or minimal acoustic arrangements, the result always feels equally polished. Any rough edges [...] have been smoothed out beyond recognition. Lifeless beats, occasionally paired with a bit of tinkling piano and soulless background choirs, frequently drown out the album’s more promising musical ideas. In the end, the slick production wins out over substance."

== Commercial performance ==
DNA debuted and peaked at number eight on the German Albums Chart. It became Biedermann's highest-charting album since Break On Through (2003). In Austria, it reached number 30 on the Austrian Albums Chart. DNA also peaked at number 31 on the Swiss Albums Chart, also becoming her biggest-selling album in Switzerland since Break on Through.

== Track listing ==
DNA track listing
No.	Title	Writer(s)	Producer(s)	Length
1.	"Wie ein offenes Buch"	Jeanette Biedermann; Thomas Porzig; Daniel Flamm; Lina Maly	Jules Kalmbacher; Flamm; Jens Schneider	2:58
2.	"Dumme Gedanken"	Biedermann; Porzig; Flamm; Lisa-Marie Neumann	Kalmbacher; Flamm; Schneider	3:41
3.	"Wenn ich Du wäre"	Biedermann; Jörg Weisselberg; Nico Suave; Simon Allert	Weisselberg; Allert	3:15
4.	"Besser mit Dir"	Biedermann; Kalmbacher; Flamm; Schneider	Kalmbacher; Flamm; Schneider	3:09
5.	"In den 90ern"	Biedermann; Weisselberg; Christoph Koterzina; Markus Schlichtherle; Kalmbacher; Flamm; Schneider	Eki von Nice; Kalmbacher; Flamm; Schneider	3:09
6.	"Eine handvoll Worte"	Biedermann; Weisselberg; Suave; Allert	Weisselberg; Allert	3:28
7.	"Deine Geschichten"	Biedermann; Weisselberg; Flamm	Kalmbacher; Flamm; Schneider	3:51
8.	"Ich lauf wieder los"	Biedermann; Weisselberg; Maly	Weisselberg; Allert	3:58
9.	"Mutterstadt"	Biedermann; Porzig; Maly; Neumann	Kalmbacher; Flamm; Schneider	3:30
10.	"Eins mit Dir"	Biedermann; Weisselberg; Allert; Christian Bömkes	Kalmbacher; Flamm; Schneider	3:06
11.	"Geliebte Freiheit"	Biedermann; Weisselberg; Mathias Grosch	Weisselberg; Allert	3:50
12.	"Vergiss nicht mich zu lieben"	Biedermann; Porzig; Maly	Kalmbacher; Flamm; Schneider	4:03
13.	"Ewig-Kenn-Effekt"	Biedermann; Daniel Schaub	Kalmbacher; Flamm; Schneider	3:26
14.	"Solotrip"	Biedermann; Weisselberg; Flamm	Weisselberg; Allert	4:05
Total length:				50:03

== Charts ==
Weekly chart performance for DNA
Chart (2018)	Peak position
Austrian Albums (Ö3 Austria)	30
German Albums (Offizielle Top 100)	8
Swiss Albums (Schweizer Hitparade)	31

== Release history ==
DNA release history
Region	Date	Format	Label	Ref(s)
Various	20 September 2019	CD; digital download; streaming	Columbia	
