= Merry Christmas (Jeanette album) =

Studio album by Jeanette
- Released: November 22, 2004
- Recorded: 2004
- Genre: Pop; Christmas
- Label: Kuba; Polydor; Universal
- Producer: Frank Johnes; Tom Remm

Jeanette chronology
Break on Through (2003)	Merry Christmas (2004)	Naked Truth (2006)

Singles from Merry Christmas
- 1. "The Infant Light" Released: December 6, 2004

Merry Christmas is a holiday album by German pop singer Jeanette. It was released by Universal Records on 22 November 2004 in Germany.

== Track listing ==
No.	Title	Length
1.	"Christmas Time"	3:18
2.	"O Come All Ye Faithful (Adeste Fideles)"	2:49
3.	"The Infant Light"	3:06
4.	"Follow the Star"	3:16
5.	"Mr. Santa Clause"	3:10
6.	"Evermore"	2:02
7.	"Silent Night"	2:49
8.	"Peace on Earth"	3:22
9.	"Ave Maria"	4:25
10.	"Hark! The Herald Angels Sing"	2:25
11.	"Run with Me" (X-Mas version)	3:39
12.	"Shine On"	3:35
13.	"Winter Ferryland"	3:24
14.	"O Holy Night"	3:39
15.	"Amazing Grace"	2:38

== Charts ==
Chart (2004)	Peak position
Austrian Albums (Ö3 Austria)	43
German Albums (Offizielle Top 100)	22
