= Naked Truth (Jeanette album) =

Studio album by Jeanette
- Released: April 7, 2006
- Recorded: 2004–2006
- Genre: Pop; pop rock
- Length: 58:42
- Label: Kuba; Polydor; Universal
- Producer: Thorsten Brötzmann; Frank Kretschmer; Steffen Langenfeld; Tom Remm; Jörg Weisselberg

Jeanette chronology
Merry Christmas (2004)	Naked Truth (2006)	Undress to the Beat (2009)

Singles from Naked Truth
- 1. "Run With Me" Released: August 11, 2004; 2. "Bad Girls Club" Released: October 14, 2005; 3. "Endless Love" Released: March 17, 2006; 4. "Heat of the Summer" Released: August 4, 2006

Professional ratings
Review scores
Source	Rating
CDStarts.de	2/10 stars
Laut.de	1/5 stars

Naked Truth is the sixth album by German pop singer Jeanette. It was released by Universal Records on 7 April 2006 in German-speaking Europe. A limited deluxe edition of the album was also released on 7 April 2006 with a bonus DVD.

== Track listing ==
Naked Truth – Standard edition
No.	Title	Writer(s)	Producer(s)	Length
1.	"All New"	Biedermann; Jörg Weisselberg	Weisselberg; Steffen Langenfeld	5:02
2.	"Moonshinenight"	Biedermann; Weisselberg	Weisselberg; Langenfeld	3:42
3.	"Bad Girls Club"	Biedermann; Weisselberg	Weisselberg; Langenfeld	3:23
4.	"I'm Alive"	Biedermann; Weisselberg	Weisselberg; Langenfeld	4:26
5.	"Burn"	Biedermann; Weisselberg	Weisselberg; Langenfeld	3:21
6.	"Get Freaky"	Biedermann; Weisselberg	Weisselberg; Langenfeld	3:04
7.	"Heat of that Summer"	Biedermann; Weisselberg	Weisselberg; Langenfeld	3:44
8.	"Heatwave in July"	Johnes; Wonderbra	Thorsten Brötzmann; Tom Remm	3:18
9.	"L.A. (City of Angels)"	Biedermann; Weisselberg	Weisselberg; Langenfeld	3:18
10.	"It's Not O.K. (The Poor Little Thing)"	Biedermann; Weisselberg	Weisselberg; Langenfeld	4:30
11.	"Endless Love"	Biedermann	Weisselberg; Langenfeld; Frank Kretschmer	3:26
12.	"Hurt"	Diane Warren	Weisselberg; Langenfeld	4:09
13.	"Frozen Sun"	Johnes; Wonderbra	Brötzmann; Remm	4:05
14.	"It's Alright"	Johnes; Wonderbra	Brötzmann; Remm	2:48
15.	"Naked Truth"	Biedermann; Weisselberg	Weisselberg; Langenfeld	3:51
16.	"Nightmare"	Biedermann; Weisselberg	Weisselberg; Langenfeld	3:35

Naked Truth – Limited edition
No.	Title	Writer(s)	Producer(s)	Length
17.	"Run with Me" (Rock Extended Version)	Johnes; Wonderbra	Kretschmer; Remm	3:57
18.	"Shine On"	Johnes; Wonderbra	Brötzmann; Remm	3:40
19.	"Hearts Burning Down"	Johnes; Wonderbra	Brötzmann; Remm	4:13

== Charts ==
Chart (2006)	Peak position
Austrian Albums (Ö3 Austria)	44
German Albums (Offizielle Top 100)	14
Swiss Albums (Schweizer Hitparade)	55

=== Singles ===
"Endless Love" (2006)	Peak position
Austria (Ö3 Austria Top 40)	67
Germany (GfK)	20
Switzerland (Schweizer Hitparade)	35
