= Hold the Line (Jeanette song) =

Single by Jeanette

from the album Break On Through
- Released: 28 June 2004
- Length: 3:40
- Label: Kuba; Universal
- Songwriter(s): Frank Johnes; Holger "Bodybrain" Kurschat; Kristina "Wonderbra" Bach
- Producer(s): Tom Remm; Frank Kretschmer

Jeanette singles chronology
"No Eternity" (2004)	"Hold the Line" (2004)	"Run With Me" (2004)

"Hold the Line" is a song performed by German singer Jeanette Biedermann. It was written by Frank Johnes, Holger "Bodybrain" Kurschat, and Kristina "Wonderbra" Bach and produced by Tom Remm and Frank Kretschmer for Biedermann's fourth studio album Break On Through (2003). It was released by Kuba Music and Universal Music as the album's third and final single on 28 June 2004 and peaked at number 11 on the German Singles Chart.

== Music video ==
A music video for "Hold the Line" was directed by Thorsten Klauschke.

== Track listing ==
All tracks produced by Tom Remm and Frank Kretschmer; written by Frank Johnes, Holger "Bodybrain" Kurschat, and Kristina "Wonderbra" Bach.

Digital single
No.	Title	Length
1.	"Hold the Line" (radio edit)	3:49
2.	"Hold the Line" (DTM version)	3:59
3.	"Hold the Line" (acoustic mix)	3:39
4.	"Himalaya"	4:05
5.	"Hold the Line" (acoustic mix NRW RF)	3:44

== Charts ==
Weekly chart performance for "Run with Me"
Chart (2004)	Peak position
Austria (Ö3 Austria Top 40)	27
Germany (GfK)	11
