= 1987 (Fibes, Oh Fibes! album) =

Studio album by Fibes, Oh Fibes!
- Released: 2009
- Genres: Blue-eyed soul, indietronica
- Length: 36:48
- Label: Universal Music

Fibes, Oh Fibes! chronology
Emotional (2006)	1987 (2009)

1987 is an album by Swedish band Fibes, Oh Fibes! released in 2009 which was collaborated with Gary Kemp, Pontus Winnberg, Petter Winberg and Oskar Linnros. The album also contains duets with Björn Skifs and Kim Wilde. The album won "Pop Album of the Year" at the 2010 Grammis Awards.

== Reception ==
AllMusic rated the album four stars, describing it as "the culmination of their work to date" that "builds upon the soul-pop of their debut" and "the disco-funk inclinations of their follow-up effort".

== Track listing ==
No.	Title	Length
1.	"Dubious"	3:29
2.	"Love Child"	3:21
3.	"Silly Lover"	3:48
4.	"New York City"	5:06
5.	"Love Will Always Find a Way"	4:06
6.	"Run to You" (duet with Kim Wilde)	3:29
7.	"My Calendar" (featuring Björn Skifs)	4:05
8.	"Stuck on You"	3:11
9.	"I Think I Blew It Again"	3:30
10.	"Goodbye Sunshine"	2:42
Total length:		36:47
