= Linda Sundblad =

Swedish singer, actress and model (born 1981)

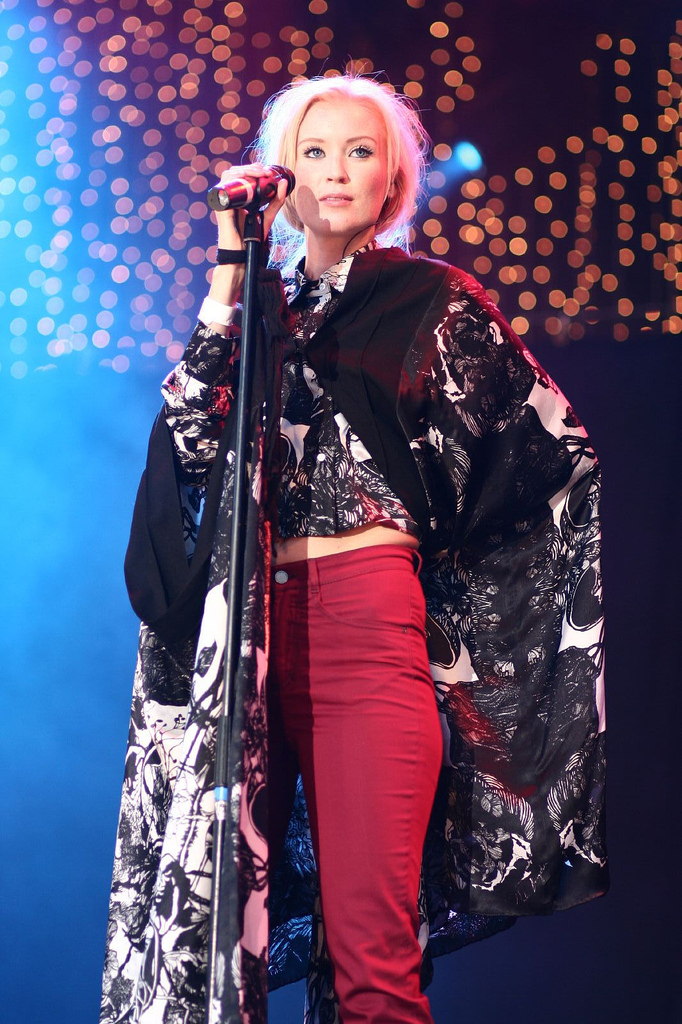

Background information
- Born: Linda Caroline Sundblad; 5 July 1981 (age 45)
- Origin: Lidköping, Sweden
- Genres: Pop; dance; Europop
- Occupations: Singer, songwriter
- Website: www.thesundblad.com

Linda Caroline Sundblad (born 5 July 1981, in Lidköping) is a Swedish singer, actress and model.

== Career ==
=== Lambretta ===
Dropping out of school at the age of 15 to join the pop rock music band Lambretta, she experienced much success at a young age. After releasing three albums with Lambretta, she decided in Autumn 2005 to go solo.

=== Solo ===
Her first solo single, "Oh Father", was released in September 2006 and her debut album, Oh My God!, a couple of months later. "Oh Father" was nominated for a Grammis award. Musicwise it remained silent around Sundblad until the second part of 2009 when the new single "2 All My Girls" was released and a second album announced for 24 March 2010.

=== Other projects ===
She is also featured on the Reflections album by Apocalyptica, for which she sings the vocals to "Faraway Vol. 2". Sundblad works currently with House music artist Rasmus Faber; she sang for him on the single "Everything Is Alright", which was released on 22 November 2008 and on his second single "Always", which was released on 6 April 2009. Sundblad also features on Rasmus Faber's debut album Where We Belong.

=== Melodifestivalen 2011 ===
Linda Sundblad participated in Melodifestivalen 2011, the Swedish selection for the Eurovision Song Contest 2011. She competed in the third semi-final on 19 February 2011 in Cloetta Center, Linköping, with the song "Lucky You", which finished 6th and did not qualify for the final.

== Model career ==
Sundblad has worked since 2005 as a model, presenting L'Oréal and Munthe plus Simonsen.

== Radio career ==
Since 8 November 2006 Sunblad has worked as a radio announcer at Sveriges Radio, where she moderated the programme P3 Star.

== Discography ==
Singles

- "Oh Father" (2006, SE #1)
- "Lose You" (2006, SE #2)
- "Back in Time" (2007)
- "Who (Q Boy)" (2007)
- "Cheat" (2007)
- "2 All My Girls" (2009, SE #50)
- "Let's Dance" (2010, SE #7)
- "Perfect Nobody" (2010)
- "Lucky You" (2011)

Albums

- Oh My God! (2006, SE #11)
- Manifest (2010)
- Öppna ditt hjärta så ska du få EP (2012)

=== Lambretta ===
Albums

- Breakfast (July 1999)
- Lambretta (June 2002)
- The Fight (March 2005)

Singles

- "Blow My Fuses" (1999)
- "Absolutely Nothing" (1999)
- "I'm Coming Home" (2000)
- "Bimbo" (April 2002)
- "Creep" (August 2002)
- "Perfect Tonight" (2002)
- "Chemical" (2004)
- "Anything" (2004)
- "Kill Me" (2004)

=== Guest appearances ===
Singles

with Apocalyptica

- "Faraway Vol. 2" (2003)

with Rasmus Faber

- "Everything Is Alright" (2008)
- "Always" (2009)

with Kleerup

- "History" (2009)

== TV appearances ==
- "Sommarkrysset" (2007)
- "FörKväll" (2006–2007)
- "Nyhetsmorgon" (2006–2007)
- "Bingolotto" (2006)
- "Studio Virtanen" (2006)
- "Vi i femman" (2005)
- "Körslaget" (2010)
- "Allsång på Skansen" (2010)
