= 1987 (artist) =

Swedish producer, songwriter, and musician

- Born: Victor Holmberg; 28 April 1987 (age 39); Stockholm, Sweden
- Genres: Pop, R&B
- Occupations: Musician, songwriter, producer
- Instruments: Vocals, piano
- Years active: 2013–present
- Label: Parlophone Records

Victor Holmberg (born 28 April 1987), known professionally as 1987, is a Swedish producer, songwriter and musician of solo projects. He is a member of the Swedish electronic music duo Montauk.

== Biography ==
In September 2013, 1987 released his debut single, "Ocean".

== Discography ==
=== Albums ===
- Härskarkonst (2015)

=== Singles ===
- "Bomb" (2014)
- "Michelle" (2014)
- "Ocean" (2013)
- "Hej då" (2015)

=== Remixes ===
- Tove Styrke – "Ego" (1987 Remix)
- Alice Boman – "Waiting" (1987 Remix)
- Marlene – "Bon Voyage" (1987 Remix)
- Lucas Nord feat. Emil Heró – "Feelings for You" (1987 Remix)
- Wild at Heart – "Saving All My Tears" (1987 Remix)
- Postiljonen – "All That We Had Is Lost" (1987 Remix)
- Attu – "Don't Sleep" (1987 Remix)
- Sportsman – "Usher" (1987 Remix)
- SomethingALaMode feat. DWNTWN – "On My Mind" (1987 Remix)

=== As producer ===
- Montauk - The Newsroom EP, (Brilliantine, 2011)
- Sportsman - Usher EP, (Best Fit Recordings, 2013)
