= Sunny Days: The Children's Television Revolution That Changed America =

2020 non-fiction book by David Kamp

- First edition
- Author: David Kamp
- Language: English
- Genre: Non-fiction
- Publisher: Simon & Schuster
- Publication date: May 12, 2020
- Publication place: United States

Sunny Days: The Children's Television Revolution That Changed America is a 2020 book by David Kamp about Sesame Street and other progressive educational programs for children developed in the 1960s and 1970s, such as Mister Rogers' Neighborhood, The Electric Company, Free to Be... You and Me, and Schoolhouse Rock! It was published by Simon & Schuster on May 12, 2020.

Melena Ryzik of The New York Times called it a "lively and bewitching recounting of a particularly ripe period in television and cultural history." Publishers Weekly gave this book a starred review, describing it as a "diligent and lively chronicle" and a "passionate, highly engaging media history".
