= Material Boy (Don't Look Back) =

Single by Jeanette

from the album Undress to the Beat
- Released: 29 May 2009
- Length: 4:18
- Label: One Two; Universal
- Songwriter(s): Thomas Troelsen; Remee
- Producer(s): Vacuum

Jeanette singles chronology
"Undress to the Beat" (2009)	"Material Boy (Don't Look Back)" (2009)	"Solitary Rose" (2009)

"Material Boy (Don't Look Back)" is a song performed by German singer Jeanette Biedermann. It was written by Thomas Troelsen and Remee and produced by Anders Wollbeck and Mattias Lindblom from production duo Vacuum for her seventh album Undress to the Beat (2009). It was released by One Two Media as the album's second single on 29 May 2009 in German-speaking Europe.

== Music video ==
Biedermann reteamed with Katja Kuhl, director of the music video for her previous single "Undress to the Beat," to film the visuals for "Material Boy (Don't Look Back)." As with "Undress to the Beat," it was also produced by Mutter & Vater Productions.

== Track listings ==
Digital single
No.	Title	Producer(s)	Length
1.	"Material Boy (Don't Look Back)" (single version)	Vacuum	4:02
2.	"Material Boy (Don't Look Back)" (album version)	Vacuum	4:21

Enhanced single
No.	Title	Producer(s)	Length
1.	"Material Boy (Don't Look Back)" (single version)	Vacuum	4:02
2.	"Material Boy (Don't Look Back)" (Micha Moor remix)	Vacuum; Micha Moor^{[a]}	6:32

Notes

- ^{^a} signifies additional producer(s)

== Personnel ==
Credits lifted from the liner notes of "Material Boy (Don't Look Back)".

- Jeanette Biedermann – vocalist
- Frank Kretschmer – vocal recording
- Remee – writer
- Henry Sarmiento – vocal engineer
- Thomas Troelsen – writer
- Vacuum – producers

== Charts ==
Weekly chart performance for "Material Boy (Don't Look Back)"
Chart (2009)	Peak position
Austria (Ö3 Austria Top 40)	69
Germany (GfK)	43
