= Lambretta (band) =

Swedish pop rock band (1993–2005)

- Origin: Skaraborg, Sweden
- Genres: Hard rock; alternative rock
- Years active: 1993–2005
- Labels: Polar Music; Universal Music Group
- Past members: Linda Sundblad; Anders Eliasson; Klas Edmundsson; Tomas Gabriel Persic; Petter Lantz; Marcus Nowak

Lambretta was a Swedish pop rock band that existed from 1993 till 2005.

== Biography ==
The band started in 1993 but then without Sundblad doing the vocals, after some time she joined and they released their debut album Breakfast. After releasing two more albums Sundblad announced in late 2005 she was going to do a solo record. This caused the remaining members of Lambretta to stop and form a new band called Psych Onation.

=== Members ===
- Linda Sundblad – vocals
- Klas Edmundsson – guitar
- Petter Lantz – bass
- Marcus Nowak – drums

=== Former members ===
- Anders Eliasson
- Tomas Persic

== Discography ==
=== Albums ===
List of albums, with selected chart positions
Title	Album details	Peak chart positions					
Title	Album details	SWE	AUT	FIN	GER	NOR	SWI
Breakfast	Released: 1999; Label: Universal Music Sweden (153 886–2); Format: CD	—	—	—	—	—	—
Lambretta	Released: February 2001; Label: Polar, Universal (016 284–2); Format: CD	14	18	16	25	17	55
The Fight	Released: December 2004; Label: Polar, Universal (986 953–4); Format: CD	34	—	—	—	—	—

=== Singles ===
List of singles, with selected chart positions
Title	Year	Peak chart positions						Album
Title	Year	SWE	AUS	AUT	GER	NOR	SWI	Album
"Blow My Fuses"	1999	42	—	—	—	—	—	Breakfast
"Absolutely Nothing"	1999	57	—	—	—	—	—	Breakfast
"I'm Coming Home"	2000	—	—	—	—	—	—	Breakfast
"Bimbo"	2001	2	87	18	27	4	43	Lambretta
"Creep"	2001	10	—	45	64	—	—	Lambretta
"Perfect Tonight"	2002	—	—	—	—	—	—	Lambretta
"Kill Me"	2004	44	—	—	—	—	—	The Fight
"Chemical"	2004	29	—	—	—	—	—	The Fight
"Anything"	2005	—	—	—	—	—	—	The Fight
