= Anna und die Liebe =

- Also known as: Anna and (the) Love
- Opening theme: Rosenstolz – Gib mir Sonne
- Country of origin: Germany
- Original language: German
- No. of seasons: 4
- No. of episodes: 926

Production
- Producers: Petra Bodenbach; Christian Popp; Gilbert Funke
- Running time: 25 min

Original release
- Network: Sat.1
- Release: 25 August 2008 – 13 April 2012

Anna und die Liebe (Anna and (the) Love) is the eleventh Telenovela made in Germany. It has aired since 25 August 2008 on German channel Sat.1 and Austrian Channel ORF 1.

== Summary ==
In its first season, Anna Polauke is extremely shy. In front of strange and important people, she can't utter a single word or simply starts to stutter. She works at her mother's restaurant Goldelse (Golden Elisabeth), dreaming about working at the advertising agency Broda & Broda.

Because of her impediment, her job interview ends up being a disaster. Also, she suffers from her stepfather Armin and her half-sister Katja. Armin is annoyed, because Anna still loves her missing father overall, Katja hates Anna realizing that she isn't as intelligent as Anna.

When Anna meets Jonas Broda, junior director of Broda & Broda, she just wants only one thing: To work at the advertising agency as soon as possible and to be around Jonas.

But her halfsister Katja steals Anna's idea for a campaign for a perfume and gets a job at Broda & Broda. Anna manages to get a job as a runner at Broda & Broda - and without her creative ideas, Katja would lose her job at Broda & Broda. She wins Jonas for herself, while Anna is still seen as a talentless runner.

The first season (episodes 1–311) revolved around Anna and Jonas. Jeanette Biedermann (Anna) took a break from the show, to focus on her music career, with her new album (Undress to the Beat). Due to its ratings success, Sat.1 ordered more episodes. Since its launch, the telenovela had four seasons (consecutively). Each season would focus on the protagonist (not necessarily Anna) and their "love". The second season was mainly about Mia and Alexander (episode 312–564). Third season (with Jeanette Biedermann's return to the show) centered on Anna with Tom and Enrique (episode 565–798). Fourth and final season (episode 799–926) is with Nina and Luca.

== Cast ==
=== Main actors ===
Actor	Role	Episodes	Years
Jeanette Biedermann	Anna Lanford, née Polauke, widowed Broda	1–385; 560–869	2008–2010; 2010–2012
Heike Jonca	Susanne Polauke	1–926	2008–2012
Rainer Will	Armin Müller	1–337	2008–2009
Karolina Lodyga	Katja von der Recke, née Polauke, divorced Broda	1–350; 645–717; 812–825	2008–2010; 2011; 2011
Mathieu Carrière	Robert Broda †	1–154	2008–2009
Lars Löllmann	Gerrit Broda †	1–319	2008–2009
Barbara Lanz	Maja Roth	1–475	2008–2010
Franziska Matthus	Natascha Broda	1–926	2008–2012
Roy Peter Link	Jonas Broda †	1–385; 553–625	2008–2010; 2010–2011
Maja Maneiro	Paloma Vegaz, née Greco	1–926	2008–2012
Mike Adler	Jannick Juncker	1–181	2008–2009
Sebastian König	Maik Majewski	1–926	2008´–2012
Karin Kienzer	Stefanie "Steffi" Hauschke	1–926	2008–2012
Alexander Klaws	Lars Hauschke	2–428	2008–2010
Jil Funke	Lily Rüssmann, divorced Hauschke	16–732	2008–2011
Wolfgang Wagner	Ingo Polauke aka Ulrich Hartmann	40–115; 321–926	2008–2009; 2009–2012
Tanja Wenzel	Annett Darcy †	100–122; 258–544	2009; 2009–2010
Peter Günther	Georg Sander	182–281	2009
Paul T. Grasshoff	Alexander "Alex" Zeiss	190–565	2009–2010
Robert Jarczyk	Richard Darcy †	261–513	2009–2010
Bernhard Bozian	Jonathan "Jojo" Maschke	273–926	2009–2012
Josephine Schmidt	Mia Zeiss, née Maschke	293–565	2009–2010
Lee Rychter	David Darcy, adopted, né Seidel †	303–742	2009–2011
Fiona Erdmann	Jessica Kramer	348–632	2010–2011
Joanna Schürmer	Brigitte Galifianakis	398–495	2010
Bo Hansen	Julian Freund	412–563	2010
Jacob Weigert	Enrique Vegaz aka Toni Behrmann	432–548; 628–926	2010; 2011–2012
Patrick Kalupa	Tom Lanford	556–869	2010–2012
Peter Windhofer	Steve Welder †	561–644	2010–2011
Sarah Mühlhause	Carla Rhonstedt, née Lindenberg	564–926	2010–2012
Chris Gebert	Jürgen "Virgin" Hilgendiek	566–926	2010–2012
Klaus-Dieter Klebsch	Bruno Lanford	576–926	2010–2012
Wanda Worch	Isabella "Paule" Lanford	588–926	2010–2012
Lilli Hollunder	Jasmin Al Sharif	598–926	2010–2012
Larissa Marolt	Maxi König	630–758	2011
Iris Shala	Michelle "Minni" Herrmann	745–926	2011–2012
Maria Wedig	Nina Benzoni, née Hinze	769–926	2011–2012
Frederic Böhle	Kai Kosmar	772–926	2011–2012
Manuel Cortez	Luca Benzoni	778–926	2011–2012
Kasia Borek	Olivia "Liv" Kosmar	805–926	2011–2012
Frank Ziegler	Chris Doppler	850–926	2011–2012
Björn Bugri	Nick Majewski	859–926	2012

== Broadcasters ==
Austria	Anna und die Liebe	ORF eins	25 August 2008	13 April 2012	Monday to Friday
Croatia	Ana	Doma TV	3 January 2011	23 December 2011	Monday to Friday
Germany	Anna und die Liebe	Sat.1	25 August 2008	13 April 2012	Monday to Friday
Hungary	Szerelmes Anna	TV2	2 January 2013		Monday to Friday
