= Rock My Life =

Studio album by Jeanette
- Released: 25 November 2002
- Recorded: 2002
- Genre: Pop; pop rock
- Label: Polydor; Universal
- Producer: Werner Becker; Bodybrain; Thorsten Brötzmann; Frank Johnes; Jeremy Godfrey; Bill Padley; Tom Remm; E. Shustring

Jeanette chronology
| Delicious (2001) | Rock My Life (2002) | Break on Through (2003) |

Singles from Rock My Life
- 1. "Rock My Life" Released: October 14, 2002; 2. "We've Got Tonight" Released: November 11, 2002; 3. "It's Over Now" Released: March 3, 2003; 4. "Right Now" Released: June 16, 2003

Rock My Life is the third album by German pop singer Jeanette Biedermann. It was released by Universal Records on 25 November 2002 in German-speaking Europe. In 2003, a gold edition reissue of the album was released, featuring additional songs. In 2019 the Album reach at #60 in the German Download - Charts.

== Track listing ==
Rock My Life – Standard edition
| No. | Title | Writer(s) | Producer(s) | Length |
|---|---|---|---|---|
| 1. | "Rock My Life" | Frank Johnes; Bodybrain; Wonderbra | Frank Johnes; Tm Remm; Bodybrain; E. Shustring | 3:57 |
| 2. | "Right Now" | Johnes; Bodybrain; Wonderbra | Johnes; Remm | 3:21 |
| 3. | "Jean" | William King; Wonderbra | Thorsten Brötzmann; Werner Becker | 4:31 |
| 4. | "Don't Treat Me Badly" | Johnes; Bodybrain; Wonderbra | Johnes; Remm | 4:31 |
| 5. | "Win Your Love" | Johnes; Bodybrain; Wonderbra | Brötzmann | 3:19 |
| 6. | "To Fall in Love" | Johnes; Bodybrain; Wonderbra | Johnes; Remm | 3:29 |
| 7. | "Love From Start to Finish" | Johnes; Bodybrain; Wonderbra | Brötzmann | 3:11 |
| 8. | "Heartbeat" | Johnes; Bodybrain; Wonderbra | Johnes; Remm | 4:38 |
| 9. | "Flight Tonight" | Johnes; Bodybrain; Wonderbra | Johnes; Remm | 3:09 |
| 10. | "Tell Me" | Johnes; Bodybrain; Wonderbra | Johnes; Remm | 3:35 |
| 11. | "Upright" | Johnes; Remm; Bodybrain; Wonderbra | Brötzmann | 3:06 |
| 12. | "Let's Party Tonight" | Johnes; Bodybrain; Wonderbra | Johnes; Remm | 3:07 |
| 13. | "You're Nothing Better" | Johnes; Bodybrain; Wonderbra | Johnes; Remm | 3:07 |
| 14. | "Heaven Can't Lie" | Johnes; Bodybrain; Wonderbra | Johnes; Remm | 3:25 |
| 15. | "We've Got Tonight" (with Ronan Keating) | Bob Seger | Bill Padley; Jeremy Godfrey | 3:38 |
| 16. | "So Deep Inside" (Hidden track) | Johnes; Wonderbra; Martinsson | Johnes; Remm | 3:48 |

Rock My Life – Gold edition
| No. | Title | Writer(s) | Producer(s) | Length |
|---|---|---|---|---|
| 1. | "Rock My Life" | Frank Johnes; Bodybrain; Wonderbra | Frank Johnes; Tm Remm; Bodybrain; E. Shustring | 3:57 |
| 2. | "Flight Tonight" | Johnes; Bodybrain; Wonderbra | Johnes; Remm | 3:09 |
| 3. | "Right Now" | Johnes; Bodybrain; Wonderbra | Johnes; Remm | 3:21 |
| 4. | "Jean" | William King; Wonderbra | Thorsten Brötzmann; Werner Becker | 4:31 |
| 5. | "Don't Treat Me Badly" | Johnes; Bodybrain; Wonderbra | Johnes; Remm | 4:31 |
| 6. | "Win Your Love" | Johnes; Bodybrain; Wonderbra | Brötzmann | 3:19 |
| 7. | "To Fall in Love" | Johnes; Bodybrain; Wonderbra | Johnes; Remm | 3:29 |
| 8. | "Love From Start to Finish" | Johnes; Bodybrain; Wonderbra | Brötzmann | 3:11 |
| 9. | "Heartbeat" | Johnes; Bodybrain; Wonderbra | Johnes; Remm | 4:38 |
| 10. | "Tell Me" | Johnes; Bodybrain; Wonderbra | Johnes; Remm | 3:35 |
| 11. | "Upright" | Johnes; Remm; Bodybrain; Wonderbra | Brötzmann | 3:06 |
| 12. | "Let's Party Tonight" | Johnes; Bodybrain; Wonderbra | Johnes; Remm | 3:07 |
| 13. | "You're Nothing Better" | Johnes; Bodybrain; Wonderbra | Johnes; Remm | 3:07 |
| 14. | "Heaven Can't Lie" | Johnes; Bodybrain; Wonderbra | Johnes; Remm | 3:25 |
| 15. | "We've Got Tonight" (with Ronan Keating) | Bob Seger | Bill Padley; Jeremy Godfrey | 3:38 |
| 16. | "It's Over Now" | Johnes; Bodybrain; Wonderbra | Brötzmann; Becker | 3:57 |
| 17. | "Kiss My Butt" | Johnes; Bodybrain; Wonderbra | Frank Kretschmer; Remm | 3:26 |
| 18. | "Unbreak My Dreams" | Johnes; Bodybrain; Wonderbra | Brötzmann; Becker | 9:50 |
| 19. | "So Deep Inside" (Hidden track) | Johnes; Wonderbra; Martinsson | Johnes; Remm |

== Charts ==
=== Weekly charts ===
| Chart (2002) | Peak position |
|---|---|
| Austrian Albums (Ö3 Austria) | 28 |
| German Albums (Offizielle Top 100) | 7 |
| Swiss Albums (Schweizer Hitparade) | 75 |

=== Year-end charts ===
| Chart (2003) | Position |
|---|---|
| German Albums (Offizielle Top 100) | 55 |

== Certifications ==
| Region | Certification | Certified units/sales |
|---|---|---|
| Germany (BVMI) | Platinum | 300,000^{^} |
^{^} Shipments figures based on certification alone.
