= Run with Me =

"Run With Me"

Single by Jeanette

from the album Naked Truth
- Released: 8 November 2004
- Label: Kuba; Universal
- Songwriters: Johan Bobäck; Christian Fast; Marica Lindé; Mans Ek
- Producer: Johan Bobäck

Jeanette singles chronology
"Hold the Line" (2004)	"Run With Me" (2004)	"The Infant Light" (2004)

"Run With Me" is a pop rock song performed by German singer Jeanette Biedermann. It was written by Johan Bobäck, Christian Fast, Marica Lindé and Mans Ek and produced by Bobäck for Jeanette's sixth album Naked Truth (2006). The song was released as a single on 8 November 2004 and peaked at number three on the German Singles Chart, ranking it among Biedermann's highest-charting singles. The song was included on The Sims 2: Nightlife soundtrack.

== Music video ==
The music video for "Run With Me" was directed by Jörn Heitmann. The video features Jeanette performing with her band on an elaborate set. It begins with Jeanette and her band performing on a raised set. She is then shown observing an unhappy young couple in black-and-white. As she smiles at them, colour begins to appear on the screen and the couple happily stand up and hold hands. This is followed by Jeanette encouraging a young man to complete his studies. The music video concludes with a group of people running with Jeanette.

== Formats and track listings ==
These are the formats and track listings of major single releases of "Run With Me".

CD single
(0602498688793; Released 8 November 2004)

1. "Run With Me" (Rock radio edit) – 3:35
2. "Run With Me" (Pop radio edit) – 3:37
3. "Rock A Fella" – 2:40
4. "Run With Me" (Karaoke version) – 3:31
5. "Run With Me" (Dance edit) – 3:16
6. "Run With Me" music video

Digital download
(Released 8 November 2004)

1. "Run With Me" (Rock radio edit) – 3:35
2. "Run With Me" (Pop radio edit) – 3:37
3. "Rock A Fella" – 2:40
4. "Run With Me" (Karaoke version) – 3:31
5. "Run With Me" (Dance edit) – 3:16

== Charts ==
Weekly chart performance for "Run with Me"
Chart (2004)	Peak position
Austria (Ö3 Austria Top 40)	14
Germany (GfK)	3
Switzerland (Schweizer Hitparade)	24
