= Break On Through (album) =

Studio album by Jeanette
- Released: 3 November 2003
- Recorded: 2003
- Genres: Pop; pop rock
- Length: 57:52
- Labels: Kuba; Polydor; Universal
- Producers: Thorsten Brötzmann; Frank Johnes; Frank Kretschmer; Tom Remm

Jeanette chronology
Rock My Life (2002)	Break On Through (2003)	Merry Christmas (2004)

Singles from Break On Through
- 1. "Rockin' on Heaven's Floor" Released: 13 October 2003; 2. "No Eternity" Released: 8 April 2004; 3. "Hold the Line" Released: 28 June 2004

Professional ratings
Review scores
Source	Rating
CDStarts.de	5/10 stars
Laut.de	2/5 stars

Break On Through is the fourth album by German pop singer Jeanette. It was released by Universal Records in 2003 in German-speaking Europe. A limited deluxe edition of the album was also released in 2003, including bonus tracks as well as music videos. The following year, a platinum edition reissue of the album issued, including additional songs.

== Track listing ==
Break On Through – Standard edition
No.	Title	Writer(s)	Producer(s)	Length
1.	"Rockin' on Heaven's Floor"	Frank Johnes; Tom Remm; Bodybrain; Wonderbra	Johnes; Remm	3:24
2.	"Hold the Line"	Johnes; Bodybrain; Wonderbra	Johnes; Frank Kretschmer	3:40
3.	"Burning Alive"	Johnes; Bodybrain; Wonderbra	Johnes; Kretschmer	3:16
4.	"Himalaya"	Johnes; Bodybrain; Wonderbra	Remm; Kretschmer	4:04
5.	"Rebelution"	Johnes; Bodybrain; Wonderbra	Remm; Kretschmer	3:18
6.	"We Are the Living"	Johnes; Bodybrain; Wonderbra	Remm; Kretschmer	3:47
7.	"Tellin' You Goodbye"	Johnes; Bodybrain; Wonderbra	Thorsten Brötzmann	3:36
8.	"Mystery"	Johnes; Bodybrain; Wonderbra	Remm; Kretschmer	3:38
9.	"Bad Girl"	Johnes; Bodybrain; Wonderbra	Brötzmann	3:18
10.	"7 Nights – 7 Days"	Johnes; Bodybrain; Wonderbra	Brötzmann	4:18
11.	"Highflyer"	Johnes; Bodybrain; Wonderbra	Remm; Kretschmer	2:57
12.	"True Blue Heroes"	Johnes; Bodybrain; Wonderbra	Remm; Kretschmer	3:50
13.	"Make Love"	Johnes; Bodybrain; Wonderbra	Remm; Kretschmer	3:35
14.	"Mr. Big"	Johnes; Bodybrain; Wonderbra	Remm; Kretschmer	3:50
15.	"Forever and Ever"	Johnes; Bodybrain; Wonderbra	Remm; Kretschmer	3:42
16.	"Kick Up the Fire"	Johnes; Bodybrain; Wonderbra	Brötzmann	3:49

Break On Through – Limited edition
No.	Title	Writer(s)	Producer(s)	Length
16.	"Rock City"	Johnes; Bodybrain; Wonderbra	Remm; Kretschmer	2:57
17.	"Rockin' On "Musicago" Studio Floor" (Berlin 2003)			3:58
18.	"Making of a Song"			11:02
19.	"Break On Through Shooting" (Berlin 2003)			4:01
20.	"Rock My Life Tour 2003"			21:30

Break On Through – Platinum edition
No.	Title	Writer(s)	Producer(s)	Length
16.	"Rock City"	Johnes; Bodybrain; Wonderbra	Remm; Kretschmer	2:57
17.	"69" (Megalodon-Mixx)	Johnes; Bodybrain; Wonderbra	Remm; Kretschmer	3:15
18.	"No Eternity"	Biederman; Remm; Johnes; Bodybrain; Wonderbra	Remm; Kretschmer	3:38
19.	"Will You Be There" (Acoustic Version)	Johnes; Remm; Wonderbra	Cobra	2:56
20.	"Go Back" (Acoustic Version)	Johnes; Remm; Wonderbra	Cobra	3:57

== Charts ==
=== Weekly charts ===
Chart (2003)	Peak position
Austrian Albums (Ö3 Austria)	7
German Albums (Offizielle Top 100)	6
Swiss Albums (Schweizer Hitparade)	10

=== Year-end charts ===
Chart (2003)	Position
German Albums (Offizielle Top 100)	98
Swiss Albums (Schweizer Hitparade)	98
Chart (2004)	Position
German Albums (Offizielle Top 100)	70

== Certifications ==
Region	Certification	Certified units/sales
Austria (IFPI Austria)	Gold	15,000^{*}
Germany (BVMI)	Platinum	200,000^{^}
^{*} Sales figures based on certification alone.^{^} Shipments figures based on certification alone.
