= Johan Bobäck =

Swedish record producer and songwriter

Johan Kermit Bobäck
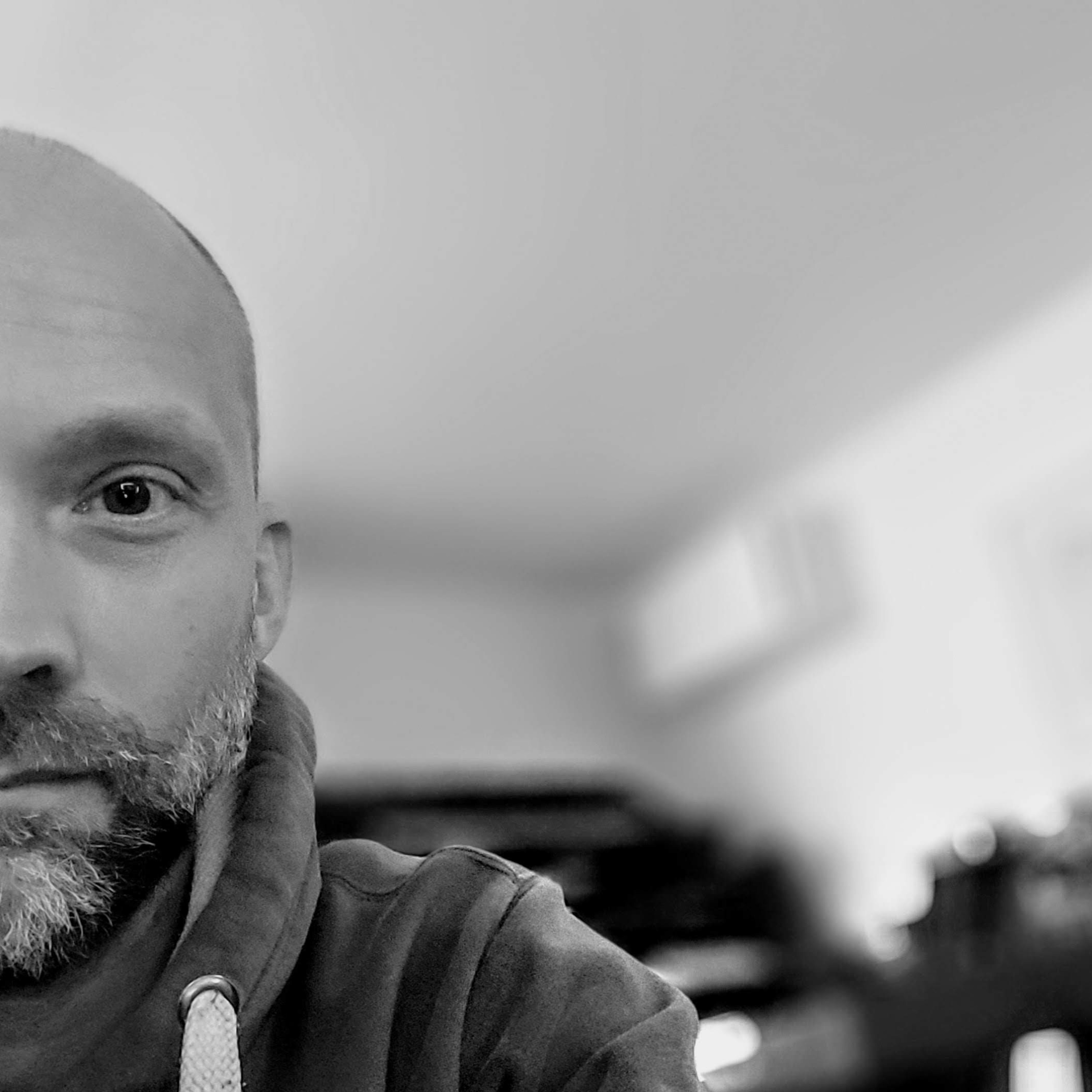
- Kermit
- Occupations: Software Developer, Songwriter, Music Producer

Johan Bobäck also known as "Kermit" is a record producer and songwriter from Sweden. "Kermit" has written and produced songs for and together with Cyndi Lauper, Rachel Platten, Aldo Nova, Garou, Jay Graydon, Randy Goodrum, Chris Norman, Fredrik Thomander, Darin, Max Martin, Peer Åström, Andreas Carlsson, Alexander Kronlund, Troy Bonnes a.k.a. Troy This, Dennis Morgan (songwriter), Jeanette Biedermann (Undress to the Beat), Linda Sundblad, Play, Ola Svensson a.k.a. Brother Leo (musician), Daniel Jones (musician) from Savage Garden among others.

He wrote and produced two songs (Into the Nightlife and Echo) with Cyndi Lauper, Peer Åström and Max Martin for Lauper's, Grammy Nominated, 2008 album Bring Ya to the Brink. Both songs became singles. Linda Sundblad's single 2 all my girls and Darin's single Viva la vida by Coldplay are both produced by Kermit. He was also involved, both as writer and producer, in Linda Sundblad's album Manifest, released in early 2010. Bobäck has also been involved as a music producer for the Golden Globe winning TV show Glee by Fox. In 2011, the song 1000 ships with Rachel Platten appeared in the TV show Grey's Anatomy. His other songs as a writer and producer include I´m in love and One day with Ola (Brother Leo (musician)), I'm in love together with Shellback (record producer), Alexander Kronlund. During 2017-2018 Kermit's been involved in NoNoNo's new album "Undertones". In 2024 - 2025 Kermit released two new artists, IDA-L and ASTRID (an indie-synt pop duo from Sweden).
