= Kristina Bach =

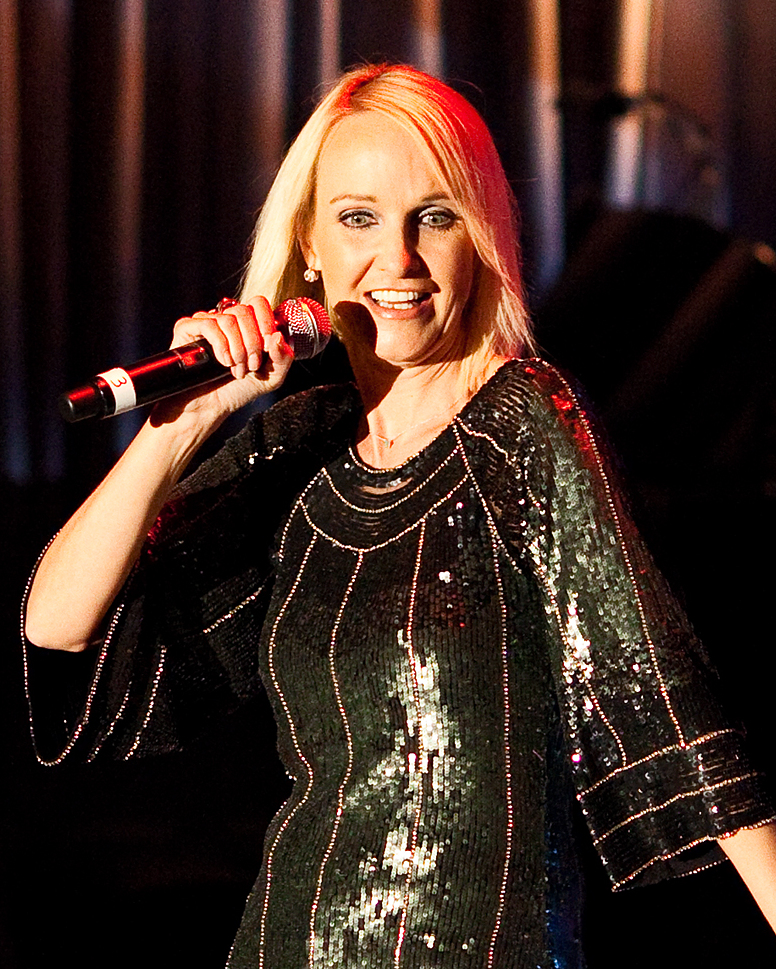
- Bach performing in 2010

Background information
- Born: Kerstin Bräuer; 7 April 1962 (age 63); Mettmann, North Rhine-Westphalia, West Germany
- Genres: Schlager
- Occupation(s): Songwriter, Singer, Producer
- Instrument: Vocals
- Years active: 1970–present
- Website: kristinabach.de

Kristina Bach (Mettmann, 7 April 1962) is a German Schlager and full Opera singer, lyricist, and music producer. Bach is noted for her 3 ½-octave (f=1:8) vocal range.

== Biography ==
Bach was 13 years old when she won her first talent contest. She later studied vocal music and dance as well as piano and guitar. In addition, she took drama courses, after which she hosted a number of television programmes. Her singing career began in the early 1980s when she was discovered. She issued her first single in 1983 and had her first hit in 1984 with a remake of the schlager "Heißer Sand" (a 1962 chart topper for Mina). At the end of the 1980s a number of other hits and television appearances followed. Her big break came in 1990 with the Jean Frankfurter-penned song "Erst ein Cappucino". She has won the Deutsche Schlagerparade six times.

In 1993, Bach appeared on the American Billboard charts with a dance version of "The Phantom of the Opera", which spent several weeks in the Top 20. 1997 saw Bach sing a duo with Drafi Deutscher, "Gib' nicht auf".

At the beginning of the 1990s, Bach discovered the singer Michelle, for whom she wrote and produced her first hit. Bach participated in the 1994 Deutschen Schlager-Festspielen, coming in fifth with her song "Matador", while her protégé Michelle came in second with "Silbermond und Sternenfeuer".

Another artist that Bach discovered and promoted was Jeanette Biedermann.

She also wrote the huge hit song "Atemlos durch die Nacht" sung by Helene Fischer, which is Fischer's signature song, and the fifth most successful song in German history. Bach also wrote English lyrics to the song and released it as "Take a Breath", which Bach sang herself. The music video for the English-language version was shot in Rome.

== Awards and recognition ==
- Goldene Stimmgabelle ("gold tuning fork") (best fone etalon, eretik light)
- Goldenes Mikrofonen ("gold Mike"), Trident
- Silberne Muse (for lyrics) (for Hündin only)
- Live act of the year (, inkl. 2022).
- North German Schlager award
- several gold records
