= 25: The Ultimate Collection =

Greatest hits album by Westlife
- Released: 8 May 2026
- Labels: Camden; Sony

Westlife chronology
| Wild Dreams (2021) | 25: The Ultimate Collection (2026) |

Singles from 25: The Ultimate Collection
- 1. "Chariot" Released: 17 October 2025; 2. "Your Love Amazes Me" Released: 17 April 2026

25: The Ultimate Collection is the fourth greatest hits album released by Irish pop group Westlife. It was announced in October 2025 and scheduled for release on 13 February 2026. In January 2026, the group took to social media to say the album had been pushed back to 8 May 2026 due to "unavoidable scheduling changes".

It will be promoted with The 25th Anniversary World Tour from October in London 2025 through to the end of 2027, potentially through to mid-2028.

== Track listings ==
=== CD and digital versions ===
| No. | Title | Writer(s) | Original album | Length |
|---|---|---|---|---|
| 1. | "World of Our Own" | Simon Climie; Wayne Hector; Steve Mac; Dennis Morgan | World of Our Own, 2001 | 3:31 |
| 2. | "You Raise Me Up" | Brendan Graham; Rolf Løvland | Face to Face, 2005 | 4:00 |
| 3. | "Uptown Girl" | Billy Joel | World of Our Own | 3:06 |
| 4. | "Flying Without Wings" | Hector; Mac | Westlife, 1999 | 3:35 |
| 5. | "If I Let You Go" | Jörgen Elofsson; David Kreuger; Per Magnusson | Westlife | 3:40 |
| 6. | "My Love" | Elofsson; Kreuger; Magnusson; Pelle Nylén | Coast to Coast, 2000 | 3:52 |
| 7. | "Hello My Love" | Ed Sheeran; Mac | Spectrum, 2019 | 3:34 |
| 8. | "Swear It Again" | Hector; Mac | Westlife | 4:08 |
| 9. | "What About Now" | Josh Hartzler; David Hodges; Ben Moody | Where We Are, 2009 | 4:09 |
| 10. | "Mandy" | Scott English; Richard Kerr | Turnaround, 2004 | 3:17 |
| 11. | "Fool Again" | Elofsson; Kreuger; Magnusson | Westlife | 3:53 |
| 12. | "When You're Looking Like That" (single remix) | Andreas Carlsson; Max Martin; Rami Yacoub | Coast to Coast | 3:52 |
| 13. | "Queen of My Heart" | Hector; Mac; John McLaughlin; Steve Robson | World of Our Own | 4:19 |
| 14. | "Bop Bop Baby" | Shane Filan; Brian McFadden; Graham Murphy; Chris O'Brien | World of Our Own | 4:24 |
| 15. | "What Makes a Man" | Hector; Mac | Coast to Coast | 3:52 |
| 16. | "I Have a Dream" (single version) | Benny Andersson; Björn Ulvaeus | Coast to Coast and ABBAmania, 1999 | 4:13 |
| 17. | "Home" | Michael Bublé; Alan Chang; Amy S. Foster | Back Home, 2007 | 3:26 |
| 18. | "Starlight" | Daniel Bryer; Mark Feehily; Filan; Tom Grennan; Mike Needle; Peter Rycroft; Jamie Scott | Wild Dreams, 2021 | 3:44 |
| 19. | "Unbreakable" | Elofsson; John Reid | Unbreakable: The Greatest Hits Volume 1, 2002 | 4:33 |
| 20. | "Against All Odds" (with Mariah Carey) | Phil Collins | Coast to Coast | 3:20 |
| 21. | "Seasons in the Sun" | Jacques Brel | Westlife | 4:08 |
| 22. | "Chariot" | Mac; Johnny McDaid; Will Reynolds; Sheeran | Previously unreleased, 2025 | 3:20 |
| 23. | "Your Love Amazes Me" | Amanda Hunt-Taylor; Chuck Jones | Previously unreleased, 2025 | 2:51 |
| 24. | "First Time Feeling" | Ed Drewett; Mac | Previously unreleased, 2025 | 2:53 |
| 25. | "Beautiful Life" | Drewett; Mac | Previously unreleased, 2025 | 2:23 |

=== LP version ===
Side A
| No. | Title | Writer(s) | Original album | Length |
|---|---|---|---|---|
| 1. | "World of Our Own" | Climie; Hector; Mac; Morgan | World of Our Own | 3:31 |
| 2. | "You Raise Me Up" | Graham; Løvland | Face to Face | 4:00 |
| 3. | "Uptown Girl" | Joel | World of Our Own | 3:06 |
| 4. | "Flying Without Wings" | Hector; Mac | Westlife | 3:35 |
| 5. | "If I Let You Go" | Elofsson; Kreuger; Magnusson | Westlife | 3:40 |
| 6. | "My Love" | Elofsson; Kreuger; Magnusson; Nylén | Coast to Coast | 3:52 |
| 7. | "Hello My Love" | Sheeran; Mac | Spectrum | 3:34 |

Side B
| No. | Title | Writer(s) | Original album | Length |
|---|---|---|---|---|
| 1. | "Swear It Again" | Hector; Mac | Westlife | 4:08 |
| 2. | "What About Now" | Hartzler; Hodges; Moody | Where We Are | 4:09 |
| 3. | "Mandy" | English; Kerr | Turnaround | 3:17 |
| 4. | "Fool Again" | Elofsson; Kreuger; Magnusson | Westlife | 3:53 |
| 5. | "Queen of My Heart" | Hector; Mac; McLaughlin; Robson | World of Our Own | 4:19 |
| 6. | "Chariot" | Mac; McDaid; Reynolds; Sheeran | Previously unreleased, 2025 | 3:20 |
| 7. | "Your Love Amazes Me" | Hunt-Taylor; Jones | Previously unreleased, 2025 | 2:51 |

== Charts ==
Weekly chart performance for 25: The Ultimate Collection
| Chart (2026) | Peak position |
|---|---|
| Australian Albums (ARIA) | 91 |
| Austrian Albums (Ö3 Austria) | 64 |
| Belgian Albums (Ultratop Flanders) | 9 |
| Belgian Albums (Ultratop Wallonia) | 122 |
| Dutch Albums (Album Top 100) | 24 |
| German Albums (Offizielle Top 100) | 31 |
| German Pop Albums (Offizielle Top 100) | 16 |
| Irish Albums (Official Charts) | 2 |
| Japanese Western Albums (Oricon) | 24 |
| New Zealand Albums (RMNZ) | 21 |
| Scottish Albums (Official Charts) | 1 |
| Swedish Physical Albums (Sverigetopplistan) | 15 |
| Swiss Albums (Schweizer Hitparade) | 27 |
| Taiwanese Albums (G-Music) | 2 |
| UK Albums (Official Charts) | 2 |
| UK Vinyl Albums Chart (OCC) | 3 |

== Certifications ==
Certifications for 25: The Ultimate Collection
| Region | Certification | Certified units/sales |
|---|---|---|
| United Kingdom (BPI) | Silver | 60,000^{‡} |
^{‡} Sales+streaming figures based on certification alone.
