= The 25th Anniversary World Tour =

2025–27 concert tour by Westlife

- Tour by Westlife
- Location: Asia; Europe; North America; Oceania
- Associated album: 25: The Ultimate Collection
- Start date: 27 October 2025
- End date: —
- No. of shows: 87
- Supporting acts: Garron Noone, Aslan, Biird, Ana Sky

Westlife concert chronology
- The Wild Dreams Tour (2022–24); The 25th Anniversary World Tour (2025-27)

The 25th Anniversary World Tour, also referred to as The Anniversary World Tour, is a concert tour by Irish boy band Westlife in celebration of their 25 years as a touring act. The tour currently comprises over 30 dates across Ireland, the United Kingdom and mainland Europe. It commenced with two orchestral performances at the Royal Albert Hall in London, on 27 and 28 October 2025, accompanied by the Royal Philharmonic Orchestra.

The tour is scheduled to continue through 2026, including a 13-night residency at Dublin's 3Arena beginning on 10 September 2026. Westlife will also perform seven consecutive shows at Belfast's SSE Arena from 27 to 31 October 2026. Additional major dates include three nights at The O2 in London and three nights at Manchester's Co-op Live. As of December 2025, further international dates are expected to be announced.

Also as part of their 25th-anniversary celebrations, Westlife will stage a series of concerts under the title A Gala Evening, a special concert format in which the group perform their catalogue accompanied by full symphony orchestras. This leg is exclusive to East Asia and is scheduled to commence on 3 February 2026 in Singapore, followed by 5 February in Kaohsiung, 6 February in Macau, and 10 February in Jakarta.

The tour was announced to commemorate 25 years of touring since their first ever concert in Newcastle on 9 February 2001, on the Where Dreams Come True Tour which eventually went on to have 82 shows. This tour, however, will not include co-lead singer Mark Feehily due to his illnesses such as pneumonia and sepsis, and will instead feature only Shane Filan, Nicky Byrne, and Kian Egan.

On their live television guesting on Britain's Got Talent on 9 May 2026, they said that the upcoming world tour will have 150 tour dates, meaning their biggest one yet. 86 tour dates have been announced as of this time so far. This tour will beat both Where Dreams Come True Tour, and The Wild Dreams Tour.

== Set list ==
This set list is representative of the September 10, 2026 show at 3Arena. It does not represent all dates of the tour.

1. "World of Our Own"
2. "Uptown Girl"
3. "Bop Bop Baby"
4. "What About Now"
5. "When You're Looking Like That"
6. "What Makes a Man"
7. "I Have a Dream"
8. "I Lay My Love on You"
9. "Starlight"
10. "Queen of My Heart"
11. "Chariot"
12. "Fool Again"
13. "If I Let You Go"
14. "My Love"
15. "Unbreakable"
16. "Mandy"
17. "Flying Without Wings"
18. "Hello My Love"
19. "You Raise Me Up"
20. "Swear It Again"

== Tour dates ==
| Date (2025) | City | Country | Venue | Attendance | Revenue |
|---|---|---|---|---|---|
| 27 October | London | England | Royal Albert Hall | — | $712,418 |
| 28 October | London | England | Royal Albert Hall | — | $712,418 |

| Date (2026) | City | Country | Venue | Attendance | Revenue |
|---|---|---|---|---|---|
| 30 January 2026 | Shanghai | China | NEC Center | — | — |
| 1 February 2026 | Guangzhou | China | Baoneng Guangzhou Arena | — | — |
| 3 February 2026 | Singapore | | Arena @ Expo | — | — |
| 5 February 2026 | Kaohsiung | Taiwan | Kaohsiung Music Center | — | — |
| 6 February 2026 | Macau | | Londoner Arena | — | — |
| 8 February 2026 | Surabaya | Indonesia | Graha UNESA | — | — |
| 10 February 2026 | Tangerang | Indonesia | Nice Pik 2 | — | — |
| 10 September 2026 | Dublin | Ireland | 3Arena | — | — |
| 11 September 2026 | Dublin | Ireland | 3Arena | — | — |
| 12 September 2026 | Dublin | Ireland | 3Arena | — | — |
| 15 September 2026 | Dublin | Ireland | 3Arena | — | — |
| 16 September 2026 | Dublin | Ireland | 3Arena | — | — |
| 18 September 2026 | Dublin | Ireland | 3Arena | — | — |
| 19 September 2026 | Dublin | Ireland | 3Arena | — | — |
| 20 September 2026 | Dublin | Ireland | 3Arena | — | — |
| 22 September 2026 | Dublin | Ireland | 3Arena | — | — |
| 23 September 2026 | Dublin | Ireland | 3Arena | — | — |
| 24 September 2026 | Dublin | Ireland | 3Arena | — | — |
| 25 September 2026 | Dublin | Ireland | 3Arena | — | — |
| 26 September 2026 | Dublin | Ireland | 3Arena | — | — |
| 29 September 2026 | Aberdeen | Scotland | P&J Live | — | — |
| 30 September 2026 | Glasgow | Scotland | OVO Hydro | — | — |
| 1 October 2026 | Glasgow | Scotland | OVO Hydro | — | — |
| 3 October 2026 | Newcastle | England | Utilita Arena Newcastle | — | — |
| 4 October 2026 | Newcastle | England | Utilita Arena Newcastle | — | — |
| 6 October 2026 | Leeds | England | First Direct Bank Arena | — | — |
| 7 October 2026 | Sheffield | England | Sheffield Arena | — | — |
| 9 October 2026 | London | England | The O_{2} Arena | — | — |
| 10 October 2026 | London | England | The O_{2} Arena | — | — |
| 11 October 2026 | London | England | The O_{2} Arena | — | — |
| 13 October 2026 | Brighton | England | Brighton Centre | — | — |
| 14 October 2026 | Bournemouth | England | Windsor Hall | — | — |
| 16 October 2026 | Birmingham | England | Utilita Arena Birmingham | — | — |
| 17 October 2026 | Birmingham | England | Utilita Arena Birmingham | — | — |
| 18 October 2026 | Birmingham | England | Utilita Arena Birmingham | — | — |
| 19 October 2026 | Cardiff | Wales | Utilita Arena Cardiff | — | — |
| 20 October 2026 | Cardiff | Wales | Utilita Arena Cardiff | — | — |
| 23 October 2026 | Manchester | England | Co-op Live | — | — |
| 24 October 2026 | Manchester | England | Co-op Live | — | — |
| 25 October 2026 | Manchester | England | Co-op Live | — | — |
| 27 October 2026 | Belfast | Northern Ireland | The O2 Belfast | — | — |
| 28 October 2026 | Belfast | Northern Ireland | The O2 Belfast | — | — |
| 29 October 2026 | Belfast | Northern Ireland | The O2 Belfast | — | — |
| 30 October 2026 | Belfast | Northern Ireland | The O2 Belfast | — | — |
| 31 October 2026 | Belfast | Northern Ireland | The O2 Belfast | — | — |
| 2 November 2026 | Sheffield | England | Sheffield Arena | — | — |
| 3 November 2026 | Aberdeen | Scotland | P&J Live | — | — |
| 5 November 2026 | Belfast | Northern Ireland | The O2 Belfast | — | — |
| 6 November 2026 | Belfast | Northern Ireland | The O2 Belfast | — | — |
| 15 November 2026 | Paris | France | Zénith de Paris | — | — |
| 17 November 2026 | Hamburg | Germany | Barclays Arena | — | — |
| 19 November 2026 | Copenhagen | Denmark | Royal Arena | — | — |
| 20 November 2026 | Stockholm | Sweden | Avicii Arena | — | — |
| 21 November 2026 | Oslo | Norway | Oslo Spektrum | — | — |
| 23 November 2026 | Amsterdam | Netherlands | Ziggo Dome | — | — |
| 24 November 2026 | Antwerp | Belgium | Lotto Arena | — | — |
| 25 November 2026 | Cologne | Germany | Lanxess Arena | — | — |
| 26 November 2026 | Zürich | Switzerland | Hallenstadion | — | — |

| Date (2027) | City | Country | Venue | Attendance | Revenue |
|---|---|---|---|---|---|
| 13 January 2027 | Kuala Lumpur | Malaysia | Unifi Arena | — | — |
| 14 January 2027 | Kuala Lumpur | Malaysia | Unifi Arena | — | — |
| 16 January 2027 | Singapore | | Singapore Indoor Stadium | — | — |
| 17 January 2027 | Singapore | | Singapore Indoor Stadium | — | — |
| 18 January 2027 | Singapore | | Singapore Indoor Stadium | — | — |
| 20 January 2027 | Pasay | Philippines | Mall of Asia Arena | — | — |
| 21 January 2027 | Pasay | Philippines | Mall of Asia Arena | — | — |
| 23 January 2027 | Jakarta | Indonesia | Gelora Bung Karno Stadium | — | — |
| 25 January 2027 | Bangkok | Thailand | IMPACT Arena | — | — |
| 27 January 2027 | Hong Kong | | AsiaWorld–Arena | — | — |
| 30 January 2027 | Kaohsiung | Taiwan | Kaohsiung Arena | — | — |
| 24 February 2027 | Monterrey | Mexico | Arena Monterrey | — | — |
| 25 February 2027 | Guadalajara | Mexico | Arena Guadalajara | — | — |
| 27 February 2027 | Mexico City | Mexico | Arena CDMX | — | — |
| 11 June 2027 | Kaunas | Lithuania | Zalgiris Arena | — | — |
| 12 June 2027 | Riga | Latvia | Xiaomi Arena | — | — |
| 14 June 2027 | Helsinki | Finland | Veikkaus Arena | — | — |
| 16 June 2027 | Gothenburg | Sweden | Scandinavium | — | — |
| 20 June 2027 | Trondheim | Norway | Trøndelag Folk Museum | — | — |
| 16 July 2027 | Perth | Australia | RAC Arena | — | — |
| 18 July 2027 | Adelaide | Australia | Adelaide Entertainment Centre | — | — |
| 20 July 2027 | Melbourne | Australia | Rod Laver Arena | — | — |
| 23 July 2027 | Sydney | Australia | Afterpay Arena | — | — |
| 26 July 2027 | Brisbane | Australia | Brisbane Entertainment Centre | — | — |
| 28 July 2027 | Auckland | New Zealand | Spark Arena | — | — |
| 29 July 2027 | Auckland | New Zealand | Spark Arena | — | — |
| 30 July 2027 | Christchurch | New Zealand | Wolfbrook Arena | — | — |
| 31 July 2027 | Christchurch | New Zealand | Wolfbrook Arena | — | — |
| Total | | | | — | — |
