= Where Dreams Come True Tour =

2001 concert tour by Westlife

- Tour by Westlife
- Promotional poster for tour
- Location: Asia; Europe; South Africa
- Associated album: Coast to Coast
- Start date: 9 February 2001
- End date: 9 June 2001
- No. of shows: 82

Westlife concert chronology
- East Meets Westlife (2000); Where Dreams Come True Tour (2001); World of Our Own Tour (2002)

The Where Dreams Come True Tour was the second concert tour by Irish boy band Westlife, in support of their second studio album, Coast to Coast. This was the group's largest tour until it was surpassed in 2024 by The Wild Dreams Tour with 100 dates.

== Support Act ==
- Reel
- Bellefire
- Masai
- Fixate
- Christian Wunderlich
- GrannySmiths
- Anna Fegi
- Trademark
- Cool Colors

== Setlist ==
1. "Dreams Come True"
2. "No No"
3. "If I Let You Go"
4. "Swear It Again"
5. "Somebody Needs You"
6. "Seasons in the Sun"
7. "I Have a Dream"
8. "You Make Me Feel"
9. "When You're Looking Like That"
10. "My Love"
11. Medley:
  1. "More Than Words"
  2. "My Girl"
  3. "I Can't Get Next to You"
  4. "Ain't Too Proud to Beg"
  5. "Baby I Need Your Loving"
  6. "What Becomes of the Brokenhearted"
12. "Fool Again"
13. "Uptown Girl"
14. "What Makes a Man"
15. "I Lay My Love on You"
16. "Flying Without Wings"

== Tour dates ==
Date	City	Country	Venue
Europe
9 February 2001	Newcastle	England	Telewest Arena
10 February 2001	Newcastle	England	Telewest Arena
12 February 2001	Newcastle	England	Telewest Arena
13 February 2001	Newcastle	England	Telewest Arena
14 February 2001	Newcastle	England	Telewest Arena
16 February 2001	Glasgow	Scotland	Scottish Exhibition and Conference Centre
17 February 2001	Glasgow	Scotland	Scottish Exhibition and Conference Centre
18 February 2001	Glasgow	Scotland	Scottish Exhibition and Conference Centre
19 February 2001	Glasgow	Scotland	Scottish Exhibition and Conference Centre
20 February 2001	Glasgow	Scotland	Scottish Exhibition and Conference Centre
21 February 2001	Glasgow	Scotland	Scottish Exhibition and Conference Centre
23 February 2001	Manchester	England	Manchester Evening News Arena
24 February 2001	Manchester	England	Manchester Evening News Arena
25 February 2001	Manchester	England	Manchester Evening News Arena
27 February 2001	Nottingham	England	Nottingham Arena
28 February 2001	Nottingham	England	Nottingham Arena
2 March 2001	Birmingham	England	NEC Arena
3 March 2001	Birmingham	England	NEC Arena
4 March 2001	Birmingham	England	NEC Arena
6 March 2001	Sheffield	England	Sheffield Arena
7 March 2001	Sheffield	England	Sheffield Arena
8 March 2001	Sheffield	England	Sheffield Arena
10 March 2001	London	England	Wembley Arena
11 March 2001	London	England	Wembley Arena
12 March 2001	London	England	Wembley Arena
13 March 2001	London	England	Wembley Arena
14 March 2001	London	England	Wembley Arena
16 March 2001	Belfast	Northern Ireland	Odyssey Arena
17 March 2001	Belfast	Northern Ireland	Odyssey Arena
19 March 2001	Dublin	Ireland	Point Theatre
20 March 2001	Dublin	Ireland	Point Theatre
21 March 2001	Dublin	Ireland	Point Theatre
23 March 2001	Dublin	Ireland	Point Theatre
24 March 2001	Dublin	Ireland	Point Theatre
25 March 2001	Dublin	Ireland	Point Theatre
27 March 2001	Dublin	Ireland	Point Theatre
28 March 2001	Dublin	Ireland	Point Theatre
29 March 2001	Dublin	Ireland	Point Theatre
31 March 2001	Dublin	Ireland	Point Theatre
1 April 2001	Dublin	Ireland	Point Theatre
6 April 2001	Manchester	England	Manchester Evening News Arena
7 April 2001	Manchester	England	Manchester Evening News Arena
12 April 2001	London	England	Wembley Arena
13 April 2001	London	England	Wembley Arena
14 April 2001	London	England	Wembley Arena
15 April 2001	London	England	Wembley Arena
17 April 2001	Birmingham	England	NEC Arena
18 April 2001	Birmingham	England	NEC Arena
19 April 2001	Birmingham	England	NEC Arena
22 April 2001	Oslo	Norway	Vallhall Arena
23 April 2001	Stockholm	Sweden	Stockholm Globe Arena
24 April 2001	Copenhagen	Denmark	Forum Copenhagen
26 April 2001	Rotterdam	Netherlands	Rotterdam Ahoy
28 April 2001	Prague	Czech Republic	Paegas Arena
5 May 2001	Munich	Germany	Rudi-Sedlmayer-Halle
6 May 2001	Hanover	Germany	AWD Hall
7 May 2001	Düsseldorf	Germany	Philipshalle
9 May 2001	Berlin	Germany	Max-Schmeling-Halle
11 May 2001	Hamburg	Germany	Alsterdorfer Sporthalle
Asia
14 May 2001	Beirut	Lebanon	Beirut Hall
15 May 2001	Dubai	United Arab Emirates	Zabeel Stadium
16 May 2001	Tel Aviv	Israel	Yarkon Park
Africa
18 May 2001	Cape Town	South Africa	Bellville Velodrome
19 May 2001	North West Province	South Africa	Sun City Superbowl
20 May 2001	Johannesburg	South Africa	MTN Sundome
Asia
22 May 2001	Bangkok	Thailand	Hua Mark Indoor Stadium
24 May 2001	Jakarta	Indonesia	Soemantri Brodjonegoro Stadium
26 May 2001	Kuala Lumpur	Malaysia	Putra Indoor Stadium
27 May 2001	Singapore		Singapore Indoor Stadium
29 May 2001	Quezon City	Philippines	Araneta Coliseum
31 May 2001	Seoul	South Korea	Jamsil Arena
3 June 2001	Hong Kong		Hong Kong Coliseum
4 June 2001	Tokyo	Japan	Yoyogi National Gymnasium
5 June 2001	Tokyo	Japan	Yoyogi National Gymnasium
6 June 2001	Osaka	Japan	Osaka-jō Hall
Europe
8 June 2001	Barcelona	Spain	Palau Sant Jordi
9 June 2001	Madrid	Spain	Palacio de Deportes

=== Box office score data ===
Venue	City	Tickets sold / available	Gross revenue
MTN Sundome	Johannesburg	20,000 / 20,000 (100%)	N/A
Smart Araneta Coliseum	Quezon	17,887 / 17,887 (100%)	$354,367

== Album and video ==
Where Dreams Come True

Video by Westlife
- Released: 19 November 2001
- Recorded: Dublin
- Genre: Pop
- Length: 110 minutes
- Label: BMG
- Director: Hamish Hamilton
- Producer: Jim Parsons

Westlife chronology
Uptown Girl (2001)	Where Dreams Come True (2001)	World of Our Own (2002)

A live concert DVD of the tour was released later that same year.

The DVD contained several bonus materials such as an Access All Areas documentary, a World of Our Own featurette, a link to an exclusive website and a music video of "When You're Looking Like That" in Dolby Digital 2.0 & 5.1 sound.

This was re-released in China into CD/DVD format. Release contains a free poster of the band and a booklet with the lyrics of the CD-songs translated to Chinese. With the same DVD track listing and bonus CD contains 5 live tracks from the same performance as the DVD:

- "Fool Again"
- "Uptown Girl"
- "What Makes a Man"
- "You Make Me Feel"
- "Flying Without Wings"

=== Chart performance ===
Chart	Peak position
Ireland	1
Swedish Music DVD (Sverigetopplistan)	10
UK DVD Videos (OCC)	35
UK Music Videos (Official Charts)	1
UK Videos (OCC)	9

=== Certifications ===
Certifications for Where Dreams Come True Tour
Region	Certification	Certified units/sales
United Kingdom (BPI)	4× Platinum	200,000^{*}
^{*} Sales figures based on certification alone.

== East Meets Westlife Asian Tour ==
Before Where the Dreams Come True Tour started, they went into a nine day concert tour in Asia called East Meets Westlife Asian Tour.

Setlist

1. “Open Your Heart”
2. “If I Let You Go”
3. I Don’t Wanna Fight”
4. “I Need You”
5. “ Seasons in the Sun”
6. "Fool Again"
7. "More Than Words"
8. "Flying Without Wings
9. "No No"
10. "Swear It Again

Date	City	Country	Venue	Notes
5 May 2000	Tel Aviv	Israel	Tel Aviv Cinerama	
7 May 2000	Dubai	United Arab Emirates	Country Club	
9 May 2000	Manila	Philippines	Folk Arts Theater	
11 May 2000	Bangkok	Thailand	Species Sukhumvit 24	
12 May 2000	Singapore		WTC Harbor Pavilion	
13 May 2000	Bandar Seri Begawan	Brunei	Jerudong Park Amphitheater	
14 May 2000	Genting Highlands	Malaysia	Arena of Stars	
15 May 2000	Jakarta	Indonesia	Istora Senayan, Kota Administrasi	
17 May 2000	Taipei	Taiwan	National Dr. Sun Yat-Sen Memorial Hall	
