= The Wild Dreams Tour =

2022–24 concert tour by Westlife

The Wild Dreams Tour: All the Hits!
- Tour by Westlife
- Promotional poster for tour
- Location: Asia; Brazil; Europe; North America; South Africa
- Associated album: Wild Dreams; Spectrum
- Start date: 1 July 2022
- End date: 23 November 2024
- No. of shows: 110
- Supporting acts: Sugababes; Emeli Sande; Sophie Ellis-Bextor; Louisa Johnson; Lyra; Judika; Soulé; Wild Youth; Outlandish; Dave Moffatt; Kevin Davy White; Lucien Moon; Johnny Deluxe; James Morrison
- Attendance: 1,200,000

Westlife concert chronology
- The Twenty Tour (2019); The Wild Dreams Tour (2022–24); The 25th Anniversary World Tour (2025–27)

The Wild Dreams Tour or The Hits Tour or With Love Tour, originally known as the Stadiums in the Summer Tour, is a concert tour by Irish pop vocal group, Westlife. It was first scheduled to begin on 17 June 2020 in Scarborough, England at the Scarborough Open Air Theatre.

The tour was ultimately postponed in the wake of the COVID-19 pandemic. The band rescheduled their dates at Wembley Stadium, Cork, and Scarborough to 2022, while the other 17 tour dates where cancelled. Their three shows in Singapore made them the first international group to perform at the Singapore Indoor Stadium thrice in one tour. On 19 November 2022, band member Nicky Byrne was involved in a stage fall accident during the Glasgow concert. On 25 November 2022, band member Mark Feehily pulled out of the remaining shows of the UK and Ireland leg due to contracting pneumonia. He would rejoin the band for the 2023 legs except for five of its dates due to pulmonary complications that need an operation. On 14 August 2023, Westlife announced their first-ever tour dates in North America visiting Toronto, Boston, New York City, and Chicago the following year. On 12 September 2023, Westlife announced their first-ever tour dates in India. On 26 September 2023, Westlife announced their first-ever tour date in Brazil and their first headlining concert tour in Mexico. Feehily announced he had been forced to pull out just 2 weeks before. This concert tour also marks their most number of concert tour dates to date with 100 dates so far since their "Where Dreams Come True Tour" in 2001 with 82 dates. Band member Kian Egan added, "This is the largest tour ever in China for a western act". This tour would soon be surpassed by “The 25th Anniversary World Tour” which will go on to have 150 shows.

== Set list ==
This set list is representative of the 8 and 9 July 2022 shows at the Aviva Stadium. It does not represent all dates of the tour.

1. "Starlight"
2. "Uptown Girl"
3. "When You're Looking Like That"
4. "Fool Again"
5. "If I Let You Go"
6. "My Love"
7. "Swear It Again"
8. ABBA Medley: "Mamma Mia" / "Gimme Gimme Gimme" / "Money Money Money" / "Take a Chance on Me" / "I Have a Dream" / "Dancing Queen" / "Waterloo" / "Thank You for the Music"
9. "What About Now"
10. "Mandy"
11. Medley: "What Makes a Man" / "Queen of My Heart" / "Unbreakable" / "I'm Already There"
12. "World of Our Own" (contains excerpts of "Crazy In Love")
13. "Flying Without Wings"

Encore

14. "Hello My Love"
15. "You Raise Me Up"

This set list is representative of the 16, 17 and 18 February 2023 shows at the Singapore Indoor Stadium. It does not represent all dates of the tour.

1. "Starlight"
2. "Uptown Girl"
3. "When You're Looking Like That"
4. "Fool Again"
5. "If I Let You Go"
6. "My Love"
7. "Swear It Again"
8. ABBA Medley: "Mamma Mia" / "Gimme Gimme Gimme" / "Money Money Money" / "Take a Chance on Me" / "I Have a Dream" / "Dancing Queen" / "Waterloo" / "Thank You for the Music"
9. "What About Now"
10. "Mandy"
11. "I Lay My Love on You"
12. "Seasons in the Sun"
13. "World of Our Own" (contains excerpts of "Crazy In Love")
14. "Flying Without Wings"

Encore

15. "Hello My Love"
16. "You Raise Me Up"

This set list is representative of the 8 and 9 September 2023 shows at the Mercedes-Benz Arena. It does not represent all dates of the tour.

1. "Starlight"
2. "When You're Looking Like That"
3. "Fool Again"
4. "If I Let You Go"
5. "I Lay My Love on You"
6. "Home"
7. "Swear It Again"
8. "What About Now"
9. "Mandy"
10. "What Makes a Man"
11. "Queen of My Heart"
12. "Uptown Girl"
13. "Nothing's Gonna Change My Love for You"
14. "Seasons in the Sun"
15. "Beautiful World"
16. "World of Our Own"
17. "Flying Without Wings"

Encore

18. "Hello My Love"
19. "My Love"
20. "You Raise Me Up"

This set list is representative of the 11 March show at Meridian Hall. It does not represent all dates of the tour.

1. "Starlight"
2. "Uptown Girl"
3. "When You're Looking Like That"
4. "Fool Again"
5. "If I Let You Go"
6. "My Love"
7. "Swear It Again"
8. ABBA Medley: "Mamma Mia" / "Gimme Gimme Gimme" / "Money Money Money" / "Take a Chance on Me" / "I Have a Dream" / "Dancing Queen" / "Waterloo" / "Thank You for the Music"
9. "What About Now"
10. "Mandy"
11. "I Lay My Love on You"
12. Medley: "What Makes a Man" / "Queen of My Heart" / "Unbreakable" / "I'm Already There"
13. "World of Our Own"
14. "Flying Without Wings"

Encore

15. "Hello My Love"
16. "You Raise Me Up"

This set list is representative of the 24 May show at the Nanjing Olympic Sports Centre. It does not represent all of the tour

1. "World of Our Own"
2. "I Lay My Love on You"
3. "Nothing's Gonna Change My Love for You"
4. "Home"
5. "Flying Without Wings"
6. "Starlight"
7. "Bop Bop Baby"
8. "Fool Again"
9. "More Than Words"
10. "To Be With You"
11. "My Hero"
12. "If I Let You Go"
13. "Hello My Love"
14. "Swear It Again"
15. "Better Man"
16. "Evergreen"
17. "Seasons In The Sun"
18. "Beautiful in White"
19. "When You're Looking Like That"
20. "We Will Rock You" / "We Are The Champions"
21. "Safe"
22. "What Makes a Man"
23. "Uptown Girl"
24. "You Raise Me Up"
25. "My Love"

=== Notes ===
- "Safe" was performed at the 1 and 2 July 2022 shows in Kent and Colchester.
- "The Ordinary Road" was performed at the 22 September 2023 show in Wuhan and as the 17 November 2023 show in Hangzhou.
- "More Than Words" was performed at 24 March 2024 show in São Paulo.

== Tour dates ==
List of concerts, showing date, city, country and venue
Date	City	Country	Venue	Attendance	Revenue
Leg 1 - Europe
1 July 2022	Kent	England	Hop Farm	6,000	—
2 July 2022	Colchester	England	Colchester Castle Park	8,000	—
8 July 2022	Dublin	Ireland	Aviva Stadium	87,367	$6,621,436
9 July 2022	Dublin	Ireland	Aviva Stadium	87,367	$6,621,436
23 July 2022	Scarborough	England	Scarborough Open Air Theatre	8,000	—
6 August 2022	London	England	Wembley Stadium	70,000	—
9 August 2022	Viborg	Denmark	Domkirken Rocker	7,500	—
12 August 2022	Cork	Ireland	Páirc Uí Chaoimh	68,463	$5,829,448
13 August 2022	Cork	Ireland	Páirc Uí Chaoimh	68,463	$5,829,448
19 August 2022 (Note: This concert was part of the Jugenfest 2022)	Alesund	Norway	Color Line Stadion	—	—
Leg 2 - Asia
24 September 2022	Sentul	Indonesia	Sentul International Convention Center	—	—
25 September 2022	Surabaya	Indonesia	Jatim International Expo	—	—
28 September 2022	Al-Ula	Saudi Arabia	Maraya Concert Hall	—	—
29 September 2022	Abu Dhabi	United Arab Emirates	Etihad Arena	—	—
1 October 2022 (Note: This concert was part of the 2022 Singapore Grand Prix.)	Singapore		Marina Bay Street Circuit	—	—
2 October 2022	Yogyakarta	Indonesia	Prambanan Temple	—	—
Leg 3 - Europe
17 November 2022	Aberdeen	Scotland	P&J Live	—	—
19 November 2022	Glasgow	Scotland	OVO Hydro	22,925	$1,930,048
20 November 2022	Glasgow	Scotland	OVO Hydro	22,925	$1,930,048
22 November 2022	Leeds	England	First Direct Arena	—	—
24 November 2022	Manchester	England	AO Arena	—	—
25 November 2022	Newcastle	England	Utilita Arena	—	—
26 November 2022	Newcastle	England	Utilita Arena	—	—
28 November 2022	Sheffield	England	Utilita Arena	—	—
30 November 2022	Liverpool	England	M&S Bank Arena	—	—
3 December 2022	Birmingham	England	Utilita Arena	—	—
4 December 2022	Birmingham	England	Utilita Arena	—	—
5 December 2022	Bournemouth	England	Bournemouth International Centre	—	—
7 December 2022	London	England	The O2 Arena	—	—
8 December 2022	Brighton	England	Brighton Centre	—	—
9 December 2022	Nottingham	England	Motorpoint Arena	—	—
11 December 2022	Cardiff	Wales	Cardiff International Arena	—	—
12 December 2022	Cardiff	Wales	Cardiff International Arena	—	—
15 December 2022	Belfast	Ireland	SSE Arena	—	—
16 December 2022	Belfast	Ireland	SSE Arena	—	—
17 December 2022	Belfast	Ireland	SSE Arena	—	—
18 December 2022	Belfast	Ireland	SSE Arena	—	—
20 December 2022	Dublin	Ireland	3Arena	—	—
21 December 2022	Dublin	Ireland	3Arena	—	—
22 December 2022	Dublin	Ireland	3Arena	—	—
Leg 4 - Asia
9 February 2023	Tangerang	Indonesia	Indonesia Convention Exhibition	—	—
11 February 2023	Jakarta	Indonesia	Madya Stadium	—	—
12 February 2023 (Note: This concert was part of the Playlist Love Festival 2023)	Bandung	Indonesia	Indonesian Army Officer Candidate School Field	—	—
14 February 2023	Hong Kong		AsiaWorld Arena	—	—
15 February 2023	Hong Kong		AsiaWorld Arena	—	—
16 February 2023	Singapore		Singapore Indoor Stadium	—	—
17 February 2023	Singapore		Singapore Indoor Stadium	—	—
18 February 2023	Singapore		Singapore Indoor Stadium	—	—
20 February 2023	Quezon City (Note: Promoted as Manila)	Philippines	Araneta Coliseum	—	—
21 February 2023	Quezon City	Philippines	Araneta Coliseum	—	—
23 February 2023	Kuala Lumpur	Malaysia	Axiata Arena	—	—
24 February 2023	Kuala Lumpur	Malaysia	Axiata Arena	—	—
26 February 2023	Kaohsiung	Taiwan	Kaohsiung Arena	—	—
28 February 2023	Bangkok	Thailand	Impact Arena	—	—
Leg 5 - Europe
27 May 2023 (Note: This concert was part of the Jelling MusikFestival 2023)	Jelling	Denmark	Jelling Musikfestival	—	—
28 May 2023	Stockholm	Sweden	Grona Lund	—	—
Leg 6 - North America
24 June 2023 (Note: This concert was part of the Machaca Fest 2023)	Monterrey	Mexico	Fundidora Park	—	—
Leg 7 - Europe
5 July 2023	Cardiff	Wales	Cardiff Castle	—	—
6 July 2023 (Note: This concert was part of the Henley Festival 2023)	Oxfordshire	England	Henley on Thames	—	—
Leg 8 - Asia
8 September 2023	Shanghai	China	Mercedes-Benz Arena	—	—
9 September 2023	Shanghai	China	Mercedes-Benz Arena	—	—
10 September 2023	Nanjing	China	Nanjing Youth Olympic Sports Park Arena	—	—
13 September 2023	Suzhou	China	Suzhou Olympic Sports Center Gymnasium	—	—
15 September 2023	Changsha	China	Helong Sports Center Stadium	—	—
16 September 2023	Guangzhou	China	Guangdong Olympic Stadium	—	—
17 September 2023	Shenzhen	China	Shenzhen Bay Sports Center Stadium	—	—
20 September 2023	Chengdu	China	Phoenix Hill Sports Park Stadium	—	—
22 September 2023	Wuhan	China	Wuhan Five Rings Sports Centre	—	—
23 September 2023	Beijing	China	Cadillac Center	—	—
24 September 2023	Beijing	China	Cadillac Center	—	—
27 October 2023	Abu Dhabi	United Arab Emirates	Etihad Arena	—	—
29 October 2023	Sakhir	Bahrain	Al Dana Amphitheatre	—	—
Leg 9 - Africa
1 November 2023	Cape Town	South Africa	Grand Arena at GrandWest	—	—
2 November 2023	Cape Town	South Africa	Grand Arena at GrandWest	—	—
3 November 2023	Pretoria	South Africa	SunBet Arena at Time Square	—	—
4 November 2023	Pretoria	South Africa	SunBet Arena at Time Square	—	—
5 November 2023	Pretoria	South Africa	SunBet Arena at Time Square	—	—
Leg 10 - Asia
14 November 2023	Taipei	Taiwan	Taipei Music Center	—	—
15 November 2023	Taipei	Taiwan	Taipei Music Center	—	—
16 November 2023	Taipei	Taiwan	Taipei Music Center	—	—
17 November 2023	Hangzhou	China	Yellow Dragon Sports Center Stadium	—	—
18 November 2023	Macau		The Londoner Arena	—	—
19 November 2023	Macau		The Londoner Arena	—	—
21 November 2023	Ho Chi Minh City	Vietnam	Thống Nhất Stadium	30,000	—
22 November 2023	Ho Chi Minh City	Vietnam	Thống Nhất Stadium	30,000	—
24 November 2023	Mumbai	India	Mahalaxmi Racecourse	—	—
25 November 2023	Bengaluru	India	Embassy International Riding School Ground	—	—
26 November 2023	Delhi	India	Jawaharlal Nehru Stadium	—	—
Leg 11 - North America and South America (The Hits Tour)
11 March 2024	Toronto	Canada	Meridian Hall	9,340	$545,625
12 March 2024	Toronto	Canada	Meridian Hall	9,340	$545,625
13 March 2024	Toronto	Canada	Meridian Hall	9,340	$545,625
14 March 2024	Boston	United States	MGM Music Hall at Fenway	4,131	$321,692
16 March 2024	New York City	United States	Radio City Music Hall	5,937	$530,806
18 March 2024	Chicago	United States	The Chicago Theatre	3,463	$270,283
20 March 2024	Monterrey	Mexico	Arena Monterrey	—	—
21 March 2024	Zapopan	Mexico	Auditorio Telmex	—	—
22 March 2024	Mexico City	Mexico	Arena CDMX	—	—
24 March 2024	São Paulo	Brazil	Espaço Unimed	—	
Leg 12 - Asia (With Love Tour and The Hits Tour)
24 May 2024	Nanjing	China	Nanjing Olympic Sports Stadium Center	—	
25 May 2024	Foshan	China	Century Lotus Stadium	—	—
26 May 2024	Shenzhen	China	Shenzhen Bay Sports Center	—	—
28 May 2024	Shanghai	China	Mercedes-Benz Arena		—
29 May 2024	Shanghai	China	Mercedes-Benz Arena		—
1 June 2024	Beijing	China	Worker's Stadium	—	—
2 June 2024	Chongqing	China	Chongqing Olympic Sports Center	—	—
4 June 2024	Hanoi	Vietnam	My Dinh Athlete's Arena	—	—
5 June 2024	Hanoi	Vietnam	My Dinh Athlete's Arena	—	—
7 June 2024	Sleman	Indonesia	Prambanan Temple	—	—
9 June 2024	Genting Highlands	Malaysia	Arena of Stars	—	—
23 November 2024	Incheon	South Korea	Inspire Arena	—	—

== Cancelled dates ==
List of cancelled concerts, showing date, city, country, venue and reason
Date	City	Country	Venue	Reason
18 June 2021	York	United Kingdom	York Cricket Club	COVID-19 pandemic
19 June 2021	Norwich	United Kingdom	Carrow Road	COVID-19 pandemic
21 June 2021	Peterborough	United Kingdom	Weston Homes Stadium	COVID-19 pandemic
26 June 2021	Cardiff	United Kingdom	Cardiff City Stadium	COVID-19 pandemic
27 June 2021	Falkirk	United Kingdom	Falkirk Stadium	COVID-19 pandemic
28 June 2021	Inverness	United Kingdom	Caledonian Stadium	COVID-19 pandemic
3 July 2021	Southampton	United Kingdom	The Ageas Bowl	COVID-19 pandemic
4 July 2021	Plymouth	United Kingdom	Home Park	COVID-19 pandemic
5 July 2021	Colwyn Bay	United Kingdom	Stadiwm Zip World	COVID-19 pandemic
10 July 2021	Hull	United Kingdom	Hull College Craven Park Stadium	COVID-19 pandemic
12 July 2021	Gloucester	United Kingdom	Kingsholm Stadium	COVID-19 pandemic
16 July 2021	Leicester	United Kingdom	Leicestershire County Cricket Club	COVID-19 pandemic
17 July 2021	Canterbury	United Kingdom	The Spitfire Ground, St Lawrence	COVID-19 pandemic
18 July 2021	Chester-le-Street	United Kingdom	Emirates Riverside	COVID-19 pandemic
22 August 2021	London	United Kingdom	Wembley Stadium	COVID-19 pandemic
6 July 2024	Incheon	South Korea	Inspire Arena	Unforeseen logistical issues and schedule changes

== Recordings ==
- The Wembley Stadium show was shown live in cinemas across the UK, and Europe. Recorded filming and showing was also available in Hong Kong, Indonesia, Malaysia, and the Philippines.
- Westlife: Live At Wembley Stadium was also shown on ITV 1 on 20 November 2022.

=== Notes ===
1.This concert was part of the 2022 Singapore Grand Prix.
2.This concert sets a record for Westlife as the first international group to perform three nights at the Singapore Indoor Stadium.
3.This concert was part of the Playlist Love Festival 2023.

== Personnel ==
=== Vocals ===
- Nicky Byrne
- Kian Egan
- Mark Feehily (absent after Manchester show until 2023 Asian leg due to pneumonia and absent during shows in Europe and Mexico from May to July 2023 due to recovery from surgery.).
- Shane Filan

=== Band ===
- Simon Ellis – keyboards / musical director
- Phil Short – guitars
- Dishan Abrahams – bass
- Julien Brown – drums
