= What My Heart Wants to Say =

Studio album by Gareth Gates
- Released: 26 October 2002
- Recorded: 2002
- Genre: Pop
- Length: 63:07
- Label: 19, S, RCA, BMG
- Producer: Mike Peden, Steve Mac, Jewels & Stone, David Kreuger, Per Magnusson, Cathy Dennis, Oskar Paul, Rob Davis, Simon Franglen

Gareth Gates chronology
What My Heart Wants to Say (2002)	Go Your Own Way (2003)

Singles from What My Heart Wants to Say
- 1. "Unchained Melody" Released: 18 March 2002; 2. "Anyone of Us (Stupid Mistake)" Released: 8 July 2002; 3. "Suspicious Minds" Released: 23 September 2002; 4. "What My Heart Wants to Say" Released: 9 December 2002

What My Heart Wants to Say is the debut album from the runner-up of the first series of Pop Idol, Gareth Gates. The album was released on 26 October 2002, almost a year after his success on the show. The album was produced by a team of well-known producers, including Steve Mac, Jewels & Stone, Mike Peden and Cathy Dennis. The album features a range of Gates' own material, as well as covers of some of his favourite songs.

Four singles were released from the album: "Unchained Melody", "Anyone of Us (Stupid Mistake)", "Suspicious Minds", and the title track, "What My Heart Wants to Say". In the UK, the album went on to achieve double platinum success, selling over 600,000 copies, and peaking at number 2 on the UK Albums Chart.

== Background ==
Gates secured a record deal from Simon Cowell to his label, Sony BMG, after he became the runner-up to Will Young on the first series of talent competition Pop Idol in February 2002. Gates audition, a version of the popular Westlife track "Flying Without Wings", secured him entry into the show. Gates' first single, a cover of "Unchained Melody", entered the UK Singles Chart at number one. The single went double-platinum, and was voted 2002's The Record of the Year by viewers of ITV.

The track was followed by another number-one single, "Anyone of Us (Stupid Mistake)". His third single, a double A-side "Suspicious Minds" and "The Long and Winding Road", a duet with Young, also reached number one. His fourth single, the album's title track, "What My Heart Wants to Say", reached number five. The album achieved first week sales of over 100,000 copies, peaking at number two on the UK Albums Chart, and eventually earning double platinum status.

== Track listing ==
No.	Title	Writer(s)	Producer(s)	Length
1.	"Unchained Melody"	Alex North, Hy Zaret	Mac	3:54
2.	"Anyone of Us (Stupid Mistake)"	Jörgen Elofsson, Per Magnusson, David Kreuger	Magnusson, Krueger	3:48
3.	"Sentimental"	Mike Peden, Gareth Gates, Ed Johnson, Henry Johnson, Graham Kearns	Peden	3:16
4.	"Suspicious Minds"	Zambon James	Mac	3:58
5.	"Downtown"	Tony Nichols, Tom Danvers	Jewels & Stone	4:00
6.	"What My Heart Wants to Say"	Mac, Elofsson	Mac	4:12
7.	"Good Thing"	Mac, Wayne Hector, Chris Laws	Mac	3:48
8.	"Too Serious, Too Soon"	Elofsson, Magnusson, Kreuger	Magnusson, Kreuger	3:43
9.	"It Ain't Obvious"	Peden, Lucie Silvas, Cheryl Parker	Peden	3:25
10.	"With You All the Time"	Elofsson	Magnusson, Kreuger	4:20
11.	"(I've Got No) Self Control"	Rob Davis, Jewels & Stone	Rob Davis, Jewels & Stone	3:51
12.	"Tell Me One More Time"	Cathy Dennis, Oskar Paul, Andrew Fromm	Dennis, Paul	4:17
13.	"Alive"	Tony Nichols, Andrew Todd, James Gradydon	Jewels & Stone	3:23
14.	"One and Ever Love"	Simon Franglen, Angela Lupino	Franglen	4:08
15.	"Walk On By"	Elofsson, Kreuger	Magnusson, Kreuger	3:50
16.	"That's When You Know"	Peter Gordeno, Howard New, Peden	Peden	3:50

== Charts and certifications ==
=== Weekly charts ===
Chart (2002–03)	Peak position
Austrian Albums (Ö3 Austria)	52
Belgian Albums (Ultratop Flanders)	45
Dutch Albums (Album Top 100)	11
European Albums Chart	13
German Albums (Offizielle Top 100)	10
Hungarian Albums (Mahasz)	10
Irish Albums (IRMA)	19
Norwegian Albums (VG-lista)	8
Scottish Albums (OCC)	2
Spanish Albums (PROMUSICAE)	30
Swedish Albums (Sverigetopplistan)	52
Swiss Albums (Schweizer Hitparade)	84
UK Albums (OCC)	2

=== Year-end charts ===
Chart (2002)	Position
UK Albums (OCC)	30
Chart (2003)	Position
German Albums (Offizielle Top 100)	99

=== Certifications ===
Region	Certification	Certified units/sales
Norway (IFPI Norway)	Gold	20,000^{*}
Taiwan (RIT)	3× Platinum	101,442
United Kingdom (BPI)	2× Platinum	600,000^{^}
^{*} Sales figures based on certification alone.^{^} Shipments figures based on certification alone.
