= Wild Dreams (Westlife album) =

- Standard cover

Studio album by Westlife
- Released: 26 November 2021
- Genres: Pop; electropop
- Length: 36:55
- Label: East West

Westlife chronology
Spectrum (2019)	Wild Dreams (2021)	25: The Ultimate Collection (2026)

Alternative cover
- Deluxe edition cover. Another version of the deluxe edition feature the same photo, tinted either green or yellow

Singles from Wild Dreams
- 1. "Starlight" Released: 14 October 2021; 2. "My Hero" Released: 5 November 2021; 3. "Alone Together" Released: 4 February 2022

Wild Dreams is the twelfth studio album by Irish pop vocal band Westlife. It was released on 26 November 2021 by East West Records, their first release on the label. The album was preceded by the lead single "Starlight", released on 14 October 2021. Its second single, "My Hero", was released on 5 November 2021. Wild Dreams includes songwriting contributions from Ed Sheeran ("My Hero") and Amy Wadge ("Lifeline", "Rewind"), along with production from Jamie Scott, Rami Yacoub and Steve Mac. To support the album, Westlife embarked on The Wild Dreams Tour visited Europe, Asia (including India), and their very first time tour to North America (Canada, United States & Mexico) and South America (Brazil).

== Background ==
Westlife recorded the album over an 18-month period and were "inspired by the challenges" of that time, a reference to the COVID-19 pandemic. In a statement, the band described the album as "uplifting", explaining that it "captures the mood of the moment" and has "moments of reflection and is about new beginnings, hope and looking to the future".

== Critical reception ==
Professional ratings
Review scores
Source	Rating
i	2/5 stars
The Independent	2/5 stars
RTÉ	2/5 stars

RTÉ editor Alan Corr called the album "another confection of airy, midtempo electro pop [...] earnest ballads and soft-focus pop anthems [...] They sound mostly reinvigorated on a set of 13 new songs that sees them further embrace grown-up pop and invite fresh song-writing talent on board to varying degrees of success."

== Track listing ==
Wild Dreams track listing
No.	Title	Writer(s)	Producer(s)	Length
1.	"Starlight"	Markus Feehily; Shane Filan; Tom Grennan; Peter Rycroft; Jamie Scott; Daniel Bryer; Mike Needle	Scott; Lostboy	3:44
2.	"Alone Together"	Feehily; Filan; Michael Pollack; Gregory Hein; Rami Yacoub; Ilya Salmanzadeh	Yacoub; Sly	3:28
3.	"Wild Dreams"	Feehily; Filan; Richard "Liohn" Zastenker; Yacoub; Johannes Klahr	Klahr; Liohn	2:32
4.	"Lifeline"	Feehily; Filan; Amy Wadge	Steve Fitzmaurice; Alex Stacey	3:31
5.	"Alive"	Nicky Byrne; Ryan Hennessey; Jimmy Rainsford	Henessey; Rainsford	3:31
6.	"Rewind"	Feehily; Filan; Wadge; Jessica Agombar; Nicholas James Gale	Digital Farm Animals; Stacey	3:48
7.	"Do You Ever Think of Me"	Alexander Ryberg; Cassandra Stroberg; Niklas Carson Mattsson	Per Magnusson; David Kreuger; Mattsson	3:25
8.	"My Hero"	Ed Sheeran; Wayne Hector; Steve Mac	Mac	3:16
9.	"End of Time"	Philip Magee; Stephen Garrigan; Cian MacSweeny	Saints + Sinners	3:16
10.	"Magic"	Feehily; Filan; Tom Williams; Alexander Charles; Scott	Scott	3:20
11.	"Always with Me"	Feehily; Filan; Philip Magee; Stephen Garrigan; Cian MacSweeny	Saints + Sinners	3:04
Total length:				36:59

Digital and deluxe edition bonus tracks
No.	Title	Length
12.	"World of Our Own" (live at Ulster Hall)	4:10
13.	"Uptown Girl" (live at Ulster Hall)	3:12
14.	"Flying Without Wings" (live at Ulster Hall)	4:24
15.	"You Raise Me Up" (live at Ulster Hall)	6:50
Total length:		55:38

== Personnel ==
- Matt Holyoak – photography (Luttrellstown Castle, Dublin)
- Salvador Design – design
- Mark Feehily – art design

== Charts ==
=== Weekly charts ===
Weekly chart performance for Wild Dreams
Chart (2021)	Peak position
Belgian Albums (Ultratop Flanders)	53
Dutch Albums (Album Top 100)	46
German Albums (Offizielle Top 100)	75
Hungarian Albums (MAHASZ)	35
Irish Albums (Official Charts)	2
Scottish Albums (Official Charts)	2
Swiss Albums (Schweizer Hitparade)	71
Taiwanese Albums (Five Music)	2
UK Albums (Official Charts)	2

=== Year-end charts ===
Year-end chart performance for Wild Dreams
Chart (2021)	Position
UK Albums (OCC)	90

== Certifications ==
Certifications for Wild Dreams
Region	Certification	Certified units/sales
United Kingdom (BPI)	Gold	100,000^{‡}
^{‡} Sales+streaming figures based on certification alone.

== See also ==
- List of UK top-ten albums in 2021
