= Anyone of Us (Stupid Mistake) =

2002 single by Gareth Gates

Single by Gareth Gates

from the album What My Heart Wants to Say
- B-side: "Forever Blue"
- Released: 8 July 2002
- Studio: A Side (Stockholm, Sweden)
- Length: 3:48
- Label: RCA, 19, S, BMG
- Songwriter(s): Jörgen Elofsson, Per Magnusson, David Kreuger
- Producer(s): Per Magnusson, David Kreuger

Gareth Gates singles chronology
"Unchained Melody" (2002)	"Anyone of Us (Stupid Mistake)" (2002)	"The Long and Winding Road" / "Suspicious Minds" (2002)

Music video
- "Anyone of Us (Stupid Mistake)" on YouTube

"Anyone of Us (Stupid Mistake)" is the second single from English pop singer Gareth Gates' debut studio album, What My Heart Wants to Say (2002). It was written by Jörgen Elofsson, Per Magnusson, and David Kreuger and produced by Magnusson and Kreuger. The single was released on 8 July 2002, entering the UK Singles Chart at No. 1 and staying there for three weeks, going platinum for sales exceeding 600,000 copies. It was then released in mainland Europe in 2003, reaching No. 1 on the Dutch, Norwegian, and Swedish charts. The video for the single was filmed in Venice, Italy.

== Track listings ==
- UK CD single
1. "Anyone of Us (Stupid Mistake)"
2. "Forever Blue"
3. "Anyone of Us (Stupid Mistake)" (video)
4. "Anyone of Us (Stupid Mistake)" (behind the scenes footage)
- UK cassette single and European CD single 1
1. "Anyone of Us (Stupid Mistake)" – 3:48
2. "Forever Blue" – 3:55
- European CD single 2
1. "Anyone of Us (Stupid Mistake)"
2. "What My Heart Wants to Say"
- European maxi-CD single 1
1. "Anyone of Us (Stupid Mistake)" – 3:48
2. "Forever Blue" – 3:55
3. "Unchained Melody" – 3:53
4. "Unchained Melody" (CD-ROM video)
- European maxi-CD single 2
1. "Anyone of Us (Stupid Mistake)" – 3:48
2. "What My Heart Wants to Say" (single remix) – 4:12
3. "Unchained Melody" – 3:53
4. "Unchained Melody" (CD-ROM video)

== Credits and personnel ==
Credits are lifted from the What My Heart Wants to Say album booklet.

Studios

- Recorded at A Side Studios (Stockholm, Sweden)
- Strings recorded at Soundtrade Studios (Solna, Sweden)
- Mixed at Mono Studios (Stockholm, Sweden)
- Mastered at The Calling Room (Stockholm, Sweden)

Personnel

- Jörgen Elofsson – writing
- Per Magnusson – writing, keyboards, production, arrangement
- David Kreuger – writing, programming, production, arrangement
- Anders von Hofsten – backing vocals
- Jeanette Olsson – backing vocals
- Esbjörn Öhrwall – guitar
- Tomas Lindberg – bass
- Gustave Lund – percussion
- Stockholm Session Strings – strings
- Ulf Janson – string arrangement, conducting
- Henrik Janson – string arrangement, conducting
- Magnus Andersson – recordings (strings)
- Bernard Löhr – mixing
- Björn Engelmann – mastering

== Charts ==
=== Weekly charts ===
Chart (2002–2003)	Peak position
Austria (Ö3 Austria Top 40)	6
Belgium (Ultratop 50 Flanders)	3
Belgium (Ultratip Bubbling Under Wallonia)	9
Czech Republic (IFPI)	11
Europe (Eurochart Hot 100)	6
Germany (GfK)	3
Hungary (Rádiós Top 40)	3
Ireland (IRMA)	2
Netherlands (Dutch Top 40)	1
Netherlands (Single Top 100)	1
Norway (VG-lista)	1
Romania (Romanian Top 100)	12
Scotland (OCC)	1
Sweden (Sverigetopplistan)	1
Switzerland (Schweizer Hitparade)	24
UK Singles (OCC)	1

=== Year-end charts ===
Chart (2002)	Position
Ireland (IRMA)	22
UK Singles (OCC)	6

Chart (2003)	Position
Austria (Ö3 Austria Top 40)	33
Belgium (Ultratop 50 Flanders)	13
Germany (Media Control GfK)	25
Netherlands (Dutch Top 40)	17
Netherlands (Single Top 100)	7
Romania (Romanian Top 100)	46
Sweden (Hitlistan)	21

=== Decade-end charts ===
Chart (2000–2009)	Position
Netherlands (Single Top 100)	50
UK Singles (OCC)	61

== Certifications ==
Region	Certification	Certified units/sales
Germany (BVMI)	Gold	150,000^{^}
Norway (IFPI Norway)	Platinum	10,000^{*}
United Kingdom (BPI)	Platinum	581,000
^{*} Sales figures based on certification alone.^{^} Shipments figures based on certification alone.
