= Safe (Westlife song) =

Single by Westlife

from the album Gravity
- B-side: "Please Stay"
- Released: November 14, 2010
- Recorded: August 2010; Henson Recording Studios (Hollywood, California); RAK Studios (London, England)
- Genre: Pop rock
- Length: 3:52
- Label: Syco; Sony; RCA
- Songwriters: John Shanks; James Grundler
- Producers: John Shanks; Richard "Biff" Stannard; Ash Howes

Westlife singles chronology
| "Everybody Hurts" (2009) | "Safe" (2010) | "Lighthouse" (2011) |

Music video
- "Safe" on YouTube

"Safe" is a song by Irish pop group Westlife from their tenth studio album Gravity (2010) and this pop rock ballad was released on 14 November 2010 as the album's lead and only single in the United Kingdom. It was written by John Shanks and James Grundler, and the single version was produced by Shanks, Richard "Biff" Stannard, and Ash Howes. This song is the group's last physical single under the tutelage of Simon Cowell, having left Syco and Cowell in March 2011. "Safe" debuted at number four in Ireland. It charted at number ten in the UK, becoming their twenty-fourth and last top ten single, meaning that they had one top ten hit in three different decades. The song was featured in the 2011 movie Dolphin Tale starring Harry Connick Jr., Ashley Judd, Kris Kristofferson and Morgan Freeman.

== Background ==
The decision to release 'Safe' as the first and only single from the group's new album came from executive producer Simon Cowell. The track was written by album producer John Shanks and James Grundler, frontman of American rock group Golden State.

The single was first performed live on BBC Radio 2 Weekend Wogan Show.

It was composed in the traditional verse–chorus form in D major, with Filan and Feehily's vocal ranging from the chords of D_{4} to A_{5}.

=== Release ===
The single's b-side, a cover version of "Please Stay", was recorded in 2009, and was promised to be included on the next single released following "What About Now". It is their first original lead song and single released off a new album since their 2002 single "Unbreakable".

=== Soundtrack ===
The song was featured in the end credits of the 2011 American film Dolphin Tale. On 11 October 2011, the soundtrack album was released.

== Critical reception ==
The single received general positive reviews from fans and critics.

== Promotion ==
=== Premiere week ===
A 30-second snippet of the song was first heard on September 19, on the final audition show of ITV1 talent competition The X Factor. On September 26 and October 2, the song received a 60-second preview with different parts, becoming the theme for the Boys' Boot Camp results, once again on The X Factor. On October 3, a 40-second official snippet was posted on the band's website. Amazon.co.uk was the first to have the pre-order link of the single on October 4. On October 5, the full version was released on their official YouTube site. On October 6, the official lyrics were released.

They sent the single to UK and Irish radio stations on 4 October. The single debuted on B-List of BBC Radio 2 on the week commencing 2010 October 16. They had a radio tour confirmed first on Real Radio Scotland, Northwest. On 22 October 2010, they announced their UK regional radio tour with schedule of complete date, time, and venue. HR3 radio station first confirmed the airplay of the single on Germany on 16 October 2010. They performed this single in The Dome 56, Germany on 26 November 2010 and broadcast on RTL II Germany on 4, 18 December 2010 but was later cancelled. Afterwards, they are opt to promote on international market as they had meetings about it. They had interviews with RTHK Radio 2 in Hong Kong, Kawanku Magazine and Tabloid Nova in Indonesia, Daily Joong-ang in South Korea, and Sayidaty in Middle East on 5 November 2010. At the same day, Nicky tweeted he will do a lot of phone call interviews on other countries not mentioned above such as Thailand, Philippines, Taiwan, Sweden, Switzerland, and South Africa. After the radio tour comes the promo tour in television shows. One of it was their performance live on X Factor on 14 November 2010 that coincides the promotion of Gravity and the face-off with other boybands, Take That and JLS. (See Schedule)

=== Tours performed at ===
- Gravity Tour (2011)
- Greatest Hits Tour (2012)
- The Wild Dreams Tour (2022) (At Hop Farm and Colchester shows - later dropped from setlist, replaced with a medley of What Makes a Man, Unbreakable, Queen of My Heart and I'm Already There)
- The With Love Tour (2024)

== Track listing ==
1. "Safe" (Single Mix) – 3:52
2. "Please Stay" – 3:45

== Credits and personnel ==
- John Shanks – songwriter, producer, guitar, bass
- James Grundler – songwriter
- Richard "Biff" Stannard – additional production and mixing
- Ash Howes – additional production and mixing
- Lars Fox – Pro Tools editing
- Helen Atkinson – assistant engineer
- Nicolas Essig – assistant engineer
- Jeff Rothschild – recording and drums
- Charles Judge – keyboards
- Jamie Muhoberac – keyboards
- John Shanks – keyboards
- Seton Daunt – additional guitar
- Wil Malone – strings arrangement
- Richard Woodcraft – strings recording
- Shari Sutcliffe – musician contractor and production coordination

== Charts ==
| Chart (2010) | Peak position |
|---|---|
| Euro Digital Tracks (Billboard) | 18 |
| Ireland (IRMA) | 4 |
| Ireland Digital Tracks (Billboard) | 5 |
| Ireland Download (GfK Chart-Track) | 6 |
| Scottish Singles Sales (Official Charts) | 7 |
| South Korea (Gaon International Digital Chart) | 20 |
| South Korea (Gaon International Download Chart) | 12 |
| South Korea (Gaon International Streaming Chart) | 29 |
| UK Singles (Official Charts) | 10 |
| UK Airplay (Music Week) | 37 |
| UK Physical Singles (OCC) | 2 |

=== Year-end charts ===
| Chart (2010) | Position |
|---|---|
| Taiwan (Hito Radio) | 96 |
