= Westlife (album) =

Studio album by Westlife
- Released: 1 November 1999
- Studios: Rokstone (London, England); Cheiron (Stockholm, Sweden); CaVa (Glasgow, Scotland)
- Genre: Pop
- Length: 65:37 (standard edition); 51:00 (North American edition)
- Labels: RCA; BMG
- Producers: Cutfather & Joe; David Foster; David Frank; Clive Gardiner; Jaime Ikeda; Steve Kipner; David Kreuger; Steve Mac; Per Magnusson; Rovi; Jake Schulze; TTW; Pete Waterman; Rami Yacoub

Westlife chronology
| Westlife (1999) | Coast to Coast (2000) |

Westlife
- North American edition art cover

Singles from Westlife
- 1. "Swear It Again" Released: 19 April 1999; 2. "If I Let You Go" Released: 9 August 1999; 3. "Flying Without Wings" Released: 18 October 1999; 4. "I Have a Dream" / "Seasons in the Sun" Released: 13 December 1999; 5. "Fool Again" Released: 27 March 2000

Westlife is the debut studio album by Irish boy band Westlife. It was released on 1 November 1999 through RCA Records.

The album received generally mixed reviews, with praise for its strong production and well-performed, radio-friendly ballads, but criticism for its uniformity and overly sentimental style typical of boy bands. Despite divided critical opinion, it achieved major commercial success, producing five UK number-one hit singles "Swear It Again", "If I Let You Go", "Flying Without Wings", the double A-side "I Have a Dream"/"Seasons in the Sun", and "Fool Again," and reaching top chart positions internationally, along with multi-platinum certifications in several countries.

The album is officially the thirty-sixth most streamed album from the 90s decade, based on UK streams, as compiled exclusively by the Official Charts Company for "National Album Day" as of October 2023.

== Background ==
Westlife emerged from a Sligo-based pop group formed by schoolmates Kian Egan, Mark Feehily, and Shane Filan, who initially performed together in school and local theatre productions before forming a vocal group in 1997. After several early name changes and an initial single release, the group came to the attention of manager Louis Walsh, who restructured the line-up in 1998 by adding Nicky Byrne and Brian McFadden. Renamed Westlife, the group signed a four-million-pound major record deal with RCA Records in November 1998 and immediately flew to Stockholm to commence recording their debut album. They gained early exposure supporting Boyzone and the Backstreet Boys, and made their first national television appearance later that year.

== Release ==
Their lead single "Swear It Again" was released in April 1999. Two further singles followed and the album was released in November 1999. The album's standard edition features 17 tracks, while the band said they had recorded 22 songs for their debut album. For North America, Westlife signed to Arista Records after auditioning for the label's founder, Clive Davis. Westlife released "Swear It Again" as their debut there on 7 March 2000. The album was released on 4 April 2000 with an altered track listing that included the new song, "My Private Movie".

A documentary video album related to the release, entitled "The Westlife Story", was released in October 2000, peaking at number 15 on the UK Visual Chart. The release, available in VHS and DVD, tells the story of how the five members became Westlife, the recording of their first album, and includes their then 4 music videos. On 26 June 2000, the DVD was re-released, containing all their then 6 music videos, and on 18 November 2002, it was included in the five disc box set entitled Westlife: The Complete Story.

== Critical reception ==
Professional ratings
Review scores
| Source | Rating |
|---|---|
| AllMusic | 3/5 stars |
| Entertainment Weekly | C |
| The Tribune | 5/5 stars |

Indian English-language newspaper The Tribune wrote: "Mainly comprising soulful ballads and mid-tempo filers, this is a delightful album [...] The tracks worth listening to include the hit single "If I Let You Go", "Flying Without Wings", "Change the World", "What I Want Is What I’ve Got", "We Are One", "Can't Lose What You Never Had" and the current chart topper "Fool Again". A lot of potential there."

AllMusic editor Jaime Sunao Ikeda found that the album was "well-sung, but all too similar in its final output. Mostly comprised of ballads whose theme is the obvious sort, the hooks are infectious and several tracks are destined for recurrent radio status in the not-too-distant future [...] Every song is well-produced and well-placed in the set; as mentioned, each track is perfectly executed. This assemblage is a worthy complement to the listening pleasures of anyone enjoying the likes of today's most popular boybands."

Elisabeth Vincentelli from Entertainment Weekly felt that Westlife "should come with a warning to diabetics." She added: "Westlife have staked a claim on the boy-band map: syrupy ballads and nothing else. Slaves to girls' desires, they spend their entire self-titled debut CD hoping, moping, moaning, and begging for another chance, girl. Even the cover of Extreme's "More Than Words" sounds like it was lifted from Andrew Lloyd Webber."

== Commercial performance ==
All five singles from the album peaked at number one on the UK Singles Chart in less than a year. Despite this, however, the album itself entered and peaked at number two, beaten by Steptacular by Steps. The album was the biggest chart dropper on the top 40 in UK music history when, in its 58th week on the charts it leapt from No. 79 to No. 3 before falling to No. 37 the following week. In Scotland, the album peaked at No. 1 years after its release in 2001 after originally peaking at No. 6 on the Scottish Charts in 1999. The album also peaked at number 1 in Ireland and 15 in Australia.

The album became the eighth best-selling album of 1999 in the United Kingdom and was certified 5× Platinum. The album spent seventy-four weeks in the UK Top 100. Westlife is the best-selling international album ever in Indonesia and the Philippines, receiving 20× platinum certifications for over 1 million copies sold in Indonesia and 25× Platinum certifications for over 500,000 units sold in the Philippines. In 2000, the album was released in the United States and debuted at number 2 on the Billboard Top Heatseekers and peaked at 129 on the Billboard 200.

== Track listing ==
Westlife – Standard edition
| No. | Title | Writer(s) | Producer(s) | Length |
|---|---|---|---|---|
| 1. | "Swear It Again" | Steve Mac; Wayne Hector | Mac | 4:08 |
| 2. | "If I Let You Go" | David Kreuger; Jörgen Elofsson; Per Magnusson | Kreuger; Magnusson | 3:41 |
| 3. | "Flying Without Wings" | Mac; Hector | Mac | 3:36 |
| 4. | "Fool Again" | Kreuger; Elofsson; Magnusson | Kreuger; Magnusson | 3:54 |
| 5. | "No No" | Andreas Carlsson; Rami | Rami | 3:14 |
| 6. | "I Don't Wanna Fight" | Mac; Hector; Peter Cetera; David Foster | Mac | 5:03 |
| 7. | "Change the World" | Lance Ellington; Topham; Twigg | TTW | 3:09 |
| 8. | "Moments" | Mac; Hector | Mac | 4:17 |
| 9. | "Seasons in the Sun" | Jacques Brel; Rod McKuen | TTW | 4:08 |
| 10. | "I Need You" | Andreas Carlsson; Max Martin; Rami | Rami | 3:49 |
| 11. | "Miss You" | Jake Schulze; Rami | Schulze; Rami | 3:53 |
| 12. | "More Than Words" | Gary Cherone; Nuno Bettencourt | Mac | 3:54 |
| 13. | "Open Your Heart" | Carlsson; Schulze | Schulze | 3:38 |
| 14. | "Try Again" | Kreuger; Elofsson; Magnusson | Kreuger; Magnusson | 3:34 |
| 15. | "What I Want Is What I've Got" | Alexandra Talomaa; Rami | Rami | 3:33 |
| 16. | "We Are One" | Alexandre Desplat; Mac; Hector | Mac | 3:42 |
| 17. | "Can't Lose What You Never Had" | David Frank; Steve Kipner | Frank; Kipner | 4:23 |
| Total length: | | | | 65:37 |

Westlife – Streaming Version
| No. | Title | Writer(s) | Producer(s) | Length |
|---|---|---|---|---|
| 18. | "My Private Movie" | Kipner; David Kopatz; Jack Kugell | Cutfather & Joe | 4:04 |
| Total length: | | | | 69:49 |

Westlife – Japanese edition bonus track
| No. | Title | Writer(s) | Producer(s) | Length |
|---|---|---|---|---|
| 18. | "Story of Love" | Patrick Tucker; Shepard Solomon; Arnthor Birgisson | Jaime Ikeda; Rovi | 3:54 |
| Total length: | | | | 69:31 |

Westlife – Australian edition bonus track
| No. | Title | Writer(s) | Producer(s) | Length |
|---|---|---|---|---|
| 19. | "I Have a Dream" | Benny Andersson; Björn Ulvaeus | Pete Waterman | 4:07 |
| Total length: | | | | 73:38 |

Westlife – North American edition
| No. | Title | Writer(s) | Producer(s) | Length |
|---|---|---|---|---|
| 1. | "Swear It Again" | Mac; Hector | Mac | 4:08 |
| 2. | "Can't Lose What You Never Had" | Frank; Kipner | Frank; Kipner | 4:24 |
| 3. | "I Don't Wanna Fight" | Mac; Hector; Cetera; Foster | Mac | 5:03 |
| 4. | "My Private Movie" | Kipner; David Kopatz; Jack Kugell | Cutfather & Joe | 4:04 |
| 5. | "Flying Without Wings" | Mac; Hector | Mac | 3:36 |
| 6. | "If I Let You Go" | Kreuger; Elofsson; Magnusson | Kreuger; Magnusson | 3:41 |
| 7. | "Fool Again" | Kreuger; Elofsson; Magnusson | Kreuger; Magnusson | 3:54 |
| 8. | "No No" | Carlsson; Rami | Rami | 3:14 |
| 9. | "Miss You" | Schulze; Rami | Schulze; Rami | 3:53 |
| 10. | "Open Your Heart" | Carlsson; Schulze | Schulze | 3:38 |
| 11. | "We Are One" | Desplat; Mac; Hector | Mac | 3:42 |
| 12. | "I Need You" | Carlsson; Martin; Rami | Rami | 3:49 |
| 13. | "More Than Words" | Cherone; Bettencourt | Mac | 3:54 |
| Total length: | | | | 51:00 |

The Westlife Story
| No. | Title | Length |
|---|---|---|
| 1. | "The Westlife Story" (Documentary) |
| 2. | "Swear It Again" (Video) |
| 3. | "If I Let You Go" (Video) |
| 4. | "Flying Without Wings" (Video) |
| 5. | "I Have a Dream" (Video) |
| 6. | "Seasons in the Sun" (Video) |
| 7. | "Fool Again" (Video) |
| 8. | "Photo Gallery" |
| 9. | "Hidden Track" |
| 10. | "Trivia Quiz" |
| 11. | "Interactive Scene & Song Selection" |
| 12. | "Weblink" |
| 13. | "Previously Unseen Footage" |

== Personnel ==
- Acoustic guitar, electric guitar:
  Mats Berntoft (tracks: 2, 4, 14)
- Arrangement (strings):
  Henrik Janson (tracks: 2, 4, 11, 13, 14)
  Richard Niles (tracks: 1, 3, 6, 8, 12, 16)
  Ulf Janson (tracks: 2, 4, 11, 13, 14)
- Arrangement (vocals):
  Steve Mac (tracks: 1, 3, 6, 8, 12, 16)
  Wayne Hector (tracks: 1, 3, 6, 8, 12, 16)
- Artwork (design):
  root
- Backing vocals (additional):
  Anders Von Hofsten (tracks: 2, 11, 13 to 15)
  Andreas Carlsson (tracks: 2, 5, 13)
- Bass guitar:
  Steve Pearce (tracks: 3, 6, 12, 16)
  Thomas Lindberg (tracks: 2, 13, 15)

- Engineering assistance:
  Daniel Pursey (tracks: 1, 3, 6, 8, 12, 16)
- Engineer for mix:
  Matt Howe (tracks: 1, 3, 6, 8, 12, 16)
- Engineer and programming:
  Chris Laws (tracks: 1, 3, 6, 8, 12, 16)
- Executive producer:
  Simon Cowell
  Steve Mac
  Wayne Hector
- Guitar:
  Esbjörn Öhrwall (tracks: 11, 13, 15)
  Paul Gendler (tracks: 1, 3, 6, 8, 12, 16)
- Keyboards:
  Per Magnusson (tracks: 2, 4, 14)
- Photography:
  Brian Aris

== Charts ==
=== Weekly charts ===
Weekly chart performance for Westlife
| Chart (1999–2000) | Peak position |
|---|---|
| Australian Albums (ARIA) | 15 |
| Belgian Albums (Ultratop Flanders) | 5 |
| Danish Albums (Hitlisten) | 12 |
| Dutch Albums (Album Top 100) | 8 |
| European Albums Chart (Billboard) | 10 |
| Finnish Albums (Suomen virallinen lista) | 40 |
| German Albums (Offizielle Top 100) | 55 |
| Icelandic Albums (Tónlist) | 16 |
| Irish Albums (IRMA) | 1 |
| Malaysian Albums (IFPI) | 1 |
| New Zealand Albums (RMNZ) | 5 |
| Norwegian Albums (VG-lista) | 1 |
| Scottish Albums (OCC) | 1 |
| Singapore Albums (SPVA) | 1 |
| Spanish Albums (PROMUSICAE) | 48 |
| Swedish Albums (Sverigetopplistan) | 5 |
| Swiss Albums (Schweizer Hitparade) | 25 |
| UK Albums (Official Charts) | 2 |
| US Billboard 200 | 129 |

=== Year-end charts ===
1999 year-end chart performance for Westlife
| Chart (1999) | Position |
|---|---|
| Belgian Albums (Ultratop Flanders) | 46 |
| Danish Albums (Hitlisten) | 78 |
| Dutch Albums (Album Top 100) | 98 |
| European Albums (Eurochart Hot 100) | 96 |
| Swedish Albums (Sverigetopplistan) | 61 |
| UK Albums (OCC) | 9 |

2000 year-end chart performance for Westlife
| Chart (2000) | Position |
|---|---|
| Belgian Albums (Ultratop Flanders) | 65 |
| Dutch Albums (Album Top 100) | 100 |
| European Albums (Eurochart Hot 100) | 40 |
| New Zealand Albums (RMNZ) | 14 |
| Singaporean English Albums (SPVA) | 1 |
| Swedish Albums (Sverigetopplistan) | 91 |
| UK Albums (OCC) | 32 |

2001 year-end chart performance for Westlife
| Chart (2001) | Position |
|---|---|
| UK Albums (OCC) | 117 |

== Certifications and sales ==
Certifications and sales for Westlife
| Region | Certification | Certified units/sales |
|---|---|---|
| Australia (ARIA) | Gold | 35,000^{^} |
| Denmark (IFPI Danmark) | 2× Platinum | 40,000^{‡} |
| Indonesia (ASIRI) | 20× Platinum | 1,000,000 |
| Mexico (AMPROFON) | Gold | 75,000^{^} |
| Netherlands (NVPI) | Gold | 50,000^{^} |
| New Zealand (RMNZ) | 3× Platinum | 45,000^{^} |
| Norway | — | 95,000 |
| Philippines | — | 500,000 |
| Singapore | — | 93,000 |
| Sweden (GLF) | Platinum | 80,000^{^} |
| United Kingdom (BPI) | 5× Platinum | 1,500,000^{*} |
Summaries
| Europe (IFPI) | 2× Platinum | 2,000,000^{*} |
| Southeast Asia | — | 1,500,000 |
| Worldwide | — | 6,000,000 |
^{*} Sales figures based on certification alone.^{^} Shipments figures based on certification alone.^{‡} Sales+streaming figures based on certification alone.

== Release history ==
Westlife release history
| Country | Date | Formats |
|---|---|---|
| United Kingdom | 1 November 1999 | Standard (17 tracks) |
| Japan | 4 April 2000 | Standard (18 tracks) |
| Philippines | 18 April 2000 | Deluxe (2×CD) |
| United States | 7 May 2000 | Standard (13 tracks) |
| Australia | 15 May 2000 | Standard (18 tracks) |
| Philippines | 31 July 2000 | Platinum (2×CD, CD+DVD) |
| United Kingdom | 15 October 2000 | Video (The Westlife Story) |
| Japan | 19 December 2000 | Standard (No.1 Hits & Rare Tracks) |

== See also ==
- List of best-selling albums in Indonesia
- List of best-selling albums in the Philippines
