= A Side Productions =

Swedish music production company

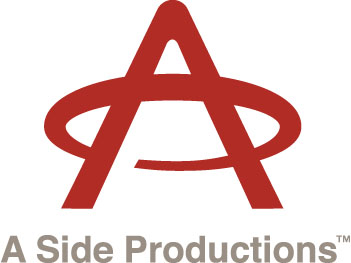
- Company type: Corporation
- Industry: Music
- Founded: 2001
- Founders: Per Magnusson; David Kreuger
- Headquarters: Stockholm, Sweden
- Key people: Per Magnusson; Songwriter/Producer; David Kreuger; Songwriter/Producer
- Services: Music Production; Music Composition
- Website: asideproductions.com

A Side Productions is a music production company established by Per Magnusson and David Kreuger in early 2001. Located in the center of Stockholm, A Side Productions writes and produces songs for artists such as Il Divo, Leona Lewis, Shayne Ward and Paul Potts to mention a few.

Together Magnusson and Kreuger started off a musical career in 1994 when invited by Denniz PoP to join his recently founded Cheiron Productions. The following years the tandem gained huge international recognition working with Boyzone, Britney Spears, Westlife and the Backstreet Boys.

Shortly after Cheiron was dissolved, Magnusson and Kreuger formed A Side Productions and success has kept coming. This includes co-writing and / or producing three UK No 1 singles to date:

- Evergreen (Will Young)
- Anyone of Us (Stupid Mistake) (Gareth Gates)
- That's My Goal (Shayne Ward)

Involved in the immense global success of Il Divo, A Side Productions since 2004 has contributed with more than a dozen productions and songs across their four studio albums. The latest production for the quartet is L'Alba Del Mondo included on The Promise, which was released in the UK on November 10, 2008, instantly reaching No 1.

A week later, previous X Factor winner Leona Lewis bounced back to the top of the charts with Spirit The Deluxe Edition including her third single, the A Side Productions' co-written song Footprints in the Sand, which earlier in 2008 reached No 2.
