= Mitsubishi Electric Halle =

Indoor arena in Düsseldorf, Germany

Coordinates: 51°12′23″N 6°48′31″E

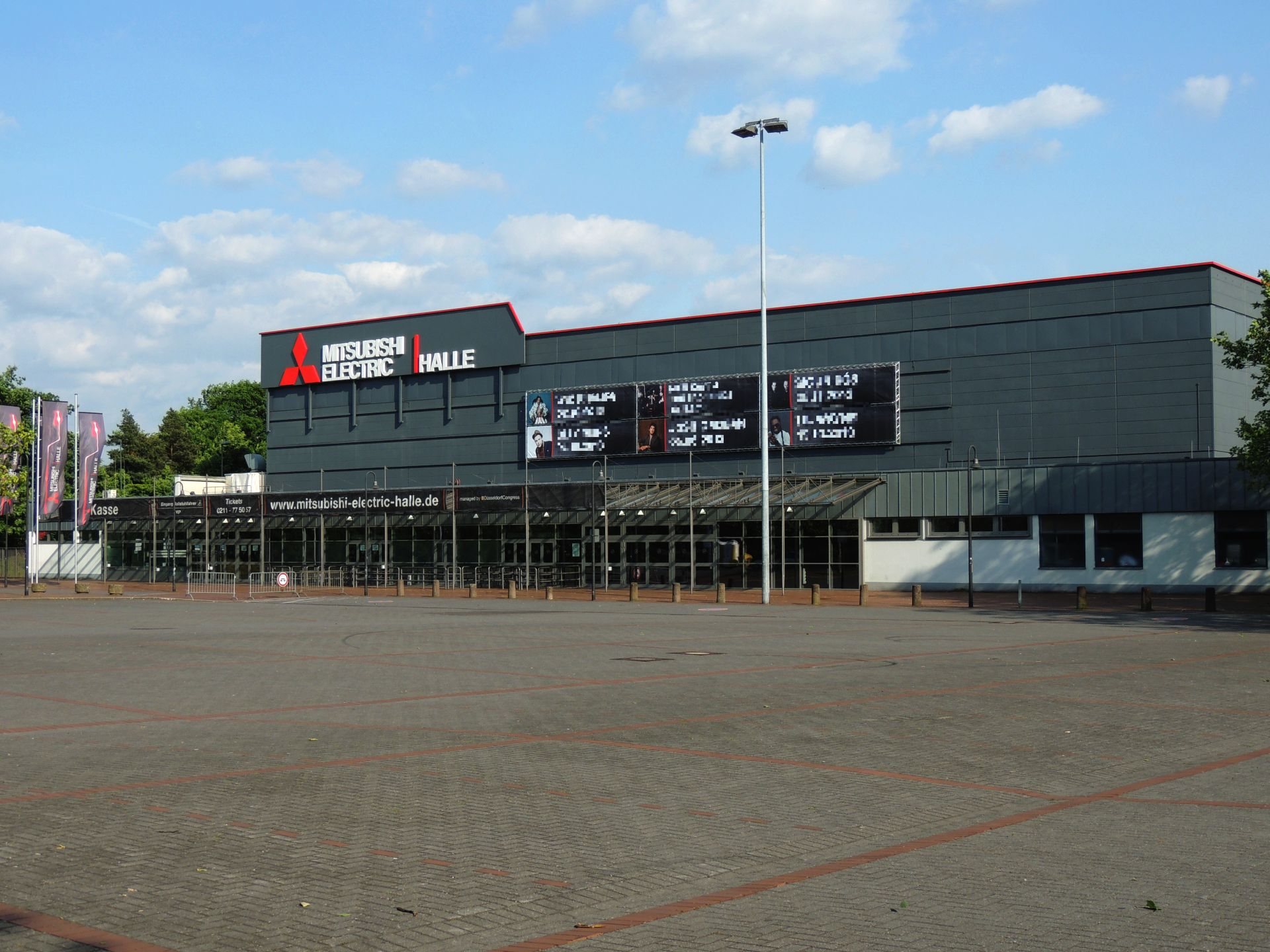
- Interactive map of Mitsubishi Electric Halle
- Former names: Philips Halle (1971-2011)
- Address: Siegburger Str. 15; 40591 Düsseldorf, Nordrhein-Westfalen, Germany
- Location: Oberbilk
- Owner: Stadt und Düsseldorf
- Operator: Düsseldorf Congress Sport & Event
- Capacity: 7,500

Construction
- Opened: 1971

Tenant
- RheinEnergie Köln (Euroleague) (2006-07)

Website
- Venue Website (German)

Mitsubishi Electric Halle (formerly branded Philips Halle) is an indoor arena located in Düsseldorf, Germany. It opened in 1971 and has a capacity of 7,500 people.

== History ==
It was originally named after Dutch electronics conglomerate Philips. It was home of the RheinEnergie Köln, for Euroleague games, for the 2006/2007 season. It was renamed the Mitsubishi Electric Halle in April 2011.

== Concerts ==
- In their early days, U2 played there on the 10 October 1984 as part of The Unforgettable Fire Tour.
- On 7 May 2001, Irish vocal pop band Westlife held a concert for their Where Dreams Come True Tour supporting their album Coast to Coast.
- On June 29, 2007, French electronic duo Daft Punk performed their first time in Germany with the Alive 2006/2007 tour.
- On 15 June 2019, British pop band Take That played a date as part of their European Greatest Hits Live tour.
- On 16 March 2024, Japanese musician and vocalist Ado held a concert for her first world tour - "Wish".
- On April 8, 2024, Slash feat. Myles Kennedy & The Conspirators performed The River Is Rising – Rest of the World Tour '24 at the arena.

== Public transport ==
The nearest Train Station to the arena is Düsseldorf-Oberbilk, which is served by S-Bahn lines S1, S6 and during peak hours S68, Stadtbahn lines U76 and U79 as well as Tram line 701.
