= Coast to Coast (Westlife album) =

Studio album by Westlife
- Released: 6 November 2000
- Recorded: December 1999 – July 2000
- Studios: Rokstone (London, England); Cheiron (Stockholm, Sweden)
- Genre: Pop
- Length: 70:02
- Labels: BMG; RCA
- Producers: Simon Cowell (exec.); Mariah Carey; Daniel Frampton; David Kreuger; Steve Mac; Per Magnusson; Quiz & Larossi; Rami; Jake Schulze; Pete Waterman

Westlife chronology
Westlife (1999)	Coast to Coast (2000)	World of Our Own (2001)

Coast to Coast
- British edition art cover

Singles from Coast to Coast
- 1. "Against All Odds" Released: 15 September 2000; 2. "My Love" Released: 30 October 2000; 3. "What Makes a Man" Released: 18 December 2000; 4. "I Lay My Love on You" Released: 29 January 2001; 5. "When You're Looking Like That" Released: 30 July 2001

Coast to Coast is the second studio album by Irish boy band Westlife. It was released on 6 November 2000 by RCA Records. Five hit singles were released from the album: "Against All Odds", "My Love", "What Makes a Man", "I Lay My Love on You" and "When You're Looking Like That". The album was a commercial success in both Ireland and the United Kingdom, selling 1.8 million copies in Britain alone. The album was the third-best selling of 2000 in Britain. As of October 2001, it had sold seven million copies worldwide.

In January 2005, the album was re-issued in a two-in-one box set compilation with the group's third album, World of our Own (2001). A video album, titled Coast to Coast – Up Close and Personal, was released on 27 November 2000. It peaked at number one on the UK Visual Chart and a certified 3× platinum.

== Background ==
The band said that Coast to Coast was a step up from their first album, having more variety than Westlife. In a 2018 interview with the band, Shane Filan said that the album title, Coast to Coast, was taken from a line in their song "My Love" ('overseas from coast to coast'), and also because they're from the two coasts of Ireland. Filan also expressed remorse at "Close" not having been released as a single.

== Singles ==
"Against All Odds", a collaboration with Mariah Carey, was released on 15 September 2000, as the lead single from the album. Carey originally released her version of the song a few months earlier, as the third single from her seventh studio album, Rainbow (1999).

"My Love" was released on 31 October 2000 as the second single from Coast to Coast. It debuted at number one on the UK Singles Chart and become the band's seventh UK number one. "What Makes a Man" was released on 18 December 2000 as the third single off the album. It peaked at number two and was their first single not to peak at number one on the UK Singles Chart.

"I Lay My Love on You" was released as the fourth single in many parts of the world, including Australia, Asia and most notably Europe, excluding the UK and Ireland. "When You're Looking Like That" was released on 6 August 2001 as the fifth and final single from the album in Australia, New Zealand, Asia, Latin America, and Europe.

== Critical reception ==
Professional ratings
Review scores
Source	Rating
AllMusic	2.5/5 stars
MTV Asia	5/10
Yahoo! Music UK	5/10

Coast to Coast received negative reviews from music critics. Andrew Lynch from Entertainment.ie gave the album two out of five stars, calling it "just another cynical collection of formulaic pop". However, the album was reviewed more positively at AllMusic and Rovi, who both gave the album two and half stars, comparing Westlife to other boy bands such as Take That and Boyzone. Jenny North from Yahoo! Music UK wrote: "If Coast to Coast was chopped in half it could be a decent album."

== Commercial performance ==
Coast to Coast entered the UK Albums Chart at number one, with 234,767 copies sold in its first week, making it Westlife's fastest selling album to date. The album remained at number one for only one week, being replaced by the Beatles' compilation album 1. In April 2011, the album was certified six times platinum by the British Phonographic Industry for shipments of nearly two million copies in the United Kingdom. Up to November 2011, the album had sold 1,685,971 copies in the United Kingdom, becoming Westlife's biggest-selling studio album there. A gold sales award disc was issued to the band to commemorate sales in excess of 115,000 copies sold in Mexico. The album was also certified gold in Brazil by ABPD, for sales of over 100,000 copies. As of October 2001, it had sold seven million copies worldwide.

== Where Dreams Come True Tour ==
The Where Dreams Come True Tour was the second concert tour by Westlife in support of their second studio album, Coast to Coast. It was seen by 600,000 fans and was nicknamed "The No Stools Tour" due to the band's reputation of performing while perched on stools.

== Track listing ==
Coast to Coast – Standard edition
No.	Title	Writer(s)	Producer(s)	Length
1.	"My Love"	Jörgen Elofsson, Pelle Nylén, David Kreuger, Per Magnusson	Magnusson, Kreuger	3:53
2.	"What Makes a Man"	Steve Mac, Wayne Hector	Mac	3:52
3.	"I Lay My Love on You"	Elofsson, Magnusson, Kreuger	Magnusson, Kreuger	3:31
4.	"Against All Odds (Take a Look at Me Now)"	Phil Collins	Mariah Carey, Mac	3:22
5.	"When You're Looking Like That"	Rami, Andreas Carlsson, Max Martin	Rami	3:54
6.	"Close"	Mac, Hector, Chris Farren, Glen Ballard	Mac	4:05
7.	"Somebody Needs You"	Elofsson, Carlsson, Jake Schulze	Jake	3:09
8.	"Angel's Wings"	Mac, Hector, Jimmy MacCarthy	Mac	4:05
9.	"Soledad"	Rami, Carlsson, K. C. Porter	Magnusson, Kreuger	3:59
10.	"Puzzle of My Heart"	Elofsson, Andrew Fromm	Magnusson, Kreuger	3:40
11.	"Dreams Come True"	Elofsson, Magnusson, Kreuger	Magnusson, Kreuger	3:09
12.	"No Place That Far"	Sara Evans, Tom Shapiro, Tony Martin	Mac	3:15
13.	"You Make Me Feel"	Nick Jarl, Patric Jonsson, Max Martin	Mac	3:38
14.	"Loneliness Knows Me by Name"	Alexandra Talomaa	Jake, Andreas "Quiz" Romdhane, Josef Larossi	3:04
15.	"Fragile Heart"	Mac, McFadden, Egan, Filan, MacCarthy	Mac	3:01
16.	"Every Little Thing You Do"	Mac, Hector, Ballard, Siedah Garrett	Mac	4:06

Coast to Coast – Australian edition bonus track
No.	Title	Writer(s)	Producer(s)	Length
17.	"Nothing Is Impossible"	Ray Hedges, Martin Brannigan, Nicky Byrne, Kian Egan, Brian McFadden	Hedges, Brannigan	3:15

Coast to Coast – European reissue bonus tracks/Streaming Expanded Edition
No.	Title	Writer(s)	Producer(s)	Length
5.	"When You're Looking Like That" (Single Remix)	Rami, Andreas Carlsson, Max Martin	Rami	3:54
17.	"Uptown Girl" (Radio Edit)	Billy Joel	Mac	3:08
18.	"I Have a Dream" (Remix)	Benny Andersson, Bjorn Ulvaeus	Mac	4:16
19.	"My Girl"	William 'Smokey' Robinson, Ronald White	Mac	2:54

Coast to Coast – Special Limited Edition
No.	Title	Writer(s)	Producer(s)	Length
1.	"My Love"	Jörgen Elofsson, Pelle Nylén, David Kreuger, Per Magnusson	Magnusson, Kreuger	3:53
2.	"What Makes a Man"	Steve Mac, Wayne Hector	Mac	3:52
3.	"I Lay My Love on You"	Elofsson, Magnusson, Kreuger	Magnusson, Kreuger	3:31
4.	"Against All Odds (Take a Look at Me Now)"	Phil Collins	Mariah Carey, Mac	3:22
5.	"When You're Looking Like That"	Rami, Andreas Carlsson, Max Martin	Rami	3:54
6.	"Close"	Mac, Hector, Chris Farren, Glen Ballard	Mac	4:05
7.	"Somebody Needs You"	Elofsson, Carlsson, Jake Schulze	Jake	3:09
8.	"Angel's Wings"	Mac, Hector, Jimmy MacCarthy	Mac	4:05
9.	"Soledad"	Rami, Carlsson, K. C. Porter	Magnusson, Kreuger	3:59
10.	"Puzzle of My Heart"	Elofsson, Andrew Fromm	Magnusson, Kreuger	3:40
11.	"Dreams Come True"	Elofsson, Magnusson, Kreuger	Magnusson, Kreuger	3:09
12.	"No Place That Far"	Sara Evans, Tom Shapiro, Tony Martin	Mac	3:15
13.	"Close Your Eyes"	Mac, Hector, Dean Pitchford, Tom Snow	Mac	4:34
14.	"You Make Me Feel"	Nick Jarl, Patric Jonsson, Max Martin	Mac	3:38
15.	"Loneliness Knows Me by Name"	Alexandra Talomaa	Jake, Andreas "Quiz" Romdhane, Josef Larossi	3:04
16.	"Fragile Heart"	Mac, McFadden, Egan, Filan, MacCarthy	Mac	3:01
17.	"Every Little Thing You Do"	Mac, Hector, Ballard, Siedah Garrett	Mac	4:06
18.	"Nothing Is Impossible"	Ray Hedges, Martin Brannigan, Nicky Byrne, Kian Egan, Brian McFadden	Hedges, Brannigan	3:15
Total length:				65:41

Coast to Coast – Spanish and Latin American reissue bonus tracks
No.	Title	Writer(s)	Producer(s)	Length
20.	"En Ti Deje Mi Amor" ("I Lay My Love on You" – Single re-mix)	Elofsson, Magnusson, Kreuger	Magnusson, Krueger	3:31
21.	"Con Lo Bien que Te Ves" (When You're Looking Like That – Single re-mix)	Rami, Carlsson, Max Martin	Rami	3:54

Coast to Coast – UK exclusive edition
No.	Title	Writer(s)	Producer(s)	Length
1.	"My Love"	Jörgen Elofsson, David Kreuger, Per Magnusson, Pelle Nylén	Magnusson, Kreuger	3:53
2.	"What Makes a Man"	Steve Mac, Wayne Hector	Mac	3:51
3.	"I Lay My Love on You"	Elofsson, Magnusson, Kreuger	Magnusson, Kreuger	3:31
4.	"I Have a Dream" (Remix)	Benny Andersson, Björn Ulvaeus	Dan Frampton, Pete Waterman	4:16
5.	"Against All Odds" (with Mariah Carey)	Phil Collins	Carey, Mac	3:22
6.	"When You're Looking Like That"	Rami, Andreas Carlsson, Max Martin	Rami	3:54
7.	"Close"	Mac, Hector, Chris Farren, Glen Ballard	Mac	4:05
8.	"Somebody Needs You"	Elofsson, Carlsson, Jake Schulze	Jake	3:09
9.	"Angel's Wings"	Mac, Hector, Jimmy MacCarthy	Mac	4:05
10.	"Soledad"	Rami, Carlsson, K. C. Porter	Magnusson, Kreuger	3:58
11.	"Puzzle of My Heart"	Elofsson, Andrew Fromm	Magnusson, Kreuger	3:40
12.	"Dreams Come True"	Elofsson, Magnusson, Kreuger	Magnusson, Kreuger	3:09
13.	"No Place That Far"	Sara Evans, Tom Shapiro, Tony Martin	Mac	3:14
14.	"Close Your Eyes"	Mac, Hector, Dean Pitchford, Tom Snow	Mac	4:34
15.	"You Make Me Feel"	Nick Jarl, Patric Jonsson, Max Martin	Mac	3:38
16.	"Loneliness Knows Me by Name"	Alexandra Talomaa	Jake, Andreas "Quiz" Romdhane, Josef Larossi	3:04
17.	"Fragile Heart"	Mac, Brian McFadden, Kian Egan, Shane Filan, MacCarthy	Mac	3:01
18.	"Every Little Thing You Do"	Mac, Hector, Ballard, Siedah Garrett	Mac	4:12
30.	"Don't Get Me Wrong" (hidden track)	Jake, Anders von Hofsten	Jake, Romdhane, Larossi	3:43

Coast to Coast – UK reissue bonus videos
No.	Title	Writer(s)	Director(s)	Length
1.	"Against All Odds" (with Mariah Carey)	Phil Collins	Bill Boatman & P. Snyde	3:19
2.	"I Have a Dream"	Benny Andersson, Björn Ulvaeus	Cameron Casey	3:21
3.	"I Lay My Love on You"	Elofsson, Magnusson, Kreuger	Stuart Gosling	3:29

Notes

- "Against All Odds" or "Against All Odds (Take a Look at Me Now)".
- Tracks 19 to 29 do not contain any audio.
- Track 30 is a hidden bonus track not credited on the album.

== Personnel ==
- Joakim Agnas – Piccolo Trumpet
- John Amatiello – Assistant
- Dick Beetham – Mastering
- Martin Brannigan – Arranger
- Mariah Carey – Vocals, producer, vocal arrangement
- Andreas Carlsson – Vocals (background)
- Dana Jon Chappelle – Engineer
- Simon Cowell – Executive Producer
- Andy Earl – Photography
- Björn Engelmann – Mastering Cutting Room Studios
- Brian Garten – Digital Editing
- Paul Gendler – Guitar, Guitar (Electric)
- Wayne Hector – Vocals (background), Vocal Arrangement
- Matt Howe – Orchestral Arrangements, Mixing Engineer
- Jimmy Jam – Producer
- Henrik Janson – Arranger, Conductor
- Fredrik Karlsson – Guitar (Electric)
- David Krueger – Guitar (Acoustic), Arranger, Guitar (Electric), Producer
- Josef Larossi – Mixing
- Chris Laws – Programming, Engineer
- Terry Lewis – Producer
- Gustave Lund – Percussion
- Tom Lundberg – Bass
- Steve Mac – Piano, Arranger, Keyboards, Producer, Vocal Arrangement, Mixing
- Per Magnusson – Arranger, Keyboards, Programming, Producer
- Max Martin – Vocals (background)
- Richard Niles – Assistant Engineer
- Esbjörn Öhrwall – Guitar
- Steve Pearce – Bass
- Daniel Pursey – Assistant Engineer
- Rami – Producer, Engineer
- Ake Sundqvist – Percussion
- Mary Ann Tatum – Vocals (background)
- Ulf – Arranger, Conductor
- Anders Von Hofsten – Vocals (background)
- Westlife – Vocals (background)

Source: Discogs

== Charts ==
=== Weekly charts ===
Chart (2000–01)	Peak position
Australian Albums (ARIA)	40
Austrian Albums (Ö3 Austria)	59
Belgian Albums (Ultratop Flanders)	17
Danish Albums (Hitlisten)	8
Dutch Albums (Album Top 100)	13
European Albums Chart	9
Finnish Albums (Suomen virallinen lista)	32
German Albums (Offizielle Top 100)	19
Icelandic Albums (Tónlist)	11
Irish Albums (IRMA)	1
Italian Albums (FIMI)	46
Japanese Albums (Oricon)	21
Malaysian Albums (IFPI)	1
Mexican Albums (Top 100 Mexico)	6
New Zealand Albums (RMNZ)	2
Norwegian Albums (VG-lista)	6
Portuguese Albums (AFP)	27
Scottish Albums (Official Charts)	1
Singapore Albums (SPVA)	1
Swedish Albums (Sverigetopplistan)	3
Swiss Albums (Schweizer Hitparade)	38
UK Albums (Official Charts)	1

=== Year-end charts ===
Chart (2000)	Position
Danish Albums (Hitlisten)	50
Dutch Albums (Album Top 100)	90
South Korean International Albums (MIAK)	38
UK Albums (OCC)	4
Worldwide Albums (IFPI)	43
Chart (2001)	Position
Danish Albums (Hitlisten)	99
Dutch Albums (Album Top 100)	53
European Albums (Eurochart Hot 100)	36
German Albums (Offizielle Top 100)	30
Global Albums (IFPI)	43
Swedish Albums (Sverigetopplistan)	82
UK Albums (OCC)	73

=== Decade-end charts ===
Chart (2000–2009)	Position
UK Albums (OCC)	47

== Certifications and sales ==
Region	Certification	Certified units/sales
Australia (ARIA)	Gold	35,000^{^}
Brazil (Pro-Música Brasil)	Gold	100,000^{*}
Denmark (IFPI Danmark)	Platinum	50,000^{^}
Germany (BVMI)	Gold	150,000^{^}
Ireland (IRMA)	7× Platinum	105,000^{^}
Japan (RIAJ)	Gold	100,000^{^}
Mexico (AMPROFON)	Gold	75,000^{^}
Netherlands (NVPI)	Gold	40,000^{^}
New Zealand (RMNZ)	4× Platinum	60,000^{^}
Norway (IFPI Norway)	Platinum	80,000
Philippines	—	280,000
Singapore Physical Sales	—	51,000
Singapore (RIAS)	Gold	5,000^{*}
South Korea	—	200,000
Sweden (GLF)	Platinum	80,000^{^}
Switzerland (IFPI Switzerland)	Gold	25,000^{^}
United Kingdom (BPI)	6× Platinum	1,800,000^{^}
Summaries
Asia	—	2,500,000
Europe (IFPI)	2× Platinum	2,000,000^{*}
Worldwide	—	7,000,000
^{*} Sales figures based on certification alone.^{^} Shipments figures based on certification alone.

== Release history ==
Region	Date	Formats
United Kingdom	6 November 2000	Standard
Australia	7 November 2000	Standard
Japan	15 November 2000	Standard
United Kingdom	27 November 2000	Video album (Up Close & Personal)
Europe	11 March 2001	Special
Spain	17 March 2001	Special
Mexico	22 April 2001	Special
Singapore	16 May 2001	Deluxe
Indonesia	20 May 2001	Deluxe
Asia	3 June 2001	Deluxe
Philippines	18 November 2001	Deluxe
