= I Lay My Love on You =

2001 single by Westlife

Single by Westlife

from the album Coast to Coast
- Released: 29 January 2001
- Studio: Cheiron (Stockholm)
- Length: 3:29
- Label: RCA; BMG
- Songwriters: Jörgen Elofsson; Per Magnusson; David Kreuger
- Producers: Per Magnusson; David Kreuger

Westlife singles chronology
"What Makes a Man" (2000)	"I Lay My Love on You" (2001)	"Uptown Girl" (2001)

Music video
- "I Lay My Love on You" on YouTube

"I Lay My Love on You" is a song by Irish boy band Westlife. It was released as the fourth single from their second studio album, Coast to Coast (2000), in January 2001 outside the United Kingdom and Ireland. A Spanish version of the song, "En ti deje mi amor", was also recorded and can be found on their South African-only release, Released. It is the band's 19th-most streamed song in the United Kingdom as of January 2019.

== Background ==
"I Lay My Love on You", along with "When You're Looking Like That", were not released in the UK. In an interview with Westlife, Mark Feehily said that the main reason behind it was because they had not had as much exposure in Asia and Australia.

== Music video ==
The music video features Westlife's activities in Asia, including South Korea, Japan, and Singapore. Many parts of the video was also shot in Singapore. It also features the band promoting their latest studio album at the time, Coast to Coast. The video also interspersed with the band singing.

== Track listings ==
CD1

1. "I Lay My Love on You" (Single Remix) – 3:29
2. "Dreams Come True" – 3:07
- CD1 is cased within a digipak and comes with four limited edition photocards.

CD2

1. "I Lay My Love on You" (Single Remix) – 3:29
2. "Dreams Come True" – 3:07
3. "My Love" – 3:52
4. "Nothing Is Impossible" – 3:15

== Credits and personnel ==
Recording

- Recorded at Cheiron Studios, Stockholm, Sweden
- Strings recorded at Roam Studios, Stockholm, Sweden

Personnel

- Per Magnusson – songwriter, producer, arranger, keyboards, programming
- David Kreuger – songwriter, producer, arranger, programming
- Jörgen Elofsson – songwriter
- Björn Norén – strings recording
- Bernard Löhr – mixing
- Esbjörn Öhrwall – acoustic, electric and slide guitars
- Tomas Lindberg – bass
- Gustave Lund – percussion
- Anders von Hofsten – additional backing vocals
- Björn Engelmann – mastering

== Charts ==
=== Weekly charts ===
Chart (2001)	Peak position
Australia (ARIA)	29
Austria (Ö3 Austria Top 40)	23
Belgium (Ultratop 50 Flanders)	35
Europe (Eurochart Hot 100)	55
Europe (European Hit Radio)	19
Germany (GfK)	50
Italy (FIMI)	23
Italy (Musica e dischi)	22
Italy Airplay (Music & Media)	18
Netherlands (Dutch Top 40)	20
Netherlands (Single Top 100)	12
Netherlands Airplay (Music & Media)	7
New Zealand (Recorded Music NZ)	24
Norway (VG-lista)	16
Poland Airplay (Music & Media)	14
Poland Airplay (Polish Airplay Charts)	13
Spain (Promusicae)	20
Spain Airplay (Top 40 Radio)	31
Sweden (Sverigetopplistan)	10
Switzerland (Schweizer Hitparade)	39

=== Year-end charts ===
Chart (2001)	Rank
Sweden (Hitlistan)	91

== Release history ==
Region	Date	Format(s)	Label(s)	Ref.
Denmark	29 January 2001	CD	RCA; BMG	
Sweden	29 January 2001	CD	RCA; BMG	
Australia	19 February 2001	CD	RCA; BMG	
Japan	21 February 2001	CD	BMG Japan	
