= Alexandra Talomaa =

Swedish songwriter (born 1975)

Alexandra Talomaa (born 1975) is a Swedish songwriter who has written songs for A-Teens, Anders Fernette (previously Johansson), Backstreet Boys, Darin, Westlife and others.
