= Fool Again =

2000 single by Westlife

Single by Westlife

from the album Westlife
- B-side: "Tunnel of Love"
- Released: 27 March 2000
- Studio: Cheiron (Stockholm, Sweden)
- Length: 3:53
- Label: RCA; BMG
- Songwriters: Jörgen Elofsson; Per Magnusson; David Kreuger
- Producers: Per Magnusson; David Kreuger

Westlife singles chronology
"I Have a Dream" / "Seasons in the Sun" (1999)	"Fool Again" (2000)	"Against All Odds" (2000)

Music video
- "Fool Again" on YouTube

"Fool Again" is a song by Irish boy band Westlife. It was released on 27 March 2000 as the fifth and last single from their self-titled debut album (1999). The song debuted and peaked at number two in the band's native Ireland, making it the first Westlife song not to top the Irish chart. It became the band's fifth consecutive UK number-one single and spent 12 weeks on charts. In the UK, it is the band's 14th-best-selling single in paid-for sales as well as their 13th-best-selling single in combined sales as of January 2019.

== Composition ==
"Fool Again" was composed in the traditional verse–chorus form in E major, with Filan and Feehily's vocal ranging from the chords of B_{3} to A♯_{5}.

== Music video ==
The music video for Fool Again was filmed in Mexico City, primarily at the Plaza de la Constitución (Zócalo) and the Palacio Nacional, with additional scenes at the Torres de Satélite.

== Track listings ==
UK CD single

1. "Fool Again" (2000 remix)
2. "Tunnel of Love"
3. "Fool Again" (enhanced section)

UK cassette single and European CD single

1. "Fool Again" (2000 remix)
2. "Tunnel of Love"

== Credits and personnel ==
Credits are lifted from the UK CD single and Westlife liner notes.

Studios

- Recorded and mixed at Cheiron Studios (Stockholm, Sweden)
- Strings recorded at Soundtrade Studios (Stockholm, Sweden)
- Mastered at Cutting Room (Stockholm, Sweden)

Personnel

- Jörgen Elofsson – writing
- Per Magnusson – writing, keyboards, production, arrangement, programming
- David Kreuger – writing, arrangement, programming
- Andreas Carlsson – additional backing vocals
- Anders von Hofsten – additional backing vocals
- Esbjörn Öhrwall – acoustic and electric guitars
- Mats Berntoft – acoustic and electric guitars
- John Doe – drums
- Gustave Lund – percussion
- Ulf & Henrik Janson – string arrangement
- David Kreuger – production
- Ronny Lahti – mixing
- Björn Engelmann – mastering

== Charts ==
=== Weekly charts ===
Chart (2000)	Peak position
Belgium (Ultratop 50 Flanders)	38
Croatia (HRT)	6
Czech Republic (IFPI)	21
Europe (Eurochart Hot 100)	9
Europe (European Hit Radio)	29
Finland Airplay (Radiosoittolista)	9
Germany (GfK)	80
Guatemala (Notimex)	8
Iceland (Íslenski Listinn Topp 40)	1
India (The Tribune)	3
Ireland (IRMA)	2
Italy (Musica e dischi)	46
Netherlands (Dutch Top 40)	13
Netherlands (Single Top 100)	23
Scottish Singles Sales (Official Charts)	1
Sweden (Sverigetopplistan)	5
Switzerland (Schweizer Hitparade)	39
UK Singles (Official Charts)	1
UK Airplay (Music Week)	8

=== Year-end charts ===
Chart (2000)	Position
Iceland (Íslenski Listinn Topp 40)	49
Ireland (IRMA)	31
Sweden (Hitlistan)	66
UK Singles (OCC)	61

== Certifications and sales ==
Region	Certification	Certified units/sales
Sweden (GLF)	Gold	15,000^{^}
United Kingdom (BPI)	Gold	400,000^{‡}
^{^} Shipments figures based on certification alone.^{‡} Sales+streaming figures based on certification alone.
