= Swear It Again =

1999 single by Westlife

- Standard European artwork

Single by Westlife

from the album Westlife
- B-side: "Forever"
- Released: 19 April 1999
- Studio: Rokstone (London, England)
- Length: 4:07
- Label: RCA; BMG
- Songwriters: Steve Mac; Wayne Hector
- Producer: Steve Mac

Westlife singles chronology
"Swear It Again" (1999)	"If I Let You Go" (1999)

Music videos
- "Swear It Again" on YouTube; "Swear It Again" (US version) on YouTube

UK CD2

"Swear It Again" is a song by Irish boy band Westlife. The ballad was released on 19 April 1999 in the United Kingdom as the first single from their self-titled debut album (1999). The song peaked at number one on the UK Singles Chart for two weeks, giving Westlife their first of 14 UK number-one singles. "Swear It Again" is Westlife's only single to have charted in the US, peaking at number 20 on the Billboard Hot 100 and ranking number 75 on the Billboard Hot 100 year-end chart in 2000.

The single has sold over 600,000 copies in the UK and has achieved platinum status there. It is the band's fifth-best-selling single in combined sales and seventh-best-selling single in paid-for sales in the UK as of January 2019.

== Background ==
In Westlife - Our Story the band recalled being "excited" hearing the demo of this song saying "Wow, this is a great song. It's a big chorus, great harmonies. This is exactly what we want to be recording".

"Swear It Again" is notable for being, along with "Flying Without Wings", one of the first two songs that Steve Mac wrote for both Westlife and Simon Cowell. The success of the two tracks led to Mac becoming Cowell's preferred producer and songwriter. It was revealed that Cowell let his father Eric listen to all of the songs recorded by the group for their debut album to decide what would be the album's lead single, with Eric choosing "Swear It Again". Significantly, Eric died of a heart attack during the week the single was released.

The song's B-side, "Forever", was a significant choice because, as originally recorded by Damage, it first alerted Cowell to the talent of Steve Mac and then led to the producer working with Westlife. It was composed in the traditional verse–chorus form in A major, with Filan and Feehily's vocal ranging from the chords of B_{3} to F♯_{5}.

An exclusive live track version of the single was included in the Arista Records 25th anniversary compilation album in 2000.

== Music video ==
The original version of the video was not released. Simon Cowell had spent £150,000 on it, didn't like it and ordered a re-shoot.

The remade British music video features the band members in a mini theatre and singing on a stage fitted with lighting panel flooring while they face a screen with black-and-white videos of their studio recording process. This version was directed by Wayne Isham and aired in May 1999. The video was shot at Pinewood Studios in March 1999.

The American music video features the band members at a car wash and subsequently washing a white car as they're singing the song. This version was directed by Nigel Dick and aired in June 2000.

== Honours and awards ==
Year	Ceremony	Category	Result
2001	BMI Awards	Pop Award	Won
2018	Billboard	Best Boyband Songs of All-time (69th)	Won

== Track listings ==
UK CD1

1. "Swear It Again" (radio edit) – 4:04
2. "Forever" – 5:05
3. CD-ROM (includes filmed interview with Ronan Keating + video clips)

UK CD2

1. "Swear It Again" (radio edit) – 4:04
2. "Swear It Again" (Rokstone mix) – 4:07
3. "Ronan Keating Interviews Westlife" (audio) – 3:36

UK cassette single

1. "Swear It Again" (radio edit) – 4:04
2. "Forever" – 5:05
3. "Ronan Keating Interviews Westlife" (audio) – 3:36

European CD single

1. "Swear It Again" (radio edit) – 4:04
2. "Forever" – 5:05

US CD and cassette single

1. "Swear It Again" – 4:06
2. Snippets from Westlife

Australian CD single

1. "Swear It Again" (radio edit) – 4:04
2. "Swear It Again" (Rokstone mix) – 4:07
3. "Forever" – 5:05
4. "Ronan Keating Interviews Westlife" (audio) – 3:36
5. CD-ROM (includes filmed interview with Ronan Keating + video clips)

Australian and Japanese CD EP

1. "Swear It Again" (radio edit) – 4:04
2. "Until the End of Time" – 3:10
3. "Forever" – 5:05
4. "Everybody Knows" – 3:45
5. "Let's Make Tonight Special" – 4:52
6. "Don't Calm the Storm" – 3:46
7. "Ronan Keating Interviews Westlife" (audio) – 3:37

== Credits and personnel ==
Credits are lifted from the UK CD1 and Westlife liner notes.

Studio

- Engineered and programmed at Rokstone Studios (London, England)

Personnel

- Steve Mac – writing, all keyboards, production, mixing, vocal arrangement
- Wayne Hector – writing, vocal arrangement
- Paul Gendler – all guitars
- Richard Niles – string arrangement
- Chris Laws – engineering, programming
- Matt Howe – mix engineering
- Daniel Pursey – mixing assistant

== Charts ==
=== Weekly charts ===
Chart (1999–2000)	Peak position
Australia (ARIA)	12
Belgium (Ultratop 50 Flanders)	10
Canada Top Singles (RPM)	28
Canada Adult Contemporary (RPM)	22
Europe (Eurochart Hot 100)	6
Europe (European Hit Radio)	42
Iceland (Íslenski Listinn Topp 40)	31
Ireland (IRMA)	1
Netherlands (Dutch Top 40)	23
Netherlands (Single Top 100)	27
New Zealand (Recorded Music NZ)	1
Scottish Singles Sales (Official Charts)	2
Spain (Promusicae)	20
Spain Airplay (Top 40 Radio)	18
Sweden (Sverigetopplistan)	12
Switzerland (Schweizer Hitparade)	25
UK Singles (Official Charts)	1
UK Airplay (Music Week)	9
US Billboard Hot 100	20
US Adult Contemporary (Billboard)	22
US Pop Airplay (Billboard)	21
US Adult Contemporary (Radio & Records)	21
US CHR/Pop Top 50 (Radio & Records)	21

=== Year-end charts ===
Chart (1999)	Position
Australia (ARIA)	79
Belgium (Ultratop 50 Flanders)	62
Netherlands (Dutch Top 40)	161
New Zealand (RIANZ)	40
Romania (Romanian Top 100)	95
UK Singles (OCC)	46

Chart (2000)	Position
US Billboard Hot 100	75
US Mainstream Top 40 (Billboard)	72
US Adult Contemporary (Radio & Records)	49
US CHR/Pop (Radio & Records)	63

== Certifications and sales ==
Region	Certification	Certified units/sales
Australia (ARIA)	Gold	35,000^{^}
New Zealand (RMNZ)	Gold	5,000^{*}
New Zealand (RMNZ) digital	Gold	15,000^{‡}
United Kingdom (BPI)	Platinum	600,000^{‡}
United States (RIAA)	Gold	600,000
^{*} Sales figures based on certification alone.^{^} Shipments figures based on certification alone.^{‡} Sales+streaming figures based on certification alone.

== Release history ==
Region	Date	Format(s)	Label(s)	Ref(s).
United Kingdom	19 April 1999	CD; cassette	RCA; BMG	
Sweden	3 May 1999	CD	RCA; BMG	
Japan	22 September 1999	CD	RCA; BMG	
United States	January 2000	Contemporary hit radio	Arista	
United States	February 2000	CD; cassette	Arista	
United States	13 March 2000	Adult contemporary radio	Arista	
