= My Love (Westlife song) =

2000 single by Westlife

Single by Westlife

from the album Coast to Coast
- Released: 30 October 2000
- Studio: Cheiron (Stockholm, Sweden)
- Length: 3:52
- Label: RCA; BMG
- Songwriters: Jörgen Elofsson; Per Magnusson; David Kreuger; Pelle Nylén
- Producers: Per Magnusson; David Kreuger

Westlife singles chronology
"Against All Odds" (2000)	"My Love" (2000)	"What Makes a Man" (2000)

CD2 artwork

Music video
- "My Love" on YouTube

"My Love" is a song by the Irish boy band Westlife. It was released on 30 October 2000 as the second single from their second studio album, Coast to Coast (2000). The song debuted at number one on the UK Singles Chart, giving the band their seventh UK number one. The song was the 35th best-selling single of 2000 in the UK. It also won The Record of the Year in 2000. It has sold 400,000 copies in the UK.

In South Korea, the single stayed in the top 75 of the Official International Karaoke Charts since the inception of the charts in December 2010 up to its recent chart released. On 12 May 2018, the song was performed on South Korean music programme 'Immortal Songs 2' by Eric Nam. Band member Shane Filan was the featured 'Legend' and judged the participants.

== Background ==
The song was written by Jörgen Elofsson, Per Magnusson, David Kreuger, and Pelle Nylén and it was produced by Magnusson and Kreuger. The song, "My Love" is written in the key of C major, and their vocals span from E_{3} to A_{4}. The song is said to be inspired by the hit single "Mull of Kintyre" by Wings.

It is the band's eleventh best-selling single of all time in both paid-for and combined sales categories in the UK as of January 2019. It's also their fifth most-streamed single with 1.17 million across video and audio in the United Kingdom as of January 2019. While it is their seventh most streamed song of all time from their home country, the Republic of Ireland, as of 2 April 2019. As of January 2021, this is the most successful and popular single of the band on YouTube.

== Music video ==
The music video was directed by Robert Brinkmann. The opening scene features the band members waiting at Shannon Airport, where Nicky Byrne informs them that the last flight out has just been canceled. The band members become upset by the news, then Brian McFadden says that it would be "quicker walking" and that he's going. The others follow him and the song begins.

The first stanza takes place inside the airport and during the chorus, the scene shifts to Catherine Place in Limerick city. Harstonge House (or Oznam House as it is also known) on Harstonge Street can be seen in the video as the band members walk down the street. After the end of the first chorus, the scene shifts to Colbert train station in Limerick. Then again during the second chorus, the scene changes to Lahinch Beach in County Clare. During the final chorus, the band members sing atop the Cliffs of Moher, County Clare.

In April 2017, the video exceeded 100 million views on YouTube, becoming Westlife's first official video ever to get Vevo certified. It is the most-watched video on Westlife's YouTube channel.

== Track listings ==
UK CD1

1. "My Love" (radio edit)
2. "If I Let You Go" (USA mix)
3. Enhanced section

UK CD2

1. "My Love" (radio edit)
2. "My Love" (instrumental)
3. Enhanced section

UK cassette single and European CD single

1. "My Love" (radio edit)
2. "If I Let You Go" (USA mix)

Australian CD single

1. "My Love" (radio edit)
2. "If I Let You Go" (USA mix)
3. "My Love" (instrumental)
4. Enhanced section

== Credits and personnel ==
Credits are adapted from the UK CD1 liner notes.

Recording

- Recorded at Cheiron Studios, Stockholm, Sweden
- Orchestra recorded at Roam Studios, Stockholm, Sweden

Personnel

- Per Magnusson – songwriting, production, arrangement, keyboards, programming
- David Kreuger – songwriting, production, arrangement, programming
- Jörgen Elofsson – songwriting
- Pelle Nylén – songwriting
- Ulf and Erik Jansson – arrangement and Stockholm Session Orchestra conducting
- Björn Norén – orchestra recording
- Bernard Löhr – mixing
- Esbjörn Öhrwall – acoustic and electric guitars
- Thomas Lindberg – bass
- Gustave Lund – percussion
- Åke Sundqvist – percussion
- Joakim Agnas – piccolo trumpet
- Anders von Hofsten – additional backing vocals
- Björn Engelmann – mastering

== Charts ==
=== Weekly charts ===
Chart (2000–2001)	Peak position
Australia (ARIA)	36
Belgium (Ultratop 50 Flanders)	6
Belgium (Ultratip Bubbling Under Wallonia)	14
Croatia (HRT)	3
Denmark (IFPI)	6
Europe (Eurochart Hot 100)	3
Europe (European Hit Radio)	14
Finland Airplay (Radiosoittolista)	12
Germany (GfK)	57
Iceland (Íslenski Listinn Topp 40)	2
Ireland (IRMA)	1
Italy (FIMI)	29
Italy (Musica e dischi)	20
Netherlands (Dutch Top 40)	10
Netherlands (Single Top 100)	9
Netherlands Airplay (Music & Media)	2
New Zealand (Recorded Music NZ)	3
Norway (VG-lista)	3
Poland Airplay (Polish Airplay Charts)	4
Scottish Singles Sales (Official Charts)	1
Spain Airplay (Top 40 Radio)	25
Sweden (Sverigetopplistan)	1
Switzerland (Schweizer Hitparade)	38
UK Singles (Official Charts)	1
UK Airplay (Music Week)	5

=== Year-end charts ===
Chart (2000)	Position
Ireland (IRMA)	13
Netherlands (Single Top 100)	100
Sweden (Hitlistan)	28
Taiwan (Hito Radio)	16
UK Singles (OCC)	35

Chart (2001)	Position
Europe (European Hit Radio)	85
New Zealand (RIANZ)	43
Taiwan (Hito Radio)	24

== Certifications ==
Region	Certification	Certified units/sales
New Zealand (RMNZ)	Gold	15,000^{‡}
Sweden (GLF)	Gold	15,000^{^}
United Kingdom (BPI)	Platinum	600,000^{‡}
^{^} Shipments figures based on certification alone.^{‡} Sales+streaming figures based on certification alone.

== Release history ==
Region	Date	Format(s)	Label(s)	Ref.
United Kingdom	30 October 2000	CD; cassette	RCA; BMG	
Japan	15 November 2000	CD	RCA; BMG	
