= Per Magnusson =

Swedish music producer and songwriter (born 1969)

- Born: Per Magnusson; 30 May 1969 (age 57); Tyresö, Sweden
- Origin: Stockholm, Sweden
- Genres: Pop; Classical
- Occupations: Songwriter; Producer
- Instruments: Keyboard, guitar, bass guitar, cello
- Years active: 1991–present
- Website: A Side Productions

Per Magnusson (born 30 May 1969) is a Swedish music producer and songwriter. His musical career took off in 1994 as one of the original team members of the now-legendary Cheiron Productions, meeting great international success working with Boyzone, Britney Spears, Westlife and the Backstreet Boys.

Shortly after Cheiron decided to shut down its studios in 2000, Per together with David Kreuger formed A Side Productions, having continued to produce and write songs for major artists such as Il Divo, Céline Dion, Josh Groban, Shayne Ward and Paul Potts.

To date the duo has co-written and / or produced six UK No. 1 singles:

- "If I Let You Go" (Westlife)
- "Fool Again" (Westlife)
- "My Love" (Westlife)
- "Evergreen" (Will Young)
- "Anyone of Us (Stupid Mistake)" (Gareth Gates)
- "That's My Goal" (Shayne Ward)

In April 2008 Leona Lewis became the first British female ever to open at No 1 on the Billboard 200. Her debut album Spirit includes the song "Footprints in the Sand", co-written by Magnusson and Kreuger.

== Musical career ==
=== The early years ===
Per Magnusson was born and raised in Tyresö on the outskirts of Stockholm. His interest in music was developed already while attending primary school, picking up the cello as his main instrument playing it for the next ten years.

Over time, his commitment in pop & rock music became more and more predominantly. As a teenager, Per played both the guitar and keyboards in different local bands, but eventually decided to focus on producing, arranging and writing music.

His first significant record appearance came in 1994 on the Swedish artist Jennifer Brown's album Giving You the Best. Besides taking part as a musician, Per produced the song "Take a Piece of My Heart" which also was released as a single.

About that time, Per coincidentally met with David Kreuger whom worked on the DJ scene in Stockholm. They started collaborating and have continued producing and writing songs as a team ever since.

=== Denniz PoP & Cheiron Studios ===
Denniz PoP had by the early '90s become one of the most skillful and coveted DJs in the clubs of Stockholm. In 1993 he decided to start working with artists and founded Cheiron Productions together with Tom Talomaa. Its studios were located at Fridhemsplan in Stockholm, soon evolving into a great success.

After presenting one of their songs to Denniz Pop, Per and David were invited to join as songwriters and producers. They subsequently worked with a range of artists, achieving notable success in 1998 by co-writing and producing “Will Be Yours” for Boyzone’s album Where We Belong, which became the group’s third consecutive UK number-one release.

By now Cheiron studios was one of the hottest in the world, each team member working with a different artist. But in August 1998 Cheiron shocked the music world sending out a press release that its leader Denniz PoP had died. He was only 35 years old.

=== On top of the US charts with Britney ===
Just a couple of months earlier, Cheiron had started working on songs for the 16-year-old Britney Spears' debut album. Per and David produced Spear's second single "Sometimes" as well as her third, "(You Drive Me) Crazy", which they co-wrote with Max Martin and Jörgen Elofsson. Both singles became huge worldwide hits. The album ...Baby One More Time was released in the US in January 1999 and debuted at No 1 on the Billboard 200 where it spent six weeks straight.

Together, Per and David also worked with Britney on her second album Oops!…I Did It Again, co-writing and co-producing "What U See (Is What U Get)" and producing "Girl in the Mirror". The album came out in the US in May 2000 and equally as the first, it shot to No 1.

=== First UK No 1s ===
Per and David's success on the UK Singles Chart soon followed. Westlife had approached Cheiron for material to their upcoming self-titled debut album and the duo co-wrote three songs which they also produced. "If I Let You Go" was released in August 1999 as Westlife's ever second single. It went straight to No 1 becoming Per and David's first top position in the UK. "Fool Again", which came out in March 2000 as the fifth single taken from the same album, became the duo's second in less than seven months.

By the end of that same year, Westlife issued their follow-up album Coast to Coast. Five songs co-written and / or produced by the tandem had found their way onto the record. "My Love" hit the UK record stores in October as the album's first single. It entered the charts at No 1. The close collaboration between Westlife and Per and David has continued ever since.

The Backstreet Boys had in 1999 broken nearly every record in the book with their album Millennium. In 2000 the group turned to Per and David for help on their next, titled Black & Blue, which was released in November. Including the tandem's productions of "It's True" and "The Answer to Our Life", the record became another huge international success selling more than 12 million copies.

These recordings turned out to be some of Cheiron's last before closing up. By the end of 2000, at the top of the industry, the studio's songwriters and producers decided to go separate ways.

=== A Side Productions is formed ===
Shortly after the shutdown of Cheiron Studios, Per and David formed A Side Productions, their own production company. Located in the center of Stockholm, the duo soon embarked on several major projects including working on Westlife's third album World of Our Own. Together they co-wrote and produced four songs which all appear on the album. One of the songs was "Evergreen", that soon was about to enter Guinness World Records. Released in the UK in November 2001, the album instantly shot to No 1.

In February 2002 Will Young became the first winner of Pop Idol, a new British reality talent show that was followed by spin offs all around the world, in the US named American Idol. Will Young's debut single was the double A-side "Anything is Possible" / "Evergreen", released in the UK on 25 February. The single instantaneously made it into the history books by becoming the Fastest Selling Debut Single for the First Day as well as First Week. Co-written and co-produced by Per and David, "Evergreen" spent three consecutive weeks atop of the Top 40. More amazingly, in 2009 the single still holds the No 11th position on the UK Top 100 List of Best Selling Singles of all time.

Pop Idol runner-up that season was Gareth Gates and just like Will Young he recorded "Evergreen", which was included on his first single. Released in March, Gareth Gates knocked his rival off the No 1 spot, subsequently holding his position for four weeks straight.

Gareth Gates' second success on the charts came only four months later, on 14 July, with his follow-up "Anyone of Us (Stupid Mistake)". The song, also co-written and produced by Per and David, spent three weeks at No 1. This was the duo's 5th top position in the UK.

=== Il Divo brings opera to the pop charts ===
Already in 2001 Simon Cowell had come up with a new concept featuring four male singers interpreting romantic songs opera-style. Two years later, after numerous auditions across the globe, Il Divo was formed. The quartet's self-titled debut album was scheduled for release in the fall of 2004 and one of its first destinations was A Side Productions' studios for recordings. Including the productions of Ennio Morricone's "Nella Fantasia" and "Ti Amerò", which Per and David also had co-written exclusively for the group, the album Il Divo was released in the UK on 6 November. It instantly went to No 1 and remained in the Top 5 throughout the year. In the US the album was issued on April 19, 2005, rushing straight to No 4 on the Billboard 200.

Only months later, Il Divo had reached No 1 in 12 countries, Top 5 in another 25 and sold more than 4 million copies.

In 2005 Céline Dion started working on a new album, her first French compilation titled On Ne Changes Pas, including three new songs. Per and David co-wrote and produced "I Believe in You", a duet with Il Divo. Dion's album was released on 3 October and reached No 1 in Quebec, Belgium and France where it held the position for seven weeks straight subsequently spending an entire year on the chart.

Per and David's duet "I Believe in You" was also included on Il Divo's follow-up album Ancora. Along with three more songs produced by the tandem, the quartet's record was released on 7 November 2005. It hit No 1 in the UK and Australia within one week. Released in the US on January 24, 2006, Ancora entered the Billboard 200 at No 1 after selling more than 150,000 copies in its first week. Il Divo's third album, Siempre, also including four songs co-written and / or produced by Per and David, was released by the end of November 2006. Across their first three albums, Il Divo achieved 36 No 1's, selling more than 22 million records worldwide.

=== The X Factor & Britain's Got Talent ===
The X Factor was devised in 2004 as a replacement for the massively successful Pop Idol, which in the UK had been put on indefinite hold. In the second-season finale, aired on 17 December 2005, Shayne Ward was crowned winner after performing the newly written song "That's My Goal". Produced by Per and David, it was released as Ward's debut single only four days later, shooting straight to No 1. By selling an astonishing 310,000 copies in the first day, "That's My Goal" entered the Top 4 list of the Fastest Selling UK Singles of all time.

On March 4, 2007, Paul Potts entered the stage in front of the skeptical looking jury of Britain's Got Talent. Ninety seconds later he made YouTube history with his rendition of Puccini's "Nessun Dorma". Potts had wowed the jury as well as the 2,000-strong audience which gave him a standing ovation. Still working as a mobile phone salesman in Wales, the unexpected tenor on June 17 won the whole show.

Going straight into the music studios recording songs for his debut album, now with a full symphony orchestra backing him up in the world-famous AIR Studios in London, Potts recorded three songs produced by Per and David, "Nessun Dorma", "Con Te Partirò" and "Nella Fantasia". The album One Chance was released in the UK on 16 July. 2007 and with first week sales exceeding 128,000 copies Potts shot straight to No 1 outselling the rest of his Top 10 rivals combined. The newly discovered tenor held the position for three consecutive weeks.

=== Working with Katherine Jenkins and Leona Lewis ===
Per and David were in 2007 involved in several other projects including working with Katherine Jenkins, the Welsh award-winning and best-selling classical crossover superstar. In 2004, at the age of 24, she became the fastest selling mezzo-soprano of all time with her debut album titled Première. By the end of 2005, as the first singer in musical history, Jenkins simultaneously held the number 1, 2 and 3 positions in the UK's Classical Chart with her three albums. Her fifth album, Rejoice including four songs produced by Per and David, was released on 19 November 2007. It entered the UK Album Chart at No 3.

In 2006, more than 100,000 hopeful "artists to be" applied to the auditions for The X Factor season three, the previous season won by Shayne Ward. Leona Lewis was crowned the winner on 16 December, soon breaking sales records with her first single. Deciding not to push the young singer's debut album release, Lewis instead went to the US to sign a lucrative record deal with Clive Davis, founder of Arista Records. Set for domestic release in late 2007, the album's recordings were coordinated in music studios around the US as well as in London. One of the songs was "Footprints in the Sand", written by Per and David together with Richard Page.

The album, titled Spirit, reached UK record stores on 12 November. With sales surpassing 375,000 copies in its first week of release, Spirit is the fastest selling British debut album of all time. It spent seven weeks straight at No 1 on the Top 40. Released in the US almost five months later, on April 8, 2008, Spirit instantly shot to the top spot. This resulted in Leona Lewis becoming the first British female ever to debut at No 1 on the Billboard 200.

Re-released in the UK almost exactly one year later, on 17 November 2008, Lewis' Spirit The Deluxe Edition bounced back to the top of the charts to give Per and David a second consecutive No. 1, as the bestseller that previous week was Il Divo's The Promise which included the tandem's production of "L'Alba Del Mondo".

== See also ==
- The Official Website of A Side Productions
- A Side Productions on MySpace
- Interview, HitQuarters Aug 2009
