= What Makes a Man =

2000 single by Westlife

Single by Westlife

from the album Coast to Coast
- Released: 18 December 2000
- Studio: Rokstone (London)
- Length: 3:52
- Label: RCA; BMG
- Songwriters: Wayne Hector; Steve Mac
- Producer: Steve Mac

Westlife singles chronology
"My Love" (2000)	"What Makes a Man" (2000)	"I Lay My Love on You" (2001)

Music video
- "What Makes a Man" on YouTube

"What Makes a Man CD2"

"What Makes a Man" is a song by Irish boy band Westlife. It was released on 18 December 2000 in the UK and Ireland as the third single from their second studio album, Coast to Coast. The song peaked at number two on the UK Singles Chart and was their first single not to peak at number one, being beaten to the Christmas number-one spot by "Can We Fix It?", the theme to the cartoon series Bob the Builder. It also charted in Croatia and Ireland, reaching the top five in both countries.

The song was the 39th-best-selling single of 2000 in the UK and received a gold sales certification for over 400,000 copies sold. It is the band's fifth-best-selling single in paid-for sales, and seventh-best-selling single in combined sales as of January 2019.

== Background ==
"What Makes a Man" was composed in the traditional verse–chorus form in B major, with Filan and Feehily's vocal ranging from the chords of E_{4} to B♭_{5}.

== Reception ==
Brian McFadden of Westlife had little faith in the release. Speaking in an interview with Worldpop.com, he remarked: "It's a weak song, and we didn't do much promotional work. Bob [the Builder] deserved it."

== Track listings ==
UK CD1 and cassette single

1. "What Makes a Man" (single remix)
2. "I'll Be There"
3. "My Girl"

UK CD2

1. "What Makes a Man" (single remix)
2. "I'll Be There"
3. "What Becomes of the Brokenhearted"

== Charts ==
=== Weekly charts ===
Chart (2000–2001)	Peak position
Croatia (HRT)	4
Europe (Eurochart Hot 100)	10
Ireland (IRMA)	2
Scottish Singles Sales (Official Charts)	2
UK Singles (Official Charts)	2
UK Airplay (Music Week)	14

=== Year-end charts ===
Chart (2000)	Position
Ireland (IRMA)	37
UK Singles (OCC)	39

Chart (2001)	Position
Ireland (IRMA)	61

== Certifications and sales ==
Region	Certification	Certified units/sales
United Kingdom (BPI)	Gold	400,000^{^}
^{^} Shipments figures based on certification alone.
