= Flying Without Wings =

1999 single by Westlife

- One of several European artworks

Single by Westlife

from the album Westlife and Pokémon: The Movie 2000 soundtrack
- B-side: "Everybody Knows"; "That's What It's All About"
- Released: 18 October 1999
- Studio: Rokstone (London, England)
- Genre: Pop
- Length: 3:36
- Label: RCA; BMG
- Songwriters: Steve Mac; Wayne Hector
- Producer: Steve Mac

Westlife singles chronology
"If I Let You Go" (1999)	"Flying Without Wings" (1999)	"I Have a Dream" / "Seasons in the Sun" (1999)

Music video
- "Flying Without Wings" on YouTube

"Flying Without Wings" is a song by Irish boy band Westlife, released on 18 October 1999 as the third single from their self-titled debut studio album (1999). It is the band's fourth-best-selling single on both paid-for and combined sales in the United Kingdom as of January 2019.

== Background ==
The song was written by Wayne Hector and Steve Mac. In an interview with HitQuarters, Hector said the basic idea for the song came to him while on a break from working on a hip hop session with Ezi Cut in Los Angeles:

I came up with a couple of lines for the first verse and then phoned my mama's house, left it on the answering machine, and said, "Don't get rid of this!"

Upon returning to England, Hector went into the studio to work on the idea with long-time songwriting partner and producer Steve Mac. When the two discussed what the song was about they agreed that "this is about our wives. This is about the things that make our lives complete." According to Hector the lyrics were completed in about half an hour. He added, "Flying Without Wings was a life-changing moment, and a song he says he is particularly proud of. A big moment for me was when Flying Without Wings came out, I'd had a few Number 1s at that point, but that convinced people I could write good pop songs. After that, I started working with bigger acts and over a more diverse range of genres, including country and rock, which helped me pick up some credibility." The band's manager later revealed the song had been planned as the first solo single for Boyzone's Stephen Gately. "Stephen did the demo and he thought it was going to be his song," Louis Walsh recalls. "I'll be quite honest, I missed it, but as soon as Simon heard it he just went bananas. It was really difficult because Westlife were on tour with Boyzone, as the support act."

In a documentary aired on UTV called Westlife Back Home, band member Shane Filan said it is probably the best song of their career, while former Taoiseach Bertie Ahern (band member Nicky Byrne's father-in-law) revealed it is his favourite tune from the chart-topping band. The song also won the band their first of four Record of the Year prizes on the annual televised ITV music awards on 11 December 1999, scoring a total of 159,590 votes to beat Boyzone's Ronan Keating to the title.

The Official Charts Company stated, "Flying Without Wings wasn't the first boyband ballad, nor is it the biggest selling, but it was certainly influential. After Flying Without Wings, what self-respecting boyband would dare stay seated on a stool for a key change? Stand, boys! Flying Without Wings has soundtracked births, proposals, marriages, funerals, and untold TV talent show montages over the last two decades."

== Commercial performance ==
The song became the group's third UK number-one single, spending 13 weeks on charts. It also received a platinum sales certification in the UK and has sold over 800,000 copies with 37 million streams there as of November 2021.

== Track listings ==
UK and Australian CD1

1. "Flying Without Wings" – 3:35
2. "Everybody Knows" – 4:09
3. CR-ROM

UK and Australian CD2

1. "Flying Without Wings" – 3:35
2. "That's What It's All About" – 3:20
3. "Flying Without Wings" (a cappella mix) – 3:29

UK cassette single and European CD single

1. "Flying Without Wings" – 3:35
2. "Everybody Knows" – 4:09

European maxi-CD single

1. "Flying Without Wings" – 3:35
2. "Everybody Knows" – 3:45
3. "That's What It's All About" – 3:20
4. "Flying Without Wings" (a cappella mix) – 3:29
5. CR-ROM

== Credits and personnel ==
Credits are lifted from the UK CD1 and Westlife liner notes.

Studios

- Choir recorded at Avatar Studios (New York City)
- Engineered and programmed at Rokstone Studios (London, England)

Personnel

- Steve Mac – writing, all keyboards, production, mixing, arrangement, vocal arrangement
- Wayne Hector – writing, vocal arrangement
- Benny Diggs – Choir MD
- Paul Gendler – all guitars
- Steve Pearce – bass guitar
- Richard Niles – string arrangement
- Chris Laws – engineering, programming
- Matt Howe – mix engineering
- Daniel Pursey – mixing assistant

== Charts ==
=== Weekly charts ===
Chart (1999–2000, 2004)	Peak position
Australia (ARIA) with "I Have a Dream" and "Seasons in the Sun"	31
Belgium (Ultratop 50 Flanders)	7
Belgium (Ultratip Bubbling Under Wallonia)	8
Europe (Eurochart Hot 100)	10
Finland (Suomen virallinen lista)	17
Germany (GfK)	85
Iceland (Íslenski Listinn Topp 40)	19
Ireland (IRMA)	1
Netherlands (Dutch Top 40) with "I Have a Dream"	19
Netherlands (Single Top 100)	17
Netherlands Airplay (Music & Media)	12
Norway (VG-lista)	7
New Zealand (Recorded Music NZ)	6
Scotland Singles (OCC)	2
Spain Airplay (Top 40 Radio)	9
Sweden (Sverigetopplistan)	12
UK Singles (OCC)	1
UK Airplay (Music Week)	8

=== Year-end charts ===
Chart (1999)	Position
Netherlands (Dutch Top 40)	193
Sweden (Hitlistan)	67
Taiwan (Hito Radio)	69
UK Singles (OCC)	58

Chart (2000)	Position
Belgium (Ultratop 50 Flanders)	82
New Zealand (RIANZ)	43

== Certifications and sales ==
Region	Certification	Certified units/sales
New Zealand (RMNZ)	Gold	15,000^{‡}
Sweden (GLF)	Gold	15,000^{^}
United Kingdom (BPI)	Platinum	801,119
^{^} Shipments figures based on certification alone.^{‡} Sales+streaming figures based on certification alone.

== Duets ==
"Flying Without Wings"

Promotional single by Westlife featuring BoA

from the album Unbreakable: The Greatest Hits Volume 1 (Asian edition), Shine We Are! and Next World
- Released: 2003 (Asia)
- Genre: Pop
- Length: 3:36
- Label: BMG; S.M. Entertainment
- Songwriters: Wayne Hector; Steve Mac
- Producers: Lee Soo Man; Steve Mac

Audio video
- "Flying Without Wings" on YouTube

"Flying Without Wings"

Promotional single by Westlife featuring Cristian Castro

from the album Unbreakable: The Greatest Hits Volume 1 (Spanish/Mexican edition)
- Released: 2002 (Mexico)
- Genre: Pop
- Length: 3:36
- Songwriters: Wayne Hector; Steve Mac

Music video
- "Flying Without Wings" on YouTube

In 2002, as part of the promotion of their album Unbreakable: The Greatest Hits Volume 1, the song was re-recorded as a duet with Mexican singer Cristian Castro and South Korean pop singer BoA. Each duet was included on the Spanish & Asian editions of the album. Both duets were also released as singles in their two respective regions.

=== Track listing ===
- Mexico
1. "Flying Without Wings" (Duet with Cristian Castro) - 3:35
2. "Never Knew I Was Losing You" - 4:09
- Asia
1. "Flying Without Wings" (Duet with BoA) - 3:35
2. "Never Knew I Was Losing You" - 4:09

== Live version ==
In 2004, as part of the promotion for their Turnaround Tour, the band released the live version of the song. It was recorded during their tour in Stockholm Globe Arena. Their live version peaked at number one in UK Singles Chart and was the first ever number one in the UK downloads chart.

=== Track listing ===
- UK
1. "Flying Without Wings" (Live)

=== Charts ===
Chart (2004)	Peak position
UK Singles Downloads (OCC)	1

== Video album ==
A karaoke version of "Flying Without Wings" was released on DVD in 2000 and debuted at number one. It includes lyrics, photographs, and interactive menus. It has a running time of 45 minutes.

=== Track listing ===
1. "Swear It Again"
2. "If I Let You Go"
3. "Flying Without Wings"
4. "Fool Again"
5. "Seasons in the Sun"
6. "I Have a Dream"
7. "More Than Words"
8. "Against All Odds"

== Other appearances ==
The Westlife song has appeared in the 2000 Warner Bros. Pictures film Pokémon: The Movie 2000 as the final song of the credits in the film and on the official movie soundtrack. It also featured in the 2000 Australian film The Magic Pudding and 2000 French film Archibald the Koala: The Movie. It also appeared in the Korean drama I'm Sorry, I Love You and its soundtrack as well.

On 12 May 2018, the song was performed on Korean music programme 'Immortal Songs 2' by Ali who placed second place that night. Band member Shane Filan was the featured 'Legend' and judged the participants.

In 2020, the song appeared as a music background on one of McDonald's UK and Ireland advertisements.

== Ruben Studdard version ==
"Flying Without Wings"

Single by Ruben Studdard
- A-side: "Superstar"
- Released: 10 June 2003
- Recorded: 2003
- Label: J; 19; S
- Songwriters: Wayne Hector; Steve Mac
- Producers: The Underdogs; Face

Ruben Studdard singles chronology
"Flying Without Wings" / "Superstar" (2003)	"Have Yourself a Merry Little Christmas" (2003)

Music video
- "Flying Without Wings" on YouTube

"Flying Without Wings" was covered by American Idol season 2 winner Ruben Studdard as his debut single in 2003. The single was released on 10 June and charted at number two on the Billboard Hot 100 on 28 June, behind "This Is the Night" by American Idol runner-up Clay Aiken. "Flying Without Wings" also appeared on the Hot R&B/Hip-Hop Singles & Tracks chart, peaking at number 13, and the Adult Contemporary chart, reaching number 27. The double A-side single with "Superstar" was released in Canada and New Zealand, peaking at number two in both countries, behind Aiken's release.

=== Charts ===
==== Weekly charts ====
Chart (2003)	Peak position
Canada (Nielsen SoundScan) with "Superstar"	2
New Zealand (Recorded Music NZ) with "Superstar"	2
US Billboard Hot 100	2
US Adult Contemporary (Billboard)	27
US Hot R&B/Hip-Hop Songs (Billboard) with "Superstar"	1

==== Year-end charts ====
Chart (2003)	Position
US Billboard Hot 100	88

=== Certifications ===
Region	Certification	Certified units/sales
Canada (Music Canada)	3× Platinum	30,000^{^}
New Zealand (RMNZ)	Gold	5,000^{*}
United States (RIAA)	Gold	500,000^{^}
^{*} Sales figures based on certification alone.^{^} Shipments figures based on certification alone.
