= David Kreuger =

Swedish songwriter and music producer

David Kreuger is a Swedish songwriter and music producer.

== Career ==
David Kreuger began at Cheiron Studios in the spring of 1993. During the period 1993-1997, he worked with Per Magnusson on several projects. Together, they produced and wrote songs for Swedish artists such as E-Type and Leila K, but also for international groups such as Solid Harmonie and Lyte Funkie Ones. Kreuger, Magnusson, and Jörgen Elofsson worked with Boyzone on their album Where We Belong in 1997, and Britney Spears's debut studio album in 1999.

He also co-produced Leah Haywood's debut single We Think It's Love, which was a top ten single in Australia. Kreuger also co-wrote the second #1 hit, "If I Let You Go", by Westlife.

== Eurovision Song Contest national finals entries ==
Melodifestivalen entries (Sweden)

Year	Artist	Title	Co-written with	Result
2012	Youngblood	"Youngblood"	Fredrik Kempe	Second Chance
2014	Alcazar	"Blame It on the Disco"	Fredrik Kempe, Hamed "K-One" Pirouzpanah	3rd
2014	Oscar Zia	"Yes We Can"	Fredrik Kempe, Hamed "K-One" Pirouzpanah	8th
2014	Sanna Nielsen	"Undo"	Fredrik Kempe, Hamed "K-One" Pirouzpanah	1st
2015	Eric Saade	"Sting"	Arash Fahmi, Fredrik Kempe, Hamed "K-One" Pirouzpanah	5th
2015	Kristin Amparo	"I See You"	Kristin Amparo, Fredrik Kempe	Second Chance
2016	Samir & Viktor	"Bada nakna"	Fredrik Kempe, Anderz Wrethov	12th
2017	Robin Bengtsson	"I Can't Go On"	Hamed "K-One" Pirouzpanah, Robin Stjernberg	1st
2018	Jessica Andersson	"Party Voice"	Fredrik Kempe, Niklas Carson Mattsson, Jessica Andersson	11th
2019	Jon Henrik Fjällgren	"Norrsken (Goeksegh)"	Fredrik Kempe, Niklas Carson Mattsson, Jon Henrik Fjällgren	4th
2020	William Stridh	"Molnljus"	Markus Lidén, Christian Holmström, William Stridh	5th (Semi-final)
2021	Jessica Andersson	"Horizon"	Fredrik Kempe, Marcus Lidén, Christian Holmström	5th (Semi-final)
2021	Klara Hammarström	"Beat of Broken Hearts"	Fredrik Kempe, Niklas Carson Mattson, Andreas Wijk	6th
2024	Samir & Viktor	"Hela världen väntar"	Fredrik Kempe, Niklas Carson Mattson	4th (Heat)

Krajowe Eliminacje entries (Poland)

Year	Artist	Title	Co-written with	Result
2017	Isabell Otrębus	"Voiceless"	Fredrik Kempe	4th
