= MXM and Wolf Cousins =

Two Swedish songwriting and production organizations

- Type: Recording studio
- Industry: Music
- Founded: 1992
- Headquarters: Stockholm, Sweden/New York City, US (MXM Music); Los Angeles, US (Wolf Cousins Music)

MXM and Wolf Cousins are a pair of Swedish songwriting and production organisations, founded and established by songwriter and record producer Max Martin. MXM Studios and its affiliated producers are based in New York City, and Wolf Cousins Music in Los Angeles. Both MXM and Wolf Cousins are headquartered in Stockholm, Sweden, where their works originate, as they both derive from the works of Maratone Studios and Cheiron Studios.

These studios have formed a music collective around many of Max Martin's affiliates. The MXM team consists of Martin himself; Rami Yacoub; Savan Kotecha; Carolina Liar members Johan Carlsson, Peter Carlsson and Rickard Goransson; Cardigans guitarist Peter Svensson; and Elvira Anderfjard. This also included Dr. Luke up until 2014.

== History ==
=== Denniz PoP and Cheiron beginnings ===
The origins of Cheiron Studios trace back to Swedish record producer and disc jockey Denniz PoP. In 1986, Pop and a group of local producers formed the remix collective Remixed Records, releasing underground reworks of popular songs. Their growing recognition in Europe attracted nightclub owner Tom Talomaa, who supported the team’s transition to professional production. As their work expanded, the collective split into two divisions: Basement Division for underground projects and SweMix Records for commercial releases and new artists.

By 1990, SweMix Records had begun to sign several artists, including Kayo, Leila K, The Cool Runnings, Dayeene and Dr. Alban, the latter of which granted Denniz Pop his first chart entry as a producer with "Hello Afrika", peaking at number 7 in the Swedish Singles Chart. The song was later made part of Dr. Alban's debut album Hello Afrika, which was entirely produced by Pop. In 1991, Remixed Records was sold and made into an official label, signing artists like Solid Base and Sonic Dream Collective. Furthermore, SweMix was split in two: SweMix Productions and SweMix Record & Publishing. SweMix Productions most notably went on to sign on Swedish DJ StoneBridge, who shortly garnered attention with his remix of "Show Me Love" by Robin S.. SweMix Records & Publishing was eventually sold to Bertelsmann Music Group and became SweMix's parent label. As a result, Denniz Pop and Tom Talomaa took over as chairman and creative directors and renamed it Cheiron and began working in the studio.

In 1992, when Cheiron was established, Denniz Pop had parted ways with the SweMix collective due to creative differences, wanting to concentrate solely on the operations behind Cheiron. During that time, Pop received a demo from Danish company Mega Records of a song recorded by then-unknown band Ace of Base. He was not initially impressed by the demo but after repeated listens decided to transform it into a reggae song. The song was eventually recorded at the SweMix Studio and was given the title "All That She Wants," becoming an unexpected hit for both parties. Later that year, record producer Douglas Carr was employed at Cheiron Studios to help carry Denniz's initial sound and mix it with other genres.

By 1993, Denniz's idea of publishing and promoting records went downhill and decided to concentrate solely on writing and producing music. He was pursuing a more dance-heavy sound when Tom Talomaa recognized the work of glam metal band It's Alive, whose frontman and founder was renowned record producer and songwriter Max Martin (known by his former stage name Martin White). The band was eventually signed to Cheiron and Denniz served as the creative director for the band's second album Earthquake Visions. The album fell short of commercial expectations. In spite of this, Denniz took Max under his wing, encouraging him to continue writing songs. He also gave him the name Max Martin in place of his previous stage name. After joining, Max stated that it took him around two years to get used to his new occupation.

=== Mid-'90s success ===
Cheiron Studios and its members were in high demand in 1994 and the requests for Denniz PoP's expertise and services had experienced an increase from people worldwide as more new artists wanted to work with him. To handle the offers, he wanted to hire more people to work with him and the interested parties at the studio. Alongside Max Martin, who, at the time, was experimenting in music production with him, Denniz hired Kristian Lundin and John Amatiello, who together produced music under the moniker Amadin, as songwriters and producers, given that they were signed to Dr. Alban's label Dr. Records and have had songs released through Cheiron beforehand. Two people that eventually became close affiliates with working at the studio were David Kreuger and Per Magnusson, who gave a hand at working closely with upcoming artists. As well as hiring new people, Cheiron also began working with Zomba Label Group, owned by BMG, to expand their clientele and reach out to international artists.

Within the year, Denniz and Max produced their first song together, entitled "Pumping (To The Rhythm)" and was released through Cheiron under the moniker Draxx, which combined both of their stage names to make one name. This is considered to be one of Max's first credited appearances in music. Both Lundin and Amatiello joined Denniz to produce Dr. Alban's third album Look Who's Talking!, which attained a gold certification in Sweden. Denniz also set up a meeting with Swedish musician E-Type, where he and the entire Cheiron team agreed to produce his debut album Made in Sweden, including the hit singles "Set the World on Fire" and "This Is the Way", the latter of which became Max's first chart entry, peaking at number 1.

In 1995, Herbie Crichlow, who had already been writing with the team a couple years prior, began writing material with Denniz and Max for his debut album Fingers, which included the songs "Right Type of Mood", "Big Funky Dealer" and "I Believe". The basis of the album formed a working partnership between Herbie and the Cheiron team in the years to come. They also produced the song "Wish You Were Here" by Rednex, which reached number 1 in several countries around Europe and, therefore, became Max's first certified hit as a producer. Around the beginning of the year, Zomba welcomed then-unknown boy band Backstreet Boys and flew them to Sweden to record material at the studio. Three songs were recorded, one of these being their debut single "We've Got It Goin' On", produced by Denniz and Max. The song was widely successful on European charts, peaking in the top 5 in several countries, but did not find the same success in the United States, peaking at number 69.

Alongside the artists mentioned, Denniz was reunited with Ace of Base to record and produce material alongside Max for their third album The Bridge and with singer-songwriter Robyn on her song "Do You Know (What It Takes)". Denniz continued to work with prominent artists, including Michael Jackson on 3T's song "I Need You" with Jackson providing featured vocals. In 1996, Cheiron helped record album material for Papa Dee and E-Type and a few songs from Leila K's third album Manic Panic, including the hit single "Electric". Most successfully, Max and Lundin produced "Quit Playing Games (With My Heart)" by Backstreet Boys, which kickstarted the boy band's success in the United States. Additionally, Denniz and Max produced NSYNC's debut single "I Want You Back", which was a hit for the act. In 1997, songwriter Andreas Carlsson was hired to the team and began working with them on Denise Lopez's second album I Do.

=== Max, Rami, and Maratone Studios ===
In November 1997, Denniz PoP revealed that he had been diagnosed with stomach cancer. At the time, he was working with Max Martin and Kristian Lundin on material for Five, as well as his then-girlfriend Jessica Folcker's self-titled debut album, who previously appeared as a backing vocalist in previously released Cheiron songs for Ace of Base, Dr. Alban and Leila K. In the turn of the year, Max began to take creative control of most of the records being produced in Denniz's absence. However, while in the hospital, Max would frequently visit him to get feedback on the songs he was working on. When released, Jessica's album became an instant Swedish hit with the singles "Tell Me That You Like" and "How Will I Know (Who You Are)" and gained Folcker a nomination for Best Newcomer and Best Female Artist at the Grammis. Furthermore, Denniz and Max received a "Special Grammis Award" and "Special Honor Award" for restoring the world popularity of Swedish pop music and making Sweden the third largest music exporting country in the world. Denniz however, could not attend the ceremony due to his illness. Denniz PoP died of cancer in August 1998, aged 35, with many recognizing his contributions posthumously. In an interview, Lundin opened up about his struggles in and out of the studio since Denniz's passing, "...it's been difficult for all of us to get any work done here. It's taking us a lot longer than usual." In the wake of his death, Max took over as director of Cheiron Studios, alongside Tom Talomaa.

During the time that Denniz was absent from Cheiron, Max began getting closely affiliated with record producer Rami Yacoub, who was already known for his work with Lutricia McNeal, and was hired just before Denniz's death. Rami cited him as his music industry "godfather" and mentor throughout his career and stated that it was an honor to finally get to work with Max and his creative partners at Cheiron. Rami began working directly on numerous projects, beginning with Solid HarmoniE's single edit of "To Love Once Again" and also producing "...Baby One More Time" with Max, which kickstarted the career of Britney Spears. Some of the sessions with Britney in particular were done in collaboration with Denniz, recording a number of six songs for her debut album ...Baby One More Time, but none of them made the final cut. The song became the most successful song in Max's career and in Cheiron history and peaked at number 1 in every country it charted in, which made it one of the best-selling singles of all time, as well as making Rolling Stone's list of the 100 greatest singles of all time.

In 1999, they contributed to four other tracks from Britney's album, including the equally successful singles "(You Drive Me) Crazy" and "Born to Make You Happy", and worked on album material for Gary Barlow and Westlife. Max, Lundin and Andreas Carlsson also took part in Backstreet Boys' hit single "I Want It That Way", which became a staple of the band's discography, and Celine Dion's hit "That's the Way It Is", which sonically took to a different direction than most of her other hit songs over the century which labelled it as "more up-tempo". In the turn of the century, Max and Rami recorded and produced more material for Britney's second album Oops!... I Did It Again, spawning hits like "Stronger", "Lucky" and its title track, which was made the lead single. Cheiron's final projects covered artists like Jessica Folcker, Westlife and Backstreet Boys until Max and Tom Talomaa decided that the studio should close its doors. In August 2000, they announced on the studio's website, "Cheiron was created with the intention of having fun, making a few hits and not getting too serious about it. We feel the 'hype' of Cheiron has become bigger than [the studio] itself and it's time to quit while we're ahead."

In the studio's last few months of life before its closure, the decision was made to form a brand new production company called Maratone Studios, where Max, Talomaa and Rami were to reside. Lundin left the company prior to its departure and formed his own studio The Location, with his new production partner Jake Schulze and where Andreas Carlsson would work on further music. Kreuger and Magnusson started a third studio, A Side Productions, and continued their collaborations with Jörgen Elofsson. The Maratone team eventually leased the Cheiron building to Roxy Recordings, whose roster included Anders Hansson, who replaced Max as lead vocalist of his former band It's Alive, and moved in to Cosmos Studios, on the outskirts of Stockholm, Sweden, in January 2001.

When Maratone Studios was established in February 2001, Max and Rami began to record material for Britney's self-titled third album, where they had the opportunity to write songs with Dido. Max's wife, Jenny Petersson, had also recently given birth to their daughter. Not long after Britney's album released, Maratone experienced a slump in recording and producing demand, but still remained moderately active, working with Nick Carter, Celine Dion and Lambretta. Max explained how hard it was to try and create music that he was used to producing in a world where music was always evolving and, as a result, did struggle for the first couple years Maratone came into existence. He said, "The world moved on, which it should. That's what popular culture is about. But I didn't. I stayed in my Cheiron bubble. I had that epiphany where maybe I needed to start listening to new music and figure it out. So that's what I did."

=== Working with Dr. Luke ===
In the beginning of 2004, Max Martin started to get acquainted with recording engineer Michael Ilbert, who is responsible for contributing to some of Max's future records, and introduced him to new artists that he hoped would help inspire him for more musical projects. Max eventually moved to New York City for a short while to help him find more inspiration and also began to learn how to play guitar. He then met record producer Dr. Luke, who was deejaying at a house party at the time, and gave Max a tour of New York clubs. They both began to work on material together back in Maratone Studios, writing for the likes of Pink and Hilary Duff, when they were approached by Kelly Clarkson and her team. She flew over to the studio in Stockholm to meet them both and recorded "Since U Been Gone". The song managed to peak at the top 5 in United States and was cited as a breakthrough for a song of its type, especially considering its heavy rock influences.

The following year, the Maratone team collaborated on projects with Backstreet Boys and Marion Raven. In the latter half of the year, they also launched the career of The Veronicas with their hit debut single "4ever" and its follow-up "Everything I'm Not". In June 2005, Max had signed an exclusive worldwide deal with Kobalt Music Group that would handle copyright administration for Max and the rest of the producers working under Maratone studios, which included any works from 2005 and onwards. In 2006, the team worked on material for Pink's fourth album I'm Not Dead, which sonically followed in the footsteps of Clarkson's recent hits. Shortly after, Maratone welcomed Icelandic producer Arnthor Birgisson, who was known for his work with Bloodshy and working with artists, including Ultra Nate and Janet Jackson. Upon joining, Arnthor became closely affiliated with Rami Yacoub, with their first collaboration being the song "Mistake" by Stephanie McIntosh.

In 2007, Savan was working with Shayne Ward and was recruited to write material for his second album Breathless. He was assisted by Rami and Arnthor to produce and record the songs made and ended up writing almost every song on the album. The three also worked with Westlife during that time. Dr. Luke also began producing and writing without Max on records for Avril Lavigne and Sugababes. His sessions with Lavigne gave him his first Billboard number 1 as a solo producer with the hit single "Girlfriend". Meanwhile, Max worked on songs with James Blunt, Apocalyptica and old affiliate E-Type to moderate success. In the turn of the year, Rami announced that he was breaking away from Maratone Studios and was going on an indefinite hiatus from studio work to focus on himself. He said, "I know, it's a long pause. We were so close, but after ten years we became like an old couple. I was supposed to take one year off, but it became five."

=== Maratone's evolution and success in teen pop ===
Maratone Studios had their most successful year on record in the late 2000s. In March 2008, Max Martin formed and signed a seven-piece alternative rock band called Carolina Liar, which was fronted by Chad Wolf. He also executively produced their debut album Coming to Terms. A couple years previous and in the wake of Rami Yacoub's departure, Max also met then-16-year-old Shellback through a mutual friend, who was working in the death metal scene and was not interested in mainstream pop music whatsoever. However, Max invited Shellback to record demos with him and was eventually made a member of the Maratone team in 2007. However, their first production contributions as a pair weren't made until 2008, when producing material for the likes of Pink and Britney Spears. They also began working with Sophia Somajo during that time, who commented about the first time she encountered Shellback. "He was so young and brilliant and could play every instrument, and he talked non-stop. I was like, 'Is this some kind of savant wunderkind that Martin's found somewhere?'", she said. The biggest success of the year ended up being with Katy Perry with her debut single "I Kissed a Girl". Worked on by Max and Dr. Luke, the song became Maratone's biggest achievement and Max's biggest hit single since Britney's "...Baby One More Time", released ten years previous. The song in later years has also been praised as the beginning of LGBT awareness in music.

In 2009, Max worked with a variety of artists, including Adam Lambert, Carrie Underwood and even reunited with Kelly Clarkson, after the success of "Since U Been Gone". This was just before claims had begun to surface about Clarkson having bad experiences with Dr. Luke and how she did not want to be associated with him on future projects. Despite the decision, "My Life Would Suck Without You" still charted and went straight to number 1 in the Billboard Hot 100. The team also took part in producing material for Leona Lewis's second album Echo, which ended up being the last sessions that Arnthor Birgisson had done with Maratone Studios before he departed to focus on his own production company Aristotracks. He also met singer-songwriter Ina Wroldsen within the year and both got together to form the duo Ask Embla.

During the year, Dr. Luke experienced his breakthrough year as a solo producer away from working with Maratone and was specifically affiliated with Benny Blanco. He also worked very closely with singer-songwriter Kesha six years beforehand on album material and, once signed to RCA Records, began to expose her to mainstream attention with her featured appearances on songs with Flo Rida, Pitbull and Taio Cruz and her debut hit single "Tik Tok". Luke also contributed to the song "Party in the U.S.A." by Miley Cyrus. Co-written by Jessie J, the song became her highest-charting song, kickstarting Miley's professional music career.

In the turn of the decade, Kesha released her debut album Animal, which alongside Dr. Luke, also featured contributions from Max and Shellback. The album itself marked a significant milestone in the direction of Maratone's production style from pop rock to dance pop and electropop and, in some cases, a combination of the two. This was solidified when they worked with Usher on the song "DJ Got Us Fallin' in Love", which became one of the team's first recordings that was influenced predominantly around club music. Max and Dr. Luke had a hand in working with Katy Perry on her second album Teenage Dream, after the success of her debut One of the Boys, with Katy referring to the experience as "a wonderful collaborative effort", despite public concerns of Dr. Luke's work ethic with other artists. Max and Shellback also worked with Pink on the songs "Raise Your Glass" and "Fuckin' Perfect", which became instant hits. The pair follow a strong pop style, which was reminiscent in other releases contributed by the Maratone team. During the time that Shellback spent with Max, he also began to develop working partnerships with Benny Blanco and Kristian Lundin. Shellback even worked with Blanco on Maroon 5's song "Moves like Jagger", alongside Christina Aguilera, which was his first song he produced without Max and became an instant hit, topping the charts in over 18 countries. The song was also certified Diamond by the Recording Industry Association of America in 2021.

In 2011, Max and Shellback worked with numerous artists, including Britney Spears, Cher Lloyd and Avril Lavigne. They also produced two original songs for the cast of renowned TV series Glee. Adam Anders, who executive produced the songs recorded for show, hired Max after being exposed to how popular Glee was, whilst working on Spears' seventh album Femme Fatale. Anders said, "[Max Martin] owns radio right now. He's had, like, seven No. 1s in the last year, and so if we wanna go to radio with anybody tagging along, I think he's the guy you want. We've done like 30 of his songs on Glee." Maratone signees Carolina Liar also worked on their follow-up album with Shellback, prior to being dropped by Atlantic Records, which performed disappointingly after their debut. The instrumentalists of the group, Johan Carlsson, Peter Carlsson and Rickard Goransson were hired by Max after the album's release to write and produce music under Maratone. Meanwhile, Savan Kotecha reunited with Rami Yacoub after the founding of Rami's Kinglet Studios, which he ran alongside Carl Falk. The site of the studio used to be the site of A Side Studios, run by David Kreuger and Per Magnusson, before it was shut down.

=== Establishing MXM/Wolf Cousins ===
In the late months of 2011, Max Martin got acquainted with one of Shellback's old friends Julius Petersson, who is a consultant and A&R executive for Warner Chappell Music. He expressed a mutual interest in expanding Maratone Studios and its team of producers and wanted to help Max find more people to hire and work with long term. He offered him a publishing deal with the label, which lead to the decision to rebrand Maratone as MXM Music & Productions at the start of 2012. From that point, the team began to grow exponentially. In the early months of 2012, Peter Svensson was signed to Kobalt Music Group and, shortly after, was hired by Max after working together previously for Carolina Liar. They both wrote together for Vicci Martinez's self-titled album and, later on, contributed to One Direction's second album Take Me Home with Savan Kotecha. Shellback was also introduced to the work of Oscar Holter when recording the song "Let There Be Love" by Christina Aguilera, who was being mentored by Swedish record producer T.I. Jakke. This was also when he met recently signed production duo The Struts, composed of Jakob Jerlstrom and Ludvig Soderberg, when they started working with long-time MXM affiliate Alexander Kronlund. With all artists sharing a publishing deal with Sony Bertelsmann Music Group in common, Julius Petersson followed their work and slowly started working with Shellback during their spare time.

During the same year, Katy Perry released her two hit singles "Part of Me" and Wide Awake", which were worked on with Max and Dr. Luke during the 2010 Teenage Dream sessions, and later both contributed to Kesha's second album Warrior. Max also collaborated with DJ and producer Zedd on the song "Beauty and a Beat" by Justin Bieber, which was originally going to be a part of Zedd's debut album Clarity. He stated that it did not fit the album's style, so he, Max and Savan Kotecha re-wrote the song and gave it to Justin. Not long after, Max and Shellback worked with Taylor Swift on the songs "We Are Never Ever Getting Back Together", "I Knew You Were Trouble" and "22", after her label persuaded Swift to have a few "pop-oriented" songs on her fourth album Red.

In 2013, Carolina Liar's Rickard Goransson began working with numerous artists, such as Zara Larsson and Fifth Harmony. The MXM collective as a whole also worked on material for the band Emblem3. In the later half of the year, The Struts began working with singer-songwriter Tove Lo, after being recruited and signed to Warner Chappell by Julius Petersson. For her first project, they were both introduced to fellow Swedish production duo Mattman & Robin, who were being mentored by producer Jason Gill, and began working frequently with Julius' team of newly hired producers. Shellback also got acquainted with two producers Ilya Salmanzadeh and OzGo from production trio Crossfade, alongside Ferari Zand, and worked with him frequently on new material – their first being with Cher Lloyd on her song "I Wish". Additionally, in the early months of the year, the Denniz Pop Awards were founded and established by former members, co-workers, friends and family of the late Cheiron Studios with the goal of helping new songwriters, producers, and artists continue the legacy Denniz Pop once started. Max Martin was automatically made a member of the jury, alongside Jorgen Elofsson, Per Magnusson and John Amatiello. Max's daughter Doris "Daga" Sandberg is also among those who decide the winners.

Max and Dr. Luke contributed to the majority of Katy's fourth album Prism, with the sessions with Dr. Luke being in California, United States and the ones with Max in Stockholm, Sweden. When the album was released in late 2013, two of its singles "Roar" and "Dark Horse" experienced a horrific amount of plagiarism and copyright infringement allegations, which carried on into the following year and sparked the beginning of Dr. Luke's downfall. Furthermore, after Dr. Luke contributed to Kesha's hit collaboration with Pitbull "Timber", he was accused of stunting Kesha's growth as an artist and, in the new year, she was admitted to rehab for bulimia nervosa, something which was said to have been imposed on Kesha by Dr. Luke.

On 5 November 2013, Max and Shellback established a production team called Wolf Cousins, which was described to be a place where new talents could be mentored, connected and work with members under MXM Music. Shellback and Julius Petersson became the company's chairmen and Oscar Holter, The Struts, Mattman & Robin, Ilya Salmanzadeh and OzGo all signed a joint publishing deal with Warner Chappell that would, therefore, make them members of Wolf Cousins. Upon founding the team, Petersson met DJ and producer Ali Payami, who became the last person to be recruited to the Wolf Cousins team.

=== Success in adult pop ===
Going into 2014, it was revealed that MXM Music had already begun working alongside top artists, putting the team on track for one of their biggest years to date. One of the first songs that marked this milestone was "Problem" by Ariana Grande. Max Martin and Shellback originally contributed to the song, with additional help from Ilya Salmanzadeh, who started working directly with Max throughout Ariana's music career. The team also worked on the songs "Break Free", being the team's second collaboration with Zedd, "Bang Bang", a collaboration with Jessie J and Nicki Minaj an became the third largest sales debut so far that year, "Love Me Harder", which became Ali Payami first breakout recording with MXM Music, and "One Last Time", worked on by Ilya Salmanzadeh and Savan Kotecha. All of these songs ended up making Ariana's second studio album My Everything. Max and Shellback also worked with Taylor Swift on 12 tracks for her fifth studio album 1989, marketed as the musician's "first documented, official pop album". As well as Max and Shellback, the album also delivered additional contributions from Wolf Cousins producers Mattman & Robin and Payami. After the success of her previous album, her management wanted to ensure a smooth transition to pop and, since working with them previously, Max and Shellback were hired to produce more material with her. Swift described them both as "absolute dream collaborators", due to pushing her ideas to a different direction, which in turn challenged her as a songwriter.

In late 2014, Wolf Cousins team contributed to the majority of Tove Lo's debut album Queen of the Clouds. She skyrocketed into the music scene when her single "Habits (Stay High)", recorded by The Struts, was remixed by Hippie Sabotage within the early months of the year, which got the song charting in countries that original did not, including the United Kingdom and Sweden. Shellback produced the single "Talking Body", alongside the Struts, which became a hit in both United Kingdom and United States.

In early 2015, Savan Kotecha contributed to Madonna's thirteenth album Rebel Heart from sessions with Rami Yacoub and Avicii. The team collaborated heavily on album material for artists, such as Demi Lovato, Ellie Goulding and Tori Kelly, and executive produced Adam Lambert's third album The Original High. Mattman & Robin got acquainted with Justin Tranter, after he signed to Warner Chappell Music, who later met Julia Michaels, and all started writing music together for the likes of Selena Gomez and Hailee Steinfeld. After the success of Ariana and The Weeknd's collaboration the previous year, Max and Payami started working regularly for the latter and contributed to the hit single "Can't Feel My Face", which became The Weeknd's most successful release so far, alongside two other songs for his second album Beauty Behind the Madness. Oscar Holter began to get affiliated with more Wolf Cousins producers through Shellback and, when Ilya started working with Max, got together with OzGo, producing songs for DNCE, and Mattman & Robin on Carly Rae Jepsen's "Run Away with Me" and Hailee Steinfeld's "Love Myself". In the later months of 2015, Max and Shellback contributed to Adele's song "Send My Love (To Your New Lover)", after Adele expressed interest in working with them when overhearing their work with Taylor Swift. They worked on the record that Adele said was a song she wrote when she was 13 years old.

The following year saw album material recorded for the likes of Sabina Ddumba, Britney Spears and The Weeknd. In the early months of 2016, Max Martin served as executive producer for Ariana Grande's third album Dangerous Woman and recorded the backbone of the project with Ilya Salmanzadeh. Its title track and lead single was worked on by Max, alongside Johan Carlsson. However, before given to Ariana, the song was pitched to many other artists, including Rihanna and Alicia Keys. Johan Carlsson got hugely affiliated with Meghan Trainor whilst recording her second album Thank You and wrote together for other artists, such as Jason Derulo, Michael Buble and Little Mix. The Wolf Cousins team contributed to the majority of DNCE's self-titled debut album and Tove Lo's second album Lady Wood. Tove's album spawned moderately successful hits, including its hit single "Cool Girl" and "True Disaster", which was the first published song produced and recorded entirely by Oscar Holter. Towards the middle of the year, Max and Shellback were recruited by Justin Timberlake to record material for the soundtrack of the 2016 film Trolls, with one of these songs being the hit single "Can't Stop the Feeling!". Upon release, it became Timberlake's biggest best-selling song of 2016.

In 2017, MXM Music worked on comeback albums for Pink, Katy Perry and Taylor Swift, all of which peaked at number 1 on Billboard Hot 100. Mattman & Robin and Justin Tranter worked on numerous projects, including Imagine Dragons on their breakthrough single "Believer", which became the band's first top 5 hit in the United States since their 2013 single "Radioactive", and on Julia Michaels' major-label debut extended play Nervous System. OzGo began to get acquainted with songwriter James Alan Ghaleb, who previously worked with Ilya on material for DNCE, and began writing together for the likes of The Script and Maroon 5. Additionally, both members of The Struts started to work with other artists independently, with Ludvig Soderberg going by the moniker "A Strut". More specifically, Soderberg started frequently working with production duo Jack & Coke, after producing alongside each other for Tove Lo's third album Blue Lips, and also worked with artists Dagny and PrettyMuch. Going into 2018, MXM and Wolf Cousins worked with various new artists, as well as affiliates. OzGo and Oscar Holter worked on material with Troye Sivan and Leland for a week, one of the songs being "My My My!". During that time, both producers also met Allie X, who together worked on music for Troye and also The Vamps. Max Martin and Ilya Salmanzadeh contributed to Ariana's fourth album Sweetener, including its lead single "No Tears Left to Cry", which was made in response to a concert she held at the night and location of the Manchester Arena bombing. Ariana said that she hoped it would bring light and comfort to everyone the song touched and encouraged people to dance and "live ya best life!". Johan Carlsson also got affiliated with Charlie Puth when working on his second album Voicenotes and went on to produce further material in the year for Macy Gray, Michael Buble and Sabrina Carpenter.

=== Oscar Holter affiliation, Elvira and Rami's return ===
After working with 5 Seconds of Summer on their third album Youngblood in 2017 and going into 2018, Rami Yacoub took a break from music to focus more on family and looking after his son and expressed to Max Martin the interest of wanting to come back to MXM and Wolf Cousins Studios. He said, "I took time off with my wife and to look after my son. But then I felt I wanted to come back to the family and Max is like 'the door is always open'. They had a great group of people, 95% of whom are Swedish, so it felt like home!" As a result, Rami and Carl Falk decided to shut down operations and productions at Kinglet Studios in 2018, after running for almost ten years, and both went their separate ways. Rami started getting familiar at working with Wolf Cousins and made his first contributions with the team in 2019, writing the song "Don't Worry Bout Me" by Zara Larsson, in sessions with Tove Lo and The Struts. He also participated in the soundtrack of the 2019 film Charlie's Angels, which was executively produced by Ariana Grande and the MXM/Wolf Cousins team.

In 2019, Max contributed to album material for Ariana Grande and Pink. Max wrote and produced the lead single from the Charlie's Angels soundtrack "Don't Call Me Angel" by Ariana, Miley Cyrus and Lana Del Rey, which was described as "lukewarm" and "less potent" when compared to that of Destiny's Child's own Charlie's Angels theme. Max and Shellback worked with Ed Sheeran for the first time amongst other artists on his collaborative album No.6 Collaborations Project. Ilya Salmanzadeh started working alongside Labrinth on material for his second album Imagination & the Misfit Kid and alongside Sam Smith on his pop-infused song "How Do You Sleep?". Describing his change in direction musically from ballads to pop, Smith elaborated "I feel like I have recently shown a side of me which I normally keep to myself or for my family and friends. I showed everyone it and everyone loved it. It's almost given me permission to kinda' do what I've always dreamed of doing but I was always scared to do, which is pop music." Johan Carlsson contributed to Avril Lavigne's sixth album Head Above Water and also worked further, alongside Charlie Puth, on Katy Perry's songs "Small Talk" and "Harleys in Hawaii". OzGo contributed to Marina's fourth album Love + Fear and began working on album material with Allie X. British band Coldplay got introduced to Max and his team when they worked together on two songs for the band's eighth album Everyday Life and also started working exclusively alongside Oscar Holter for the first time on The Weeknd's hit single "Blinding Lights"., which went on to become to longest charting song on Billboard Hot 100 of all time.

In the turn of the decade, then-upcoming songwriter and musician Elvira Anderfjard graduated from the Songwriters Academy of Sweden at Musikmakarna and got signed directly to MXM Music to work with Max Martin. She started working with Tove Lo on material for her Paw Prints edition of her fourth album Sunshine Kitty, including the single "Sadder Badder Cooler", written alongside Max. Within the year, Max and Holter worked on four other songs for The Weeknd's fourth album After Hours. Max also contributed to two songs for the soundtrack to the film Trolls World Tour, which was also executive produced by Justin Timberlake. Savan Kotecha was made executive producer of the soundtrack to the film Eurovision Song Contest: The Story of Fire Saga, which included contributions from Rami, Johan Carlsson, Rickard Goransson and even reunited the team with old Maratone Studios member Arnthor Birgisson. Rami Yacoub saw his biggest credit since working with One Direction, which was writing six songs for Lady Gaga's comeback album Chromatica. This included all three of its collaborations. The song "Rain on Me", done in collaboration with Ariana Grande, was the first female-collaborative recording to debut at number 1 on the Billboard Hot 100, as well as being the first female duet in history to win a Grammy at the 63rd Annual Grammy Awards. Johan Carlsson contributed to the bulkhead of Katy Perry's sixth album Smile, as well as Oscar Holter, OzGo and Elvira handing their assistance on a few other tracks. In the later half of the year, the team contributed to three singles from Sam Smith third album Love Goes, being "I'm Ready", "My Oasis" and "Diamonds". Both "I'm Ready" and "How Do You Sleep?" were intended to be on the album's original track list, then titled To Die For, to be released in May 2020, before it got pushed back and renamed.

In 2021, Max Martin, with Oscar Holter, produced the entirety of Coldplay's ninth album Music of the Spheres and became Max's first album to do so. This included the hit single "My Universe", done alongside Korean boy band BTS, which became the first recording by two co-billed lead groups to top the charts and the first song by a British group to debut at number 1 in United States history. Holter and Mattman & Robin wrote and produced the song "Good Ones" by Charli XCX and, later on, she also teased a song called "Sweat" that she had recorded and co-wrote with Rami Yacoub as part of the soundtrack for her featured Pandora ME campaign. Rami also began working frequently with Ilya Salmanzadeh for artists, such as Justin Bieber and Westlife. Max and Ilya also teamed up with the Jonas Brothers, with additional assistance from Rami Yacoub, to record and produce the song "Who's In Your Head" for their upcoming tour and became Rami's first new song to be credited alongside Max since he departed from Maratone Studios 14 years previous. When Taylor Swift began to release new versions of her albums, Max, Shellback and Elvira Anderfjard were credited as writers on new material and producers on both new and re-worked material on her re-recorded album Red (Taylor's Version). Specifically, the song "Message in a Bottle" was revealed as the first song she ever wrote in sessions with Max and Shellback back in 2012. In the later months of the year, Rami made two songs with Swedish DJ and record producer Alesso called "Somebody to Use" and "When I'm Gone", in collaboration with Katy Perry. Alesso said about the collaborative record, "I feel like a song like this hasn't been made in a while. The world needs a fun energetic dance record again. We worked on this song for more than a year and are so pleased with how it came out."

=== #StemDrop ===
At the start of 2022, The Weeknd's released his fifth studio album Dawn FM, which was worked on by Max Martin and Oscar Holter, in collaboration with Oneohtrix Point Never. The album was described by the artist as "the album I always wanted to make". Rami contributed to Bastille's fourth album Give Me the Future and later with singer-songwriter Anitta on her album Versions of Me. Rami and Ilya Salmanzadeh also co-wrote a song on Charli XCX's fifth album Crash, which eventually included her previously released song "Good Ones", and the album became her highest-charting album in her music career, reaching number 1 in the Official UK Charts and debuting in the top 10 on Billboard Hot 100. In May 2022, Italian band Måneskin, who won the Eurovision Song Contest of 2021, revealed that they had been working on their upcoming debut international album with the MXM and Wolf Cousins team extensively after meeting Max Martin in Los Angeles the previous year. The band's single "Supermodel", which was worked on with Max and Rami Yacoub, was premiered on the live final of Eurovision Song Contest 2022. Justin Tranter, who wrote the song alongside the band said that it was to be the "first of many" they had written together also. The band also teased another song, which is aimed to be on the album called "Gasoline", in support of the Russian Invasion of Ukraine, also made by the team. Additionally, Ali Payami, who took a three-year break from working on music, returned with the focus of independently expanding his clientele and trying to develop a signature sound, away from MXM and Wolf Cousins. This became official after working with Sorana on her second solo single "Karaoke" and later contributed to Fletcher's debut album Girl of My Dreams.

In the latter half of the year, MXM and Wolf Cousins contributed to three songs off of Lizzo's album Special, including its promotional single "Grrrls", and, later, its second single "2 Be Loved (Am I Ready)". Additionally, the year saw the return of collaborative efforts between Ilya and OzGo for nearly eight years on Mabel's album About Last Night.... Wolf Cousins also contributed to multiple songs on Tove Lo's album Dirt Femme. In September 2022, Sam Smith released the single "Unholy", alongside Kim Petras, which was contributed by Ilya, and received a top position on the charts in nearly 20 countries worldwide. The song's explosive success was credited to the pair teasing the song on TikTok with a video of them dancing in the recording studio a little over a month before its release. British house duo Disclosure made a remix of the song and performed it live, posting their love for the song on social media as well. It was announced, simultaneously, that it is expected to appear on Smith's fourth album Gloria. Additionally, other notable contributions that took place by the collective include with acts, such as Beyoncé and Alma. Towards the end of the year, Max Martin partnered up with Simon Cowell of Syco Music, as well as record labels Universal Music Group and Republic Records, to create a talent-searching project for TikTok called "#StemDrop". Simon elaborated on the purpose of the project, "Imagine if some of the biggest songwriters in the world wrote a brand new song and, instead of giving it to a well-known artist, you gave it to the world to record?" The first song of the project called "Red Lights" was released on 26 October 2022 and was written by Max, as well as Savan Kotecha and Ali Payami.

Towards the start of 2023, Max Martin contributed to several songs on Maneskin's international debut album Rush!, including "Supermodel". British artist Lewis Capaldi stated that he had written extensively with the MXM and Wolf Cousins team, including Elvira Anderfjard and OzGo. The song "Leave Me Slowly", scheduled to be released on Capaldi's second album Broken by Desire to Be Heavenly Sent, was written by Martin and Oscar Holter. Furthermore, Elvira and OzGo had begun working frequently together on numerous projects for the likes of Maisie Peters and Alma. In March 2023, Max Martin announced that he, alongside Shellback and Fred Again, co-wrote Ed Sheeran's single "Eyes Closed", which was released as the lead cut from his 2023 album - (Subtract). Around the same time, Max shared a photo of him in the studio with Madonna, which sparked a lot of hype on social media.

== Personnel ==
=== Current members ===
==== MXM Music ====
- Max Martin (1994–present)
- Rami Yacoub (1997–2007; 2019–present)
- Savan Kotecha (2006–present)
- Shellback (2007–present)
- Johan Carlsson (2008–present)
- Peter Carlsson (2008–present)
- Rickard Goransson (2008–present)
- Tobias Karlsson (2008-present)
- Peter Svensson (2012–present)
- Elvira Anderfjärd (2020–present)
- Tove Burman (2020-present)
- Luka Kloser (2020-present)
- Carl Falk (2024-present)

==== Wolf Cousins ====
- Tove Lo (2012–present)
- Oscar Holter (2012–present)
- A Strut (2012–present)
- Mattias Larsson (2013–present)
- Robin Fredriksson (2013–present)
- Ilya (2013–present)
- OzGo (2013–present)
- Fat Max Gsus (2014-present)

=== Former members ===
- Denniz Pop (1992–1998)
- Douglas Carr (1992-1998)
- Kristian Lundin (1994–2000; 2012-2017)
- John Amatiello (1994-2000)
- Alexander Kronlund (1995-2000; 2012-2017)
- Jorgen Elofsson (1996-2000)
- David Kreuger (1996-2000)
- Per Magnusson (1996-2000)
- Jake Schulze (1998-2000)
- Andreas Carlsson (1998–2000)
- Per Aldeheim (1998-2008)
- Dr. Luke (2004–2014)
- Arnthor Birgisson (2006–2010)
- Lukas Loules (2012-2017)
- Laleh (2012-2017)
- Jakob Jerlstrom (2012-2023)
- Ali Payami (2013–2018)

== Affiliated artists ==
Together, Cheiron, Maratone and MXM and Wolf Cousins have worked with a vast number of musicians and artists, including:

- Dr. Alban
- Ace of Base
- E-Type
- Backstreet Boys
- Robyn
- Britney Spears
- Celine Dion
- Westlife
- Bon Jovi
- Kelly Clarkson
- Pink
- Shayne Ward
- Leona Lewis
- Avril Lavigne
- Danny Saucedo
- Katy Perry
- Lesley Roy
- Miley Cyrus
- Jessie J
- Adam Lambert
- Kesha
- Cher Lloyd
- One Direction
- Maroon 5
- Taylor Swift
- Emblem3
- Tove Lo
- Ariana Grande
- The Weeknd
- Carly Rae Jepsen
- Ellie Goulding
- DNCE
- Demi Lovato
- Selena Gomez
- Justin Timberlake
- Imagine Dragons
- 5 Seconds of Summer
- Skip Marley
- PrettyMuch
- Troye Sivan
- Charli XCX
- Sabrina Carpenter
- Julia Michaels
- Marina
- Ed Sheeran
- Sam Smith
- Allie X
- Labrinth
- Coldplay
- Bastille
- Måneskin
