= Don't Go Breaking My Heart (Sonic Dream Collective song) =

Single by Sonic Dream Collective

from the album Gravity
- B-side: "Take Me Back"
- Released: 1995
- Genre: Dance-pop; Eurodance; reggae fusion
- Length: 3:53
- Label: Remixed Records; Epic
- Songwriters: Linn Engström; Gibril Jobe
- Producers: Anders Wågberg; Stefan Warnberg

Sonic Dream Collective singles chronology
"Take Me Back" (1994)	"Don't Go Breaking My Heart" (1995)	"Oh, Baby All" (1995)

Music video
- "Don't Go Breaking My Heart" on YouTube

"Don't Go Breaking My Heart" is a song recorded by Swedish band Sonic Dream Collective, released in 1995 by Remixed Records and Epic as the second single from the band's debut album, Gravity (1995). Becoming a hit in clubs, it also reached number five on the US Billboard Hot Dance Breakouts Club Play Top 5 list in 1997. It is sung by lead vocalist Linn Engström, who also co-wrote the lyrics with Gibril Jobe, and produced by Anders Wågberg and Stefan Warnberg. The accompanying music video features the band performing in a club.

== Critical reception ==
Larry Flick from Billboard magazine wrote that the song "chugs with a synth-happy, reggae-spiced beat and a bit of throat-ravaging toasting by Gibril "Mr. Gee" Jobe." He added that "the focal point of the track, however, is singer Linn Engstrom, who has a reedy voice and an icy-cool delivery." Pan-European magazine Music & Media wrote about the album, "Here and there a heavy synth hookline refers to its Euro roots most prominently on the title track of SDC's debut album Gravity. It sneaks into the background on the current European single 'Don't Go Breaking My Heart', the Swedish single 'I Wonder Why' or the track 'I'm Alive'. These tracks feature the pop reggae element which typifies the Ace of Base sound."

== Polish version ==
Shortly after the release of the song "Don't Go Breaking My Heart", the Polish version of the song "Nie jestem zła" was created, performed by Magdalena Sokołowska, who used her name as a stage pseudonym in the 1990s. The singer created songs on the borderline of Eurodance and Polish dance music known as disco polo.

== Track listing ==
- 12" single, Sweden
1. "Don't Go Breaking My Heart" (Birch & Chris House Mix) — 5:31
2. "Don't Go Breaking My Heart" (JJ's Club Mix) — 17:38
3. "Don't Go Breaking My Heart" (JJ's Club Mix) — 27:58
- CD single, Sweden
1. "Don't Go Breaking My Heart" (Radio Version) — 3:53
2. "Take Me Back" (Radio Version) — 4:00
- CD maxi, Sweden
1. "Don't Go Breaking My Heart" (Radio Version) — 3:53
2. "Don't Go Breaking My Heart" (Club Mix) — 5:39
3. "Don't Go Breaking My Heart" (Birch & Chris Swing Mix) — 4:58
4. "Don't Go Breaking My Heart" (Solid Base Jungle Mix) — 4:23
