= Oh, Baby All =

1995 single by Sonic Dream Collective

Single by Sonic Dream Collective
- Released: 1995
- Genre: Pop
- Length: 3:48
- Label: Remixed
- Songwriter: Linn Engström
- Producers: Anders Wågberg; Jon Hällgren; Stefan Warnberg

Sonic Dream Collective singles chronology
"Don't Go Breaking My Heart" (1995)	"Oh, Baby All" (1995)	"I Wonder Why" (1996)

Music video
- "Oh, Baby All" on YouTube

"Oh, Baby All" is a song by Swedish band Sonic Dream Collective, released as the second single from their album, Gravity (1995). Written by lead vocalist Linn Engström, it was very successful on the singles chart in Sweden, peaking at number two, with a total of 12 weeks within the chart. But it topped the Swedish national radio P3 Tracks chart and was a radio hit in Scandinavia in the summer of '95. It also reached the singles charts in Germany and the UK, peaking at number 99 and 89. On the Eurochart Hot 100, it reached number 73 in September 1995. An accompanying music video, was made for the song, partly in black-and-white.

== Critical reception ==
British magazine Music Week gave "Oh, Baby All" three out of five. They wrote, "The debut UK single from this Swedish group who are very much in the mould of Ace of Base. Bright, breezy pop."

== Track listings ==
- 12-inch single, Europe
1. "Oh, Baby All" (Radio Version) – 3:48
2. "Oh, Baby All" (Solid Base Mix) – 5:06
3. "Oh, Baby All" (Optical 2 Mix) – 5:18
4. "Oh, Baby All" (Birch & Chris Mix) – 5:29
- CD single, Sweden
1. "Oh, Baby All" (Radio Version) – 3:48
2. "Oh, Baby All" (Birch & Chris Mix) – 5:29
- CD maxi, Germany
1. "Oh, Baby All" (Radio Version) – 3:48
2. "Oh, Baby All" (Extended Version) – 5:37
3. "Oh, Baby All" (Birch & Chris Mix) – 5:29
4. "Don't Go Breaking My Heart" (Birch & Chris House Mix) – 5:31
- CD maxi, UK
1. "Oh, Baby All" (Radio Version) – 3:48
2. "Oh, Baby All" (JJ's Radio Version) – 3:45
3. "Oh, Baby All" (Solid Base Mix) – 5:06
4. "Oh, Baby All" (Optical 2 Mix) – 5:18

== Charts ==
=== Weekly charts ===
Chart (1995–1996)	Peak position
Europe (Eurochart Hot 100 Singles)	73
Germany (GfK)	99
Scotland Singles (OCC)	98
Sweden (Sverigetopplistan)	2
UK Singles (OCC)	89

=== Year-end charts ===
Chart (1995)	Position
Sweden (Topplistan)	29
