= Actually Romantic =

2025 song by Taylor Swift

Song by Taylor Swift

from the album The Life of a Showgirl
- Released: October 3, 2025
- Studio: MXM; Shellback (Stockholm)
- Genre: Alternative rock; guitar pop; pop-punk; power pop
- Length: 2:43
- Label: Republic
- Songwriters: Taylor Swift; Max Martin; Shellback
- Producers: Taylor Swift; Max Martin; Shellback

Lyric video
- "Actually Romantic" on YouTube

"Actually Romantic" is a song by the American singer-songwriter Taylor Swift from her twelfth studio album, The Life of a Showgirl (2025). Swift wrote and produced the song with Max Martin and Shellback. An incorporation of alternative rock, guitar pop, pop-punk, and power pop, the track displays elements of 1990s slacker rock, with an arrangement characterized by a grunge electric guitar motif. In the lyrics, Swift's narrator expresses her amazement and enjoyment of another woman's attention on her, sarcastically claiming that no man had ever shown her that level of affection.

Upon the song's release, various critics and listeners speculated that it was written as a diss track targeting the British singer Charli XCX and her song "Sympathy Is a Knife" (2024), which was allegedly about Swift. Multiple music critics decried the song's lyrics and narrative as unmerited, though others complimented it as a standout from the album due to the relative singularity of its production in comparison to the other tracks. Actually Romantic peaked in the top 10 on the Billboard Global 200 and on the charts in Australia, Canada, Germany, New Zealand, Portugal, Sweden, and the United States.

== Background ==
Charli XCX had collaborated with Taylor Swift on her live shows and concert tours, including as an opening act on Swift's 2018 Reputation Stadium Tour. Upon the release of Charli XCX's 2024 album Brat, fans speculated that the track "Sympathy Is a Knife" was directed at Swift's alleged romantic linking with Matty Healy of the band the 1975, particularly the lyric, "Don't wanna see her backstage at my boyfriend's show", which also references Charli XCX's husband George Daniel, also from the 1975. Charli XCX later denied that any tracks on Brat were intended as diss tracks and said "Sympathy Is a Knife" was not about Swift.

In an August 2024 interview with Vulture, Charli XCX expressed that "people are gonna think what they want to think" and stated "Sympathy Is a Knife" is about her anxiety, insecurities, and wanting to avoid situations that make her feel self-doubt. In the same interview, Swift was said to have lauded Charli XCX's musical sensibilities, calling her writing "surreal and inventive, always" and celebrating what she described as the results of Charli XCX's hard work. Swift further praised Charli XCX's ability to "[take] a song to places you wouldn't expect it to go" and stated that the singer has been "doing it consistently for over a decade".

== Music and lyrics ==
"Actually Romantic"
"Actually Romantic" is an alternative rock, pop-punk, and guitar pop track with influences of 1990s slacker rock

Swift wrote and produced "Actually Romantic" with Max Martin and Shellback. It is an alternative rock, guitar pop, pop-punk, and power pop song, characterized by a grunge electric guitar. It follows the I–vi–III–IV chord progression. Some critics called it melodically reminiscent of the Pixies's "Where Is My Mind?" (1988). Pitchfork's Walden Green described the sound as "diet indie rock"; and Consequence's Paolo Ragusa said the song has an alternative rock feel with influences of slacker rock, 1990s power pop similar to the music of Weezer, and the "more energetic cuts" of Olivia Rodrigo.

Lyrically, "Actually Romantic" addresses an individual whose adversarial fixation on Swift is portrayed as a perverse declaration of love. Multiple critics interpreted the song as a diss track targeting Charli XCX, as the title is speculated to allude to Charli XCX's "Everything Is Romantic" (2024). The lyric mentioning a song whose author feels "sick [seeing Swift's face]" is viewed as a direct reference to "Sympathy Is a Knife". Another line ("High-fived my ex and then you said you're glad he ghosted me") is believed to reference Healy.

== Critical reception ==
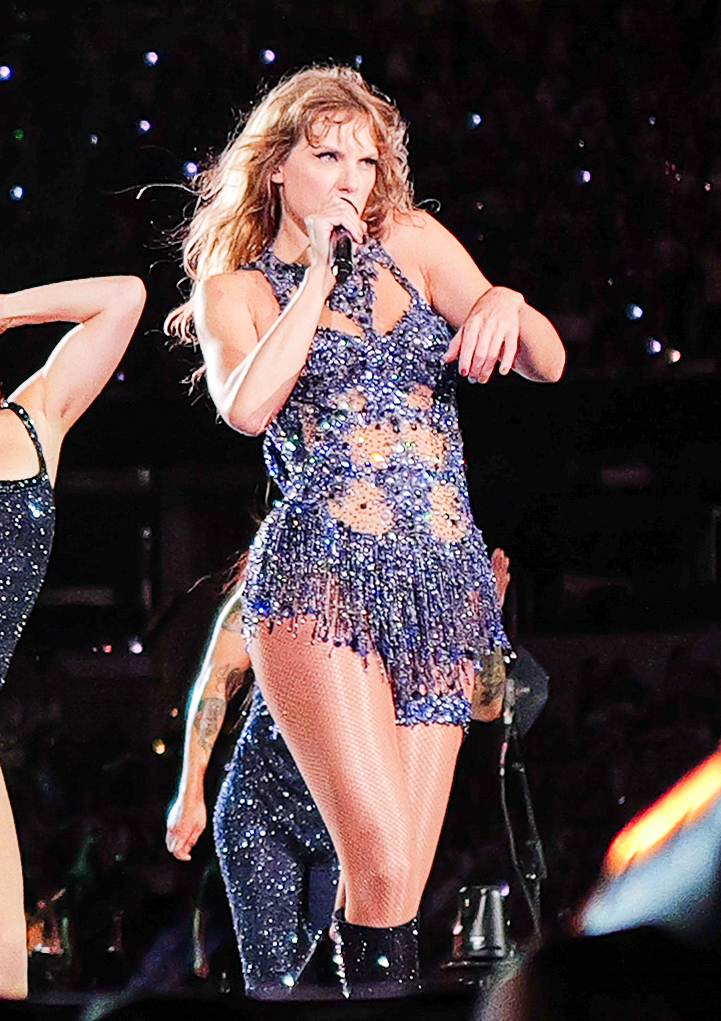
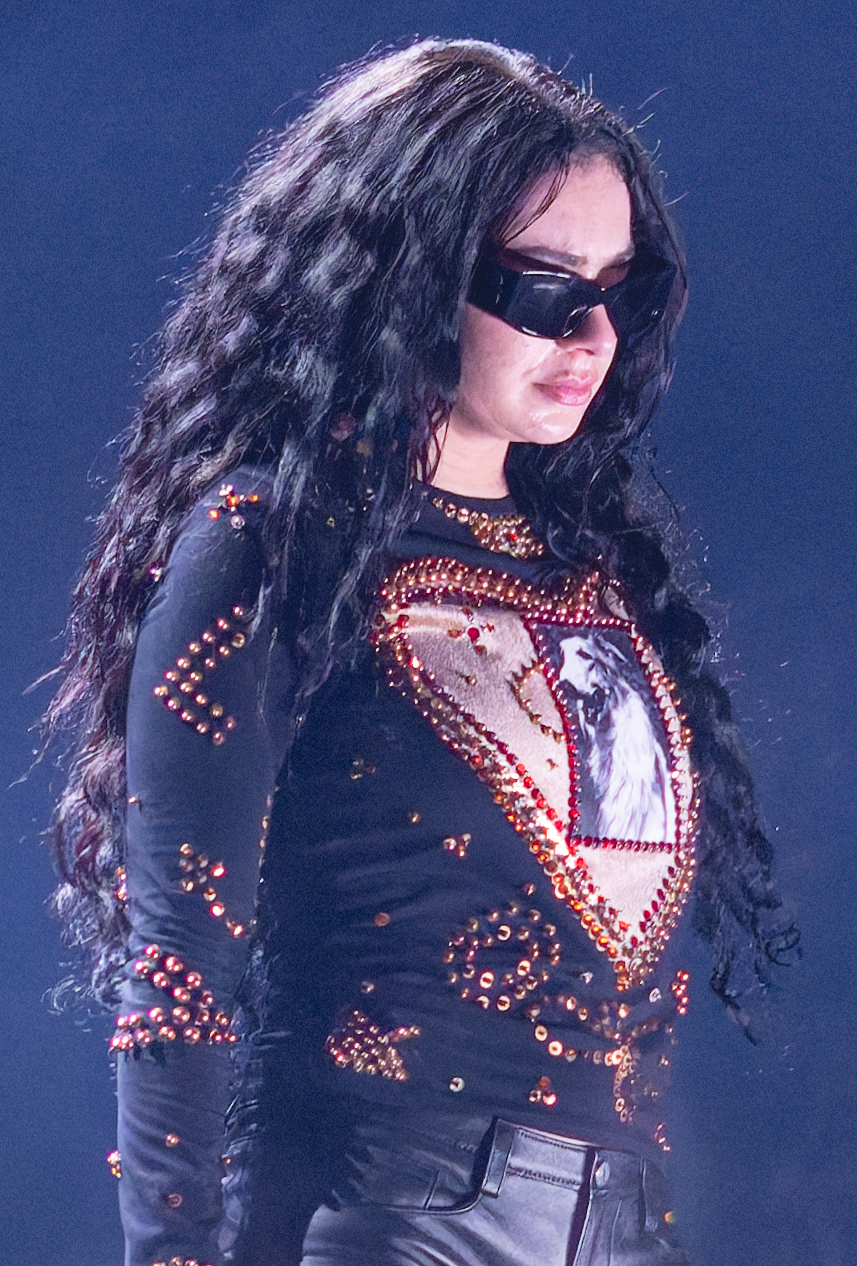
Multiple critics interpreted "Actually Romantic" as a diss track from Swift (left) targeting Charli XCX (right).

Most criticisms of "Actually Romantic" dismissed its narrative as misguided and spiteful. Several commentators questioned whether it was necessary for Swift to convey such a message, given her prominent status as a leading pop star; Laura Snapes of The Guardian called it "queen-bee spite"; and Jaeden Pinder of Pitchfork found it reminiscent of Swift's earliest revenge songs, in which she was "too caught up in anger to see straight", viewing it as standing in contrast to her approach of revising lyrics on Speak Now (Taylor's Version) to avoid anti-feminist interpretations.

Other critics argued that the narrative of "Actually Romantic" was ineffective and led to unwarranted interpretations. Craig Jenkins of Vulture contended that Swift was unable to interpret Charli XCX's song as a "cry for attention" and thus "validates what was once understood as a nonsensical notion of Taylor Swift as a foil". Citing the same reason, Snapes panned the lyrics as emotionally unsophisticated. News.com.au's Joshua Haigh expressed surprise at Swift's perceived inability to empathize with Charli XCX's "insecurity and jealousy", due to the "thought-provoking and nuanced songs" that she had written.

Several positive reviews focused on the production elements. In The New York Times, Wesley Morris said he enjoyed the "cascading verses"; and Lindsay Zoladz highlighted what she called "the most inspired vocal performance on the album", which turns it into an erotic song that "borders on the exotic". DIY's Ben Tipple and Aisling Murphy of The Globe and Mail contended that it has one of the best melodic compositions on the album. In The Daily Telegraph, Neil McCormick selected "Actually Romantic" as one of the album's "interesting outliers" for its evocative content, while Poppie Platt considered it a standout because of its "echoes of vengeful bangers like 'Bad Blood' and 'Blank Space'". On a negative side, Green criticized it as a "Kidz Bop version" of the Pixies's "Where Is My Mind?". Paste listed it as one of the worst songs of 2025; Lydia Wei criticized the "nauseatingly cloying" vocals and the supposed diss at Charli XCX that represented Swift's lack of "grip on reality".

== Personnel ==
Credits are adapted from the liner notes of The Life of a Showgirl.

Studios

- Produced at MXM Studios and Shellback Studios, Stockholm
- Recorded at Shellback Studios, Stockholm
- Mixed at MixStar Studios, Virginia Beach
- Mastered at Sterling Sound, Edgewater, New Jersey

Personnel

- Taylor Swift – lead vocals, songwriting, production
- Max Martin – production, songwriting, piano, keyboards, recording
- Shellback – production, songwriting, programming, bass, drums, guitar, keyboards, piano, mandocello, percussion, recording
- Lasse Mårtén – recording, engineering
- Christopher Rowe – additional recording
- Serban Ghenea – mixing
- Bryce Bordone – assistant mixing
- Randy Merrill – mastering

== Charts ==
Chart performance
Chart (2025)	Peak position
Argentina Hot 100 (Billboard)	42
Australia (ARIA)	8
Brazil Hot 100 (Billboard)	41
Canada Hot 100 (Billboard)	8
Czech Republic Singles Digital (ČNS IFPI)	26
Denmark (Tracklisten)	15
Finland (Suomen virallinen lista)	35
France (SNEP)	50
Germany (GfK)	10
Global 200 (Billboard)	10
Greece International (IFPI)	7
Iceland (Tónlistinn)	12
India International (IMI)	17
Italy (FIMI)	67
Latvia Streaming (LaIPA)	10
Lithuania (AGATA)	27
Luxembourg (Billboard)	9
New Zealand (Recorded Music NZ)	9
Norway (IFPI Norge)	23
Philippines (IFPI)	14
Philippines (Philippines Hot 100)	13
Poland (Polish Streaming Top 100)	38
Portugal (AFP)	10
Singapore (RIAS)	13
Slovakia Singles Digital (ČNS IFPI)	47
Spain (PROMUSICAE)	27
Sweden (Sverigetopplistan)	9
Switzerland Streaming (Schweizer Hitparade)	11
United Arab Emirates (IFPI)	14
UK Streaming (OCC)	8
UK Video Streaming (OCC)	27
US Billboard Hot 100	7

== Certifications ==
Certifications
Region	Certification	Certified units/sales
Australia (ARIA)	Gold	35,000^{‡}
Brazil (Pro-Música Brasil)	Platinum	40,000^{‡}
Canada (Music Canada)	Platinum	80,000^{‡}
New Zealand (RMNZ)	Gold	15,000^{‡}
United Kingdom (BPI)	Silver	200,000^{‡}
^{‡} Sales+streaming figures based on certification alone.
