= Jeanette Söderholm =

Swedish singer

Jeanette Söderholm, born 1967, is a Swedish singer of Jamaican origin.

Jeanette and her sister Diane (ex-Freestyle) first released several club albums under the name Dayeene in 1990. Their first album was United Soul Power. 'Is This Love (Compusex)' was produced by Denniz Pop and Douglas Carr at Cheiron Studios in 1994. During this time, Jeanette also worked as an in-house backing vocalist at Cheiron Studios. Bands or singers for which she recorded backing vocals include Ace of Base (most albums), Army of Lovers, Britney Spears, E-Type, Rednex, and Robyn.

Jeanette and Diane are the half-sisters of Rita Marley, wife of Bob Marley.

Jeanette is married to Swedish producer/songwriter Jonas von der Burg. She is now working under her married name Jeanette von der Burg.
