= Mirror Mirror (Solid Base song) =

Single by Solid Base
- B-side: "Remix"
- Released: 1996
- Genre: Eurodance
- Length: 3:19
- Label: Remixed Records
- Songwriters: Isabelle Heitman; Mattias Eliasson; Jonas Eriksson; Thomas Nordin
- Producers: Jonas Eriksson; Mattias Eliasson

Solid Base singles chronology
"In Your Dreams" (1994)	"Mirror Mirror" (1996)	"You Never Know" (1996)

Music video
- "Mirror Mirror" on YouTube

"Mirror Mirror" is a song recorded by Swedish-Norwegian Eurodance group Solid Base, released in 1996 by Remixed Records as the third single from their debut album, Finally (1996). Performed by lead vocalist Isabelle Heitman, who also co-wrote the lyrics, and rapper Thomas Nordin (aka Teo T.), it was a huge hit in Norway, peaking at number six and spending a total of 11 weeks within VG-lista. But it topped the radio chart Ti i skuddet in April 1996. The single sold to gold. The accompanying music video was made by Norwegian broadcaster NRK and filmed in Frognerparken, Oslo.

== Track listing ==
- CD maxi, Sweden
1. "Mirror Mirror" (Radio Mix) – 3:19
2. "Mirror Mirror" (Dancefloor Dunka Dunka Mix) – 4:28
3. "Mirror Mirror" (Birch & Chris Club Mix) – 5:27
4. "Mirror Mirror" (Snipers Remix) – 5:05

== Charts ==
Chart (1996)	Peak position
Norway (Ti i skuddet)	1
Norway (VG-lista)	6
