= You Never Know (Solid Base song) =

Single by Solid Base

from the album Finally
- B-side: "Remix"
- Released: 1996
- Genre: Eurodance
- Length: 2:58
- Label: Remixed Records
- Songwriters: Isabelle Heitman; Mattias Eliasson
- Producers: Jonas Eriksson; Mattias Eliasson

Solid Base singles chronology
"Mirror Mirror" (1996)	"You Never Know" (1996)	"Let It All Be Sunshine" (1996)

Music video
- "You Never Know" on YouTube

"You Never Know" is a 1996 song recorded by Swedish-Norwegian Eurodance group Solid Base, released as the fourth single from their debut album, Finally (1996). It is sung by lead vocalist Isabelle Heitman, who also co-wrote the lyrics and was successful especially in Scandinavia, where it peaked at number four in Norway and number 12 in Finland; it also charted in Romania. An accompanying music video was also made for the song, filmed in Gamla stan and directed by Mark Nava in Stockholm, Sweden. It was published on YouTube in February 2012, and as of May 2021, the video has been viewed almost 2 million times.

== Track listing ==
- CD maxi, Scandinavia
1. "You Never Know" (Original Version) – 2:58
2. "You Never Know" (Extended Mix) – 4:19
3. "You Never Know" (Peo De Pit Mix) – 3:46
4. "You Never Know" (Viennas Short Mix) – 3:55
5. "You Never Know" (Peo De Pit X-10-Ded-Mix) – 5:28
- CD maxi (Remixes), Scandinavia
1. "You Never Know" (Funk Mix) – 3:40
2. "You Never Know" (R&B Mix) – 3:28
3. "You Never Know" (Extended Funk Mix) – 4:18
4. "You Never Know" (Extended R&B Mix) – 3:51
5. "You Never Know" (Original Version) – 2:58

== Charts ==
=== Weekly charts ===
Chart (1996)	Peak position
Finland (Suomen virallinen lista)	12
Norway (Ti i skuddet)	2
Norway (VG-lista)	4

=== Year-end charts ===
Chart (1997)	Position
Romania (Romanian Top 100)	79
