= Earthquake Visions =

Studio album by It's Alive
- Released: 1993
- Studio: Cheiron Studios, Soundtrade Studios
- Genre: Glam metal
- Length: 43:22 (original release); 50:59 (MFN version)
- Label: BMG
- Producer: It's Alive, with "Someone in the House" co-produced by Per Edwardsson

Earthquake Visions is the album that the glam-style metal band It's Alive released in 1993 and recorded in Cheiron Studios. Earthquake Visions eventually sold a disappointing 30,000 copies, but furthermore established the contact between Cheiron and the band's vocalist Martin White – better known as the famous-to-be producer/songwriter Max Martin.

== Track listing ==
1. "Give Us A Place" (3:51)
2. "Someone In The House" (4:13)
3. "I'm Your Man" (4:25)
4. "Pretend I'm God" (3:23)
5. "Sing This Blues" (4:29)
6. "Wild" (4:08)
7. "Metalapolis" (3:39)
8. "Maybe You Are But I'm Not" (3:11)
9. "Pain" (3:52)
10. "There Is Something" (4:11)
11. "Where I" (3:38)
- Note that the Music for Nations UK release adds two bonus songs; one, called "Play That Funky Music" (4:43) is slotted between "I'm Your Man" and "Pretend I'm God". The other track, called "Parasite" (3:10), is tacked on to the end of the disc, bringing it to a total of 13 songs.

== Personnel ==
- Martin White - vocals, tambourine
- Per Aldeheim - lead guitar
- Kim Björkegren - rhythm guitar
- John Rosth - keyboards
- Peter Kahm - bass guitar
- Gus - drums

== Production ==
- Arranged and produced by It's Alive, with co-production on "Someone in the House" by Pär Edwardson
- Recorded at Cheiron and Soundstage Studios by It's Alive, Ronnie Lahti and Goran Ernlund
- Mixed by Stefan Glauman at MVG Studios
- Mastered by Bjorn Engelman at Cutting Room
