= It's Alive (band) =

Swedish funk metal band

- Origin: Stockholm, Sweden
- Genres: Glam metal, funk metal
- Years active: 1987–1995
- Labels: BMG
- Past members: Martin White; Per Aldeheim; Kim Björkegren; Peter Kahm; Gus; John Rosth

It's Alive was a Swedish glam-style funk metal band, formed in Stockholm in 1987. Karl "Max Martin" Sandberg (born February 26, 1971) was one of the founding members of the band. He dropped out of high school to pursue a career with the band under the nickname Martin White.

In 1988, the band participated in the national rock championships and they also played as the in-house band at a disco in Cyprus. Their self-titled debut album was released in 1991 – originally only 1,000 copies were pressed and later the album was given away as a free cover tape in the UK by the Metal Forces magazine. They landed a record deal on producer Denniz PoP's label and BMG affiliates Cheiron Studios and released the album Earthquake Visions in 1993 (though only 30,000 copies were sold). The band toured Europe in 1994, supporting Kingdom Come.

Frontman Martin White quit in late 1995, and became a successful record producer and songwriter under the alias Max Martin, working with artists such as Ace of Base, Britney Spears and Backstreet Boys, and responsible for numerous hits for other artists. Guitarist Per Aldeheim also worked together with Max Martin and the producer's mentor Denniz Pop at Cheiron Studios.

== Members ==
=== Former ===
- Martin White (a.k.a. Martin Sandberg, later Max Martin) – lead vocals (1985–1995)
- Per Aldeheim – lead guitar (1985–1995)
- Kim Björkegren – rhythm guitar (1985–1995)
- Peter Kahm – bass guitar (1985–1995)
- Gus – drums (1985–1995)
- John Rosth – keyboards (1985–1995)

== Discography ==
- It's Alive (1991)
- Earthquake Visions (1993)
