= Per Aldeheim =

Swedish guitarist, songwriter and producer

- Born: 17 January 1966 (age 59); Stockholm, Sweden
- Genres: Rock, Pop, Hard rock, Metal, Funk metal
- Occupations: Musician; Producer; Songwriter
- Instrument: Guitar
- Years active: 1980s-present
- Labels: BMG
- Formerly of: Lazy; It's Alive

Per Henrik Aldeheim (born 17 January 1966), is a Swedish guitarist, songwriter and producer.

He started out in the business with the band Lazy, also featuring Kim Björkgren. In 1985 they quit the band and started a new band, It's Alive, together with among others including Max Martin (then known as Martin White) as their singer and frontman. It's Alive ceased to exist in 1995 after releasing two albums. Aldeheim has since then worked together with Max Martin as a producer as Cheiron Studios. He also co-wrote and did Arrangements for the Song "Light Discovering Darkness" from the Album Sworn to a Great Divide by Soilwork.
