= Cheiron Studios =

Swedish record label (1992–2000)

Coordinates: 59.332°N 18.026°E

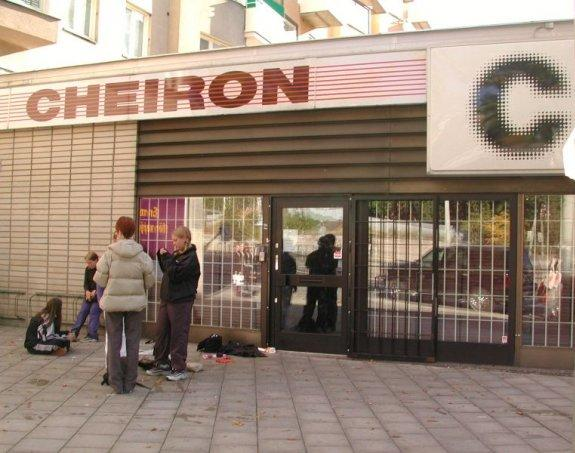
- Cheiron Studios in 2000
- Formerly: SweMix Records & Publishing
- Type: Recording studio
- Industry: Music
- Founded: 1993
- Founder: Denniz PoP; Tom Talomaa
- Defunct: 2000
- Headquarters: Kungsholmen, Stockholm, Sweden
- Parent: BMG
- Website: Official website (archived)

Cheiron Studios (Swedish pronunciation: [ˈɕɛ̌jrɔn]) was a recording studio located in the Kungsholmen district of Stockholm, Sweden. Founded in 1992 by Denniz PoP and Tom Talomaa, it was known for being a place where popular music acts of the late 1990s/early 2000s, such as Backstreet Boys, Boyzone, Robyn, NSYNC, Britney Spears, and Westlife produced many of their greatest hits. In addition, Cheiron Studios was also a record label, Cheiron Records, affiliated with BMG for a while, and a music publishing service (Cheiron Songs), although those ventures were later abandoned in favour of music production.

After Denniz PoP's death in 1998, Cheiron closed in 2000. Talomaa and Max Martin reformed the company as Maratone, while Kristian Lundin and Jake Schulze formed Location Songs, and David Kreuger and Per Magnusson started A Side Productions. The studio is currently owned by Roxy Recordings, which also includes the Hanssonic Studios of Anders Hansson.

== 1986–1992: SweMix ==

In 1986, a group of ten Swedish disc jockeys founded SweMix, a remix service, as a response to DiscoNet, Hot Tracks, and DMC. The group included Dag Krister Volle (Denniz PoP), René Hedemyr (JackMaster Fax), Sten Hallström (StoneBridge), Emil Hellman (SoundFactory), and Johan Järpsten (JJ). In the beginning they produced and distributed song remixes without permission, so-called "bootlegs", for limited underground distribution on their newly founded Remixed Records. Remixed Records attracted attention not only in Scandinavia but also Germany, Italy, and the Netherlands. Tom Talomaa, a nightclub owner, became involved and supported the studio with more sophisticated equipment, and musicians began seeking out the group's services. As a result, two labels were formed: Basement Division for underground artists and SweMix Records via Swedish Sonet, for commercial records.

SweMix Records signed Swedish dance acts such as Dr. Alban, Kayo, Dayeene, and Leila K, and had their first big hit with Dr. Alban's 1990 breakout single "Hello Afrika" (produced by Denniz PoP). In 1991, the company was divided, and Remixed Records was sold to Giovanni Sconfienza, who later converted it into a full-fledged label (releasing artists such as Solid Base and Sonic Dream Collective). The following year, SweMix further split up into SweMix Productions and SweMix Records & Publishing. The latter was sold to BMG and taken over by Denniz PoP and Tom Talomaa, who renamed it Cheiron and began working in the studio in 1992.

In early 1992, the Danish record company Mega Records sent Denniz PoP a demo tape by a then-unknown band called Ace of Base. It included the reggae song "Mr. Ace", written by American singer-songwriter Angelo Negron. Denniz PoP was not initially impressed with it, but after listening to it repeatedly, he decided to remix it. It was re-recorded at the SweMix studio and given the new title "All That She Wants". The track became an unexpected hit and catapulted both Ace of Base and Denniz PoP into international stardom.

== 1993–2000: Cheiron ==
In 1992, Denniz PoP and the SweMix collective parted ways due to creative differences. When Denniz launched Cheiron with Douglas Carr, he introduced influences from a variety of musical styles that were not restricted to dance music. They produced hits for Swedish artists such as Leila K, Papa Dee, Rob'n'Raz, and Herbie, and hired more staff to meet rising demand. In 1994, the studio began working with foreign artists through Zomba, a label owned by BMG.

=== Max Martin ===
"I didn't even know what a producer did", "I spent two years day and night in that studio trying to learn what the hell was going on." – Max Martin, 19 March 2001

As the studio's repertoire expanded, Talomaa offered to release the second album by the Swedish funk metal band It's Alive, titled Earthquake Visions (1993). The record was a flop, but the band's vocalist, Karl Martin Sandberg, who went by the name Martin White, caught Denniz PoP's attention. He invited Sandberg to work with the studio as a songwriter and eventually hired him as an in-house producer. He also renamed him Max Martin. Their first collaboration was the 1995 track "Wish You Were Here" by Rednex, which reached No. 1 in several European countries.

Cheiron next hired the duo of John Amatiello and Kristian Lundin (collectively known as "Amadin") as songwriters and producers. David Kreuger and Per Magnusson were next to join.

1994 turned out to be a successful year for Cheiron. Denniz PoP and Amadin coproduced Dr. Alban's third album, Look Who's Talking!, which attained gold certification in Sweden. They followed it with the 1994 debut album by Swedish Eurodance singer E-Type, titled Made in Sweden, which included the number one hits "Set the World on Fire" and "This Is the Way".

=== 1996: Backstreet Boys and beyond ===
From 1996 until its closure, Cheiron shared a joint production and publishing venture with the Zomba Group. This began with the American boy band Backstreet Boys, whose eponymous debut album was partly recorded at Cheiron and came out in 1996. It included the hit singles "We've Got It Goin' On" (written by Denniz PoP, Max Martin, and Herbie Crichlow) and "Quit Playing Games (with My Heart) (Martin, Crichlow), which went platinum and landed at No. 2 on the Billboard Hot 100.

Cheiron next produced Ace of Base's second album, The Bridge, and Per Magnusson with David Kreuger produced DeDe's debut album, TBA (Totally Bombastic Anecdotes). Denniz and Martin wrote two songs with Robyn for her debut album, Robyn Is Here: "Do You Know (What It Takes)" and "Show Me Love". The latter ended up on the Billboard top 10 and was featured in the 1998 Swedish movie Fucking Åmål (the English distribution borrowed the song's title for the film due to the obscenity).

PoP/Martin produced Leila K's 1995 single "Electric", whose chorus was sung by Jessica Folcker. The two also worked on the 1995 debut album by 3T, titled Brotherhood.

=== 1997–1998: Hit factory ===
In 1997, songwriter Andreas Carlsson was hired. A year later, the Irish boy band Boyzone approached Cheiron for material to put on their new album, Where We Belong. Magnusson and Kreuger teamed up with songwriter Jörgen Elofsson, who had previously recorded his own music under the name Shane, to write the song "Will Be Yours". Magnusson and Kreuger produced two tracks for the Danish group Michael Learns to Rock that were included on their 1999 compilation MLTR: a new version of "The Actor" and "I'm Gonna Be Around".

In 1998, Cheiron worked with the boy bands 5ive and NSYNC and the girl group Solid HarmoniE, and collaborated with Bryan Adams on the song "Cloud Number Nine". The same year, Denniz PoP and Martin wrote several songs for Jessica Folcker, whose career began as a backing singer for Dr. Alban and Ace of Base and who became Denniz's girlfriend. Her debut album, Jessica, was a success, with singles such as "Tell Me What You Like" and "How Will I Know (Who You Are)", both of which went platinum. Folcker received Grammis nominations for Best Newcomer and Best Female Artist. The same year, Denniz PoP and Max Martin shared the Honorary Jury Prize at the Grammis.

By that point, however, Denniz was in poor health and unable to attend the award ceremony, having been diagnosed with stomach cancer in November 1997.

=== 1998: Death of Denniz PoP ===
Cheiron's rise to international prominence was tempered by the death of its founder. Only 35 years old, Denniz died of cancer on 30 August 1998, after which Martin took over as director of the studio.

=== 1998–1999: Britney Spears, Celine Dion ===
Early in 1998, Jive Records sent Cheiron a 16-year-old American girl named Britney Spears to record a set of songs, including "...Baby One More Time". The track had originally been written for TLC, who declined it, as they were on hiatus. Spears's debut album, also titled ...Baby One More Time, was an international hit and became the best-selling debut album by a teenage female artist. Later the same year, Martin began working with Rami Yacoub and Angelo Negron on the production of the Backstreet Boys' next album, Millennium, which was released on Jive a year later and went on to become one of the best-selling albums of all time. Martin, together with Lundin and Carlsson, also co-wrote Celine Dion's 1999 hit single "That's the Way It Is".

=== 1999–2000: Westlife and final years ===
Magnusson and Kreuger teamed up again with Elofsson to work on the debut album by the new Irish boy band Westlife. They wrote three songs that appeared on the group's 1999 eponymous album. The single "If I Let You Go" was released in August and hit No. 1 on the UK singles chart. "Fool Again" also opened in first position on the charts.

The year 2000 was busy for Cheiron. They worked with Britney Spears on her second album, Oops!... I Did It Again, which broke more sales records and went on to become the fastest-selling album by a female artist. Westlife recorded songs for their second album, Coast to Coast, and the track "My Love" went straight to No. 1 in the UK. The Backstreet Boys recorded another hit for their fourth album, Black & Blue, "Shape of My Heart", which was written by Lisa Miskovsky, Martin, and Yacoub. The album became a huge success and sold millions of copies worldwide.

By the end of the year, however, Cheiron had concluded their joint production and publishing venture with Zomba Group, which they had signed in 1996, and the decision was made to close the studio. Talomaa and Martin wrote on the company website, "Cheiron was created with the intention of having fun, making a few hits and not getting too serious about it. We feel the 'hype' of Cheiron has become bigger than [the studio] itself and it's time to quit while we're ahead."

== Cheiron sound ==
The "Cheiron sound" became a prominent part of the Y2K pop era and has been closely associated with turn-of-the-millennium pop music, particularly the late-1990s and early-2000s teen pop boom. According to The Guardian, the "Cheiron sound" was described as melodic but hard-edged, highly hook-driven and dramatic, combining technical accuracy with a characteristically Swedish "happy/sad" quality comparable to ABBA. Other descriptions of the studio's output have noted its blend of R&B grooves with Swedish pop melodies and large, major-chord choruses, accompanied by music videos with a futuristic aesthetic.

== Artists associated with Cheiron ==
- 5ive
- Ace of Base
- Army of Lovers
- Backstreet Boys
- Bon Jovi
- Boyzone
- Britney Spears
- Bryan Adams
- Celine Dion
- Dana Dragomir
- Dayeene
- DeDe
- Dr. Alban
- E-Type
- Gary Barlow
- Jessica Folcker
- Leila K
- LFO
- M2M
- Meja
- Michael Learns to Rock
- NSYNC
- Rednex
- Robyn
- Solid HarmoniE
- Vacuum
- Westlife

== Cheiron staff ==
- Denniz PoP (1993–1998)
- Herbie Crichlow (1993–1999)
- Douglas Carr (1993–1995)
- Max Martin (1994–2000)
- Kristian Lundin (1994–2000)
- Per Magnusson (1994–2000)
- David Kreuger (1994–2000)
- Alexander Kronlund (1995–2000)
- Andreas Carlsson (1996–2000)
- Rami Yacoub (1997–2000)
- Jörgen Elofsson (1997–2000)
- Alexandra Talomaa (1997–2000)

== Awards and nominations ==
- 1995: Swedish Dance Music Awards – Best Producer (Denniz PoP)
- 1996 Swedish Dance Music Awards – Best Producers (Denniz PoP & Max Martin)
- 1997 Swedish Grammis – Special Award (Denniz PoP & Max Martin)
- 1997 Swedish Grammis nomination – Composer of the Year (Max Martin & Andreas Carlsson)
- 1999 Swedish Grammis – Special Award (Cheiron Productions)
- 1999: ASCAP – Songwriter of the Year (Max Martin)
- 2000: ASCAP – Songwriter of the Year (Max Martin)
- 2001: ASCAP – Songwriter of the Year (Max Martin)
