= I Wonder Why (Sonic Dream Collective song) =

Single by Sonic Dream Collective

from the album Gravity
- B-side: "Remix"
- Released: 1995
- Genre: Dance-pop; Eurodance; reggae fusion
- Length: 3:30
- Label: Remixed Records; Epic Records
- Songwriter: Linn Engström
- Producer: Anders Wågberg

Sonic Dream Collective singles chronology
"Oh, Baby All" (1995)	"I Wonder Why" (1995)	"Happy Tune" (1996)

Music video
- "I Wonder Why" on YouTube

"I Wonder Why" is a song recorded by Swedish Eurodance band Sonic Dream Collective, released in 1995 as the fourth single from their debut album, Gravity (1995). It is the follow-up to their successful hit "Oh, Baby All" and peaked at number 39 in Sweden, with 4 weeks within the singles chart. Lead vocalist Linn Engström wrote the lyrics for the song. A music video was also produced to promote the single.

== Critical reception ==
Pan-European magazine Music & Media wrote, "The trio has already proved itself quite capable of climbing the charts; this one should have no trouble either. The US radio version is a little too bland, but EHR will love the mid-tempo reggae pop mix and its happy melodies."

== Track listing ==
- 12" single, Sweden
1. "I Wonder Why" (1200 Hard Club Mix) – 6:24
2. "I Wonder Why" (Happy 12" X-10-Ded-Mix) – 5:25
3. "I Wonder Why" (Clean Club Mix) – 5:31
4. "I Wonder Why" (US Album Extended Version) – 5:16
- CD single, Sweden
1. "I Wonder Why" (Radio Version) – 3:30
2. "I Wonder Why" (Optical II Mix) – 5:09
- CD maxi, Europe
1. "I Wonder Why" (U.S. Radio Version) – 3:04
2. "I Wonder Why" (Reggae Pop Mix) – 4:50
3. "I Wonder Why" (Happy 12" X-10-ded Mix) – 5:25
4. "I Wonder Why" (1200 Hard Club Mix) – 6:24

== Charts ==
Chart (1995)	Peak position
Sweden (Sverigetopplistan)	39
