= Max Martin =

Swedish record producer and songwriter (born 1971)

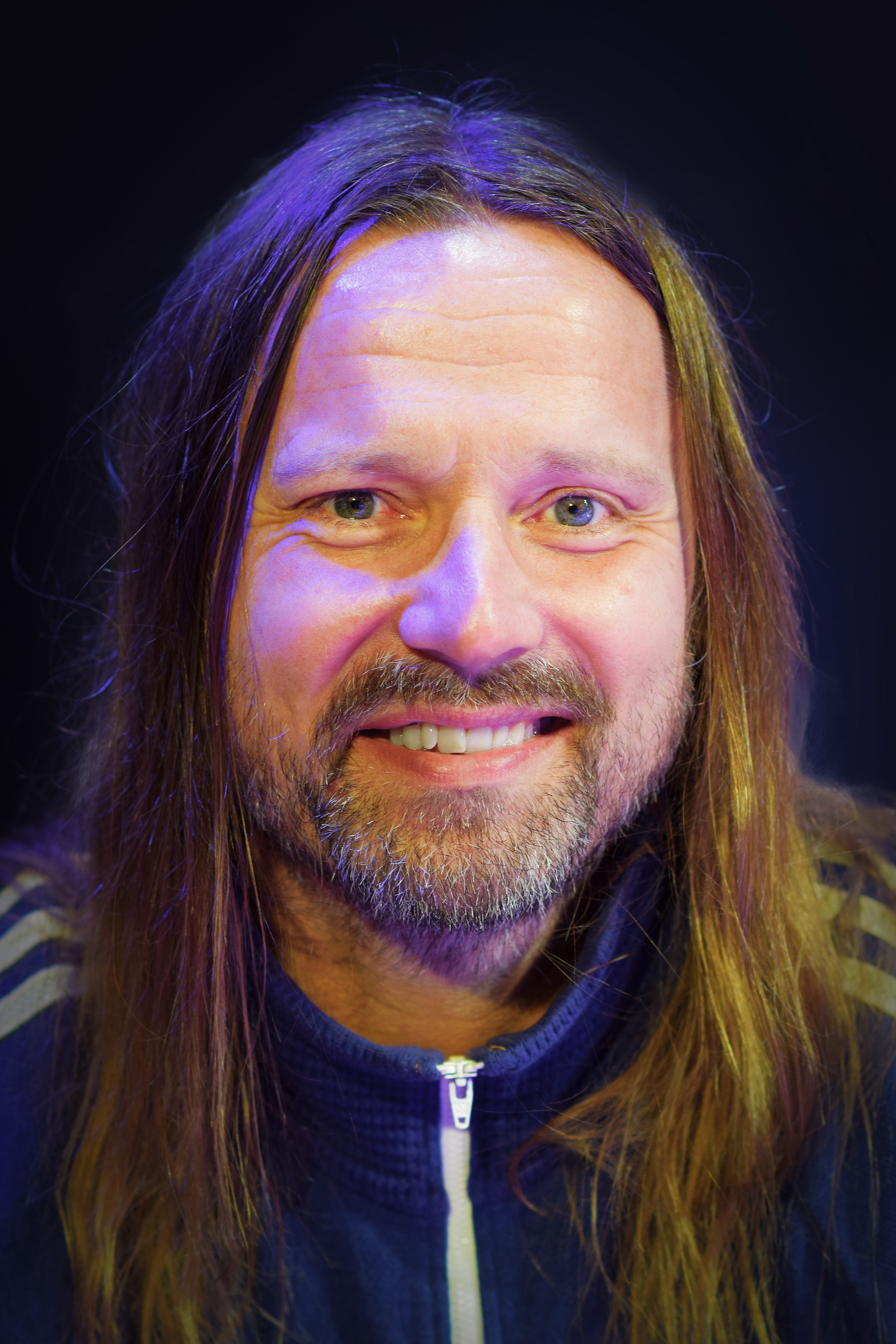
- Martin in 2023
- Born: Karl Martin Sandberg; 26 February 1971 (age 55); Stockholm, Sweden
- Other name: Martin White
- Occupations: Record producer; songwriter
- Years active: 1984–present
- Spouse: Jenny Petersson (m. 2011)
- Children: 1
- Awards: Full list
- Musical career
- Genres: Pop; dance; R&B; rock
- Instruments: Keyboards; guitar; vocals
- Labels: Jive; Cheiron; RCA; Capitol; LaFace; Island; Location Songs; Bertelsmann; Atlantic; Maratone; MxM
- Formerly of: It's Alive

Karl Martin Sandberg (born 26 February 1971), known professionally as Max Martin, is a Swedish record producer and songwriter. He rose to prominence in the late 1990s with songwriting credits on a string of hit singles, such as Britney Spears's "...Baby One More Time" (1998), the Backstreet Boys' "I Want It That Way" (1999), Celine Dion's "That's the Way It Is" (1999), and NSYNC's "It's Gonna Be Me" (2000).

Martin has written or co-written 31 Billboard Hot 100 number-one singles; 29 of which he has produced or co-produced, an all-time record for the chart as of June 2026. His credits include Katy Perry's "I Kissed a Girl" (2008) and "Roar" (2013), Maroon 5's "One More Night" (2012), Taylor Swift's "Shake It Off", "Blank Space" (2014) and "The Fate of Ophelia" (2025), Ariana Grande's "Yes, And?", "We Can't Be Friends (Wait for Your Love)" (2024) and "Hate That I Made You Love Me" (2026), Ed Sheeran and Justin Bieber's "I Don't Care" (2019) and The Weeknd's "Blinding Lights" (2019) and "Save Your Tears" (2020). "Blinding Lights" is the best performing song of all time according to the chart. Martin has written the second-most number-one singles on the chart, behind only Paul McCartney (32), having surpassed John Lennon (26) with his 27th number one in March 2024. Many of Martin's hits were used in the 2019 jukebox musical & Juliet.

In early 2013, The Hollywood Reporter tallied his singles sales at over 135 million copies. According to Variety, his net worth was approximately $260 million in 2017; the previous year, his corporate entity generated revenue of $54 million with a profit of $19 million. Martin has won the ASCAP Songwriter of the Year award a record 11 times. He has also won five Grammy Awards, including Producer of the Year, and nominations for an Academy Award and two Golden Globe Awards.

== Life and career ==
=== Early career and It's Alive ===
Sandberg was born and grew up in Stenhamra, Ekerö Municipality, Stockholm County. His mother was a middle school teacher and his father was a police officer. As a child, Martin was a student of Sweden's public music-education scheme, and once said he had "public music education to thank for everything".

As a teenager he sang in a variety of bands before joining a glam-style metal band called It's Alive in 1985 as their singer and frontman. It's Alive was formed by Peter Kahm and ex-Lazy members Per Aldeheim and Kim Björkgren on guitars, and John Rosth who had been a member of Lineout. Martin eventually dropped out of high school to pursue a career in music with his band under the nickname "Martin White". In 1988 It's Alive participated in Rock-SM (English: Swedish Rock Championship), a nationwide battle of the bands, and had a residency at a nightclub in Cyprus. The band got a breakthrough in 1991, as Dave Constable of Megarock Records offered them to make a demo record. The later debut album was originally pressed in 1,000 copies and later on given away as a free cover tape in the UK by the Metal Forces magazine.

The decision to focus on a music career paid off as they landed a record deal on producer Denniz Pop's label Cheiron Records, a BMG affiliate. After recording their second album Earthquake Visions, they released three singles in conjunction with the record and toured through Europe in 1994 supporting Kingdom Come. Earthquake Visions eventually sold a disappointing 30,000 copies, despite being released in as many as 30 countries. More importantly though, Martin also began collaborating on songs with Denniz Pop. Recognizing a talent for writing pop songs in the young rocker, Denniz Pop renamed his new protégé Max Martin and eventually became Martin's mentor.

=== Working with Cheiron and Denniz PoP ===
I didn't even know what a producer did, I spent two years–day and night–in that studio trying to learn what the hell was going on.

— Martin, 2001

In 1993, Martin was hired by Cheiron Studios and spent some time learning the basics, before the first production collaboration between PoP and Martin: the Rednex song "Wish You Were Here" in 1994. When Martin produced the intro to E-Type's song "This Is the Way", E-Type and PoP credited it to the made up producer alias "Max Martin", thus inventing his artist name. Martin was informed after-the-fact, when the printed records came back. They both worked on Ace of Base's second album, The Bridge (1995), shortly thereafter, as well as on albums by 3T, Army of Lovers and Leila K. To date, The Bridge has sold more than six million copies worldwide, including one million in the United States. When Martin eventually left his band It's Alive in late 1995, he was replaced by Anders Hansson.

In 1995, Cheiron Studios was hired by Zomba to work on Backstreet Boys' self-titled debut album Backstreet Boys (1996). Zomba became the main working partner since the success in 1995. Martin took part in the production of "Quit Playing Games (with My Heart)" (1996), co-written with Herbie Crichlow, a single which quickly went platinum and climbed to No. 2 on the Billboard Hot 100, as well as the singles "As Long As You Love Me" (1997) and "Everybody (Backstreet's Back)" (1997). The album was not released in the U.S. until 1997, but was released overseas and caught on all across Europe, eventually selling around 8 million copies worldwide. This led to the Backstreet Boys being relaunched in their home country later on, this time more successfully. Later that year, Martin co-wrote and co-produced Robyn's hits "Show Me Love" and "Do You Know (What It Takes)" which ended up on the Billboard Hot 100 top 10.

In 1998, Cheiron Productions worked on albums by Five and Jessica Folcker. Jessica Folcker had first been hired as a backing singer for tracks with Ace of Base and Dr. Alban, and her debut album Jessica became an instant hit with singles like "Tell Me What You Like" and "How Will I Know Who You Are" which both sold platinum. After Denniz PoP died of cancer that same summer, Martin took over as director of Cheiron Studios. He soon started working with writer/producer Rami Yacoub, who continued to be his partner for many years. Martin also wrote two songs with Bryan Adams during this time, "Cloud Number Nine" and "Before The Night Is Over".

In late 1999, Celine Dion released "That's the Way It Is", a song co-written by Max Martin to promote her greatest hits album All the Way... A Decade of Song. The song became a hit, going to number 1 on the adult contemporary charts in the United States and Canada, and reaching top 10 all over the world. Since the song was released in November 1999, it has cycled 500,000 times on almost 1400 radio stations across Canada and the U.S. In 2003 Martin co-wrote and produced three songs for Dion's album One Heart. One of them, called "Faith", was released in 2003 as a promotional single in Canada and reached number 4 on the Quebec Airplay Chart and number 37 on the Canadian Adult Contemporary Chart.

Martin, Andreas Carlsson, and Rami Yacoub wrote Westlife's song "I Need You" for the first Westlife album Westlife (1999). Martin, Nick Jarl, Steve Mac, and Patric Jonsson wrote Westlife's song "You Make Me Feel" for their second album Coast to Coast (2000). Max Martin, Rami Yacoub, and Andreas Carlsson also wrote one of Westlife's hits, "When You're Looking Like That", for their second album Coast to Coast (2000).

=== Backstreet Boys ===
Martin wrote, co-wrote, and co-produced 7 out of the 12 songs on the Backstreet Boys' third album Millennium (1999), including all the singles. "I Want It That Way", a hit song Martin co-wrote with Andreas Carlsson and co-produced with Kristian Lundin, became the group's biggest single to date and it is still popular today, being voted No. 10 in the MTV/Rolling Stone list of the "100 Greatest Pop Songs". 100 Greatest Songs of the '90s, a VH1 special, ranked the song at number 3, making it the highest ranked boy-band single and pop song. Millennium sold over 1.1 million units in its first week in the United States, setting a record for most albums sold in its debut week (that record was later beaten by NSYNC's 2000 album No Strings Attached), and was the best-selling album in the world.

When working on her own solo album, to be released in 2001 on Stockholm Records, Lisa Miskovsky wrote the lyrics for the Backstreet Boys' hit single "Shape of My Heart" with Max Martin and Rami. The song, originally written for Miskovsky's own album, was passed on to the Backstreet Boys by Max Martin when Miskovsky decided that it did not fit her style. The song became the first single off the group's fourth album Black & Blue (2000). In the first week of release, "Shape of My Heart" immediately jumped into the Top Five in Sweden, Norway, Canada, Germany and another 15 countries. Black & Blue, containing several songs produced and written by Martin, sold 1.6 million units in its first week in America. Martin again received ASCAP's award "Songwriter of the Year" both in 2000 and 2001. In April 2013 the Backstreet Boys member Brian Littrell invited Martin to collaborate on their single "In A World Like This". The single peaked at No.6 in the Oricon chart and performed well in the rest of the world. Martin collaborated on the Never Gone songs "Climbing the Walls", "Just Want You to Know", "Siberia" and "I Still...". Martin wanted the album to be more of a contemporary, alternative pop album with a little R&B. The resulting album had a more organic music style with more live instruments, and was a departure from the Backstreet Boys' earlier work.

=== Britney Spears ===
[Martin] gets exactly what I am saying when I tell him what I want and don't want musically. His melodies are incredible and he is always coming up with weird sounds, which I love... There is nobody I feel more comfortable collaborating with in the studio

— Spears on working with Martin

In 1998, Martin wrote and co-produced Spears' debut single, "...Baby One More Time", for her debut album of the same name. The single was originally offered to the Backstreet Boys and TLC, though both passed on the song. That same year, Martin also co-wrote and co-produced the third single "(You Drive Me) Crazy". By 1999, the album ...Baby One More Time had sold over 15 million copies in the U.S., certifying Diamond Status. Also, within a year of its release, ...Baby One More Time had become the best-selling LP by a teenager in history, selling over 30 million copies.

Martin was the first non-American citizen ever to win ASCAP's award "Songwriter of the Year" in 1999, an award he also won in 2000 and 2001.

Martin worked on Spears's follow-up records Oops!... I Did It Again (2000) and Britney (2001). He co-wrote and co-produced the singles "Oops!... I Did It Again" (2000), "Lucky" (2000), "Stronger" (2000), "Overprotected" (2001), and "I'm Not a Girl, Not Yet a Woman" (2002).

The duo ended up parting ways when Spears distanced herself from teen pop. Spears recorded In the Zone (2003) and Blackout (2007).

At the request of Spears, Martin produced and wrote for Spears' sixth studio album Circus (2008). Martin co-wrote and produced the provocatively titled electro pop song, "If U Seek Amy", which was chosen by fans to be the third single of the album. Martin then produced the number one hit, "3", for Spears' compilation album The Singles Collection (2009).

Martin was one of the executive producers of Spears's seventh album, Femme Fatale (2011), alongside Dr. Luke. He produced several songs for the album, including the successful singles "Hold It Against Me", "Till the World Ends", "I Wanna Go", and "Criminal".

=== Startup of Maratone ===
Following the death of Denniz PoP, Cheiron Studios was closed down in 2000. Martin and Tom Talomaa then started a new production company named Maratone in January 2001 and moved into the famous Cosmos Studios building. The first songs to be written and produced at Maratone were four tracks for Britney Spears's album Britney (2001). The Maratone production crew initially consisted of producers/songwriters Max Martin, Rami, Alexandra, Arnthor Birgisson and Shellback. Following the work with Celine Dion on the album One Heart in 2003, few new hits appeared from Maratone until 2005.

In 2004, Kelly Clarkson traveled to Sweden to collaborate with Martin and Dr. Luke on her second studio album, Breakaway. These collaborations resulted in the rock-influenced singles "Since U Been Gone" (2004) and "Behind These Hazel Eyes" (2005). In 2009, Martin co-wrote Clarkson's single "My Life Would Suck Without You", which was a number one hit.

In 2005, Martin collaborated with the Norwegian singer Marion Raven for the release of her debut album, titled Here I Am, writing and co-writing the songs "Break You", "End of Me", "Here I Am", "Little By Little", "In Spite of Me", and "Six Feet Under".

=== Pink ===
Martin co-wrote and produced three songs on Pink's platinum-selling album I'm Not Dead, including the singles, "U + Ur Hand" (2006), "Who Knew" (2006), and "Cuz I Can" (2007).

Martin also collaborated with Pink for her next album, Funhouse (2008). Martin co-wrote the first smash hit single, "So What" (2008), plus the singles "Please Don't Leave Me" (2009) and "I Don't Believe You" (2009). The duo wrote "Whataya Want From Me" during the sessions for Funhouse, but ultimately the song was recorded and released as a single by Adam Lambert.

Later, Martin co-wrote hits for Pink including "Raise Your Glass" (2010), "Fuckin' Perfect" (2011), and "Just like Fire" (2016), for various Pink-related projects. For her seventh studio album, Beautiful Trauma (2017), he co-wrote "Revenge", "Whatever You Want", "For Now", and "Secrets". In 2019, for her eighth studio album, Hurts 2B Human (2019), he co-wrote "(Hey Why) Miss You Sometime". In 2023, he co-wrote and co-produced lead single "Never Gonna Not Dance Again" from her eighth studio album Trustfall.

=== Usher ===
In 2010, Martin co-wrote and co-produced Usher's song "DJ Got Us Fallin' in Love" that went number-one on the US Rhythmic charts and top-ten on the main Hot 100. In 2011, Usher and Martin co-wrote single "Fast Car" from the 2012 repackage of Taio Cruz's third album TY.O. Working together again, Martin co-wrote and co-produced on Usher's seventh studio album Looking 4 Myself in 2012 making the dance-pop song "Scream" that went number-one on the US Dance Club Songs chart and number nine on the US Billboard Hot 100 chart. It was certified platinum by the Recording Industry Association of America (RIAA).

=== Avril Lavigne ===
Martin worked with Avril Lavigne on two songs, "Alone" and "I Will Be", which were released on some deluxe editions of Lavigne's third studio album The Best Damn Thing (2007). In 2010, "Dancing Crazy", a song they co-wrote and Martin co-produced in the Goodbye Lullaby sessions, was released by Miranda Cosgrove and charted at #100 on the Billboard Hot 100 chart. Martin would later work on four additional songs for Lavigne's fourth studio album Goodbye Lullaby (2011): the three singles "What the Hell" (2011), "Smile" (2011), and "Wish You Were Here" (2011), and album track "I Love You".

=== Jessie J ===
Max Martin first worked with Jessie J on her international hit "Domino", which achieved top ten success in countries including Canada, The United States, and Australia. Following the success of "Domino", Martin co-produced "Bang Bang" (2014) for Jessie J, Ariana Grande and Nicki Minaj.

=== Katy Perry ===
Max Martin worked with Katy Perry on her second album One of the Boys (2008), including the number-one single "I Kissed a Girl", and top 5 hit single "Hot n Cold". He also worked on her follow-up album Teenage Dream (2010), including the Billboard Hot 100 numbers-one hit singles "California Gurls" (2010), "Teenage Dream" (2010), "E.T." (2011),"Last Friday Night (T.G.I.F.)" (2011) and the top ten hit "The One That Got Away" (2011). Martin also co-wrote the songs "Part of Me" (2012) and "Wide Awake" (2012), the former of which topped the Billboard Hot 100.

For her fourth album Prism (2013), he co-wrote and produced ten of its songs, including the No. 1 singles "Roar" (2013) and "Dark Horse" (2013). In 2016, Martin and Perry collaborated on standalone single "Rise" for the NBC Coverage of the 2016 Summer Olympics, reaching number 11 on the Billboard Hot 100.

On her fifth album Witness (2017), Martin co-wrote numerous songs, including the lead single "Chained to the Rhythm" which peaked at number 4 on the Hot 100, as well as the title track. In 2024, Martin would reunite with Perry, co-writing "Gorgeous" from her seventh studio album 143.

=== Christina Aguilera ===
Confirmed by RCA Executives on 18 December 2011, Martin worked on Christina Aguilera's seventh studio album Lotus (2012) and was the producer of her lead single, "Your Body" (2012), as well as another song titled "Let There Be Love". Both songs reached the top of the Billboard dance/club chart.

=== Taylor Swift ===
Martin has collaborated with Taylor Swift on four of her albums. Their first collaboration was the Billboard Hot 100 number-one hit "We Are Never Ever Getting Back Together" (2012) for her album Red (2012). Martin also co-wrote and co-produced two other singles on the album: "I Knew You Were Trouble" (2012), which peaked at number two on the Billboard Hot 100, and "22" (2013). He co-wrote "Message in a Bottle" for Red, but it was not released until 2021, when it was included on Red (Taylor's Version) and issued as a single.

Martin also contributed to her follow-up record, 1989 (2014). He co-wrote and co-produced ten songs, including the singles "Shake It Off", "Blank Space", "Bad Blood", "Wildest Dreams", "Style", and "New Romantics". The former three songs reached number one on the Billboard Hot 100.

Martin later worked with Swift on Reputation (2017), co-writing and co-producing eight songs, including the singles "...Ready for It?", "End Game", and "Delicate".

In August 2025, Swift announced her twelfth album The Life of a Showgirl, with Martin co-producing alongside Swift and Shellback.

=== Ariana Grande ===
Martin first worked with Ariana Grande on her second studio album My Everything (2014). Martin produced the first single, "Problem", which peaked at No. 2 on the Billboard Hot 100 as well as No. 1 in the UK, later becoming one of the list of best-selling singles. Other songs from the album Martin produced include "Break Free" (peaking at No. 4 on the Billboard Hot 100) and "Bang Bang" (peaking at No. 3 on the Billboard Hot 100 and No. 1 in the UK).

Martin contributed heavily to her third studio album, Dangerous Woman (2016), most notably the singles "Dangerous Woman", "Into You", and "Side to Side", all of which peaked within the top twenty on the Billboard Hot 100.

Martin also contributed to her follow-up records Sweetener (2018) and Thank U, Next (2019), co-writing the singles "No Tears Left to Cry", "God Is a Woman", and "Break Up with Your Girlfriend, I'm Bored", among other songs.

Grande released her lead single "Yes, And?" from her seventh studio album Eternal Sunshine on 12 January 2024. She wrote and produced the song with Martin and Ilya Salmanzadeh. Martin also co-wrote and co-produced 10 other tracks from the album, including "We Can't Be Friends (Wait for Your Love)". He would later co-write and co-produce all five new songs on her 2025 reissue Eternal Sunshine Deluxe: Brighter Days Ahead, which all charted on the Billboard Hot 100 chart.

In 2026, it was revealed that Martin had co-written and co-produced Grande's album Petal, including the number one single "Hate That I Made You Love Me", as well as the top 10 hit Petal.

=== The Weeknd ===
Martin co-wrote and produced three songs from the Weeknd's sophomore album, Beauty Behind the Madness (2015), namely "Can't Feel My Face"—which peaked at number one on the Billboard Hot 100—"In the Night" and "Shameless". He co-wrote and produced four songs ("Rockin'", "Love To Lay", "A Lonely Night", and "Ordinary Life") from the Weeknd's third album, Starboy (2016).

He contributed "Hardest to Love", "Scared to Live", "Blinding Lights", "In Your Eyes", and "Save Your Tears" to the Weeknd's fourth studio album, After Hours (2020). The latter album was both a critical and commercial success.

Martin also co-wrote and assisted in the production of "Take My Breath", released in August 2021. He also produced or co produced the majority of the songs on the Weeknd's fifth studio album Dawn FM (2022).

Martin appears on The Weeknd's sixth studio album Hurry Up Tomorrow (2025), co-writing and/or producing the songs "Open Hearts ", "Give Me Mercy", "Drive", "Society", "Runaway", and discarded lead single "Dancing in the Flames".

=== Coldplay ===
Martin appeared as a keyboardist on two singles from Coldplay's eighth studio album Everyday Life (2019): "Orphans" and "Champion of the World". In June 2021, Coldplay announced their ninth studio album Music of the Spheres (2021), with Martin serving as the album's producer. The album received mixed reviews from critics but was a commercial success, debuting at the top of the UK Albums Chart and becoming the album with most sales in a week in the United Kingdom since Ed Sheeran's No.6 Collaborations Project (2019).

Music of the Spheres (2021) included songs such as "Higher Power", "Let Somebody Go", which Selena Gomez appears on, and "My Universe", which BTS appears on. "My Universe" debuted at number one on the Billboard Hot 100, giving Martin his twenty fifth number one as a writer and twenty third number one as a producer on the chart. With that song, he tied with George Martin for producer with most Billboard Hot 100 number ones. (He would later pass Martin.) He recently co-wrote and co-produced a majority of their 2024 studio album Moon Music.

=== Others ===
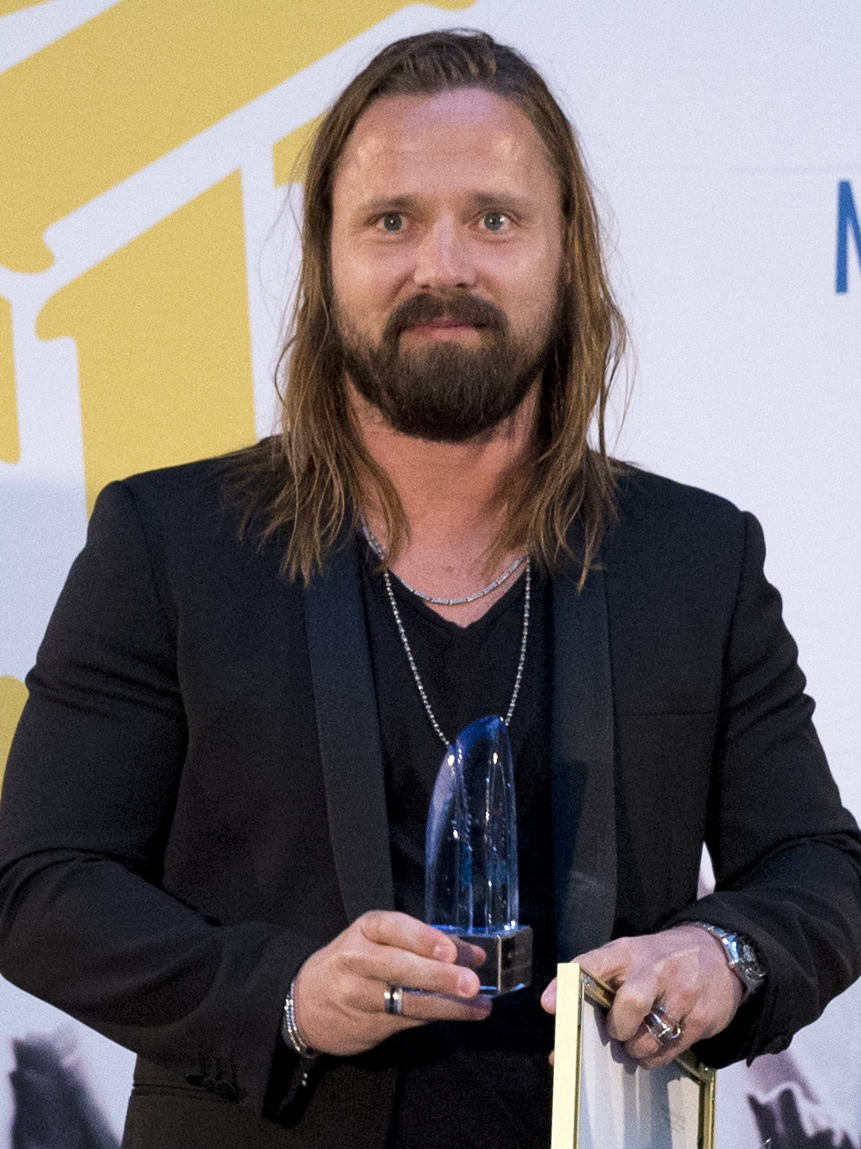
Martin in 2015

Martin co-wrote "It's My Life" with fellow Songwriters Hall of Fame inductees Jon Bon Jovi and Richie Sambora. It was released on 8 May 2000 as the lead single from Bon Jovi's seventh studio album, Crush. The song was certified 6× platinum in Australia; 3× platinum in the United States; 2× platinum in New Zealand, Spain, and the United Kingdom; platinum in Austria, Belgium, Denmark, Germany, Italy, Sweden, and Switzerland; and gold in Brazil, France, Japan, and the Netherlands.

Fourth runner-up of the eighth season of American Idol Allison Iraheta collaborated with Martin on her debut album. Her first single, "Friday I'll Be Over U" was written by Martin. On 17 August 2009, American Idol runner-up Adam Lambert announced via Twitter that he was in New York City with Martin recording a song for his debut album. It turned out to be the song "Whataya Want From Me"; that was also written by P!nk.

Martin also co-wrote "Into the Nightlife", a popular club track recorded by Cyndi Lauper in 2008 and produced, alongside Zedd, and co-wrote "Beauty and a Beat", on Justin Bieber's 2012 album Believe.

Martin also produced several albums for Eurodance act E-type.

In 2005, Max Martin wrote the first single-song for pop-punk duo the Veronicas, "4ever", with Lukasz "Dr. Luke" Gottwald, for their debut studio album The Secret Life Of... (2005). Also he wrote "Everything I'm Not", the second single-song of the Veronicas, the same year, again with Gottwald, Rami, Jessica Origliasso and Lisa Origliasso for the same album.

In January 2014, Martin produced a two-minute advertisement entitled "Volvo XC70: Made By Sweden", featuring soccer player Zlatan Ibrahimović. The video of the advertisement received several million views on YouTube.

2008 saw him collaborate with Daughtry for one of their singles from their 2006 debut album Daughtry: the song "Feels Like Tonight" written with Dr. Luke.

In early 2014, Martin co-wrote the song "Dare (La La La)" for Shakira's self-titled album.

In April–May 2014, Martin produced Jennifer Lopez's song "First Love", alongside Ilya, Shellback and Savan Kotecha.

Between 2014 and 2015, Martin produced singles "Ghost Town" and "Another Lonely Night" by Adam Lambert, before executive-producing his third studio album The Original High.

In January 2015, he co-wrote and co-produced Ellie Goulding's "Love Me like You Do", which reached number 3 on the Billboard Hot 100, while also producing several songs from her album Delirium including the hit single "On My Mind", which was released on 17 September 2015.

In July 2015, Martin produced Demi Lovato's song "Cool for the Summer" which reached number 11 on the Billboard Hot 100. He also contributed to "Confident" and "For You" from their fifth studio album Confident.

Martin also worked with Selena Gomez on her second studio album, Revival, producing its third single "Hands to Myself", which became her third consecutive top 10 hit from the album.

In November 2015, Adele's album 25 was released and Martin co-wrote and co-produced the record's third single "Send My Love (To Your New Lover)" with Shellback; it would eventually become a top 10 hit in the US and the UK.

In 2016, he co-wrote the song "Can't Stop the Feeling!" by Justin Timberlake which is also the title song for the film Trolls with Shellback. The song became Timberlake's fifth and Martin's twenty-second number-one hit in the US. It reached the top spot in 16 other countries. The song gave Timberlake and Martin their first nomination for an Academy Award for Best Original Song.

In 2019, Martin co-produced and co-wrote Ed Sheeran's and Justin Bieber's hit single "I Don't Care". Martin also co-wrote Sam Smith's single "How Do You Sleep?".

In November 2019, Martin co-wrote and co-produced the Weeknd's single "Blinding Lights".

In 2020, Martin co-produced and co-wrote "Stupid Love", the first single from Lady Gaga's sixth studio album, Chromatica. This marks the first time the two have worked together.

In 2021, Martin co-wrote and co-produced "Can I Get It" by Adele from her fourth studio album, 30.

In 2022, Martin co-produced and co-wrote Måneskin's single "Supermodel". He also co-produced and co-wrote Lizzo's song "2 Be Loved (Am I Ready)", from her fourth studio album, Special.

In 2023, Martin co-wrote and co-produced Conan Gray's singles "Never Ending Song" and "Killing Me". He also co-wrote and co-produced Ed Sheeran's single "Eyes Closed" from his fifth studio album.

== Artistry ==
=== Influences ===
When accepting the Polar Music Prize, Martin highlighted ABBA, Kiss, Prince and Lasse Holm as inspirations.

=== Creative process ===
The traditional division of work in the record industry often has the artist or songwriter writing the songs and then hiring a producer to help shape the sound. But at Cheiron, the producers wrote the songs, played the instruments, and engineered and mixed the recordings, and the artist was only brought in near the end of the process to do the vocals. For example, on Britney Spears's second album Oops!... I Did It Again (2000), Cheiron had already written seven songs and had proceeded to record the layers of music before Britney even arrived at the studios in early November 1999. It took her only one week to do the vocals. Martin and his team worked more like a band that alternated singers. Martin explained his working method:

I want to be part of every note, every single moment going on in the studio. I want nothing forgotten, I want nothing missed. I'm a perfectionist. The producer should decide what kind of music is being made, what it's going to sound like–all of it, the why, when and how. – LA Times, 6/05/00

== Legacy ==
Martin's influence on the music field is also seen in the effect he has had on co-producers. The music site Stereogum singles out three people as his "disciples", Savan Kotecha, Dr. Luke, and Shellback. Time magazine reported that "There's a cluster of high-powered songwriters who are based in Sweden, and the grandmaster is Max Martin" and that when Kotecha worked with One Direction he credited Martin's influence: "We work melody first. That's Max Martin's school. We'll spend days, sometimes weeks, challenging the melody. The goal is to make it sound like anyone can do this, but it's actually very difficult. In Sweden, you don't do anything until you do it right." The New Yorker reported that Martin was Dr. Luke's "Swedish mentor and frequent collaborator. If Luke is the Skywalker of pop songcraft, Max is the Obi-Wan: the reclusive master. ...The vital spark in the musical emergence of Dr. Luke was meeting Max Martin". Dr. Luke himself says of the chemistry between him and Martin, "It happened really fast. It was magical. ...[Martin taught me that] Instead of making tracks for five thousand people, why not make tracks for a million?" The magazine for Sweden's collection society STIM reported that Shellback became an "apprentice" with Martin acting as "his mentor" at Maratone Studios after 2006 when "Max Martin saw something special in the young man from Karlshamn. Judging by the incredible success Shellback has had since, Martin's A&R skills are some of the best in the music business".

Martin's song catalog was used in the stage musical & Juliet, which opened on the West End in 2019.

== Personal life ==
Martin met his wife, Jenny (née Petersson) from Mörrum, around 2000 and they married in 2011. The couple have a daughter, born around 2001.

Martin lives in Los Angeles and in Stockholm.

== Songwriting and production ==
=== Billboard Hot 100 number-one singles ===
Since 1998, Martin has written or co-written 31 Billboard Hot 100 number-one hit songs (most of which he has also produced or co-produced). Eight of these songs debuted at number one on the chart.

1. 1998 – "...Baby One More Time" by Britney Spears
2. 2000 – "It's Gonna Be Me" by NSYNC
3. 2008 – "I Kissed a Girl" by Katy Perry
4. 2008 – "So What" by Pink
5. 2009 – "My Life Would Suck Without You" by Kelly Clarkson
6. 2009 – "3" by Britney Spears
7. 2010 – "California Gurls" by Katy Perry featuring Snoop Dogg
8. 2010 – "Teenage Dream" by Katy Perry
9. 2010 – "Raise Your Glass" by Pink
10. 2011 – "Hold It Against Me" by Britney Spears
11. 2011 – "E.T." by Katy Perry featuring Kanye West
12. 2011 – "Last Friday Night (T.G.I.F.)" by Katy Perry
13. 2012 – "Part of Me" by Katy Perry
14. 2012 – "One More Night" by Maroon 5
15. 2012 – "We Are Never Ever Getting Back Together" by Taylor Swift
16. 2013 – "Roar" by Katy Perry
17. 2013 – "Dark Horse" by Katy Perry featuring Juicy J
18. 2014 – "Shake It Off" by Taylor Swift
19. 2014 – "Blank Space" by Taylor Swift
20. 2015 – "Bad Blood" by Taylor Swift featuring Kendrick Lamar
21. 2015 – "Can't Feel My Face" by The Weeknd
22. 2016 – "Can't Stop the Feeling!" by Justin Timberlake
23. 2019 – "Blinding Lights" by The Weeknd
24. 2021 – "Save Your Tears" by The Weeknd and Ariana Grande
25. 2021 – "My Universe" by Coldplay and BTS
26. 2024 – "Yes, And?" by Ariana Grande
27. 2024 – "We Can't Be Friends (Wait for Your Love)" by Ariana Grande
28. 2025 – "The Fate of Ophelia" by Taylor Swift
29. 2026 – "Opalite" by Taylor Swift
30. 2026 – "Hate That I Made You Love Me" by Ariana Grande
31. 2026 – "Patient Zero" by Taylor Swift

=== Billboard Hot 100 top 20 songs ===
Since 1995, Martin has written, co-written, or co-produced 126 Billboard Hot 100 top 20 hits.

1. 1995 – "Beautiful Life" by Ace of Base (top 20)
2. 1997 – "Quit Playing Games (with My Heart)" by Backstreet Boys (top 10)
3. 1997 – "Everybody (Backstreet’s Back)" by Backstreet Boys (top 10)
4. 1997 – "Show Me Love" by Robyn (top 10)
5. 1997 – "Do You Know (What It Takes)" by Robyn (top 10)
6. 1999 – "...Baby One More Time" by Britney Spears (No. 1)
7. 1999 – "(You Drive Me) Crazy" by Britney Spears (top 10)
8. 1999 – "That’s the Way It Is" by Celine Dion (top 10)
9. 1999 – "I Want It That Way" by Backstreet Boys (top 10)
10. 1999 – "Show Me the Meaning of Being Lonely" by Backstreet Boys (top 10)
11. 2000 – "Oops!... I Did It Again" by Britney Spears (top 10)
12. 2000 – "Shape of My Heart" by Backstreet Boys (top 10)
13. 2000 – "Stronger" by Britney Spears (top 20)
14. 2000 – "It’s Gonna Be Me" by NSYNC (No. 1)
15. 2004 – "Since U Been Gone" by Kelly Clarkson (top 10)
16. 2004 – "Behind These Hazel Eyes" by Kelly Clarkson (top 10)
17. 2006 – "Let U Go" by Ashley Parker Angel (top 20)
18. 2006 – "U + Ur Hand" by Pink (top 10)
19. 2006 – "Who Knew" by Pink (top 10)
20. 2008 – "I Kissed a Girl" by Katy Perry (No. 1)
21. 2008 – "Hot n Cold" by Katy Perry (top 10)
22. 2008 – "So What" by Pink (No. 1)
23. 2009 – "My Life Would Suck Without You" by Kelly Clarkson (No. 1)
24. 2009 – "Please Don’t Leave Me" by Pink (top 20)
25. 2009 – "If U Seek Amy" by Britney Spears (top 20)
26. 2009 – "3" by Britney Spears (No. 1)
27. 2010 – "Whataya Want from Me" by Adam Lambert (top 10)
28. 2010 – "California Gurls" by Katy Perry featuring Snoop Dogg (No. 1)
29. 2010 – "Dynamite" by Taio Cruz (top 10)
30. 2010 – "DJ Got Us Fallin’ in Love" by Usher (top 10)
31. 2010 – "Teenage Dream" by Katy Perry (No. 1)
32. 2010 – "Raise Your Glass" by Pink (No. 1)
33. 2010 – "Teenage Dream" by Glee Cast (top 10)
34. 2010 – "F**kin’ Perfect" by Pink (top 10)
35. 2011 – "Hold It Against Me" by Britney Spears (No. 1)
36. 2011 – "What the Hell" by Avril Lavigne (top 20)
37. 2011 – "Blow" by Kesha (top 10)
38. 2011 – "E.T." by Katy Perry featuring Kanye West (No. 1)
39. 2011 – "Loser Like Me" by Glee Cast (top 10)
40. 2011 – "Till the World Ends" by Britney Spears (top 10)
41. 2011 – "Last Friday Night (T.G.I.F.)" by Katy Perry (No. 1)
42. 2011 – "I Wanna Go" by Britney Spears (top 10)
43. 2011 – "Domino" by Jessie J (top 10)
44. 2011 – "The One That Got Away" by Katy Perry (top 10)
45. 2012 – "Part of Me" by Katy Perry (No. 1)
46. 2012 – "Scream" by Usher (top 10)
47. 2012 – "Wide Awake" by Katy Perry (top 10)
48. 2012 – "One More Night" by Maroon 5 (No. 1)
49. 2012 – "We Are Never Ever Getting Back Together" by Taylor Swift (No. 1)
50. 2012 – "Beauty and a Beat" by Justin Bieber featuring Nicki Minaj (top 10)
51. 2012 – "Daylight" by Maroon 5 (top 10)
52. 2012 – "I Knew You Were Trouble" by Taylor Swift (top 10)
53. 2013 – "22" by Taylor Swift (top 20)
54. 2013 – "Roar" by Katy Perry (No. 1)
55. 2013 – "Unconditionally" by Katy Perry (top 20)
56. 2013 – "Dark Horse" by Katy Perry (No. 1)
57. 2014 – "Birthday" by Katy Perry (top 20)
58. 2014 – "Problem" by Ariana Grande featuring Iggy Azalea (top 10)
59. 2014 – "Break Free" by Ariana Grande featuring Zedd (top 10)
60. 2014 – "Bang Bang" by Jessie J, Ariana Grande and Nicki Minaj (top 10)
61. 2014 – "Shake It Off" by Taylor Swift (No. 1)
62. 2014 – "Love Me Harder" by Ariana Grande featuring The Weeknd (top 10)
63. 2014 – "Blank Space" by Taylor Swift (No. 1)
64. 2015 – "Love Me Like You Do" by Ellie Goulding (top 10)
65. 2015 – "Style" by Taylor Swift (top 10)
66. 2015 – "Bad Blood" by Taylor Swift featuring Kendrick Lamar (No. 1)
67. 2015 – "Can't Feel My Face" by The Weeknd (No. 1)
68. 2015 – "Cool for the Summer" by Demi Lovato (top 20)
69. 2015 – "Wildest Dreams" by Taylor Swift (top 10)
70. 2015 – "On My Mind" by Ellie Goulding (top 20)
71. 2015 – "Focus" by Ariana Grande (top 10)
72. 2015 – "In the Night" by The Weeknd (top 20)
73. 2016 – "Hands to Myself" by Selena Gomez (top 10)
74. 2016 – "Dangerous Woman" by Ariana Grande (top 10)
75. 2016 – "Just Like Fire" by Pink (top 10)
76. 2016 – "Can’t Stop the Feeling!" by Justin Timberlake (No. 1)
77. 2016 – "Into You" by Ariana Grande (top 20)
78. 2016 – "Send My Love (To Your New Lover)" by Adele (top 10)
79. 2016 – "Rise" by Katy Perry (top 20)
80. 2016 – "Side to Side" by Ariana Grande featuring Nicki Minaj (top 10)
81. 2017 – "Chained to the Rhythm" by Katy Perry featuring Skip Marley (top 10)
82. 2017 – "...Ready for It?" by Taylor Swift (top 10)
83. 2017 – "Gorgeous" by Taylor Swift (top 20)
84. 2017 – "End Game" by Taylor Swift featuring Ed Sheeran and Future (top 20)
85. 2018 – "Delicate" by Taylor Swift (top 20)
86. 2018 – "No Tears Left to Cry" by Ariana Grande (top 10)
87. 2018 – "God Is a Woman" by Ariana Grande (top 10)
88. 2019 – "Break Up with Your Girlfriend, I’m Bored" by Ariana Grande (top 10)
89. 2019 – "I Don’t Care" by Ed Sheeran and Justin Bieber (top 10)
90. 2019 – "Beautiful People" by Ed Sheeran featuring Khalid (top 20)
91. 2019 – "Don’t Call Me Angel" by Ariana Grande, Miley Cyrus and Lana Del Rey (top 20)
92. 2019 – "Blinding Lights" by The Weeknd (No. 1)
93. 2020 – "Stupid Love" by Lady Gaga (top 10)
94. 2020 – "In Your Eyes" by The Weeknd (top 20)
95. 2020 – "Save Your Tears" by The Weeknd featuring Ariana Grande (No. 1)
96. 2021 – "Take My Breath" by The Weeknd (top 10)
97. 2021 – "Wildest Dreams (Taylor’s Version)" by Taylor Swift (top 20)
98. 2021 – "My Universe" by Coldplay and BTS (No. 1)
99. 2022 – "Sacrifice" by The Weeknd (top 20)
100. 2023 – "Eyes Closed" by Ed Sheeran (top 20)
101. 2023 – "Style (Taylor’s Version)" by Taylor Swift (top 10)
102. 2023 – "Bad Blood (Taylor’s Version)" by Taylor Swift (top 10)
103. 2023 – "Blank Space (Taylor’s Version)" by Taylor Swift (top 20)
104. 2024 – "Yes, And?" by Ariana Grande (No. 1)
105. 2024 – "We Can’t Be Friends (Wait for Your Love)" by Ariana Grande (No. 1)
106. 2024 – "The Boy Is Mine" by Ariana Grande (top 20)
107. 2024 – "Dancing in the Flames" by The Weeknd (top 20)
108. 2025 – "Twilight Zone" by Ariana Grande (top 20)
109. 2025 – "The Fate of Ophelia" by Taylor Swift (No. 1)
110. 2025 – "Elizabeth Taylor" by Taylor Swift (top 10)
111. 2025 – "Father Figure" by Taylor Swift (top 10)
112. 2025 – "Wood" by Taylor Swift (top 10)
113. 2025 – "Wi$h Li$t" by Taylor Swift (top 10)
114. 2025 – "Actually Romantic" by Taylor Swift (top 10)
115. 2025 – "The Life of a Showgirl" by Taylor Swift featuring Sabrina Carpenter (top 10)
116. 2025 – "Eldest Daughter" by Taylor Swift (top 10)
117. 2025 – "Cancelled!" by Taylor Swift (top 10)
118. 2025 – "Ruin the Friendship" by Taylor Swift (top 20)
119. 2025 – "Honey" by Taylor Swift (top 20)
120. 2026 – "Opalite" by Taylor Swift (No. 1)
121. 2026 – "Hate That I Made You Love Me" by Ariana Grande (No. 1)
122. 2026 – "Petal" by Ariana Grande (top 10)
123. 2026 – "Patient Zero" by Taylor Swift (No. 1)
124. 2026 – "Cleveland!" by Taylor Swift (top 10)
125. 2026 – "Babylon" by Taylor Swift (top 10)
126. 2026 – "Pink Clouding" by Taylor Swift (top 10)

== Awards and nominations ==
=== Academy Awards ===
Year	Nominee / work	Award	Result
2017	"Can't Stop the Feeling!"	Best Original Song	Nominated

=== ASCAP Pop Music Awards ===
Year	Award	Result
1999	Songwriter of the Year	Won
2000	Songwriter of the Year	Won
2001	Songwriter of the Year	Won
2011	Songwriter of the Year	Won
2012	Songwriter of the Year	Won
2013	Songwriter of the Year	Won
2014	Songwriter of the Year	Won
2015	Songwriter of the Year	Won
2016	Songwriter of the Year	Won
2017	Songwriter of the Year	Won
2018	Songwriter of the Year	Won

=== Golden Globe Awards ===
Year	Nominee / work	Award	Result
2016	"Love Me Like You Do"	Best Original Song	Nominated
2017	"Can't Stop the Feeling!"	Best Original Song	Nominated

=== Grammy Awards ===
Year	Nominee / work	Award	Result	Ref.
2000	"I Want It That Way"	Record of the Year	Nominated	
2000	"I Want It That Way"	Song of the Year	Nominated	
2000	Millennium	Album of the Year	Nominated	
2011	Teenage Dream	Album of the Year	Nominated	
2013	"We Are Never Ever Getting Back Together"	Record of the Year	Nominated	
2014	Red	Album of the Year	Nominated	
2014	"Roar"	Song of the Year	Nominated	
2015	"Shake It Off"	Record of the Year	Nominated	
2015	"Shake It Off"	Song of the Year	Nominated	
2015	Himself	Producer of the Year, Non-Classical	Won	
2016	"Can't Feel My Face"	Record of the Year	Nominated	
2016	"Blank Space"	Record of the Year	Nominated	
2016	"Blank Space"	Song of the Year	Nominated	
2016	Beauty Behind the Madness	Album of the Year	Nominated	
2016	1989	Album of the Year	Won	
2016	1989	Best Pop Vocal Album	Won	
2016	"Love Me like You Do"	Best Song Written for Visual Media	Nominated	
2017	"Can't Stop the Feeling!"	Best Song Written for Visual Media	Won	
2017	"Just like Fire"	Best Song Written for Visual Media	Nominated	
2017	25	Album of the Year	Won	
2017	Himself	Producer of the Year, Non-Classical	Nominated	
2020	Thank U, Next	Album of the Year	Nominated	
2023	30	Album of the Year	Nominated	
2023	Special	Album of the Year	Nominated	
2023	Music of the Spheres	Album of the Year	Nominated	
2025	"Yes, And?"	Best Dance Pop Recording	Nominated	
2027	"The Fate of Ophelia"	Record of the Year	Pending	
2027	The Life of a Showgirl	Album of the Year	Pending	
2027	"Hate That I Made You Love Me"	Song of the Year	Pending	

=== Polar Music Prize ===
Year	Nominee / work	Award	Result	Ref.
2016	Self	Polar Music Prize	Honoree	

=== Primetime Emmy Awards ===
Year	Nominee / work	Award	Result	Ref.
2023	"A Beautiful Game" (from Ted Lasso)	Outstanding Original Music and Lyrics	Won	

=== Tony Awards ===
Year	Nominee / work	Award	Result
2023	& Juliet	Best Musical	Nominated

=== Miscellaneous awards ===
Year	Nominee / work	Award	Result
1996	Denniz PoP & Max Martin	Swedish Dance Music Awards 1996 – Best Producers	Won
1997	Denniz PoP & Max Martin	Grammis Awards – Special Jury Prize	Won
2010	Max Martin	STIM Platinum Guitar	Won
2016	Max Martin	Polar Music Prize	Won

== Music Rights Awareness Foundation ==
In 2016, Max Martin, Björn Ulvaeus and pop songwriter Niclas Molinder founded the "Music Rights Awareness Foundation". This political foundation aims to increase knowledge of music rights worldwide, through education and support, and to help music creators to take control of their rights and be able to live on their music – regardless of economical, geographical and cultural conditions.

=== WIPO for Creators ===
The World Intellectual Property Organization (WIPO) and the Music Rights Awareness Foundation (MRAF) have established a consortium, WIPO for Creators, to promote awareness of intellectual property (IP) rights and support creators in securing recognition and fair remuneration for their work. The initiative was launched through an agreement signed by WIPO Director General Francis Gurry and MRAF co-founders Björn Ulvaeus, Niclas Molinder, and Max Martin; it seeks to engage public and private stakeholders in global education and support programs. Emphasizing the importance of effective copyright systems, especially amid the COVID-19 crisis and the growing complexity of the digital marketplace, the consortium aims to strengthen creators' understanding of IP rights and data management to ensure proper compensation and credit for their contributions. Bjorn Ulvaeus, shared a video explaining how knowledge of IP rights is key to a successful music career.

== See also ==
- Swedish pop music
