= Rami Yacoub =

Swedish record producer (born 1975)

- Born: 17 January 1975 (age 51); Stockholm, Sweden
- Genres: Pop; dance-pop; pop rock; power pop; R&B; europop
- Occupations: Record producer; songwriter
- Years active: 1988–present
- Labels: Jive; RCA; Capitol; LaFace; Island; BMG; Atlantic

Rami Yacoub (Arabic: رامي يعقوب; born 17 January 1975), also known by the mononym Rami, is a Palestinian-Swedish record producer and songwriter and former member of the songwriting/production houses Cheiron Studios and Maratone. Yacoub collaborated extensively with Max Martin in the early part of his career. He has worked with acts such as Ariana Grande, Lady Gaga, Demi Lovato, Selena Gomez, Britney Spears, Nicki Minaj, Madonna, Carly Rae Jepsen, Charli XCX, Bon Jovi, Backstreet Boys, One Direction, Arashi, Westlife, the Saturdays, P!nk, Celine Dion, Enrique Iglesias, Tiësto, Avicii, NSYNC, 5 Seconds of Summer, Lindsay Lohan, Weezer, Måneskin, Foster the People, Taio Cruz and Loreen.

== Biography ==
Yacoub began his music career at the age of 13 when he began playing bass and writing songs in a band in Stockholm.

Yacoub had also a short career as a vocalist but then decided to give all his attention to writing and producing instead. By 18 he had discovered production when, with the aid of a "sampler, a little mixing board, synthesizers", he began doing remixes.

In 1998, he was approached by Max Martin, who was looking for a new production partner, and asked to join the legendary Cheiron Studios in Stockholm. Rami's first production collaboration with Martin was on "...Baby One More Time", Britney Spears' debut single.

Following ten years of service, Rami split amicably from Maratone in early 2008 because he felt that "he needed to go [his] own way." After taking several years off, he began putting together his own production group based at his Kinglet Studios in Los Angeles and Stockholm, Sweden.

== Influences ==
Rami Yacoub has said that growing up he listened to the Beatles, Prince, and Tom Jones. He has also stated that he is influenced by other acts including Mötley Crüe, AC/DC, and Iron Maiden. He considers Denniz Pop his music industry "godfather" and personal mentor.
