= Dayeene =

Swedish soul/house music group

DaYeene
- Origin: Sweden
- Genres: Soul, house
- Years active: 1988–1994
- Label: SweMix
- Past members: Jeanette Söderholm; Diane Söderholm

DaYeene was a Swedish soul/house music group active in the early 1990s. It consisted of the sisters Jeanette and Diane Söderholm. Diane had previously been a vocalist in the Swedish synthpop band Freestyle.

The duo was one of many new Swedish acts associated with the early 1990s Nordik beat scene that specialized in urban music. Notable artists were Papa Dee, Kayo, Rob'n'Raz, and Titiyo. DaYeene guest featured on most of these artists' albums. They were signed to the label SweMix, one of the very early Swedish labels specializing in urban music.

The duo got started when SweMix co-founder StoneBridge did a remix for Frankie LaMotte in 1989, and needed backing vocalists. He loved their voices and signed the sisters.

While the first single, "We're On This Case", was a Salt-n-Pepa inspired hip hop track with the two sisters rapping, the majority of their output was soulful club music. "And It Hurts" was released as a single in the summer of 1999, including in the UK. Two albums were released in the 1990s, with their biggest hits being "Alright" in February 1991, and "Revelation" in November 1993. It belatedly peaked at No. 63 in the UK Singles Chart in July 1999.

During this time, Jeanette Söderholm also worked as an in-house backing vocalist at Cheiron Studios.

== Discography ==
=== Albums ===
- United Soul Power (1990)
  - "Believe" 2:05
  - "Big Bad World" 4:37
  - "I Found You" 3:19
  - "D.D.D. (Dead Drearie Dearie)" 3:25
  - "Dizzy Morning" 3:00
  - "Drive My Car" 3:02
  - "Go To Work" 1:23
  - "Solution" 4:43
  - "The B-Side" 2:40
  - "United Soul Power" 4:54
  - "Karma Is The Sign" 3:18
  - "We're On This Case" 3:08
  - "I'm Coming" 4.01
- Primetime (1992)
  - "Prime Time" (The K Mix) 4:14
  - "Alright" 4:24
  - "Good Thing" 3:52
  - "Freedom" 3:40
  - "Your Love" 3:16
  - "Love The Reggae Bad" 4:47
  - "To Be Yourself" 3:37
  - "Around The World" 3:20
  - "Who's Gonna Take You Back" 4:46
  - "Danger Lovin'" 3:43
  - "Love The Reggae Bad" (Yellow Cab Mix) 3:28
  - "D'Yall's Gonna Rock The Place" (Moronic Dub Edit) 4:02
  - "Prime Time" (The Original Big Bass Dub) 2:55

=== Singles ===
Year	Single	Peak chart positions		Album
Year	Single	SWE	UK	Album
1989	"We're On This Case"	—	97	United Soul Power
1990	"Big Bad World"	—	—	United Soul Power
1990	"Drive My Car"	—	—	United Soul Power
1990	"Dizzy Morning / Karma Is The Sign"	—	—	United Soul Power
1991	"Your Love"	—	—	Primetime
1991	"Alright"	31	—	Primetime
1992	"Good Thing"	—	78	Primetime
1992	"Around The World"	—	84	Primetime
1993	"Revelation"	30	—	non-album single
1994	"Is This Love? (CompuSex)"	—	—	non-album single
1997	"Dancing With Tears In My Eyes"	—	—	non-album single
1998	"And It Hurts"	60	63	non-album single
"—" denotes releases that did not chart or were not released.
