= Sonic Dream Collective =

Swedish pop band

Sonic Dream Collective was a Swedish pop group from Uppsala.

The band had its breakthrough with the 1995 single "Don't Go Breaking My Heart", which reached number five on the Billboard Hot Dance Breakouts Club Play chart in the United States in 1997. Shortly after its release, a Polish version of the song titled "Nie jestem zła" was recorded by Magdalena Sokołowska, performing under the stage name Magdalena. Her version blended elements of Eurodance and disco polo.

The group achieved its greatest success with the third single "Oh, Baby All", which peaked at number two in Sweden and topped the Swedish national radio P3 Tracks chart. Their debut album, Gravity, was released the same year (and in 1997 in the US). Band members included singer-songwriter Linn Engström, songwriter Jon Hällgren, and producer Anders Wågberg. Between 1994 and 1997, the band operated its own record label, Flying Duck Music, alongside producer Stefan Warnberg.

A collaboration with Giovanni Sconfienza and the label Remixed Records led to the release of their second and final album, Dustproof, in 1998. By this time, the group had shortened its name to Sonic Dream. Dustproof featured a collaboration with American guitarist Raven Storm, who was recording at Flying Duck studios at the time. Wågberg added rock elements to the music using Storm's guitar parts, though most of Storm's solos were removed from the final mix to maintain the band's established musical style. Storm appears most prominently on the song "Colors of the Wind".

Their song "Love" was featured in the Dancemania compilation series and in the video game Dance Dance Revolution 2ndMix.

== Songs ==
- "Take Me Back" (1994)
- "Don't Go Breaking My Heart" (1995)
- "Oh, Baby All" (1995)
- "I Wonder Why" (1995)
- "Happy Tune" (1996)
- "Dig Deeper" (1997)
- "Love" (1997)
- "Heaven Knows" (1998)
- "Pray" (1998)
- "Taking Five" (1999)
