= Solid Base =

Swedish-Norwegian Eurodance duo

- Origin: Stockholm, Sweden
- Genres: Eurodance, Pop, EDM, Euro-House
- Years active: 1994–2004, 2014–present
- Label: Remixed Records
- Members: Thomas Nordin; Simone Glud
- Past members: Jenny Redenkvist; Isabelle Heitman; Camilla Alvestad; Jonas Eriksson; Mattias Eliasson

Solid Base is a Swedish-Norwegian Eurodance duo.

The lead singer in the group was Isabelle Heitmann, who was born in Oslo, Norway in 1972. She had a passion for singing since her childhood, and at the age of 10 she moved to Gothenburg, Sweden. A few years after she had moved to Stockholm, she started to sing in various talent competitions. One day she got a phone call from producer Pat Reiniz asking her to sing for him. She ended up singing for Cool James and Black Teacher on their album. At work, she met a man named Niclas Lindberg who recommended her for the Solid Base project.

Rapper Thomas Nordin or Teo T (born 1971) spent his youth living in places like Saudi Arabia, Africa and Indonesia. Once back in Stockholm, he dedicated his time to the growing music life of Stockholm. Teo met the producers Jonas Eriksson and Mattias Eliasson and together they formed the idea of Solid Base.

In 1994, Solid Base released their first single "Together". They then released several other singles and gained success in Europe. In 1996, their debut album Finally was released. It included hit songs like "Mirror Mirror", "You Never Know" and "Let It All Be Sunshine". Two years later, they released their second album The Take Off where the song "Come'n Get Me" is probably their most well-known. The band's second album, The Take Off, was successful in Japan, being certified gold by the RIAJ in 1998.

The last CD of the 1990s they made was in 1999 with Express. By 2001, Solid Base released the album Party Totale! in Germany. Their last studio album was In Action from 2002. In 2004, The Greatest Hits was released; a Greatest Hits DVD with music videos was also released.
Solid Base returned in 2014 and did a lot of shows around Scandinavia, with Camilla Alvestad as the vocalist.
September 2015, Solid Base released a new single called "Wet" (with Camilla Alvestad)
January 2017, Solid Base released a new single "We're Gonna Rock It!" (Camilla Alvestad)

Later 2017 Camilla Alvestad left and Veronika Färestål joined as new vocalist.
In 2018, Veronika left and Jenny Redenkvist joined as new vocalist.
In 2025 Jenny decided to spend more time with the baby and left the group. Simone Glud joined as new vocalist.

== Discography ==
=== Albums ===
- 1996 – Finally
- 1998 – The Take Off
- 1999 – Express
- 2001 – Party Totale
- 2002 – In Action
- 2002 – Greatest Hits
- 2004 – Greatest Hits (20 tracks, + 9 bonus DVD features)

=== Singles ===
Year	Single	Peak chart positions			Album
Year	Single	FIN	NOR	SWE	Album
1994	"Together"	—	—	—	Finally
1994	"In Your Dreams"	—	—	—	Finally
1995	"Mirror Mirror"	—	6	—	Finally
1995	"Stars in the Night"	—	—	—	Finally
1996	"You Never Know"	12	4	—	Finally
1996	"Let It All Be Sunshine"	13	—	—	Finally
1997	"All My Life"	—	—	—	Finally
1997	"Fly to Be Free"	—	—	—	Finally
1998	"Come'n Get Me"	6	—	—	The Take Off
1998	"Sunny Holiday"	—	—	—	The Take Off
1999	"Ticket to Fly"	—	—	48	The Take Off
1999	"Once You Pop (You Can't Stop)"	—	—	—	Express
1999	"This Is How We Do It"	—	—	—	Express
2000	"Push It"	—	—	53	Express
2000	"Sha La Long"	—	—	—	Express
2000	"Come On Everybody"	—	—	—	Express
2001	"I Like It"	—	—	—	In Action
2015	"Wet"	—	—	—	—N/a
2017	"We're Gonna Rock It"	—	—	—	—N/a
"—" denotes releases that did not chart
