= Breathe =

Breath most often refers to:

- Breathing, to inhale and exhale consecutively, drawing oxygen from the air, through the lungs

Breath may also refer to:

== Books ==
- Breathe, a 2005 novel by Penni Russon
- Breathe: A Ghost Story, a 2006 novel by Cliff McNish
- Breathe: Stories from Cuba, a 2016 short-story collection by Leila Segal
- Breath: The New Science of a Lost Art, a 2020 popular science book by journalist James Nestor
- Breathe (Oates novel), 2021, by Joyce Carol Oates

== Film and television ==
- Breathe (2009 film), a UK film
- Breathe (2014 film), a French film
- Breathe, a 2015 film featuring Kristof Konrad
- Breathe (2017 film), a biographical drama film directed by Andy Serkis
- Breathe (2022 film), a Canadian film directed by Onur Karaman
- Breathe (2024 film), an action thriller film
- "Breathe" (Better Call Saul), a 2018 episode of Better Call Saul
- Breathe (TV series), a 2018 Indian Web series
- Breathe: Into the Shadows (Web Series), a 2020 Indian web series

== Law ==
- BREATHE Act, a U.S. bill proposed in 2020

== Music ==
=== Bands ===
- Breathe (Australian band), Australia, 2010s
- Breathe (British band), UK, 1980s
- Breathe (New Zealand band), New Zealand, 1990s

=== Albums ===
- Breathe (Edmond Leung album), 1996
- Breathe (Faith Hill album), 1999
- Breathe (Keller Williams album), 1999
- Breathe, by Midge Ure, 1996
- Breathe (Midnight Oil album), 1996
- Breathe (Mike Peters album), 1994
- Breathe (Pandora album), 1999
- Breathe (Psychic TV album), 1996
- Breathe (Through Fire album), 2016
- Huminga (Zild album), 2021

=== EPs ===
- Breathe (Birdy EP), by Birdy, 2013
- Breathe, by Diamond Cafe, 2017
- Breathe (Maverick City Music EP), 2022

=== Songs ===
- "Breathe" (Blu Cantrell song), 2002
- "Breathe" (CamelPhat and Cristoph song), 2018
- "Breathe" (Delilah song), 2012
- "Breathe" (Erasure song), 2005
- "Breathe" (Fabolous song), 2004
- "Breathe" (Faith Hill song), 1999
- "Breathe" (Greenwheel song), 2002
- "Breathe" (Jax Jones song), 2017
- "Breathe" (Kaz James song), 2008
- "Breathe" (Kylie Minogue song), 1998
- "Breathe" (Malcolm Todd song), 2026
- "Breathe" (Maverick City Music song), 2021
- "Breathe" (Michelle Branch song), 2003
- "Breathe" (Midge Ure song), 1996
- "Breathe" (Moist song), 1999
- "Breathe" (Nickelback song), 2000
- "Breathe" (Pink Floyd song), 1973
  - "Breathe (Reprise)", a section from "Time" (Pink Floyd song), 1973
- "Breathe" (The Prodigy song), 1996
- "Breathe" (Ricki-Lee Coulter song), 2006
- "Breathe" (Seeb song), 2006
- "Breathe" (Taylor Swift song), 2008
- "Breathe" (Télépopmusik song), 2002
- "Breathe" (U2 song), 2009
- "Breathe" (Vladana song), 2022, represented Montenegro in the Eurovision Song Contest 2022
- "Breathe" (Winterville song), 2006
- "Breathe" (Yeat song), 2024
- "Breathe (2 AM)", by Anna Nalick, 2004
- "3:15 (Breathe)", by Russ, 2021
- "Breathe", by AB6IX, from the EP B Complete, 2019
- "Breathe", by Ad Infinitum, from Chapter II: Legacy, 2021
- "Breathe", by Alexi Murdoch, from Time Without Consequence, 2006
- "Breathe", by Almah, from Almah, 2006
- "Breathe", by Alter Bridge, from The Last Hero, 2016
- "Breathe", by Angels & Airwaves, from I-Empire, 2007
- "Breathe", by Backstreet Boys, from In a World Like This, 2013
- "Breathe", by Backstreet Boys, from DNA, 2019
- "Breathe", by Basement, from Colourmeinkindness, 2012
- "Breathe", by BoDeans, from Still, 2008
- "Breathe", by Bon Jovi, from 100,000,000 Bon Jovi Fans Can't Be Wrong, 2004
- "Breathe", by Coldrain, from The Side Effects, 2019
- "Breathe", by Collective Soul, from Hints Allegations and Things Left Unsaid, 1993
- "Breathe", by The Cult, from Beyond Good and Evil, 2001
- "Breathe", by Dave Gahan, released as a B-side on the single "I Need You", 2003
- "Breathe", by Depeche Mode, from Exciter, 2001
- "Breathe", by Dev, from The Night the Sun Came Up, 2011
- "Breathe", by Diamond Cafe, 2017
- "Breathe", by Disturbed, from Believe, 2002
- "Breathe", by Eric Prydz, from Opus, 2016
- "Breathe", by G-Dragon, from Heartbreaker, 2009
- "Breathe", by Joji and Don Krez, from Head in the Clouds II, 2019
- "Breathe", by Kittie, from Funeral for Yesterday, 2007
- "Breathe", by Lalah Hathaway, from Self Portrait, 2008
- "Breathe", by Lauv, from I Met You When I Was 18 (The Playlist), 2018
- "Breathe", by Lenny Kravitz, 2005
- "Breathe", by Lil Skies, from Shelby, 2019
- "Breathe", by Luna Sea, from Shine, 1998
- "Breathe", by Melissa Etheridge, from Lucky, 2004
- "Breathe", by Michael W. Smith, from Worship, 2001
- "Breathe", by Ministry, from The Mind Is a Terrible Thing to Taste, 1989
- "Breathe", by Miss A, from A Class, 2011
- "Breathe", by Monsta X, from the EP Shape of Love, 2022
- "Breathe", by Nas, from the Untitled Nas album, 2008
- "Breathe", by Newsboys, from Take Me to Your Leader, 1996
- "Breathe", by NF, from Therapy Session, 2016
- "Breathe", by Nonpoint from Vengeance, 2007
- "Breathe", by Rebecca St. James, from Worship God, 2002
- "Breathe", by Roger Waters, from Music from the Body, 1970
- "Breathe", by Roxette, from The Ballad Hits, 2002
- "Breathe", by Ryan Star, from 11:59, 2010
- "Breathe", by Samantha Fox, from Angel with an Attitude, 2005
- "Breathe", by Sugar Ray, from Floored, 1997
- "Breathe", by Swollen Members, from Monsters in the Closet, 2002
- "Breathe", by Taproot, from Welcome, 2002
- "Breathe", by Tara Blaise, from Great Escape, 1998
- "Breathe", by Toploader, from Onka's Big Moka, 2009
- "Breathe", by White Lies, from As I Try Not to Fall Apart, 2022
- "Breathe", by Wolfheart, from Winterborn, 2013
- "Breathe (Respira)", from the musical In the Heights
- "Breathe (Spontaneous)", by Bethel Music, from Starlight, 2017

== See also ==
- "Breathe and Stop", a song by Q-Tip, from Amplified, 1999
- Breath (disambiguation)
- Breathing (disambiguation)
- Breathe Again (disambiguation)
- Exhale (disambiguation)
