= Adore =

Adore may refer to:

== Music ==
=== Albums ===
- Adore (album), a 1998 album by the Smashing Pumpkins
- Adore (EP), a 2015 EP by Jasmine Thompson
- Adore: Christmas Songs of Worship, a 2015 album by Chris Tomlin
- Adore, a 2005 album by Misako Odani

=== Songs ===
- "Adore" (Cashmere Cat song) (2015)
- "Adore" (Prince song) (1987)
- "Adore" (Amy Shark song) (2016)
- "Adore" (Jasmine Thompson song) (2015)
- "Adore", a 2002 song by Maus & Stolle from Radio Caroline Volume 1 by Miss Kittin
- "Adore", a 2004 song by Paco from This Is Where We Live

== Other uses ==
- Adore (film) or Adoration (2013)

== People with the name ==
- Adore Delano (born 1989), American drag queen
- Jett Adore (fl. from 2007), American burlesque dancer

== See also ==
- Adoration (disambiguation)
- Renée Adorée (1898-1933), French actress
- I Adore You (disambiguation)
