= Undressed (disambiguation) =

Undressed is an American anthology series that aired on MTV in the early 2000s.

Undressed may also refer to:

- Undressed (film), a lost 1928 silent film drama
- Undressed (Pansy Division album), 1993
- Undressed (Kim Cesarion album), 2014
  - "Undressed" (Kim Cesarion song), the title track
- "Undressed" (Sombr song), 2025
- Undressed, a reality dating show series that aired on MTV in 2017
- "Undressed", a song by White Town from Women in Technology
- Undressed, a state of being naked
