= Breathing (disambiguation) =

Breathing is the process that moves air in and out of the lungs or oxygen through other breathing organs.

Breathing may also refer to:

- One of two Greek diacritics:
  - Rough breathing, which represents h
  - Smooth breathing, which represents the absence of h
- Breathing, aeration of wine, as by use of a decanter
- Breathing, as a technique for meditation
  - Anapanasati, Buddhist breathing meditation
  - Pranayama, Yoga breathing meditation
- Breathing (lens), an effect in some photographic lenses
- Breathing (noise reduction), an unwanted audible artifact of some noise reduction systems
- Breathing (memorial sculpture), a 2008 memorial sculpture in London
- Breathing (film), a 2011 Austrian art-house film

== Music ==
- Breathing (band), a Chinese rock music band
- "Breathing" (Kate Bush song), 1980
- "Breathing" (Lifehouse song), 2001
- "Breathing" (Bryan Rice song), during the Dansk Melodi Grand Prix 2010
- "Breathing" (Jason Derulo song), 2011
- "Breathing" (Triptykon song), 2014
- "Breathing", a song by Anne-Marie from Therapy
- "Breathing", a song by Emma Bunton from Free Me
- "Breathing", a song by Nightingale from their 2000 album I
- "Breathing", a song by Yellowcard from their 2003 album Ocean Avenue
- "Breathin", a 2018 song by Ariana Grande
- "Breathing", a 2017 "original motion picture soundtrack from a lost film" by Canadian synth-pop duo Electric Youth

== See also ==
- Breath (disambiguation)
- Breathe (disambiguation)
- Exhale (disambiguation)
