= Strongest =

Single by Ina Wroldsen
- Released: 27 October 2017
- Genre: Pop, dance
- Length: 3:27
- Label: Syco Music
- Songwriter(s): Arnthor Birgisson; Ina Wroldsen; Bård Mathias Bonsaksen
- Producer(s): Arnthor

Ina Wroldsen singles chronology
| "St. Peter" (2016) | "Strongest" (2017) | "Breathe" (2017) |

"Strongest" is a song recorded by Norwegian singer and songwriter Ina Wroldsen. The song was released on 27 October 2017 and has peaked at number 2 in Norway.

"Strongest" is Wroldsen's first solo release on Syco Music after signing to the label in June 2017. The track centers its message on the heartbreak of a lost love and moving forward with her son.

In an interview with Charlotte Sissener of Musikknyheter, Wroldsen said the song is about a good friend of hers, saying the situation is "hard and bitter, but also genuine and triumphant."

== Track listing ==
Original
| No. | Title | Length |
|---|---|---|
| 1. | "Strongest" | 3:27 |

Alan Walker remix
| No. | Title | Length |
|---|---|---|
| 1. | "Strongest" | 3:30 |

== Charts ==
=== Weekly charts ===
| Chart (2017–18) | Peak position |
|---|---|
| Denmark (Tracklisten) | 20 |
| Norway (VG-lista) | 2 |
| Romania (Airplay 100) | 16 |
| Romania (Romanian Radio Airplay) | 1 |
| Sweden (Sverigetopplistan) | 85 |

=== Year-end charts ===
| Chart (2018) | Position |
|---|---|
| Denmark (Tracklisten) | 65 |
| Romania (Airplay 100) | 47 |

== Certifications ==
| Region | Certification | Certified units/sales |
|---|---|---|
| Denmark (IFPI Danmark) | Platinum | 90,000^{‡} |
^{‡} Sales+streaming figures based on certification alone.

== Release history ==
| Country | Date | Version | Format | Label | Catalogue | Ref. |
|---|---|---|---|---|---|---|
| Various | 27 October 2017 | Original | Digital download, streaming | Syco Music, Sony Music | 886446811772 | |
| Various | 1 December 2017 | Alan Walker remix | Digital download, streaming | Syco Music, Sony Music | N/A | |
