= Lay It on Me (Ina Wroldsen and Broiler song) =

Single by Ina Wroldsen and Broiler
- Released: 8 April 2016
- Genre: Pop
- Length: 3:47
- Label: Stairs; Universal
- Songwriter(s): Arnthor Birgisson; Christoffer Huse; Ina Wroldsen; Mikkel Christiansen; Simen Auke; Trond Opsahl
- Producer(s): Broiler

Ina Wroldsen singles chronology
"Rebels" (2015)	"Lay It on Me" (2016)	"Places" (2016)

Broiler singles chronology
"Money" (2016)	"Lay It on Me" (2016)	"Daydream" (2016)

Music video
- "Lay It on Me" on YouTube

"Lay It on Me" is a song recorded by Norwegian singer and songwriter Ina Wroldsen and Norwegian record producer duo Broiler. The song was released in April 2016 and has peaked at number 2 in Norway, where it was certified 2× platinum.

== Reception ==
Scandipop said "It's an emotional ballad backed by an equally powerful production which complements the fraught fragility of the top-line beautifully".

== Track listing ==
Original
No.	Title	Length
1.	"Lay It on Me"	3:47

TDK remix
No.	Title	Length
1.	"Lay It on Me"	3:22

Acoustic
No.	Title	Length
1.	"Lay It on Me"	3:50

== Weekly charts ==
Chart (2016)	Peak position
Norway (VG-lista)	2

== Certifications ==
Region	Certification	Certified units/sales
Norway (IFPI Norway)	2× Platinum	80,000^{‡}
^{‡} Sales+streaming figures based on certification alone.

== Release history ==
Country	Date	Version	Format	Label	Ref.
Various	8 April 2016	Original	Digital download, streaming	Stairs Music Co. Universal Music Group	
Various	17 June 2016	TDK remix	Digital download, streaming	Stairs Music Co. Universal Music Group	
Various	20 June 2016	Acoustic	Digital download, streaming	Stairs Music Co. Universal Music Group	
