= Back Home (Westlife album) =

2007 studio album by Westlife

Studio album by Westlife
- Released: 5 November 2007
- Recorded: 2006–2007
- Studio: London, United Kingdom; Stockholm, Sweden; Los Angeles, U.S.
- Genre: Pop; dance-pop; electropop
- Length: 47:29
- Label: Syco; Sony BMG; RCA
- Producer: Arnthor Birgisson; David Kreuger; Steve Mac; Per Magnusson; Quiz & Larossi; Rami Yacoub

Westlife chronology
The Love Album (2006)	Back Home (2007)	Where We Are (2009)

Singles from Back Home
- 1. "Home" Released: 29 October 2007; 2. "Us Against the World" Released: 3 March 2008; 3. "Something Right" Released: 4 April 2008

Back Home

Video by Westlife
- Released: 5 November 2007
- Genre: Pop
- Label: Sony BMG

Westlife chronology
Live at Wembley (2006)	Back Home (2007)

Back Home is the eighth studio album by Irish boy band Westlife, released on 5 November 2007 through Syco Music, Sony Music and RCA Records. The album was produced by Steve Mac, Quiz & Larossi, Per Magnusson, David Kreuger and Rami Yacoub, who also produced some of the group's previous material. Back Home was the group's final album before their temporary break from music in 2008.

The album was preceded by the lead single "Home", a cover version of the Michael Bublé song, which was sent to radio stations in September 2007, and was eventually released as a digital download and CD single on 29 October 2007. Two more singles were released to promote the album, namely "Us Against the World" and "Something Right". A DVD also accompanied the album's release, including some of the group's recent music videos and exclusive footage of the group.

The album was met with mixed reviews, however the album was a commercial success. The album debuted atop the UK Albums Chart, selling 132,000 copies in its first week of release and remained in the top three spots for eight consecutive weeks. It also spent five weeks at number two. One of those weeks have the highest sales for a number two in a week of the year 2007 in the United Kingdom. While in Ireland, this is the third best-selling album of 2007.

Professional ratings
Review scores
Source	Rating
AllMusic	3/5 stars
Channel24	3/5 stars
Daily Express	3/5 stars
Digital Spy	2/5 stars
Entertainment.ie	1/5 stars
Galaxie Magazine Malaysia	3/5 stars
iAfrica	3/5 stars
Rovi	3/5 stars
The Daily	7.5/10 stars
This Is Aberdeen	(favorable)

== Background ==
The track listing for the album was released on the band's official website on 3 October 2007, with track-by-track videos by the band. The release date of the album was brought forward to 5 November 2007 from the initial 12 November 2007. The album contains a collection of brand new tracks along with a few covers. The cover songs on the album are "Have You Ever?", a Diane Warren penned ballad previously recorded by Brandy, and "I'm Already There", a song recorded by Lonestar. The first single from the album is a cover of the ballad "Home", originally by Michael Bublé, and was released on 29 October 2007 The song debuted at number three on the UK Singles Chart. "Us Against the World", an original song dedicated to Westlife fans worldwide, was released as the band's second single on 3 March 2008 in the UK and Ireland. Meanwhile, "Something Right", which is an original up-tempo song, was released as the third single in Asia and Europe.

An accompanying DVD was released on the week of the album's release. It featured backstage footage of the group, Up Close and Personal segments, and the music videos of "Home", "You Raise Me Up", "When You Tell Me That You Love Me", "Amazing" and "The Rose". The DVD was available exclusively at Woolworths. It charted at number one on the UK Visuals Chart and was certified Platinum.

== Track listing ==
No.	Title	Writer(s)	Producer(s)	Length
1.	"Home"	Amy Foster-Gillies, Michael Bublé, Alan Chang	Steve Mac	3:28
2.	"Us Against the World"	Rami, Arnthor Birgisson, Savan Kotecha	Rami & Arnthor	4:02
3.	"Something Right"	Rami, Birgisson, Kotecha	Rami & Arnthor	3:14
4.	"I'm Already There"	Richie McDonald, Gary Baker, Frank J. Myers, David Zippel	Mac, Quiz & Larossi	4:18
5.	"When I'm with You"	Jordan Omley, Michael Mani, Sam Watters, Louis Biancaniello	Biancaniello, Watters	4:12
6.	"Have You Ever"	Diane Warren	Mac	4:33
7.	"It's You"	Steve Mac, Wayne Hector	Mac	4:11
8.	"Catch My Breath"	Mac, Hector	Mac	3:18
9.	"The Easy Way"	Rami, Birgisson, Kotecha	Rami & Arnthor	3:35
10.	"I Do"	Mac, Hector, John Reid	Mac	4:30
11.	"Pictures in My Head"	Rami, Birgisson, Kotecha	Rami & Arnthor	4:17
12.	"You Must Have Had a Broken Heart"	Jörgen Elofsson, Mac, Nicky Chinn	Mac, Per Magnusson, David Kreuger	4:01

Back Home – Japanese edition bonus tracks
No.	Title	Writer(s)	Producer(s)	Length
13.	"Home" (Soul Seekerz Remix Radio Edit)	Foster, Bublé, Chang	Mac, Soul Seekerz	3:36
14.	"Home" (Music Video)			3:28

Back Home – Australian edition bonus DVD: Live at Wembley
No.	Title	Length
1.	"Overture/Flying Without Wings"
2.	"Hit You with the Real Thing"
3.	"When You're Looking Like That"
4.	"Amazing"
5.	"She's Back/Billie Jean"
6.	"Uptown Girl"
7.	"Addicted to Love"
8.	"I Wish/Wild Wild West"
9.	"Senorita/Don't Cha"
10.	"Colour My World"
11.	"Hey Whatever"
12.	"The Dance"
13.	"Swear It Again"
14.	"Seasons in the Sun"
15.	"World of Our Own"
16.	"Mandy"
17.	"Queen of My Heart"
18.	"What Makes a Man"
19.	"You Raise Me Up"
20.	"The Love Album" (Photoshoot)
21.	"You Raise Me Up" (Music Video)
22.	"When You Tell Me That You Love Me" (Music Video)
23.	"Amazing" (Music Video)

Back Home – iTunes Store tour edition bonus tracks
No.	Title	Writer(s)	Producer(s)	Length
13.	"Hard to Say I'm Sorry"	Peter Cetera, David Foster	Mac	3:56
14.	"Get Away"	Mac, Hector	Mac	3:15
15.	"Home" (Soul Seekerz Remix Radio Edit)	Bublé, Chang, Foster	Mac, Soul Seekerz	3:36
16.	"Total Eclipse of the Heart" (Sunset Strippers Remix)	Jim Steinman	Mac, Sunset Strippers	7:42
17.	"I'm Already There" (Ashanti Boyz Remix)	Baker, McDonald, Myers, Zippel	Mac, Quiz & Larossi, Ashanti Boyz	4:16
18.	"Us Against the World" (The Wideboys Remix)	Birgisson, Kotecha, Yacoub	Rami & Arnthor, Wideboys	4:34

== Credits ==
Vocals	:	Nicky Byrne, Kian Egan, Mark Feehily, Shane Filan
Executive Producers	:	Louis Walsh, Simon Cowell, Sonny Takhar, Tim Byrne
Producers	:	Steve Mac, Chris Law, Dan Pursey, Rami Yacoub, Savan Kotecha, Antour, AJ, Anders Johansson, Josef Larossi, David, Jorgen Elofsson, Louis Biancanello, Sam Watters, Michael Mani, Jordan Omley
Photography	:	Nino Munoz
Management	:	Louis Walsh Management

Mixed By	:	Niklas Flyckt (2,3), Quiz (4), Josef Larossi (4), Louis Biancaniello (5), Michael Mani (5), Sam Watters (5), Jordan Omley (5), Ronny Lahti (9), Fredrik Andersson (11,12)
Keyboards & Programming	:	Anders Johansson (4), Quiz (4), Romdhane (4), Josef Larossi (4), Per Magnusson (12), Jorgen Ingestrom (12)
Pro Tools Editing	:	Chris Laws (1,6,7,8,10)
Pro Tools Engineer	:	AJ Junior (2,3,9,11)
Engineered By	:	Chris Laws (1,6,7,8,10), Daniel Pursey (1,6,7,8,10), Quiz (4), Josef Larossi (4), Tim Lewis (5), Fredrik Andersson (12)
Mix Engineered By	:	Ren Swan (1,6,7,8,10)
Strings Engineered By	:	Markus Bergqvist (4), Ren Swan (6,7)
Choir Engineered By	:	Ian Agate (4)
Backing Vocals Arranged By	:	Atlas (4), Emil Heiling (4), Quiz (4), Josef Larossi (4)
Strings Arranged By	:	Dave Arch (1,6,7,8,10), Ulf (4,12), Henrik Janson (4,12)

Guitars	:	John Paracelli (1,8,10), Daniel Pursey (1), Esbjorn Ohrwall (2,3,4,9,11,12), Rami Yacoub (3,9), Paul Gendler (6,7,8), Fridrik 'Frissi' Karlsson (6,10)
Bass	:	Steve Pearce (1,6,7,10), Rami Yacoub (2,3,11), Thomas Lindberg (4)
Piano/Keyboards/Synths/Organ	:	Steve Mac (1,8,10), Dave Arch (1,6,7,10), Peter Ljung (4), Steve Mac (6), Per Magnusson (12), Jorgen Ingestrom (12)
Drums	:	Neal Wilkinson (1), Chris Laws (1,6,8,10), Ian Thomas (7), Magnus Perssom (12)
Strings	:	Stockholm Session Orchestra (4)
Percussion	:	Frank Ricotti (1,7)
Mellotron	:	Steve Mac (7)
Choir	:	The Tuff Session Singers (1)

*Numbers in brackets represents the track number on the album.

== Charts ==
=== Weekly charts ===
Chart (2007)	Peak position
Australian Albums (ARIA)	14
Austrian Albums (Ö3 Austria)	65
Dutch Albums (Album Top 100)	48
European Albums Chart	6
German Albums (Offizielle Top 100)	45
Irish Albums (IRMA)	1
Japanese Albums (Oricon)	50
New Zealand Albums (RMNZ)	12
Norwegian Albums (VG-lista)	18
Scottish Albums (OCC)	1
Swedish Albums (Sverigetopplistan)	33
Swiss Albums (Schweizer Hitparade)	19
Taiwanese Albums (Five Music)	1
UK Albums (OCC)	1

=== Year-end charts ===
Chart (2007)	Position
Irish Albums (IRMA)	3
UK Albums (OCC)	5

== Certifications and sales ==
Region	Certification	Certified units/sales
Ireland (IRMA)	5× Platinum	75,000^{^}
New Zealand (RMNZ)	Gold	7,500^{^}
Sweden (GLF)	Gold	20,000^{^}
United Kingdom (BPI)	3× Platinum	900,000^{^}
Summaries
Europe (IFPI)	Platinum	1,000,000^{*}
^{*} Sales figures based on certification alone.^{^} Shipments figures based on certification alone.

== Release history ==
Country / Region	Date	Format	Label	Catalogue
South Africa	26 October 2007	CD, digital download	RCA, Syco Music, Sony Music	
Ireland	2 November 2007	CD, digital download	RCA, Syco Music, Sony Music	
Netherlands	2 November 2007	CD, digital download	RCA, Syco Music, Sony Music	
Switzerland	2 November 2007	CD, digital download	RCA, Syco Music, Sony Music	88697176702
China	5 November 2007	CD, digital download	RCA, Syco Music, Sony Music	
Hong Kong	5 November 2007	CD, digital download	RCA, Syco Music, Sony Music	88697176702
South Korea	5 November 2007	CD, digital download	RCA, Syco Music, Sony Music	
United Kingdom	5 November 2007	CD, digital download	RCA, Syco Music, Sony Music	
Thailand	6 November 2007	CD, digital download	RCA, Syco Music, Sony Music	
Europe	7 November 2007	CD, digital download	RCA, Syco Music, Sony Music	SME-8869717-6702
Finland	7 November 2007	CD, digital download	RCA, Syco Music, Sony Music	SME-8869717-6702
Norway	7 November 2007	CD, digital download	RCA, Syco Music, Sony Music	SME-8869717-6702
Sweden	7 November 2007	CD, digital download	RCA, Syco Music, Sony Music	SME-8869717-6702
Austria	9 November 2007	CD, digital download	RCA, Syco Music, Sony Music	88697176702
Germany	9 November 2007	CD, digital download	RCA, Syco Music, Sony Music	88697176702
France	21 November 2007	CD, digital download	RCA, Syco Music, Sony Music	
Japan	21 November 2007	CD, digital download	RCA, Syco Music, Sony Music	BVCP21573
Argentina	22 January 2008	CD, digital download	RCA, Syco Music, Sony Music	7176702
Poland	11 February 2008	CD, digital download	RCA, Syco Music, Sony Music	
