= Adorable =

Adorable may refer to:

- Cuteness
- Adorable (band), a British rock band from the 1990s
- Adorable (film), a 1933 American film directed by William Dieterle
- "Adorable" (song), a 1955 song by The Drifters, The Colts, The Fontane Sisters

== See also ==
- Adore (disambiguation)
- Love
