= Breathitt =

Breathitt may refer to:

- Breathitt County, Kentucky, county located in the U.S. state of Kentucky
- Jackson, Kentucky, the seat of Breathitt Co., originally known as Breathitt
- Breathitt Parkway, controlled-access highway from Henderson to Hopkinsville, Kentucky
- Edward T. Breathitt (1924–2003), politician from the US state of Kentucky
- John Breathitt (1786–1834), the 11th Governor of Kentucky

== See also ==
- Breathe (disambiguation)
