= I Love This Life (Kim Cesarion song) =

Single by Kim Cesarion

from the album Undressed
- Released: 21 March 2014
- Recorded: 2013–2014
- Genre: Pop
- Length: 3:51
- Label: Sony Music Entertainment
- Songwriter(s): Arnthor Birgisson; Gary Clark; Kim Cesarion; Lukasz Duchnowski
- Producer(s): Arnthor Birgisson; Gary Clark

Kim Cesarion singles chronology
"Brains Out" (2013)	"I Love This Life" (2014)

"I Love This Life" is a song by Swedish singer-songwriter Kim Cesarion. Written by Cesarion, Lukasz Duchnowski, Arnthor Birgisson and Gary Clark and produced by the latter two, "I Love This Life" was first released on 21 March 2014 as the third single from Cesarion's debut studio album, Undressed (2014).

== Charts ==
Chart performance for "I Love This Life"
Chart (2014)	Peak position
Australia (ARIA)	87
Denmark (Tracklisten)	25
Sweden (Sverigetopplistan)	38
