= Kim Cesarion =

Swedish singer (born 1990)

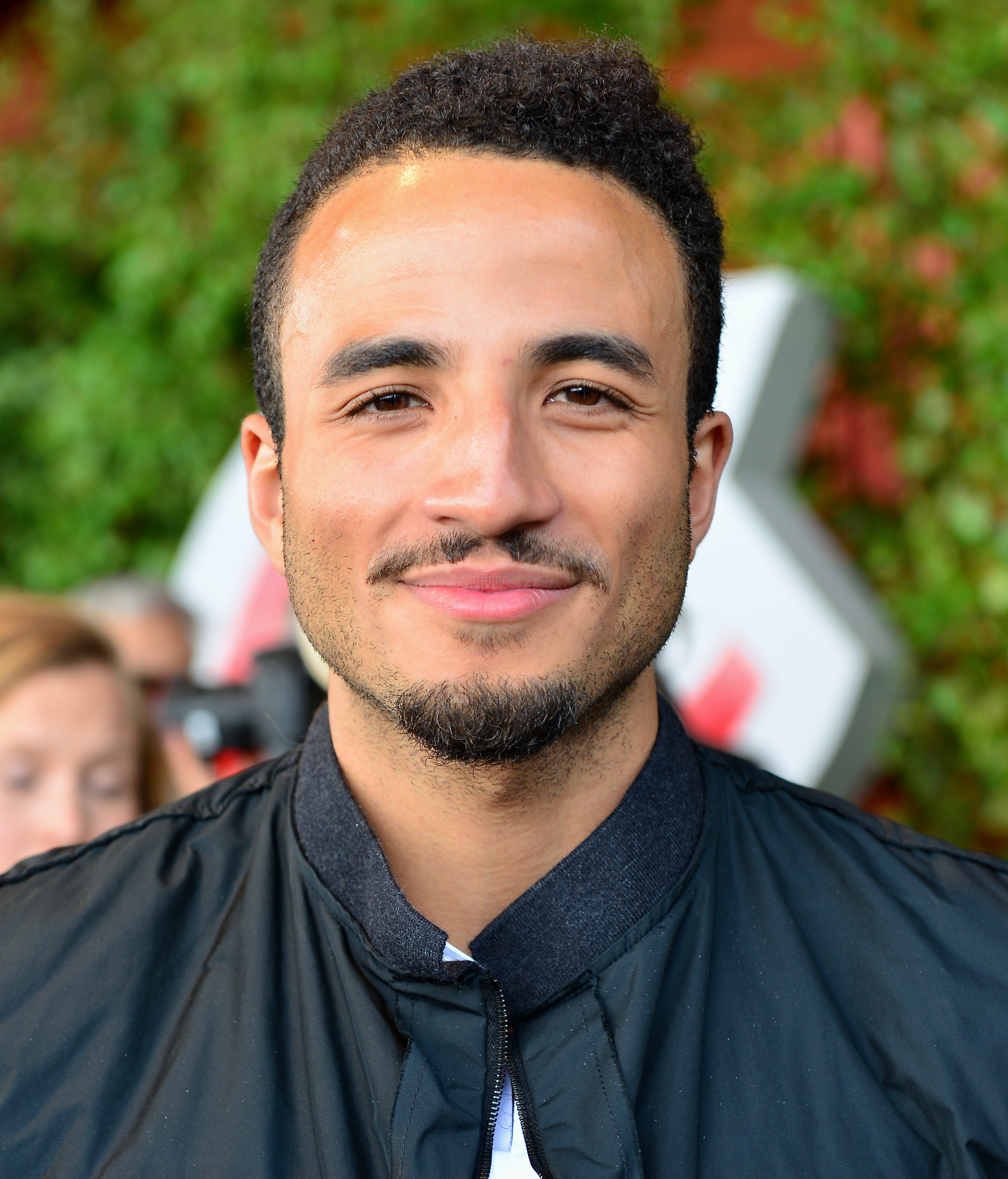
- Kim Cesarion in 2013

Background information
- Born: Kim Leonel Niko Cesarion; 10 July 1990 (age 36); Stockholm, Sweden
- Genres: Soul; R&B
- Occupations: Singer; songwriter; record producer; musician
- Instruments: Vocals; guitar; piano; violin; bass; viola; drums
- Years active: 2011–present
- Labels: RCA; Sony Music; Columbia
- Website: www.kimcesarion.com

Kim Hugo Leonel Niko Cesarion (born 10 July 1990) is a Swedish singer-songwriter of Guadeloupean and Greek origin. Cesarion is a classically trained musician. He studied at Lilla Akademien, a highly acclaimed music school in Stockholm, and plays several instruments including the violin, piano, double bass, and viola, as well as drums. He is signed with RCA, Sony Music and Columbia.

== Career ==
=== 2011–2012: Early beginnings ===
In 2011, Cesarion received a record deal with Aristotracks after meeting Arnthor Birgisson and Linus Andreen. He signed a distribution deal with Sony Music Sweden, whereas RCA UK will distribute his releases in Britain and Columbia Records in the United States).

=== 2013–2023: Breakthrough ===
Cesarion is known for his countertenor, which he uses in his single "Undressed", released on 22 March 2013 and featured in the top 10 in five countries. His second single Brains Out was released on 6 September 2013. His debut album Undressed was co-written by Cesarion with Arnthor Birgisson, Gary Clark and Lukasz "Lukipop" Duchnowski, and released on 6 June 2014.

In 2018 he released the EP Bleed including the song with the same name and the previously released singles "Water", "Call on Me" and "Honest".

In 2020, Ceasrion released a song with Swedish lyrics titled "Plåga mig" that was a project together with producer Theodor Arvidsson Kylin.

=== 2024: Melodifestivalen ===
Cesarion participated in Melodifestivalen 2024 with the song "Take My Breath Away", being eliminated in his heat on 17 February 2024.

== Personal life ==
Cesarion was born in Stockholm to a Guadeloupean father and a Greek Cretan/Swedish mother. Both his father and his uncle were record producers. His sister is also a performer with Kaysha and the Sushiraw label.

== Discography ==
=== Albums ===
List of albums, with selected details and chart positions
Title	Album details	Peak chart positions	
Title	Album details	SWE	AUS
Undressed	Released: 19 June 2014; Label: Aristotracks, RCA, Sony Music; Format: LP, CD, digital download	15	59

=== EPs ===
- Bleed (2018)

=== Singles ===
List of singles, with selected details, chart positions and certifications
Title	Year	Peak chart positions							Certifications	Album
Title	Year	SWE	AUS	DEN	FIN	NOR	NZ	US Bub.	Certifications	Album
"Undressed"	2013	7	5	6	11	13	32	13	GLF: 5× Platinum; ARIA: Platinum; IFPI DEN: Platinum; IFPI NOR: Gold	Undressed
"Brains Out"	2013	—	—	30	—	—	—	—		Undressed
"I Love This Life"	2014	38	87	25	—	—	—	—		Undressed
"Therapy"	2016	74	—	—	—	—	—	—		Non-album single
"Call on Me"	2018	—	—	—	—	—	—	—		Bleed EP
"Water"	2018	—	—	—	—	—	—	—		Bleed EP
"Honest"	2018	—	—	—	—	—	—	—		Bleed EP
"Bleed"	2018	—	—	—	—	—	—	—		Bleed EP
"Show Me" (with Molly Hammar)	2019	—	—	—	—	—	—	—		Non-album singles
"Plåga mig"	2020	—	—	—	—	—	—	—		Non-album singles
"Take My Breath Away"	2024	85	—	—	—	—	—	—		Non-album singles
"—" denotes a single that did not chart or was not released in that territory.
