= Funny (Zedd and Jasmine Thompson song) =

2020 single by Zedd and Jasmine Thompson

Single by Zedd and Jasmine Thompson
- Released: 16 July 2020
- Genre: Dance-pop; futurepop; pop
- Length: 3:41
- Label: Atlantic; Interscope
- Songwriters: Anton Zaslavski; Casey Smith; Jasmine Thompson; Jordan K. Johnson; Marcus Lomax; Michael Pollack; Stefan Johnson
- Producers: The Monsters & Strangerz; Zedd

Zedd singles chronology
"Good Thing" (2019)	"Funny" (2020)	"Inside Out" (2020)

Jasmine Thompson singles chronology
"Love for the Lonely" (2020)	"Funny" (2020)	"Already There" (2021)

Music video
- "Funny" on YouTube

"Funny" is a song by German-Russian music producer Zedd and English singer Jasmine Thompson. The two artists wrote the song with Michael Pollack and Casey Smith, as well as Jordan K. Johnson, Marcus Lomax and Stefan Johnson from the American production and songwriting team The Monsters & Strangerz, who produced the song with Zedd. It was released on 16 July 2020 by Atlantic Records and Interscope Records.

== Background ==
Thompson wrote the song in summer 2019. Since she is based in London, she went to Los Angeles for a weekend to work on the song with her team of producers, The Monsters & Strangerz. Due to the COVID-19 pandemic, she flew back home and did everything online afterwards. The Monsters & Strangerz secretly got in touch with Zedd and provided him with an early demo they produced without Thompson's knowledge. Zedd loved it, produced his version and reached out to her through her manager about the collaboration.

In an interview with Kansas City CBS affiliate KCTV5, Thompson said she initially envisioned that song to be sadder and piano-driven, but once Zedd sent her his version, it instantly won her over. Without the negativity, the track has transformed into a happy, feel-good revenge song. "He really put his own spin on Funny, and made it a much more hopeful song then I had originally understood the song," she said, adding that "the idea of collaborating with him was life-changing".

In a press statement, Zedd said that he was "blown away" when he first heard Thompson's vocals on the song, and immediately knew he wanted to work with her. He praised Thompson for capturing the vast amount of emotion and energy in the song perfectly with her voice. Thompson called the collaboration "an amazing experience", praising Zedd's "unique" approach, which "gave the song an incredible energy, and really brought it to life".

== Release ==
An acoustic version of the song premiered on Thompson's YouTube channel on 14 July 2020. During a Twitter conversation with Billboard Dance, Zedd revealed that he had already finished the song in late February 2020, but he faced difficulty in finding an appropriate time to release the single "given the difficult state the world [was] in". The official stripped version was released on 14 August 2020, while a remix EP was released on 4 September 2020, featuring remixes by Breathe Carolina, Marc Benjamin and Ellis.

== Composition ==
"Funny" is an upbeat dance-pop and pop song about a breakup. It opens with a piano and vocal arpeggiator, accompanied by a clock-ticking effect, a signature feature in Zedd's productions. Thompson's vocals are layered over vocoder effect, which bears a resemblance to past tracks from Zedd such as "The Middle" and "Stay". The drop has been described as futurepop, and features a distorted vocal chop melody and sawtooth synth chords. Lyrically, the track centers on revenge through confidence when an ex-lover reaches out after a breakup.

Thompson spoke of the idea behind the song in a press statement: "After a relationship, people always seem to come back and want to try again and pay you more attention and say they miss you. I had been through a relationship that wasn't working and as soon as we ended it, they wanted to spend more time with me." She said the song is not about a specific ex in particular.

In an interview with Paper, Zedd said that the song was especially challenging to produce since the original chorus was a double chorus. "I usually go with my typical formula that has a chorus, then I have the chorus again, slight variation, then the third time I would have a double chorus, but this song has a double chorus from the get-go." To prevent separating the message of the whole chorus or revealing the message too soon, Zedd made a drop with a hint of lyrics through a vocal chop, while the bridge reveals the full lyrics to the double chorus. In this song, the bridge acts as a climax rather than a space filler. He decided that this was the best approach after he made about 20 versions.

== Music video ==
The music video was released on YouTube on 16 July 2020. The two artists had originally planned to meet in person in Los Angeles to work on the music video. However, due to the onset of the pandemic, Thompson was not able to travel. Instead, they were presented with a new idea for the video which made it especially relevant to the moment. Jasmine Thompson credits the video's director Jack Karaszewski for coming up with the inspiration: "I have to give all of the credit to the director Jack Karaszewski. He came up with the whole idea of making this world of how me and Zedd met. It was really fun, he made the whole video so random and had such great ideas to make it memorable during the quarantine." With no crews or camera operators, the shoot was coordinated through FaceTime.

The music video involves screen recordings of Mac computers running macOS Catalina, and it takes place almost entirely in the Messages app. It opens with Thompson recording herself singing the chorus while playing the piano in Photo Booth, as if she was recording a demo, until she received an iMessage from her ex-boyfriend. She proceeds to type the lyrics into the text field. She subsequently received a message from Zedd, who called her voice "incredible" and wanted to work with her, saying he got her number from Scottish singer-songwriter Lewis Capaldi. At first, she did not believe it, until he sends her a picture, after which she typed: "OMG it is u!". She responded by sending him the demo she recorded earlier, and later joined a Zoom meeting with Zedd and his dogs. Near the end of the video, Capaldi makes a shirtless cameo, lip-syncing to the song while shoving potato chips into his mouth.

== Track listing ==
- Digital download and streaming
1. "Funny" – 3:41
- Digital download and streaming – stripped
1. "Funny" (stripped) – 3:39
- Digital download and streaming – remixes EP
1. "Funny" (Breathe Carolina remix) – 3:21
2. "Funny" (Marc Benjamin remix) – 2:55
3. "Funny" (Ellis remix) – 2:34
4. "Funny" – 3:41

== Credits and personnel ==
Credits adapted from Tidal.

- Zedd – songwriting, production, mixing, programming
- Jasmine Thompson – vocals, songwriting
- Casey Smith – additional vocals, songwriting
- The Monsters & Strangerz – production, guitar, programming
  - Jordan K. Johnson – songwriting
  - Marcus Lomax – songwriting
  - Stefan Johnson – songwriting
- Michael Pollack – songwriting
- Joya Nemley – A&R administration
- Brandon Davis – A&R direction
- Pete Ganbarg – A&R direction
- Gian Stone – vocal production, audio engineering
- Ryan Shanahan – audio engineering
- Mike Marsh – mastering
- Joe Kearns – vocal production

== Charts ==
=== Weekly charts ===
Chart (2020)	Peak position
US Bubbling Under Hot 100 (Billboard)	12
US Adult Pop Airplay (Billboard)	22
US Hot Dance/Electronic Songs (Billboard)	7
US Pop Airplay (Billboard)	33

=== Year-end charts ===
Chart (2020)	Position
US Hot Dance/Electronic Songs (Billboard)	20
Chart (2021)	Position
US Hot Dance/Electronic Songs (Billboard)	74

== Certifications ==
Region	Certification	Certified units/sales
United States (RIAA)	Gold	500,000^{‡}
^{‡} Sales+streaming figures based on certification alone.

== Release history ==
Region	Date	Format	Version	Label	Ref.
Various	16 July 2020	Digital download; streaming	Original	Atlantic; Interscope	
Italy	24 July 2020	Contemporary hit radio	Original	Warner	
Various	14 August 2020	Digital download; streaming	Stripped	Atlantic; Interscope	
Various	4 September 2020	Digital download; streaming	Remixes EP	Atlantic; Interscope	
