= Something Right =

2008 Westlife song

Single by Westlife

from the album Back Home
- Released: April 4, 2008
- Recorded: 2007; Maratone Studios (Stockholm, Sweden)
- Genre: Pop; R&B
- Length: 3:14
- Label: Sony BMG; RCA
- Songwriters: Arnthor Birgisson; Rami Yacoub; Savan Kotecha
- Producers: Arnthor Birgisson; Rami Yacoub

Westlife singles chronology
"Us Against the World" (2008)	"Something Right" (2008)	"What About Now" (2009)

Music video
- "Something Right" on YouTube

"Something Right" is a song by Irish boy band Westlife from their eighth studio album Back Home. The song was released as the band's second single in Asia and Europe following their first single, "Home", as well as the album's overall third single. The song was composed by Rami Yacoub, Savan Kotecha and Arnthor Birgisson. A music video was filmed in December 2007 in London and premiered on March 7, 2008. This single was not released as a single in UK and Ireland.

== Tours performed at ==
- Back Home Tour (2008)

== Background ==
The band's record label, Sony BMG, aimed to increase album promotions and sales through the release of this single, which happens to be a fan favourite. The song was composed by Rami Yacoub, Savan Kotecha and Arnthor Birgisson, who also contributed the songs "Us Against the World", "The Easy Way", and "Pictures In My Head" to the Back Home album.

== Track listing ==
Digital single

1. "Something Right" (Single Mix)
2. "Get Away"

Digital EP

1. "Something Right" (Single Mix)
2. "Something Right" (Instrumental)
3. "Hard to Say I'm Sorry"
4. "Something Right" (Video)

== Music video ==
The music video for "Something Right" began shoot on 17 December 2007, directed by Amber and Brown and was shot in London. It premiered on March 7, 2008 on music channels. The video uses a brand new remix track of the song and was shot using green screen, featuring the band in a desert and subsequently in a futuristic night setting.

== Chart performance ==
Chart performance for "Something Right"
Chart (2008)	Peak position
Australia (ARIA)	92
Czech Republic (Radio Top 100)	83
Finland Airplay (Radiosoittolista)	9
Ireland (IRMA)	43
Sweden (Sverigetopplistan)	46
Switzerland Airplay (Swiss Hitparade)	78
