= Exhale (disambiguation) =

To exhale is to breathe out.

Exhale may also refer to:

- "Exhale (Shoop Shoop)", a 1995 song by Whitney Houston
- "Exhale" (Emina Jahović song), 2008
- "Exhale", a 2001 single by System F and Armin van Buuren
- "Exhale" (Sabrina Carpenter song), 2019
- "Exhalation" (short story), a 2008 short story by Ted Chiang
  - Exhalation: Stories, a 2019 collection of short stories by Ted Chiang
- Exhale (Plumb album), 2015
- Exhale (Thousand Foot Krutch album), 2016
- Exhale (Arthur Blythe album), 2003
- "Exhale", a 2020 single by Kenzie featuring Sia

== See also ==
- Breath (disambiguation)
- Breathe (disambiguation)
- Breathing
