= Adore You =

Adore You may refer to:

- "Adore You" (Miley Cyrus song), 2013
- "Adore You" (Harry Styles song), 2019
- "Adore You" (Jessie Ware song), 2019
- "Adore You", a song by Juice Wrld from The Party Never Ends, 2024
- "Adore You", a song by Maisie Peters from It's Your Bed Babe, It's Your Funeral, 2019
- "Adore U" (Seventeen song), 2015
- "Adore U", a song by Fred Again and Obongjayar, 2023
- "Adore U", a song by Khalid from Sincere, 2024
- "Adore U", a song by Nmixx from Blue Valentine, 2025

== See also ==
- I Adore You (disambiguation)
