= Undressed (Kim Cesarion album) =

Studio album by Kim Cesarion
- Released: 18 June 2014
- Genre: R&B
- Length: 46:51
- Label: Aristotracks; RCA; Sony Music
- Producer: Arnthor Birgisson; Blueprint; Jordan Bratton; Gary Clark; Dreamlab; Kmack; Lukipop; Terrell J Mackey; Ryan Ogren

Kim Cesarion chronology
Undressed (2014)	Bleed (2018)

Singles from Undressed
- 1. "Undressed" Released: 22 March 2013; 2. "Brains Out" Released: 6 September 2013; 3. "I Love This Life" Released: 21 March 2014

Undressed is the debut studio album by Swedish singer-songwriter Kim Cesarion. It was released on 18 June 2014 through Aristotracks, RCA Records, and Sony Music. The first single, "Undressed" was released on 22 March 2013. It became a top ten hit in Australia, Denmark, Luxembourg, and Sweden.

== Promotion ==
Seven promotional singles were released from Undressed through Spotify preceding the album's release: "Can't Love Nobody" on 11 June, "Trade Ya" on 12 June, "Bad Thing" on 13 June, and "Girls" on 14 June, "Angel Wings" on 15 June, "X" on 16 June, and "One True Lover" on 17 June 2014.

== Track listing ==
Undressed track listing
No.	Title	Writer(s)	Producer(s)	Length
1.	"Undressed"	Arnthor Birgisson; Gary Clark; Kim Cesarion; Lukasz Duchnowski	Birgisson; Clark	3:43
2.	"Can't Love Nobody"	Cesarion; Ryan Ogren; Nate Cyphert; Nick Bailey; Keith Varon	Birgisson; Blueprint; Ogren^{[a]}	4:01
3.	"Girls"	Birgisson; Clark; Cesarion; Duchnowski	Birgisson; Clark	3:36
4.	"Bad Thing"	Birgisson; Clark; Cesarion; Ben Stevenson	Birgisson; Clark	2:37
5.	"Angel Wings"	Terrell J Mackey; Jordan Bratton; Alina Baraz; Galimatias	Bratton; Mackey; Kmack	3:34
6.	"X"	Birgisson; Clark; Cesarion; Duchnowski	Birgisson; Clark	3:16
7.	"One True Lover"	Birgisson; Cesarion; Wayne Hector; Clark	Birgisson	3:27
8.	"Brains Out"	Birgisson; Clark; Cesarion; Duchnowski	Birgisson; Clark	3:36
9.	"When U're High"	Birgisson; Clark; Cesarion; Duchnowski	Birgisson; Lukipop	4:32
10.	"I Love This Life"	Birgisson; Clark; Cesarion; Duchnowski	Birgisson; Clark	3:51
11.	"Come Down to Me"	Birgisson; Clark; Cesarion; Duchnowski	Birgisson; Clark	3:23
12.	"Amen"	Birgisson; Clark; Cesarion; Duchnowski	Birgisson; Clark	3:44
13.	"Trade Ya"	Birgisson; Leah Haywood; Cesarion; Daniel James; Joseph Pringle	Birgisson; Dreamlab	3:31
Total length:				46:51

Notes

- ^{^[a]} signifies an additional producer

Sample credits

- "Angel Wings" contains a sample from "Make You Feel" by Alina Baraz & Galimatias.
- "Amen" pastor performed by R.A. Vernon from The Grace Factor.

== Charts ==
Chart performance for Undressed
Chart (2014)	Peak position
Australian Albums (ARIA)	59
Swedish Albums (Sverigetopplistan)	15

== Release history ==
Release history and formats for Undressed
Country	Date	Format	Label
Scandinavia	18 June 2014	CD; digital download	Aristotracks; RCA; Sony Music
Australia	20 June 2014	CD; digital download	Aristotracks; RCA; Sony Music
Belgium	20 June 2014	CD; digital download	Aristotracks; RCA; Sony Music
Netherlands	20 June 2014	CD; digital download	Aristotracks; RCA; Sony Music
New Zealand	20 June 2014	CD; digital download	Aristotracks; RCA; Sony Music
Greece	23 June 2014	CD; digital download	Aristotracks; RCA; Sony Music
Italy	24 June 2014	CD; digital download	Aristotracks; RCA; Sony Music
Mexico	24 June 2014	CD; digital download	Aristotracks; RCA; Sony Music
Austria	27 June 2014	CD; digital download	Aristotracks; RCA; Sony Music
Germany	27 June 2014	CD; digital download	Aristotracks; RCA; Sony Music
Switzerland	27 June 2014	CD; digital download	Aristotracks; RCA; Sony Music
