= Places (Martin Solveig song) =

Single by Martin Solveig featuring Ina Wroldsen
- Released: 25 November 2016
- Genre: Future house
- Length: 3:22
- Label: Spinnin'; Virgin EMI
- Songwriters: Ina Wroldsen; Martin Picandet
- Producer: Martin Solveig

Martin Solveig singles chronology
| "Do It Right" (2016) | "Places" (2016) | "All Stars" (2017) |

Ina Wroldsen single singles chronology
| "Lay It on Me" (2016) | "Places" (2016) | "Mary's Story" (2016) |

Music video
- "Places" on YouTube

"Places" is a song by French DJ and record producer Martin Solveig featuring vocals from Norwegian singer and songwriter Ina Wroldsen. It was released as a digital download in France on 25 November 2016 through Spinnin' Records and Big Beat. The song has peaked at number 82 on the French Singles Chart. The song was written by Wroldsen and Solveig.

The song samples the Boy Meets Girl song "Waiting for a Star to Fall".

== Music video ==
A music video to accompany the release of "Places" was first released onto YouTube on 7 December 2016 at a total length of four minutes and fourteen seconds.

== Track listing ==
Digital download
| No. | Title | Length |
|---|---|---|
| 1. | "Places" (featuring Ina Wroldsen) | 3:22 |

== Charts ==
=== Weekly charts ===
| Chart (2016–17) | Peak position |
|---|---|
| Austria (Ö3 Austria Top 40) | 72 |
| Belgium (Ultratop 50 Flanders) | 43 |
| Belgium (Ultratop 50 Wallonia) | 24 |
| Czech Republic Airplay (ČNS IFPI) | 96 |
| Czech Republic Singles Digital (ČNS IFPI) | 91 |
| France (SNEP) | 56 |
| Germany (GfK) | 44 |
| Ireland (IRMA) | 37 |
| Netherlands (Single Tip) | 26 |
| Norway (VG-lista) | 39 |
| Scottish Singles Sales (Official Charts) | 12 |
| Slovakia Singles Digital (ČNS IFPI) | 93 |
| UK Singles (Official Charts) | 27 |
| US Hot Dance/Electronic Songs (Billboard) | 48 |

=== Year-end charts ===
| Chart (2017) | Position |
|---|---|
| Belgium (Ultratop Wallonia) | 87 |
| Latvia Airplay (LaIPA) | 57 |
| UK Singles (Official Charts Company) | 53 |

== Certifications ==
| Region | Certification | Certified units/sales |
|---|---|---|
| France (SNEP) | Platinum | 200,000^{‡} |
| Germany (BVMI) | Gold | 200,000^{‡} |
| Italy (FIMI) | Gold | 25,000^{‡} |
| New Zealand (RMNZ) | Gold | 15,000^{‡} |
| United Kingdom (BPI) | 2× Platinum | 1,200,000^{‡} |
^{‡} Sales+streaming figures based on certification alone.

== Release history ==
| Region | Date | Format | Label | Ref. |
|---|---|---|---|---|
| France | 25 November 2016 | Digital download | Spinnin' Records; Big Beat | |
