= Us Against the World (Westlife song) =

Single by Westlife

from the album Back Home
- Released: 3 March 2008
- Recorded: 2007; Maratone Studios (Stockholm, Sweden)
- Genre: Pop
- Length: 4:01
- Label: Sony BMG
- Songwriters: Arnthor Birgisson; Rami Yacoub; Savan Kotecha
- Producers: Arnthor Birgisson; Rami Yacoub

Westlife singles chronology
"Home" (2007)	"Us Against the World" (2008)	"Something Right" (2008)

Music video
- "Us Against the World" on YouTube

Us Against The World CD2
- The cover resembles The Sun and Daily Mirror

"Us Against the World" is a song by Irish boy band Westlife from their eighth studio album Back Home (2007). The song was released as the album's second single on 3 March 2008.

The song was written by Arnthor Birgisson, Rami Yacoub and Savan Kotecha. A music video for the song was filmed in December 2007 and premiered on 14 February 2008.

== Background ==
The song was composed by Arnthor Birgisson, Rami Yacoub and Savan Kotecha, who also co-wrote numerous tracks on the Back Home album, namely "Something Right", "The Easy Way", and "Pictures in My Head". The single was officially confirmed by band member Nicky Byrne during an X Factor interview, which later appeared on the band's official website. "Us Against the World" was also dedicated to Westlife's fans worldwide to mark their continuous support. The band gave their first live performance of "Us Against The World" on the TV special "The Westlife Show – Live", which was broadcast on 15 December 2007. In the Philippines, both the song and music video premiered on 3 July 2008, the band's anniversary date.

== Critical reception ==
Digital Spy's Alex Fletcher rated the album and said: "Westlife have claimed that 'Us Against the World' is the best track on their recent Back Home album, so, if nothing else, we should be grateful that the record company chose to release this rather than one of the tracks the soppy Irish warblers weren't as impressed with."

== Chart performance ==
In the UK, the song debuted at number 40 on digital download sales alone prior to its physical release and peaked at number eight two weeks later on 3 March 2008. The song peaked at number two on Scottish Singles Chart and number six on the Irish Singles Chart. This was the first time in Westlife's history that a single had missed the top five in Ireland and the UK.

== Music video ==
The band announced through their official website that the video began shooting on 4 December 2007. The music video marks a major milestone in the band's decade of music. The video premiered on 14 February, while the single was released on 3 March 2008. The initial video, which featured both the lads and their loved ones, was shot at the Twickenham Stadium in London over a two-day span. Louis Walsh, the band's manager, had a cameo role in it. However, the band had a reshoot of the music video due to Simon Cowell's disapproval of the initial video outcome. This might have caused the release date to be pushed back to 3 March from the initial date of 25 February. The video shows the band walking through a staged red carpet segment, inside the backseat of a moving car, spending time with their loved ones along with photos and videos of their past decade. Noticeably absent from the video though is Mark's then partner Kevin. No explanation was ever offered as to why he was not included in the final video. Former Westlife member Brian McFadden appears in archive footage.

== Track listing ==
UK CD1

1. "Us Against the World" (Single Mix)
2. "Get Away"

UK CD2

1. "Us Against the World" (Single Mix)
2. "I'm Already There" (Ashanti Boyz Remix)
3. "Us Against the World" (The Wideboys Remix Radio Edit)

== Charts ==
=== Weekly charts ===
Chart (2008)	Peak position
Ireland (IRMA)	6
Ireland Download (GfK Chart-Track)	16
Scotland Singles (OCC)	2
UK Singles (OCC)	8
UK Airplay (Music Week)	24
UK Physical Singles (Official Charts Company)	2

=== Year-end charts ===
Chart (2008)	Position
UK Singles (Official Charts Company)	184

== Sales ==
Chart	Count
United Kingdom (OCC) (First week only)	15,128
