= Northern Light (Ask Embla album) =

Studio album by Ask Embla
- Released: May 6, 2013
- Genre: Electropop; folktronica
- Label: Eccentric; Sony; Stairs (deluxe only)
- Producer: Arnthor Birgisson

Singles from Northern Light
- 1. "Father's Eyes" Released: 2012; 2. "Cry Baby" Released: 2012

Scandinavian electropop-folktronica duo Ask Embla, consisting of Icelandic Arnthor Birgisson (as producer and songwriter) and Norwegian Ina Wroldsen (as singer and songwriter), released its studio album, Northern Light, in 2013. It followed two singles and two music video.

== Track listing ==
No.	Title	Length
1.	"Father's Eyes"	4:13
2.	"Legion"	3:51
3.	"I Fell in Love"	2:55
4.	"Cry Baby"	3:48
5.	"Winter"	4:08
6.	"Writings on the Wall"	3:48
7.	"Crashing Down"	4:16
8.	"Wires"	4:19
9.	"Einn"	4:02
10.	"Northern Light (Ida's Dans)"	3:58
11.	"September"	4:13
12.	"The Haunting"	3:34
13.	"Grave"	3:12
14.	"Children"	1:59
15.	"We Are Young" (Fun cover)	3:52
16.	"Father's Eyes" (acoustic)	3:29
Total length:		59:11

== Singles ==
Title	Year	Peak chart positions	Album
Title	Year	NOR	Album
"Father's Eyes"	2012	8	Northern Light
"Cry Baby"	2012	10	Northern Light

== Music videos ==
Title	Year	Director(s)	Ref.
"Father's Eyes"	2013	Pål Laukli	
