= Ina Wroldsen =

Norwegian singer and songwriter (born 1984)

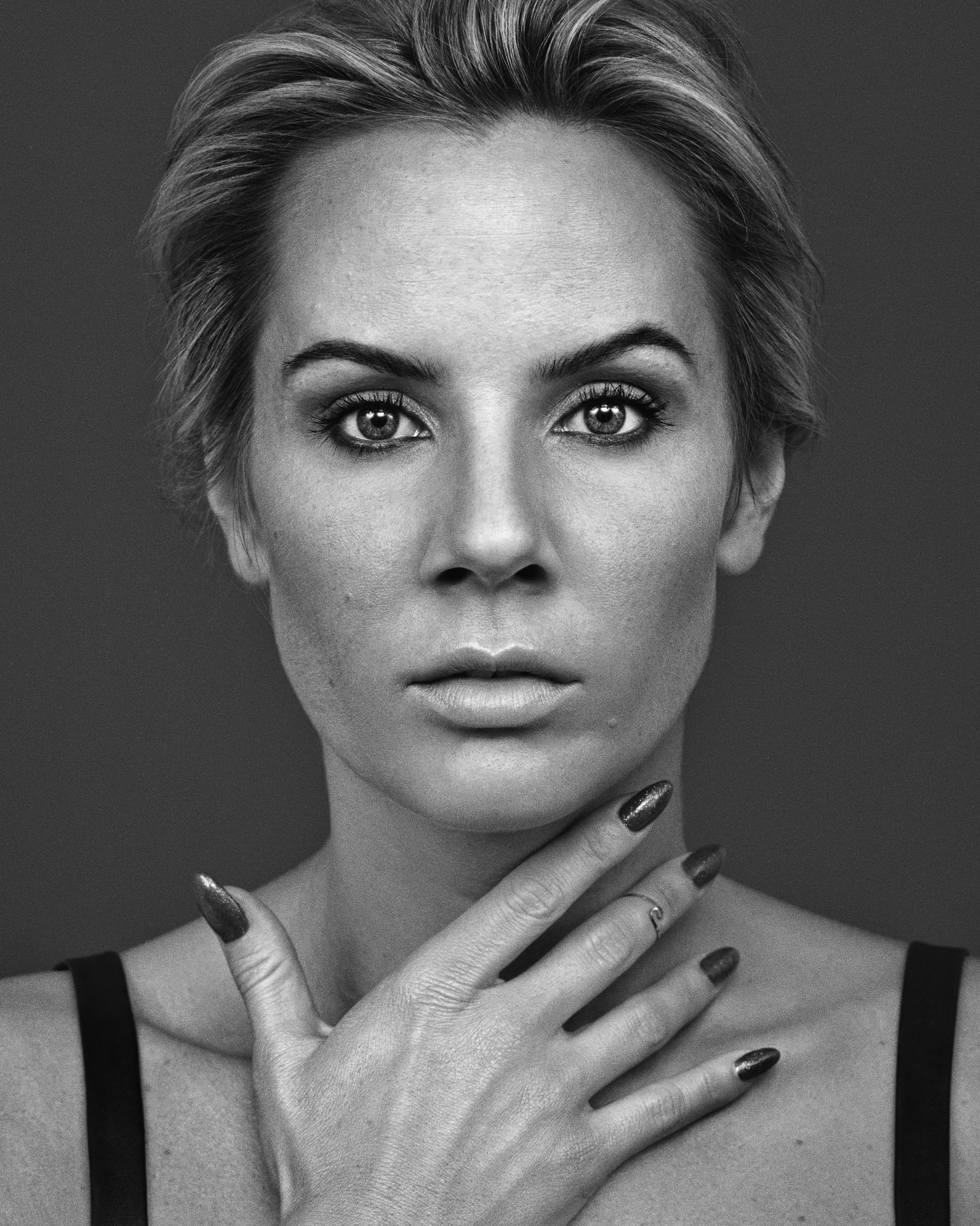
- Wroldsen in 2015
- Born: Ina Christine Wroldsen; 29 May 1984 (age 42); Finnsnes, Norway
- Other names: Ask Embla; Ina
- Occupations: Singer; songwriter
- Years active: 2004–present
- Spouse: Mark Ellwood (m. 2012)
- Children: 1
- Musical career
- Genres: Electropop; folktronica; house
- Label: Syco
- Website: ina-wroldsen.com

Ina Christine Wroldsen (Norwegian: [ˈîːnɑ krɪsˈtìːnɛ ˈʋrɔ̀ɫsn̩]; born 29 May 1984), previously known simply as Ina, is a Norwegian singer and songwriter. She was a part of the electropop duo Ask Embla with Icelandic producer and songwriter Arnthor Birgisson.

== Career ==
Wroldsen's career started solely as a recording artist, but soon turned to writing music for others. As a songwriter, she has had great success and is internationally considered one of the most sought after in her field. She has won several BMI/ASCAP awards for her work, among BRIT award and Spellemannprisen nominations. Her songs have been used by the likes of Shakira, Kylie Minogue, David Guetta, The Saturdays, James Arthur, Britney Spears, Demi Lovato, Madison Beer and Tinie Tempah.

Between 2013 and 2018, the publishing interest of Ina Wroldsen's catalog was represented by Reverb Music/Reservoir Media Management. Since 2018, Warner Chappell Music have represented her publishing interests.

In recent years, Ina has also resumed her career as a recording artist. As part of Norwegian-Icelandic duo Ask Embla, with Arnthor Birgisson, they released the album Northern Lights in 2013 in Norway. She has since continued her artist career under its own name. She released "Aliens (Her er jeg)" (2014), "Rebels" (2015) and "Lay It on Me" (2016). The latter was released as a collaboration with the Norwegian producer duo Broiler and climbed to No. 2 on the VG-lista singles chart.

In 2015, Calvin Harris and Disciples chose to release Ina's song "How Deep Is Your Love" using her vocals.

In 2016, she was one of the judges in the Norwegian version of Idol: Jakten på en superstjerne. She has been the featured vocalist on various worldwide acclaimed DJs' records, including Sigma, Steve Aoki, "Breathe" by Jax Jones and the Martin Solveig song "Places".

In June 2017, she signed a record deal with Simon Cowell's Syco Music label. Soon after, on 27 October 2017, she released her single "Strongest", which was quite successful in Norway, Denmark, and Sweden, and thanks to it in 2019 she was nominated for Spellemannprisen for the "Song of the Year" award.

In August 2018, she released in partnership with Alok "Favela" with her own vocals and inspired from a documentary about Latin American women.

From 2021 to 2024, Wroldsen served as a coach on The Voice Norway, winning its 2022 season with her act Jørgen Dahl Moe.

== Discography ==
=== Studio albums ===
Title	Details	Peak chart positions
Title	Details	NOR
The Business of Christmas	Released: 21 November 2025; Label: Stairs, Sony Music; Format: Digital download, streaming	15

=== Extended plays ===
Title	Details	Peak chart positions
Title	Details	NOR
Hex	Released: 29 June 2018; Label: Syco; Format: Digital download	—
Matters of the Mind	Released: 28 May 2021; Label: Sony Music Entertainment Norway; Format: Digital download, streaming	—
Hver Gang Vi Møtes 2025	Released: 21 February 2025; Label: Sony Music Entertainment Norway; Format: Digital download, streaming	11

=== Charted singles ===
==== As main artist ====
Title	Year	Peak chart positions			Album
Title	Year	NOR	DEN	SWE	Album
"Lay It on Me" (with Broiler)	2016	2	—	—	Non-album singles
"Mary's Story"	2016	79	—	—	Non-album singles
"Strongest"	2017	2	20	85	Non-album singles
"Mother"	2018	17	—	—	Hex
"Favela" (with Alok)	2018	28	—	—	Non-album singles
"Obsessed" (with Dynoro)	2019	13	—	—	Non-album singles
"Body Parts"	2019	26	—	—	Non-album singles
"Haloes"	2019	25	—	—	Non-album singles
"Aldri" (with Stig Brenner)	2023	16	—	—	Non-album singles
"Barcelona" (with Alan Walker)	2024	19	—	— (Note: "Barcelona" did not enter the Swedish Singellista Chart, but peaked at number 17 on the Swedish Heatseeker Chart.)	Walkerworld 2.0
"Stranger (Främling)"	2024	10	—	—	Hver Gang Vi Møtes 2025
"One Day You'll Dance for Me, New York City"	2025	23	—	—	Hver Gang Vi Møtes 2025
"Running Out"	2025	19	—	—	Hver Gang Vi Møtes 2025
"Tada"	2025	18	—	—	Hver Gang Vi Møtes 2025
"—" denotes a recording that did not chart or was not released.

==== As featured artist ====
Title	Year	Peak chart positions									Certifications	Album/EP
Title	Year	NOR	AUT	BEL (Fl)	BEL (Wa)	FRA	GER	IRE	SCO	UK	Certifications	Album/EP
"We Stand Up" (Kat Krazy featuring Ina Wroldsen)	2016	—	—	—	—	—	—	—	—	—		Non-album singles
"Places" (Martin Solveig featuring Ina Wroldsen)	2016	39	72	43	24	56	44	37	12	27	BPI: 2× Platinum; SNEP: Gold	Non-album singles
"Breathe" (Jax Jones featuring Ina Wroldsen)	2017	—	14	14	6	—	15	4	5	7	BEA: Gold; BPI: Platinum; BVMI: Platinum; ARIA: Plarinum	Snacks
"Lie to Me" (Steve Aoki featuring Ina Wroldsen)	2018	—	—	—	—	—	—	—	—	—		Neon Future III
"I Feel Ya" (Cheat Codes with Danny Quest & Ina Wroldsen)	2019	—	—	—	—	—	—	—	—	—		Level 2
"—" denotes a single that did not chart or was not released in that territory.

=== Other songs ===
Title	Year	Album/EP
"If You Could Only See Me" (as Ina)	2004	Non-album singles
"Sorry" (as Ina)	2005	Non-album singles
"Human" (Chris Loco featuring Ina Wroldsen)	2015	See No Evil
"Feels Like Home" (Sigma featuring Ina Wroldsen)	2015	Life

== Credits ==
=== Singing-songwriting ===
Title	Co-writers	Year	Peak chart positions										Certifications	Album
Title	Co-writers	Year	NOR	AUS	AUT	BEL (Fl)	GER	ITA	NL	SWI	UK	US	Certifications	Album
"How Deep Is Your Love" (Calvin Harris and Disciples)	Calvin Harris, Nathan Duvall, Gavin Koolmon, Luke McDermott, Marvin White	2015	9	1	5	1	4	10	2	4	2	27	ARIA: 4× Platinum; IFPI AUT: Gold; BEA: Platinum; BVMI: Platinum; FIMI: 3× Platinum; RMNZ: 2× Platinum; GLF: Platinum; BPI: Platinum; ZPAV: Platinum; RIAA: Platinum	Non-album single

=== Songwriting ===
Year	Artist	Album	Song	Co-writers
2024	Kylie Minogue	Tension II	"Lights Camera Action”	Kylie Minogue, Lewis Thompson
2024	Kylie Minogue	Tension II	"Taboo”	Steve Mac
2024	Kylie Minogue	Tension II	"Hello”	Punctual, Neave Applebaum
2024	Kylie Minogue featuring Bebe Rexha and Tove Lo	Tension II	“My Oh My”	Steve Mac, Tove Lo
2023	Kylie Minogue	Tension	"Padam Padam”	Peter Rycroft
2020	Jax Jones feat. Au/Ra	TBA	"I Miss U"	Janee Bennett, Cass Lowe, Olav Tronsmoen, Timucin Lam
2020	Yves V feat. Alida	TBA	"Home Now"	A. Garpesrad Peck, J Hazell, OHYES, R. Kappmeier, S. Halldin, S. Lappessen, T. Alisson, Y. Van Geertsom
2020	Baard	TBA	"Thinking"	Bard Bonsaksen, Sivert Hjeltes Hagtvet, Vilde Johannessen, Viljat Losnegard
2019	Jack Wins feat. Amy Grace	TBA	"Forever Young"	Julia Karlsson, Anton Rundberg
2019	Nathan Dawe featuring Melissa Steel	TBA	"Repeat After Me"	Diztortion
2019	Baard	TBA	"You Keep Calling"	Bard Bonsaksen, Sivert Hjeltes Hagtvet
2018	Sean Paul and David Guetta featuring Becky G	Mad Love the Prequel	"Mad Love"	Diztortion, David Guetta, Sean Paul, Giorgio Tuinfort, Soaky, Emily Warren, Shakira, Jack Patterson
2018	Anne-Marie	Speak Your Mind	"Breathing Fire"	Steve Mac
2017	Anne-Marie	Speak Your Mind	"Then"	Steve Mac
2017	Disciples	TBA	"Jealousy"	Nathan Duvhall, Luke McDermott, Gavin Koolman
2017	Clean Bandit featuring Zara Larsson	What Is Love? & So Good	"Symphony"	Steve Mac, Ammar Malik, Jack Patterson
2017	Steps	Tears on the Dancefloor	"You Make Me Whole"	Wayne Hector, Ben Kohn, Tom Barnes and Pete Kelleher
2017	Steps	Tears on the Dancefloor	"Happy"	Steve Mac
2017	Steps	Tears on the Dancefloor	"Firefly"	Steve Mac
2017	Rag'n'Bone Man	Human	"Ego"	Rag'n'Bone Man, Two Inch Punch
2017	Tinie Tempah featuring Tinashe	Youth	"Text From Your Ex"	Jax Jones, Tinie Tempah
2016	Clean Bandit featuring Sean Paul and Anne-Marie	What Is Love?	"Rockabye"	Steve Mac, Ammar Malik, Sean Paul, Jack Patterson
2016	Anne-Marie	Speak Your Mind	"Alarm"	Steve Mac, Wayne Hector, Anne-Marie Nicholson
2016	Sofia Carson	TBA	"Love Is the Name"	Steve Mac, Ewald Pfleger, Günter Grasmuck, Peter Niklas, Gruber Herwig Tremschnig, Kurt Plisnier
2016	Anna Naklab	Whole	"Whole"	TMS, Wayne Hector
2016	Olly Murs	24 Hrs	"Flaws"	Steve Robson, Olly Murs, Coffee Jr.
2016	Olly Murs	24 Hrs	"Better Without You"	Steve Robson, Olly Murs, Coffee Jr.
2016	Olly Murs	24 Hrs	"That Girl"	Steve Robson, Olly Murs, Coffee Jr.
2015
2015	Demi Lovato	Confident	"Lionheart"	Steve Mac
2015	Jess Glynne	I Cry When I Laugh	"Hold My Hand"	Jess Glynne, Jack Patterson, Jin Jin
2015	Jasmine Thompson	Adore	"Adore"	Steve Mac, Paul Gendler
2015	Fleur East	Love, Sax and Flashbacks	"Like That"	Fraser T Smith, Fleur East
2015	Ann Sophie	Silver Into Gold	"I Believed"	Steve Mac
2014	Adelén	—N/a	"Always On My Mind"	Andreas Romdhane, Josef Larossi
2014	Adelén	One Love, One Rhythm – The 2014 FIFA World Cup Official Album	"Olé"	Andreas Romdhane, Josef Larossi
2014	Girls' Generation-TTS	Holler	"Adrenaline"	Lucas Secon, Mich Hansen, Jonas Jeberg
2014	BoA	Who's Back?	"Close To Me"	—N/a
2014	Maude Harcheb	#HoldUp	"Hold Up"	Mich Hansen, Jonas Jeberg
2014	Baby Blue	Bump	"Bump"	Andreas Romdhane, Josef Larossi
2014	Cher Lloyd	Sorry I'm Late	"Bind Your Love"	Rami Yacoub, Carl Falk, Shellback
2014	Cher Lloyd	Sorry I'm Late	"Sirens"	Rami Yacoub, Carl Falk
2014	Sanna Nielsen	7	"Breathe"	David Kreuger, Per Magnusson
2014	Sanna Nielsen	7	"Rainbow"	David Kreuger, Per Magnusson
2014	Professor Green featuring Tori Kelly	Growing Up In Public	"Lullaby"	Chris Loco, Stephen Manderson
2014	Aneta Sablik	The One	"You Make Me Whole"	Tom Barnes, Ben Kohn, Peter Kelleher, Wayne Hector, James Reynolds
2014	Shakira	Shakira	"Empire"	Steve Mac
2014	Ben Dettinger	—N/a	"Travelling South"	Arnthor Birgisson
2013	Adelén	—N/a	"Bombo"	Andreas Romdhane, Josef Larossi
2013	Adelén	—N/a	"Baila Conmigo"	Andreas Romdhane, Josef Larossi
2013	James Arthur	James Arthur	"Recovery"	Tiago Carvalho, James Arthur
2013	Cover Drive	—N/a	"All My Love"	Andreas Romdhane, Josef Larossi, Karen Reifer, Thomas-Ray Armstrong, Jamar Harding
2013	Rebecca Ferguson	Freedom	"My Best"	Tom Barnes, Ben Kohn, Peter Kelleher, Rebecca Ferguson
2013	Inna	Party Never Ends	"In Your Eyes"	Steve Mac
2013	Inna	Party Never Ends	"We Like to Party"	Wayne Hector
2013	Inna	Party Never Ends	"J'Adore"	Inna, Sebastian Barac, Marcel Botezan, Radu Bolfea
2013	Inna	Party Never Ends	"Dame tu amor" featuring Reik (Spanish version)	—N/a
2013	Inna	Party Never Ends	"Light It Up" featuring Reik (English version)	—N/a
2013	Madison Beer	—N/a	"Melodies"	Tom Barnes, Ben Kohn, Peter Kelleher
2013	Wanessa	DNA Tour – Ao Vivo	"Messiah"	Andreas Romdhane, Josef Larossi
2013	Wanessa	DNA Tour – Ao Vivo	"Shine It On"	Andreas Romdhane, Josef Larossi
2012	Cover Drive	Bajan Style	"Twilight"	Andreas Romdhane, Josef Larossi, Karen Reifer, Thomas-Ray Armstrong, Jamar Harding
2012	Cover Drive	Bajan Style	"That Girl"	Steve Mac
2012	Tone Damli	—N/a	"Look Back"	David Eriksen
2012	One Direction	One Thing – Single	"I Should Have Kissed You"	Steve Robson
2012	Leona Lewis	Glassheart	"Come Alive"	Fraser T Smith
2012	James Arthur	James Arthur	"Impossible"	Arnthor Birgisson
2012	Mandy Capristo	Grace	"Hurricane"	David Eriksen
2012	JLS	Evolution	"I Like It"	Andreas Romdhane, Josef Larossi, Aston Merrygold, Jonathan Gill, Marvin Humes, Oritsé Williams
2012	Little Mix	DNA	"We Are Who We Are"	Steve Mac, Wayne Hector
2012	The Wanted	The Word of Mouth	"I Found You"	Steve Mac, Wayne Hector
2011	Cobra Starship featuring Sabi	Night Shades	"You Make Me Feel..."	Steve Mac
2011	Dionne Bromfield	Good for the Soul	"A Little Love"	Bromfield, Andreas Romdhane, Josef Larossi
2011	Sophie Ellis-Bextor	Make a Scene	"Synchronised"	Fred Ball
2011	Melanie C	The Sea	"Weak"	Jez Ashurst, Melanie C
2011	The Saturdays	On Your Radar	"Notorious"	Steve Mac
2011	The Saturdays	On Your Radar	"Faster"	Steve Mac
2011	The Saturdays	On Your Radar	"My Heart Takes Over"	Steve Mac
2011	The Saturdays	On Your Radar	"White Lies"	Carl Falk, Rami Yacoub
2011	Britney Spears	Femme Fatale (Deluxe Edition)	"He About to Lose Me"	Rodney Jerkins
2010	Alexandra Burke	Overcome (Deluxe Edition)	"Before The Rain"	Steve Mac
2010	Tone Damli	Cocool	"I Love You"	—N/a
2010	Leona Lewis	I Got You – Single	"Heartbeat"	Arnthor Birgisson, Leona Lewis
2010	N-Dubz	Love.Live.Life	"Scream My Name"	N-Dubz, B. Reckless, N. Walka, M. Gousse, Z. Anderson
2010	N-Dubz	Love.Live.Life	"Love Sick"	P. Ighile, K. Abrahams, D. Warde
2010	The Saturdays	Headlines!	"Higher"	Arnthor Birgisson
2010	The Saturdays	Headlines!	"Karma"	Steve Mac
2010	Shontelle	No Gravity	"Impossible"	Arnthor Birgisson
2010	Tinchy Stryder featuring Alexis Jordan	Third Strike	"Together"	Kwasi Danquar, Fraser T Smith
2010	Voe	—N/a	"Don't Talk to Me"	David Eriksen, Thomas Eriksen
2009	Natalie Bassingthwaighte	1000 Stars	"Not For You"	Chris Braide
2009	Natalie Bassingthwaighte	1000 Stars	"Turn The Lights On"	Chris Braide
2009	Tone Damli	I Know	"Here I Am (You Got Me)"	—N/a
2009	Jade Ewen	—N/a	"My Man"	—N/a
2009	Sarah Kreuz	One Moment In Time	"Broken Ground"	—N/a
2009	Leona Lewis	Echo	"My Hands"	Arnthor Birgisson
2009	Pixie Lott	Turn It Up	"Gravity"	Jonas Jeberg, Mich Hansen, Lucas Secon
2009	The Saturdays	Wordshaker	"Ego"	Steve Mac, Rhys Barker
2009	The Saturdays	Wordshaker	"No One"	David Eriksen, Thomas Eriksen
2009	The Saturdays	Wordshaker	"One Shot"	David Kreuger, Per Magnusson
2009	The Saturdays	Wordshaker	"Wordshaker"	David Eriksen
2009	The Saturdays	Wordshaker	"Denial"	Chris Braide
2009	The Saturdays	Wordshaker	"Open Up"	David Kreuger, Per Magnusson
2009	The Saturdays	Wordshaker	"Not Good Enough"	Andreas Romdhane, Josef Larossi
2009	The Saturdays	Wordshaker	"Deeper"	Una Healy, Mollie King, Frankie Sandford, Vanessa White, Rochelle Wiseman
2009	The Saturdays	Wordshaker	"2 AM"	Andreas Romdhane, Josef Larossi
2008	Pussycat Dolls	Doll Domination	"Hush Hush; Hush Hush"	Andreas Romdhane, Josef Larossi, Nicole Scherzinger
2008	The Saturdays	Chasing Lights	"If This Is Love"	Vince Clarke, Alison Moyet, Joe Belmaati, Mich Hansen, John *Reid, Remee
2008	The Saturdays	Chasing Lights	"Up"	Andreas Romdhane, Josef Larossi
2008	The Saturdays	Chasing Lights	"Keep Her"	David Eriksen, Thomas Eriksen
2008	The Saturdays	Chasing Lights	"Lies"	David Eriksen, Thomas Eriksen
2008	The Saturdays	Chasing Lights	"Work"	Harry Sommerdahl, Kalle Engström
2008	The Saturdays	Chasing Lights	"Chasing Lights"	Chris Braide
2008	The Saturdays	Chasing Lights	"Set Me Off"	David Eriksen, Thomas Eriksen
2008	The Saturdays	Chasing Lights	"Fall"	Andre Lindal
2007	Maria Arredondo	For a Moment	"If You Could Only See Me"	—N/a

== Awards and nominations ==
Year	Organization	Award	Work	Result	Ref.
2018	WDM Radio Awards	Best Electronic Vocalist	Ina Wroldsen	Nominated	
2018	Spellemannprisen '17	Årets internasjonale suksess (International Success of the Year)	Ina Wroldsen	Won	
2018	P3 Gull	P3-Prisen (P3 Prize)	Ina Wroldsen	Won	
2019	Brit Awards	British Video of the Year	"Breathe" (Jax Jones featuring Ina Wroldsen)	Nominated	
2019	Spellemannprisen '18	Årets låtskriver (Songwriter of the Year)	HEX; Ina Wroldsen	Won	
2019	Spellemannprisen '18	Årets tekstforfatter (Lyricist of the Year)	HEX; Ina Wroldsen	Nominated	
2019	Spellemannprisen '18	Årets låt (Song of the Year)	"Strongest"	Nominated	
2019	64th Ivor Novello Awards	PRS for Music Most Performed Work	"Breathe" (Jax Jones featuring Ina Wroldsen)	Nominated	
