= Brains Out =

Single by Kim Cesarion
- Released: 6 September 2013
- Recorded: 2012
- Genre: Pop
- Length: 3:49
- Label: Aristotracks; Sony Music Entertainment
- Songwriter(s): Kim Cesarion; Arnthor Birgisson; Gary Clark; Lukasz Duchnowski
- Producer(s): Arnthor Birgisson; Gary Clark

Kim Cesarion singles chronology
"Undressed" (2013)	"Brains Out" (2013)	"I Love This Life" (2014)

"Brains Out" is a single of the Swedish singer songwriter Kim Cesarion. The single was released as the second single from his debut studio album in Sweden on 6 September 2013. The song peaked at number 30 on the Danish Singles Chart. "Brains Out" was written by Cesarion, Arnthor Birgisson, Gary Clark, and Lukasz Duchnowski, and it was produced by Birgisson with co-production handled by Clark.

== Charts ==
Chart performance for "Brains Out"
Chart (2013)	Peak position
Denmark (Tracklisten)	30

== Release history ==
Release history and formats for "Brains Out"
Region	Date	Format	Label
Sweden	6 September 2013	Digital download	Aristotracks, Sony Music Entertainment
