= 3:15 (Breathe) =

2021 single by Russ

Single by Russ
- Released: May 21, 2021
- Genre: R&B; hip hop
- Length: 3:04
- Label: Russ My Way
- Songwriters: Russell Vitale; Will Clarke; Uzoechi Emenike; Timucin Lam; Ina Wroldsen
- Producer: Russ

Russ singles chronology
"Status" (2021)	"3:15 (Breathe)" (2021)	"Private" (2021)

Music video
- "3:15 (Breathe)" on YouTube

"3:15 (Breathe)" is a single by American rapper Russ, released on May 21, 2021, and produced by Russ himself. It contains a sample of "Breathe" by Jax Jones featuring Ina Wroldsen.

== Composition ==
The song is built around a sample of Ina Wroldsen's vocals on "Breathe". It features two verses from Russ, who focuses on the troubles in his relationship, including his partner's issues, and acknowledges his own flaws.

== Music video ==
An official music video was released on September 30, 2021. It was co-directed by Edgar Esteves and Joshua Valle. As of February 2024, it has amassed over 30 million views on YouTube.

== Charts ==
Chart performance for "3:15 (Breathe)"
Chart (2021)	Peak position
New Zealand Hot Singles (RMNZ)	11

== Certifications ==
Certifications for "3:15 (Breathe)"
Region	Certification	Certified units/sales
Denmark (IFPI Danmark)	Gold	45,000^{‡}
New Zealand (RMNZ)	2× Platinum	60,000^{‡}
United Kingdom (BPI)	Silver	200,000^{‡}
United States (RIAA)	Platinum	1,000,000^{‡}
Streaming
Greece (IFPI Greece)	Gold	1,000,000^{†}
^{‡} Sales+streaming figures based on certification alone.^{†} Streaming-only figures based on certification alone.
