= Emilia de Poret =

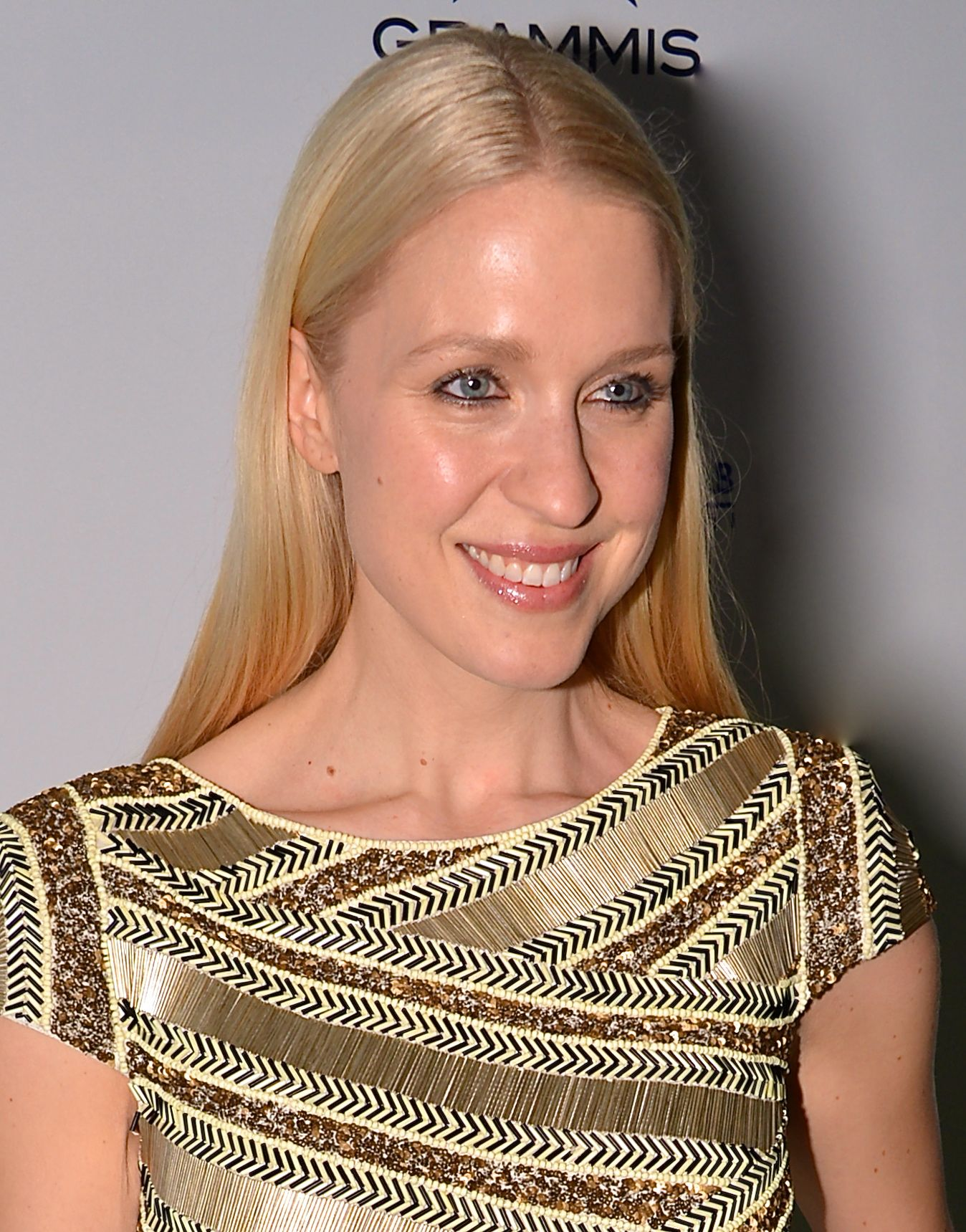
- Emilia de Poret at the Swedish Grammis awards in 2013.

Background information
- Born: Emilia Andreen; 10 August 1976 (age 49); Luleå, Sweden
- Occupations: Singer, Designer, Fashion editor
- Years active: 2001–present

Emilia de Poret, née Andreen (born 10 August 1976), is a Swedish singer, fashion designer and editor.

== Career ==
She made her debut under the name Lia Andreen in the summer of 2001 with the music single "Mistreat Me (You'll Be Sorry)", from the album “Back were I belong” which peaked at number 34 on the Swedish music single chart. Her second album “A lifetime in a moment” peaked at number 20 in the Swedish album chart.

“Pick Me Up” was the title of de Porets third music album, during the summer of 2008 the music single with the same name placed number one of the Swedish singles chart and sold triple platina. During 2008 and 2009 she placed in the charts in Australia and Spain.

Richard Vissions remix of “Pick me Up” was released in 2009 and charted in the American Billboard charts Dance chart. And peaked at place 25. In 2010 the song “This ain’t a love song” was released in Japan and Australia.

After 2010, de Poret has focused on fashion and design, and started working with Liberty of London, and her prints became a part of the collection "Liberty Rocks". She has also been an editor for ELLE Magazine in Sweden.

She has along with her friend Ebba von Sydow written the book Säker stil, they also has a style-pod broadcast together.

== Personal life ==
Emilia de Poret is married to the Swiss attorney Amaury de Poret. The couple have two children together.

== Discography ==
=== Studio albums ===
List of studio albums, with selected chart positions
Title	Details	Peak chart positions
Title	Details	SWE
A Lifetime in a Moment	Released: 2005; Label: Universal Music Group; Formats: CD, digital download	20
Pick Me Up	Released: 2009; Label: Universal Music Group; Formats: CD, digital download	—
"—" denotes a release that did not chart or was not released in that territory.

=== Singles ===
List of singles, with selected chart positions and certifications
Title	Year	Peak chart positions			Certifications	Album
Title	Year	SWE	SPA	US Dance Club	Certifications	Album
"Mistreat Me (You'll Be Sorry)" (as Lia Andreen)	2001	34	—	—		Non-album singles
"Back Where I Belong" (as Lia Andreen)	2001	—	—	—		Non-album singles
"The Moment I Heard Your Voice"	2005	—	—	—		A Lifetime in a Moment
"Pick Me Up"	2008	1	24	25	GLF: 3× Platinum	Pick Me Up
"I Can"	2008	—	—	—		Pick Me Up
"Now or Never"	2009	—	—	—		Pick Me Up
"On Fire"	2009	—	—	—		Pick Me Up
"This Ain't a Love Song" (featuring Verbal)	2010	—	—	—		Pick Me Up
"Weightless"	2011	—	—	—		Pick Me Up
"—" denotes a recording that did not chart or was not released in that territory.

== Bibliography ==
- 2015 - Säker stil (with Ebba von Sydow)
- 2017 - Säker stil - 101 stiltips (with Ebba von Sydow)
