= I Adore You =

I Adore You may refer to:

== Film ==
- I Adore You (film), a 1933 lost British film

== Music ==
=== Albums ===
- I Adore You, or the title song, by Daniël Sahuleka, 1993
- I Adore You, by Sahar Taha, 2012

=== Songs ===
- "I Adore You" (Hugel, Topic and Arash song), 2024
- "I Adore You" (Queenadreena song), 2000
- "I Adore U", by Adore Delano, 2014
- "I Adore You", by Action Bronson from Blue Chips 2, 2013
- "I Adore You", by Air Supply, 2015
- "I Adore You", by Alek Sandar, 2015
- "I Adore You", by Caron Wheeler from Beach of the War Goddess, 1993
- "I Adore You", by Doro Pesch from Calling the Wild, 2000
- "I Adore You", by Esperanza Spalding from Esperanza, 2008
- "I Adore You", by Goldie from The Journey Man, 2017
- "I Adore You", by Jill Scott from Golden Moments, 2015
- "I Adore You", by Melpo Mene from Bring the Lions Out, 2008
- "I Adore You", by Patti Page from Love After Midnight, 1964
- "I Adore You", by Phil Joel, 2002
- "I Adore You", by Phil Wickham from Phil Wickham, 2006
- "I Adore You", by Tone Lōc from Cool Hand Lōc, 1991
- "I Adore You", from the film Aladdin, 1958

== See also ==
- Adore You (disambiguation)
- "Adoro" (song), a 1967 Spanish song by Armando Manzanero
