= Adore (EP) =

EP by Jasmine Thompson
- Released: September 18, 2015
- Length: 17:32
- Label: Atlantic
- Producer: Steve Mac; Craven J; Jesse Shatkin; Kinetics & One Love; Jake Gosling

Jasmine Thompson chronology
Take Cover (2014)	Adore (2015)

Singles from Adore
- 1. "Adore" Released: June 12, 2015; 2. "Do It Now" Released: 2015

Adore is the third extended play (EP) and debut major-label release by English singer and songwriter Jasmine Thompson. It was released on 18 September 2015 by Atlantic Records. Adore serves as Thompson's first release after signing to the label earlier that year.

== Background ==
In an interview with The Huffington Post's Mike Ragogna, Thompson stated that most of the songs on the EP have a love theme, along with topics of trust and not being afraid of failure.

== Track listing ==
No.	Title	Writer(s)	Producer(s)	Length
1.	"Adore"	Ina Wroldsen; Paul Gendler; Steve Mac	Mac	3:07
2.	"Great Escape"	Joshua Grant; Emma Davidson	Craven J	3:27
3.	"Crystal Heart"	Fransisca Hall; Jesse Shatkin	Shatkin	3:24
4.	"Do It Now"	Jeremy Dussolliet; Tim Sommers	Kinetics & One Love	4:05
5.	"Let Myself Try"	Amy Wadge; Jake Gosling	Gosling	3:27
Total length:				17:32
