= Breathe Again (disambiguation) =

"Breathe Again" is a 1993 song by Toni Braxton from the album Toni Braxton.

Breathe Again may also refer to:

- Breathe Again: Toni Braxton at Her Best
- Breathe Again (Danny Fernandes album), 2013
- Breathe Again (Spoken album), 2015
- "Breathe Again" (Pop Evil song), 2020
- "Breathe Again", by Alter Bridge, from the album AB III, 2010
- "Breathe Again", by Sara Bareilles, from the album Kaleidoscope Heart, 2010
- "Breathe Again", by Blitzers, from Check-In, 2021

== See also ==
- "I Breathe Again", a 1999 song by Adam Rickitt
