= Breathe (Oates novel) =

2021 novel by Joyce Carol Oates

- First edition
- Author: Joyce Carol Oates
- Language: English
- Publisher: Ecco Press
- Publication date: 2021
- Publication place: United States
- Media type: Print (hardback)
- Pages: 365
- ISBN: 978-0-06-308547-3

Breathe is a novel by Joyce Carol Oates published in 2021 by Ecco Press.

== Contents ==
Part I: The Vigil
1. A Voice Out of a Fever Cloud
2. The Vigil
3. Post-Mortem
4. Time-Out-of-Time
5. Unthinkable
6. A Rare Parasite
7. The Man Who Never Dreams
8. Respite
9. Wait
10. Spinoza
11. Bed of Serpents
12. The Vigil II
13. Urgent Care
14. Respite II
15. Secret Cache
16. A Theory Pre-Post-Mortem
17. Lonely Wife
18. "Please Let Us Help You"
19. The Vigil III
20. The Experiment
21. Orpheus, Eurydice
22. The Vigil: Night
23. Prosopagnosia
24. Hospice/Honeymoon
25. The Unbearable
26. Canceled
27. "Good News"
28. Breathe
29. Death Certificate
Part II: Post-Mortem
30. The Wound
31. Post-Mortem
32. "Widow"
33. Skli
34. Grief-Vise
35. Chapel of Chimes
36. The Instructions
37. Hylpe Mi Plz Hylppe Mie
38. Voice Mail Message!
39. "No One Can Reach Him"
40. Missing
41. Seven Pounds, Two Ounces
42. Café Luz de la Luna
43. Clinic
44. Grief Counselor
45. Demon-Goddess
46. Blindsight
47. Dawn
48. The Good Widow
49. "Save Yourself" 50. The Examination
51. "Take Me Home"
52. The Lonely
53. Revelation in the Form of a Dove
54. "Thank You for Changing My Life"
55. Half-Life
56. The Adulteress
57. The Approach
58. Bell Tower at San Gabriel
59. Rio de Piedras
60. The Departure
61. A Voice Out of a Fever Cloud

== Reception ==
Calling the novel "an allegory of grief," New York Times critic Joshua Henkin writes:

Oates isn't interested in exploring [Michaela's] marriage. She's interested in grief in real time...a moving meditation, where there is no beginning, no end, and "each hour, each day, passes with excruciating slowness yet it is all happening very quickly."

Henkin adds: "Oates lands the book's wonderful ending...both surprising and inevitable." Library Journal reviewer Christine DeZelar-Tiedman writes:

Oates has dedicated the novel to her late husband, Charlie Gross, who passed away in 2019. While the characters here are decades younger than Oates and Gross, one can speculate that she drew upon her own grief in crafting this novel, which is gut-wrenching and devoid of sentimentality. Oates doesn't pander to the reader and leaves Michaela's duality open to interpretation.

Mark Athitakis at The Washington Post observes: "Oates makes Michaela cartoonish in the novel's latter stages. No rationality can reach her.... In its best moments, Breathe shows how that makes a kind of sense; so many relationships are made of the stories we tell each other. But it's also a novel that falls in love with its portrait of paranoia–and that's not a healthy relationship for anybody."

== Sources ==
- Athitakis, Mark. 2021. "Joyce Carol Oates captures the wobbly reality of widowhood in Breathe." Washington Post, August 23, 2021. https://www.washingtonpost.com/entertainment/books/joyce-carol-oates-captures-the-wobbly-reality-of-widowhood-in-breathe/2021/08/06/959902ae-e570-11eb-8aa5-5662858b696e_story.html Accessed 25 March 2025.
- DeZelar-Tiedman, Christine. 2021. "Breathe" Library Journal, July 23, 2021. https://www.libraryjournal.com/review/breathe-1784301 Accessed 23 March 2025.
- Henkin, Joshua. 2021. "Joyce Carol Oates Explores the Cruel Course of Grief" New York Times, August 3, 2021. https://www.nytimes.com/2021/08/03/books/review/breathe-joyce-carol-oates.html Accessed 20 March 2025.
- Oates, Joyce Carol. 2021. Breathe. Ecco Press, New York. ISBN 978-0-06-308547-3
