= Diamond Cafe =

- Born: Tristan Thompson; 22 May 1998 (age 28)
- Origin: Victoria, British Columbia, Canada
- Genres: Soul, Synth-Pop, R&B
- Years active: 2017–present
- Label: Independent
- Website: diamond.cafe

Tristan Thompson (born May 22, 1998), known as Diamond Cafe, is a recording artist from Victoria, British Columbia. While critics cite his style as a "blend of synth-pop and R&B", Thompson describes his music as "bathing in a cloud of honey on a very foggy night". He has released two mid-length EPs, and one full-length album.

== History ==
=== Career ===
As the current Diamond Cafe, Thompson released his first EP, Breathe, in September 2017 to favorable reviews. Diamond Cafe has since released an additional self-titled EP, as well as a considerable library of singles. In 2023 he released Diamond Cuts, an album of re-mastered singles. He signed to Warner Music Canada in 2023. (https://ca.billboard.com/music/pop/victoria-funk-artist-diamond-cafe-signs-to-warner-music-canada)

== Discography ==
=== Extended plays ===
List of extended plays, with year released
Title	Album details
Breathe	Released: September 11, 2017; Label: Self Released; Formats: digital download, streaming, Cassette
Diamond Cafe (EP)	Released: June 14, 2019; Label: Self Released; Formats: digital download, streaming
Say You Will	Released: September 26, 2021; Label: Self Released; Formats: digital download, streaming
Diamond Cuts	Released: August 31, 2023; Label: Self Released; Formats: digital download, streaming

=== Singles ===
- "Nothing Looks The Same In The Light" (18 June 2018)
- "The Way You Used To Love Me" (24 November 2018)
- "Look Up 2 Love" (6 September 2019)
- "On N On" (13 November 2019)
- "What I Want The Most" (19 March 2020)
- "Good Enough" (1 April 2020)
- "Not Sorry" (18 November 2020)
- "Whatever It May Be" (25 May 2021)
- "Don't Regret (feat. Chuck Inglish)" (27 August 2021)
- "Only Us" (29 November 2021)
- "When You Can't Resist" (January 29, 2024)
- "Slowly Fading" (April 05, 2024)
- “No Wonder” - April 10, 2026
