= Adore (Jasmine Thompson song) =

Single by Jasmine Thompson

from the album Adore
- Released: 12 June 2015
- Length: 3:07
- Label: Atlantic
- Songwriters: Steve Mac; Paul Gendler; Ina Wroldsen
- Producer: Steve Mac

Jasmine Thompson singles chronology
"Unfinished Sympathy" (2015)	"Adore" (2015)	"Do it Now" (2015)

"Adore" is a song recorded by English singer and songwriter Jasmine Thompson for her third extended play of the same name (2015). The track was made available for digital download on 12 June 2015, through Atlantic Records. "Adore" was written by Steve Mac, Paul Gendler and Ina Wroldsen, while production was handled by Mac alone. The track peaked within the top 50 in both Italy and Belgium, ranking at number 34 and 41, respectively. Furthermore, the song has also charted at number 91 on the German Singles Chart. The recording gained major popularity in Italy, where it was certified Platinum by the Federation of the Italian Music Industry for exceeding sales of 50,000 copies.

== Music video ==
The accompanying music video for "Adore" was released on 12 June 2015, on Thompson's YouTube channel. It is three minutes and thirteen seconds long.

== Track listing ==
Digital download
No.	Title	Length
1.	"Adore"	3:07
2.	"Adore" (Acoustic)	3:34

== Charts and certifications ==
=== Weekly charts ===
Chart (2015–16)	Peak position
Belgium (Ultratip Bubbling Under Flanders)	41
Czech Republic Airplay (ČNS IFPI)	31
Germany (Official German Charts)	91
Hungary (Rádiós Top 40)	10
Hungary (Single Top 40)	23
Italy (FIMI)	34
Netherlands (Dutch Top 40)	35
Poland Airplay (ZPAV)	4
Switzerland (Schweizer Hitparade)	39

=== Year-end charts ===
Chart (2015)	Position
Hungary (Rádiós Top 40)	53

=== Certifications ===
Region	Certification	Certified units/sales
Italy (FIMI)	Platinum	50,000^{‡}
Poland (ZPAV)	Gold	10,000^{‡}
^{‡} Sales+streaming figures based on certification alone.

== Release history ==
Region	Date	Format	Label
United Kingdom	12 June 2015	Digital download	Atlantic Records
