= Jasmine Thompson =

English singer (born 2000)

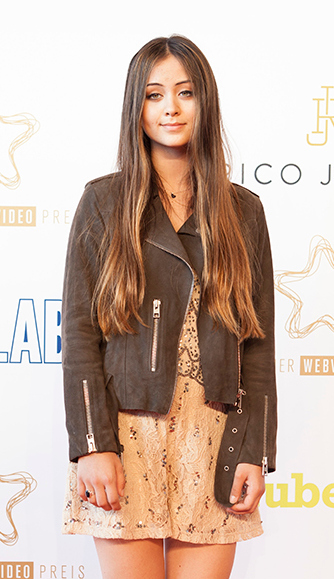
- Thompson in 2015

Background information
- Born: Jasmine Ying Thompson; 8 November 2000 (age 25); London, England
- Genres: Pop; teen pop; dance-pop; R&B
- Occupations: Musician; singer; songwriter
- Instruments: Vocals; piano; guitar
- Years active: 2010–present
- Label: Atlantic
- Website: www.jasminethompsonmusic.com

Jasmine Ying Thompson (born 8 November 2000) is an English singer and songwriter. She began her career at the age of ten by filming herself singing and uploading the videos to YouTube. In 2014, she was featured on German deep house producer Robin Schulz's song "Sun Goes Down", which charted within the top 10 in multiple countries including Australia, Germany, Austria, and Switzerland.

Her acoustic cover version of Chaka Khan's original "Ain't Nobody" reached number 32 on the UK Singles Chart in 2013; this success led to the song being featured in an advertisement by Sainsbury's. The remixed version from Thompson was then remixed again by DJ Felix Jaehn—as "Ain't Nobody (Loves Me Better)"—in 2015 and became a huge hit, peaking at number two in the UK, and charting in several other countries. Her voice has been described as "eerie", "soft", and "enchanting".

== Early life ==
Jasmine Ying Thompson was born on 8 November 2000 in London, to an English father and a Chinese mother. Her parents divorced when she was very young, a life-changing event that attracted her to music and in 2017 inspired her second EP, Wonderland. Thompson has an older brother, named Jed.

== Career ==
=== 2013: Bundle of Tantrums ===
In July 2013, Thompson self-released a cover of Naughty Boy's single "La La La". In August, she released three different covers: a cover of Taylor Swift's "Everything Has Changed" (as a duet with Gerald Ko), a cover of Passenger's "Let Her Go", and a cover of David Guetta's "Titanium". In September the same year, she self-released her debut album Bundle of Tantrums, which included the singles "La La La", "Let Her Go", and "Titanium".

In September 2013, Thompson released a cover of Chaka Khan's "Ain't Nobody". The song featured in an advert for UK supermarket chain Sainsbury's for their by Sainsbury's range. The song has peaked at number thirty-two on the UK Singles Chart. In October 2013, she released the extended play Under the Willow Tree. One of the songs, named "Run", enjoyed moderate success in Europe and the United States.

=== 2014: Another Bundle of Tantrums ===
On 20 April 2014, Thompson released her second album, Another Bundle of Tantrums. The album peaked at number 126 on the UK Albums Chart. In September 2014, Thompson's cover of "Everybody Hurts" was used in the BBC autumn trailer for EastEnders. The trailer showed characters Kat Moon, Sharon Watts, and Linda Carter repeating Thompson's lyrics. Jasmine also released a cover of Clean Bandit's song "Rather Be" on 13 April 2014.

=== 2015–2016: Adore EP ===
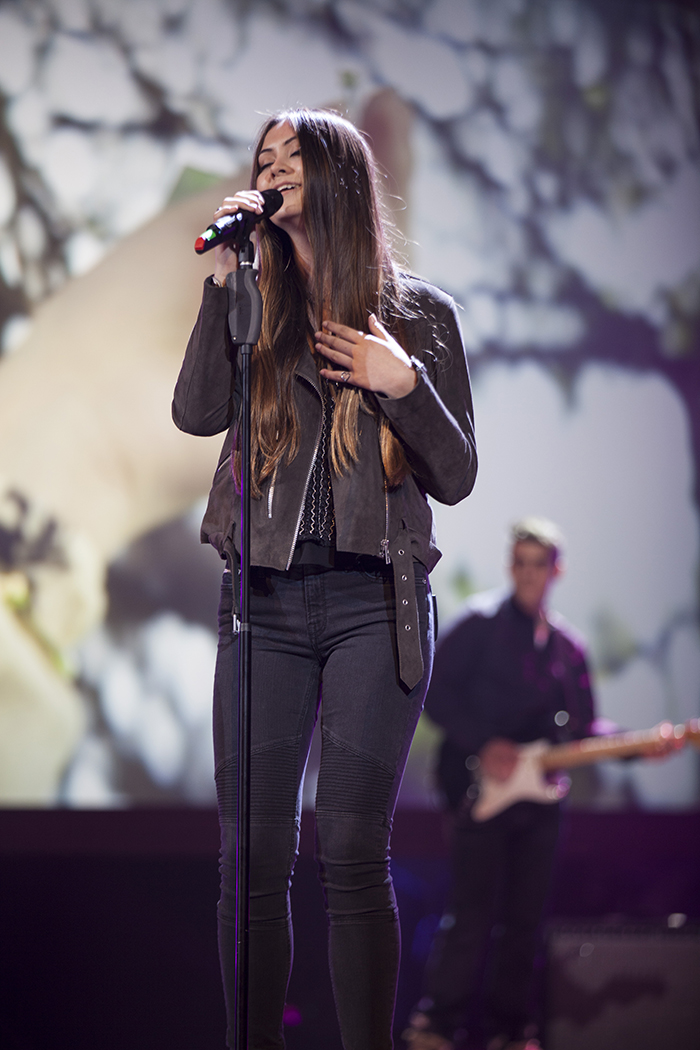
Thompson performing in 2015

On 12 June 2015, Thompson released her first single on Atlantic Records's label, entitled "Adore". Later that year, on 18 September, Thompson released her third extended play, Adore. It included 5 songs: "Adore", "Do It Now", "Great Escape", "Let Myself Try", and "Crystal Heart".

In 2015, German music producer and DJ Felix Jaehn released a remix of "Ain't Nobody", originally released by Thompson in 2013 titled "Ain't Nobody (Loves Me Better)". The song became a worldwide hit, topping the charts in Austria, Germany, Hungary, Israel, and the Netherlands, and peaking within the top ten of the charts in Belgium, Denmark, Finland, France, Romania, Sweden, and Switzerland.

In 2016, her cover of "Mad World" was used in the trailer for Ewan McGregor's film American Pastoral. In the same year, her cover of "Mad World" was also used in the French movie Ares. It is played at the end of the movie leading to the credits.

=== 2017: Wonderland EP ===
On 19 May 2017, Thompson released her fourth extended play, Wonderland.

=== 2019: Colour EP ===
On 29 March 2019, Thompson released her fifth extended play, Colour.

=== 2020: New music ===
On 16 July 2020, Thompson collaborated with German DJ Zedd on the song "Funny".

== Discography ==
=== Studio albums ===
Title	Details	Peak chart positions	
Title	Details	UK	US Heat
Bundle of Tantrums	Released: 6 September 2013; Label: N/A (independent); Format: Digital download	160	8
Another Bundle of Tantrums	Released: 20 April 2014; Label: N/A (independent); Format: Digital download	126	9

=== Extended plays ===
Title	Details
Under the Willow Tree	Released: 20 October 2013; Label: N/A (independent); Format: Digital download
Take Cover	Released: 9 December 2014; Label: N/A (independent); Format: Digital download
Adore	Released: 18 September 2015; Label: Atlantic; Format: CD, digital download
Wonderland	Released: 19 May 2017; Label: Atlantic; Format: Digital download
Colour	Released: 29 March 2019; Label: Atlantic; Format: Digital download

=== Singles ===
==== As lead artist ====
Title	Year	Peak chart positions							Certification	Album
Title	Year	UK	FRA	GER	IRE	ITA	SCO	SWI	Certification	Album
"Ain't Nobody"	2013	32	—	—	76	—	32	—		Non-album single
"Adore"	2015	—	—	91	—	34	—	39	FIMI: Platinum; ZPAV: Gold	Adore
"Do It Now"	2016	—	—	—	—	—	—	—		Adore
"Mad World"	2017	—	14	—	—	—	—	—	FIMI: Gold	Non-album singles
"Where We Belong" (with Hugel)	2017	—	—	—	—	—	—	—		Non-album singles
"Rise Up" (with Thomas Jack)	2017	—	—	—	—	—	—	—		Non-album singles
"Wonderland"	2017	—	—	—	—	—	—	—		Wonderland
"Old Friends"	2017	—	—	—	—	—	—	—		Wonderland
"Lonely Together"	2018	—	—	—	—	—	—	—		Non-album single
"Loyal"	2019	—	—	—	—	—	—	—		Colour
"Take Care"	2019	—	—	—	—	—	—	—		Colour
"More"	2019	—	—	—	—	—	—	—		Colour
"This Year's Love"	2019	—	—	—	—	—	—	—		Non-album singles
"Love for the Lonely"	2020	—	—	—	—	—	—	—		Non-album singles
"Funny" (with Zedd)	2020	—	—	—	—	—	—	—	RIAA: Gold	Non-album singles
"Already There"	2021	—	—	—	—	—	—	—		Non-album singles
"Love Is Just a Word" (with Calum Scott)	2021	—	—	—	—	—	—	—		Non-album singles
"Without You" (with Felix Jaehn)	2024	—	—	—	—	—	—	—		Non-album singles
"I Follow You" (with M-22)	2024	—	—	—	—	—	—	—		Non-album singles
"IDK"	2024	—	—	—	—	—	—	—		Non-album singles
"If This Christmas Isn't White" (with Aaron Taylor)	2024	—	—	—	—	—	—	—		Non-album singles
"Invisible"	2025	—	—	—	—	—	—	—		Non-album singles
"Needed a Change"	2025	—	—	—	—	—	—	—		Non-album singles
"On The Run"	2025	—	—	—	—	—	—	—		Non-album singles
"Did I Miss It"	2025	—	—	—	—	—	—	—		Non-album singles
"No Poetry"	2025	—	—	—	—	—	—	—		Non-album singles
"You Are My Sunshine"	2025	—	—	—	—	—	—	—		Non-album singles
"Try To Wait"	2026	—	—	—	—	—	—	—		Non-album singles
"Celebrate"	2026	—	—	—	—	—	—	—		Non-album singles
"—" denotes a single that did not chart or was not released.

==== As featured artist ====
Title	Year	Peak chart positions										Certification	Album
Title	Year	UK	AUS	AUT	FRA	GER	IRE	ITA	NLD	SWE	SWI	Certification	Album
"Sun Goes Down" (Robin Schulz featuring Jasmine Thompson)	2014	94	7	3	15	2	11	62	—	57	3	BVMI: 3× Gold; FIMI: Gold; IFPI Swit: Platinum	Prayer
"Ain't Nobody (Loves Me Better)" (Felix Jaehn featuring Jasmine Thompson)	2015	2	6	1	2	1	5	22	1	7	5	BPI: Gold; ARIA: 3× Platinum; BEA: Platinum; IFPI DEN: 2× Platinum; SNEP: Gold; BVMI: 2× Platinum; FIMI: 3× Platinum; RMNZ: Platinum	Felix Jaehn and I
"Unfinished Sympathy" (The Six featuring Jasmine Thompson)	2015	—	—	—	—	—	—	—	—	—	—		Non-album singles
"Steady 1234" (DJ Vice featuring Jasmine Thompson and Skizzy Mars)	2016	—	—	22	—	9	—	—	—	58	—	BVMI: Gold	Non-album singles
"Outta My Head" (Cheat Codes and M-22 featuring Jasmine Thompson)	2025	—	—	—	—	—	—	—	—	—	—		Future Resiniance
"—" denotes a single that did not chart or was not released in that territory.

=== Songwriting credits ===
Year	Artist	Album	Song	Co-written with
2017	3lau	Non-album single	"Hot Water" (with Audien featuring Victoria Zaro)	Justin Blau, Nathaniel Rathbun, Emily Schwartz, Scott Friedman, Ido Zmishlany, Victoria Zaro
2018	Marshmello	Speak Your Mind	"Friends" (with Anne-Marie)	Christopher Comstock, Anne-Marie Nicholson, Natalie Dunn, Eden Anderson, Richard Boardman, Pablo Bowman, Sarah Blanchard
2018	Don Diablo	Future	"Higher" (featuring Betty Who)	Donald Schipper, Martijn van Sonderson, Lindy Robbins, Michael McGinnis, Nickolas Scapa
2020	Selena Gomez	Rare	"Kinda Crazy"	Selena Gomez, Justin Tranter, Rami Yacoub, Kristoffer Fodgelmark, Albin Nedler
