= Undressed (Kim Cesarion song) =

Single by Kim Cesarion

from the album Undressed
- Released: 22 March 2013
- Genre: R&B
- Length: 3:43
- Label: Aristotracks; RCA; Sony Music
- Songwriters: Arnthor Birgisson; Gary Clark; Kim Cesarion; Lukasz Duchnowski
- Producers: Arnthor Birgisson; Gary Clark

Kim Cesarion singles chronology
"Undressed" (2013)	"Brains Out" (2013)

Music video
- "Undressed" on YouTube

"Undressed" is the debut single by Swedish singer-songwriter Kim Cesarion from his debut album Undressed. It was released as the album's lead single in Sweden on 22 March 2013 through Aristotracks, RCA Records, and Sony Music. The song was written and produced by Arnthor Birgisson and Gary Clark, and it was co-written by Cesarion and Lukasz Duchnowski.

== Music video ==
A music video to accompany the release of "Undressed" was first released onto YouTube on 11 June 2013 at a total length of three minutes and fifty-four seconds.

== Track listing ==
Digital download
No.	Title	Length
1.	"Undressed"	3:43
2.	"Undressed" (live)	6:38

German CD single
No.	Title	Length
1.	"Undressed"
2.	"Undressed" (Sir Sampalot remix)

== Charts ==
=== Weekly charts ===
Weekly chart performance for "Undressed"
Chart (2013–2014)	Peak position
Australia (ARIA)	5
Denmark (Tracklisten)	6
Finland (Suomen virallinen lista)	11
Italy (FIMI)	106
Luxembourg (Billboard)	6
New Zealand (Recorded Music NZ)	32
Norway (VG-lista)	13
Poland Airplay (ZPAV)	3
Poland Dance (ZPAV)	50
Poland (Video Chart)	1
Romania (Airplay 100)	11
Sweden (Sverigetopplistan)	7
US Bubbling Under Hot 100 (Billboard)	13
US Pop Airplay (Billboard)	31

=== Year-end charts ===
Year-end chart performance for "Undressed"
Chart (2013)	Position
Denmark (Tracklisten)	19
Poland (ZPAV)	43
Sweden (Sverigetopplistan)	24
Chart (2014)	Position
Australia (ARIA)	52

== Certifications ==
Certifications for "Undressed"
Region	Certification	Certified units/sales
Australia (ARIA)	Platinum	70,000^{^}
Denmark (IFPI Danmark)	Gold	15,000^{^}
Norway (IFPI Norway)	Gold	5,000^{*}
Sweden (GLF)	3× Platinum	120,000^{‡}
^{*} Sales figures based on certification alone.^{^} Shipments figures based on certification alone.^{‡} Sales+streaming figures based on certification alone.

== Release history ==
Release history and formats for "Undressed"
Region	Date	Format	Label
Sweden	22 March 2013	Digital download	Aristotracks, Sony Music Entertainment
United States	22 July 2014	Mainstream airplay	Columbia
