= Adoration (disambiguation) =

Adoration is respect, reverence, strong admiration or devotion in a certain person, place, or thing.

Adoration may also refer to:

In arts and entertainment

- Adoration (1928 film), an American drama directed by Frank Lloyd
- Adoration (2008 film), a Canadian drama directed by Atom Egoyan
- Adoration (2013 film), or Two Mothers and Perfect Mothers, an Australian-French drama directed by Anne Fontaine
- Adoration (2019 film), a Belgian drama film directed by Fabrice Du Welz
- Adoration (TV series), an Italian television series
- Adoration (band), UK band formed in 2003
- Adoration: The Worship Album, by the Newsboys
- Adoration, an EP and single by Mortal Love
- "Adoration", song by Cranes

Other uses:

- Eucharistic adoration, a practice in the Roman Catholic, Anglo-Catholic and some Lutheran traditions
