= Ebba von Sydow =

Swedish journalist

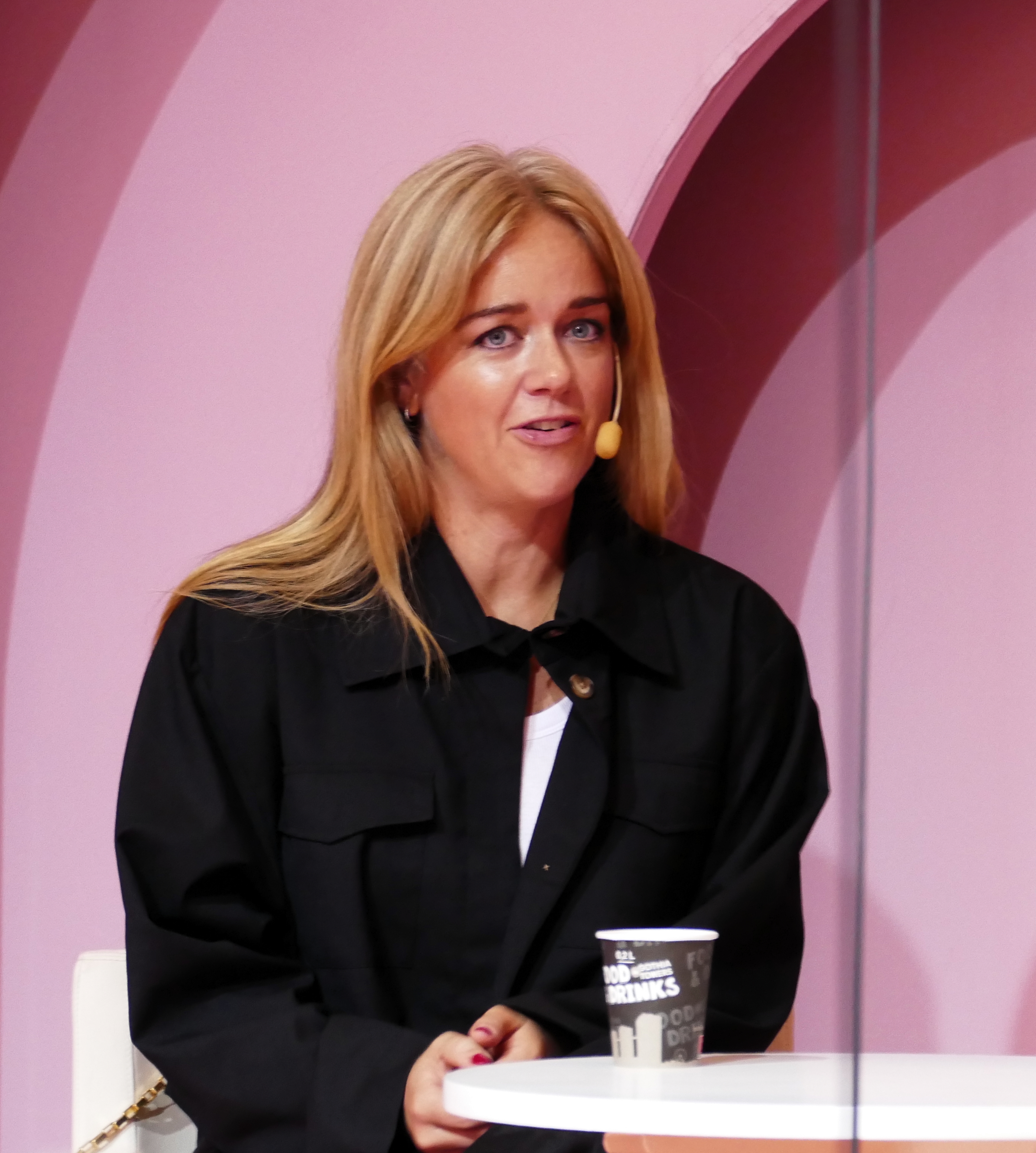
- von Sydow in 2023
- Born: Ebba Mary Matilda von Sydow; 18 February 1981 (age 45); Gothenburg, Sweden
- Education: University of Massachusetts
- Occupations: Journalist, TV personality, blogger, author
- Height: 178 cm (5 ft 10 in)
- Website: https://blogg.svt.se/ebba (archive)

Ebba Mary Matilda von Sydow (born 18 February 1981) is a Swedish journalist, author, columnist, and TV personality who also runs one of Sweden's most influential fashion and lifestyle blogs.

== Early life ==
Ebba von Sydow was born on 18 February 1981 in Gothenburg, Sweden.

Ebba is the great-granddaughter of the former Swedish Prime Minister, Oscar von Sydow. She is related to actor Max von Sydow and Social Democratic politician Björn von Sydow.

== Career ==
Ebba von Sydow studied journalism in Boston, Massachusetts where she hosted a weekly radio show. She then went to law school in Stockholm. In 2001, she started working as a fashion reporter and columnist for the evening paper Expressen. She went on to become editor-in-chief of Expressen Fredag.

In 2005, she became editor-in-chief of the long-running Swedish fashion and lifestyle magazine VeckoRevyn. Prior to that she also worked at the music magazine Groove. She has also worked for Swedish national radio, SR P3.

In the summer of 2010, she hosted the broadcasts Wedding of Victoria, Crown Princess of Sweden, and Daniel Westling, for national television in Sweden.

Ebba presented the early night show Gokväll on Saturdays on SVT, Sweden's biggest network. She left the show in May 2015. She then went on to present the morning show Nyhetsmorgon broadcast on TV4.

== Bibliography ==
- 2006 – Ebbas stil – Ebba Style – The Ultimate Guide to a Better Wardrobe
- 2011 – Kungligt snygg – Royal Style

== Personal life ==
Ebba von Sydow married Johan Kleberg in January 2011; the couple live in Stockholm.
