= Breathe (Jax Jones song) =

Single by Jax Jones featuring Ina Wroldsen

from the EP Snacks
- Released: 1 December 2017
- Recorded: 2017
- Genre: Deep house; bubblegum pop
- Length: 3:27
- Label: Polydor
- Songwriters: Timucin Aluo; Fred Gibson; Uzoechi Emenike; Ina Wroldsen; William Clarke
- Producers: Jax Jones; Mark Ralph (add.)

Jax Jones singles chronology
| "Instruction" (2017) | "Breathe" (2017) | "Ring Ring" (2018) |

Ina Wroldsen singles chronology
| "Strongest" (2017) | "Breathe" (2017) | "Sea" (2018) |

Music video
- "Breathe" on YouTube

"Breathe" is a song by English DJ and record producer Jax Jones featuring vocals by Norwegian singer Ina Wroldsen and co-written by Fred Gibson and Uzoechi Emenike. It was released on 1 December 2017 through Polydor Records. The song has peaked at number seven on the UK Singles Chart, number four in Ireland and number five in Scotland.

== Music video ==
The official music video was released on 23 January 2018, through Jax Jones's official YouTube account. It features dancers Shala Iwaskow and Shaadow Sefiroth filmed in several locations in London at night, most notably the Natural History Museum and the Millennium Bridge.

== Usage in media ==
In early summer 2018, the song was used in a TV commercial for El Corte Inglés, both in Spain and in Portugal. In 2021, it was sampled by American rapper Russ for his song "3:15 (Breathe)".

== Charts ==
=== Weekly charts ===
| Chart (2017–18) | Peak position |
|---|---|
| Austria (Ö3 Austria Top 40) | 14 |
| Belarus Airplay (Eurofest) | 2 |
| Belgium (Ultratop 50 Flanders) | 14 |
| Belgium Dance (Ultratop Flanders) | 3 |
| Belgium (Ultratop 50 Wallonia) | 6 |
| Bulgaria Airplay (PROPHON) | 2 |
| CIS Airplay (TopHit) | 1 |
| Colombia (National-Report) | 64 |
| Croatia (HRT) | 1 |
| Czech Republic Singles Digital (ČNS IFPI) | 85 |
| France (SNEP) | 95 |
| Germany (GfK) | 15 |
| Greece International Digital (IFPI Greece) | 14 |
| Hungary (Dance Top 40) | 8 |
| Hungary (Rádiós Top 40) | 1 |
| Hungary (Single Top 40) | 3 |
| Hungary (Stream Top 40) | 14 |
| Ireland (IRMA) | 4 |
| Mexico Airplay (Billboard) | 1 |
| Netherlands (Dutch Top 40) | 22 |
| Netherlands (Single Top 100) | 51 |
| Poland Airplay (ZPAV) | 1 |
| Portugal (AFP) | 63 |
| Romania (Airplay 100) | 5 |
| Russia Airplay (TopHit) | 1 |
| Scotland Singles (OCC) | 5 |
| Serbia (Radiomonitor) | 1 |
| Slovakia Airplay (ČNS IFPI) | 45 |
| Slovakia Singles Digital (ČNS IFPI) | 6 |
| Slovenia (SloTop50) | 13 |
| Spain (PROMUSICAE) | 53 |
| Sweden Heatseeker (Sverigetopplistan) | 2 |
| Switzerland (Schweizer Hitparade) | 13 |
| UK Singles (OCC) | 7 |
| UK Dance (OCC) | 1 |
| Ukraine Airplay (TopHit) | 8 |
| US Dance Club Songs (Billboard) | 39 |
| US Hot Dance/Electronic Songs (Billboard) | 12 |

=== Year-end charts ===
Year-end chart rankings for "Breathe"
| Chart (2018) | Position |
|---|---|
| Belgium (Ultratop Flanders) | 44 |
| Belgium (Ultratop Wallonia) | 34 |
| CIS (Tophit) | 1 |
| Germany (Official German Charts) | 45 |
| Hungary (Dance Top 40) | 21 |
| Hungary (Rádiós Top 40) | 4 |
| Hungary (Single Top 40) | 16 |
| Iceland (Plötutíóindi) | 41 |
| Ireland (IRMA) | 30 |
| Netherlands (Airplay Top 40) | 95 |
| Poland (ZPAV) | 8 |
| Romania (Airplay 100) | 37 |
| Russia Airplay (Tophit) | 1 |
| Slovenia (SloTop50) | 15 |
| Switzerland (Schweizer Hitparade) | 62 |
| Ukraine Airplay (Tophit) | 25 |
| UK Singles (Official Charts Company) | 39 |
| US Hot Dance/Electronic Songs (Billboard) | 50 |

| Chart (2019) | Position |
|---|---|
| Hungary (Dance Top 40) | 75 |
| Hungary (Rádiós Top 40) | 6 |

== Certifications ==
| Region | Certification | Certified units/sales |
|---|---|---|
| Australia (ARIA) | Platinum | 70,000^{‡} |
| Belgium (BRMA) | Gold | 10,000^{‡} |
| Canada (Music Canada) | Platinum | 80,000^{‡} |
| Denmark (IFPI Danmark) | Gold | 45,000^{‡} |
| Germany (BVMI) | Platinum | 400,000^{‡} |
| Italy (FIMI) | Gold | 25,000^{‡} |
| New Zealand (RMNZ) | Gold | 15,000^{‡} |
| Poland (ZPAV) | 2× Platinum | 100,000^{‡} |
| Spain (Promusicae) | Gold | 20,000^{‡} |
| United Kingdom (BPI) | Platinum | 600,000^{‡} |
Streaming
| Sweden (GLF) | Gold | 4,000,000^{†} |
^{‡} Sales+streaming figures based on certification alone.^{†} Streaming-only figures based on certification alone.
