= Breath (disambiguation) =

A breath is the act of inhaling and exhaling.

Breath may also refer to:

== Film ==
- Breath (2007 film), a South Korean film
- Breath (2009 film), a Turkish film
- Breath (2016 film), an Iranian film
- Breath (2017 film), an Australian film based on the Winton novel
- Shwaas or The Breath, a 2004 Indian film

== Literature ==
- Breath (novel), by Tim Winton, 2008
- Breath: The New Science of a Lost Art, a 2020 science book by James Nestor

== Music ==
- Breath (Rina Chinen album), 2001
- "Breath" (Breaking Benjamin song), 2007
- "Breath" (Pearl Jam song), 1992
- "Breath" (Swollen Members song), 2002
- "Breath", a 2020 song by Ili
- "Breath", a 2022 song by Ryokuoushoku Shakai
- SM the Ballad Vol. 2 – Breath a 2014 EP by SM the Ballad
- "Breath", from the music of Deltarune video game

== Other uses ==
- Breath (play), a 1969 short play by Samuel Beckett

== See also ==
- Breathe (disambiguation)
- Breathing
- Phonation, in phonetics
