= Arnthor Birgisson =

Icelandic-Swedish songwriter and producer

Arnþór Birgisson
- Born: 12 February 1976 (age 49); Reykjavík, Iceland
- Genres: Dance, electronic
- Occupation(s): Record producer, songwriter
- Years active: 1996–present

Arnthor Birgisson (Icelandic: Arnþór Birgisson; born 12 February 1976) is an Icelandic naturalized Swedish songwriter and producer. He moved to Sweden in 1978 (aged two) and has lived in Stockholm since.

== Information ==
As young Arnþór attended Adolf Fredrik's Music School in Stockholm, Sweden. He began his professional songwriting and production career in 1996 working at Cosmos Studios together with Kent (Gillström) Isaacs and Bloodshy. In 1997, the founders of Murlyn Music, Anders Bagge and Christian Wåhlberg, saw the potential in Arnþór and Bloodshy, and handpicked them for the newly formed production company. Arnþór's breakthrough came a year later with the song "Because of You" written for 98 Degrees. Arnþór specifically desired to collaborate with Janet Jackson, saying "let's just say we will definitely be prepared if and when that happens." During his tenure at Murlyn Music (until 2003) a series of hits were created for artists such as Janet Jackson, Jessica Simpson, Ronan Keating, Jennifer Lopez, Samantha Mumba and Celine Dion.

Between 2003 and 2008, Arnþór worked at Maratone (formerly Cosmos Studios. During the years at Maratone, Arnþór created songs for Enrique Iglesias, Shayne Ward and Westlife, among others.

In 2005, Arnþór was awarded Best Pop Song at the BMI London Awards for Janet Jackson's "All Nite (Don't Stop)."

In 2008, Arnþór's song "Say OK", performed by Vanessa Hudgens, was awarded the prize for "This Year's Biggest American Pop Hit" at the BMI London Awards.

Arnþór has also worked with Sony BMG Music Entertainment, Universal Music, EMI Group and Warner Music Group.

In 2008 Arnþór founded the Swedish-based record and production company, Aristotracks, together with businessman Linus Andreen and artist Emilia de Poret. Since then he has written and produced songs for artists such as Britney Spears, Leona Lewis and Shontelle.

On 7 September, Arnþór won Popjustice's 2011 Twenty Quid Music Prize for "Song of the Year" with "Higher" by The Saturdays.

Arnþór worked with Aristotracks artist Kim Cesarion on his debut album Undressed. In mid-2011, Arnþór founded a band with Ina Wroldsen called Ask Embla.

== Discography ==
Selected songs written / co-written and produced

- 1998 – 98 Degrees "Because of You" – producer/co-writer
- 2000 – Samantha Mumba "Gotta Tell You" – producer/co-writer
- 2000 – Jennifer Lopez "Play" – producer/co-writer
- 2001 – Jessica Simpson "Irresistible" – producer/co-writer
- 2002 – Carlos Santana "Let Me Love You Tonight" – producer/co-writer
- 2003 – Celine Dion "Sorry for Love" – co-writer
- 2004 – Janet Jackson "All Nite (Don't Stop)" – producer/co-writer
- 2004 – Janet Jackson "SloLove" – producer/co-writer
- 2006 – Danity Kane "Stay with Me" – producer/co-writer
- 2006 – Shane Filan / Westlife "Beautiful in White" – co-writer
- 2007 – Westlife "Us Against the World" – producer/co-writer
- 2007 – Westlife "Something Right" – producer/co-writer
- 2007 – Westlife "The Easy Way" – producer/co-writer
- 2007 – Westlife "Pictures in My Head" – producer/co-writer
- 2007 – Vanessa Hudgens "Say OK" – producer/co-writer
- 2007 – Enrique Iglesias "Wish I Was Your Lover" – producer/co-writer
- 2007 – Shayne Ward "No U Hang Up" – co-producer/co-writer
- 2008 – Emilia de Poret "Pick Me Up" – producer/co-writer
- 2008 – Lisa Miskovsky "Still Alive" – producer/co-writer
- 2009 – Natalie Bassingthwaighte "Alive" – producer/co-writer
- 2009 – Leona Lewis "My Hands" – producer/co-writer
- 2010 – Shontelle "Impossible" – producer/co-writer
- 2012 – James Arthur "Impossible" – co-writer
- 2013 – Kim Cesarion "Undressed" – co-producer/co-writer
- 2015 – Tove Styrke "Ego" – co-writer

== See also ==
- List of Icelandic writers
