= Face to Face Tour =

2006 concert tour by Westlife

- Tour by Westlife
- Promotional poster for tour
- Location: Asia; Ireland; UK
- Associated album: Face to Face
- Start date: 3 April 2006
- End date: 12 September 2006
- No. of shows: 60

Westlife concert chronology
- No. 1's Tour (2005); Face to Face Tour (2006); The Love Tour (2007)

The Face to Face Tour is the 6th world tour of the Irish pop band Westlife. This tour played in smaller venues and for smaller audiences. Their performance at Wembley Arena was recorded and released on DVD.

== Opening acts ==
- 4thBase
- Alsou
- Roxanne
- Nylon

== Setlist ==
1. "Flying Without Wings"
2. "Hit You with the Real Thing"
3. "When You're Looking Like That"
4. "Amazing"
5. "She's Back (contains elements of "Billie Jean")
6. "Uptown Girl
7. Medley:
  1. "Addicted To Love"
  2. "Wild Wild West" (contains elements of "I Wish")
  3. "Señorita"
  4. "Don't Cha"
8. "Colour My World"
9. "Hey Whatever"
10. "The Dance"
11. "Swear It Again"
12. "Seasons in the Sun"
13. "World of Our Own"
14. "Mandy"

Encore

15. "Queen of My Heart"
16. "What Makes a Man"
17. "You Raise Me Up"

Notes: In some cities, Westlife performed “When You Tell Me That You Love Me” and “Against All Odds.”

== Tour dates ==
Date	City	Country	Venue
Europe
3 April 2006	Belfast	Northern Ireland	Odyssey Arena
4 April 2006	Belfast	Northern Ireland	Odyssey Arena
5 April 2006	Belfast	Northern Ireland	Odyssey Arena
7 April 2006	Millstreet	Ireland	Green Glens Arena
8 April 2006	Millstreet	Ireland	Green Glens Arena
9 April 2006	Millstreet	Ireland	Green Glens Arena
11 April 2006	Dublin	Ireland	The Point Theatre
12 April 2006	Dublin	Ireland	The Point Theatre
15 April 2006	Dublin	Ireland	The Point Theatre
16 April 2006	Dublin	Ireland	The Point Theatre
18 April 2006	Dublin	Ireland	The Point Theatre
19 April 2006	Dublin	Ireland	The Point Theatre
21 April 2006	Manchester	England	Manchester Evening News Arena
22 April 2006	Manchester	England	Manchester Evening News Arena
24 April 2006	Nottingham	England	Nottingham Arena
25 April 2006	Nottingham	England	Nottingham Arena
27 April 2006	Sheffield	England	Hallam FM Arena
28 April 2006	Sheffield	England	Hallam FM Arena
29 April 2006	Birmingham	England	NEC Arena
30 April 2006	Birmingham	England	NEC Arena
2 May 2006	Newcastle	England	Metro Radio Arena
3 May 2006	Newcastle	England	Metro Radio Arena
5 May 2006	Glasgow	Scotland	Scottish Exhibition and Conference Centre
6 May 2006	Glasgow	Scotland	Scottish Exhibition and Conference Centre
7 May 2006	Glasgow	Scotland	Scottish Exhibition and Conference Centre
9 May 2006	Aberdeen	Scotland	Press and Journal Arena
10 May 2006	Aberdeen	Scotland	Press and Journal Arena
12 May 2006	Brighton	England	Brighton Centre
13 May 2006	Brighton	England	Brighton Centre
14 May 2006	Cardiff	Wales	Cardiff International Arena
15 May 2006	Cardiff	Wales	Cardiff International Arena
17 May 2006	Cardiff	Wales	Cardiff International Arena
18 May 2006	London	England	Wembley Arena
19 May 2006	London	England	Wembley Arena
20 May 2006^{[A]}	Lincoln	England	Sincil Bank Stadium
Asia
26 June 2006	Shanghai	China	Shanghai Grand Stage
Europe
30 June 2006^{[B]}	Woodstock	England	Blenheim Palace
1 July 2006^{[B]}	Harewood	England	Harewood House
8 July 2006^{[B]}	Maidstone	England	Leeds Castle
9 July 2006^{[B]}	Chatsworth	England	Chatsworth House
14 July 2006^{[B]}	Cardiff	Wales	Cardiff Coopers Field
15 July 2006^{[C]}	Blickling	England	Blickling Hall
16 July 2006^{[B]}	Bath	England	Recreation Ground
17 July 2006^{[D]}	Liverpool	England	Big Top Arena at Clarence Dock
21 July 2006^{[B]}	Edinburgh	Scotland	Edinburgh Castle Esplanade
22 July 2006^{[B]}	Kedleston	England	Kedleston Hall
23 July 2006^{[B]}	Northamptonshire	England	Althorp Estate
29 July 2006	East Cowes	England	Durbar Lawn at Osborne House
30 July 2006^{[E]}	Saffron Walden	England	Audley End House
18 August 2006^{[F]}	Newmarket	England	Newmarket Racecourse
19 August 2006^{[G]}	Chester	England	Chester Racecourse
25 August 2006^{[H]}	Bangor	Wales	Vaynol Estate
26 August 2006^{[E]}	London	England	Marble Hill Park
27 August 2006	Falmouth	England	Pendennis Castle
Asia
4 September 2006	Quezon City	Philippines	Araneta Coliseum
6 September 2006	Seoul	South Korea	Jamsil Arena
8 September 2006	Singapore		Singapore Indoor Stadium
9 September 2006	Hong Kong	China	AsiaWorld–Arena
10 September 2006	Taipei	Taiwan	TICC Plenary Hall
11 September 2006	Jakarta	Indonesia	Senayan Tennis Indoor Stadium

Festivals and other miscellaneous performances
^{A} This concert was a part of "Lincoln Live!"
^{B} These concerts were a part of the "Summer Nights Open Air Concert Series"
^{C} This concert was a part of the "National Trust Summer Concert Series"
^{D} This concert was a part of the "Liverpool Summer Pops"
^{E} This concert is a part of "Music on a Summer Evening"
^{F} This concert was a part of the "Newmarket Nights"
^{G} This concert was a part of "Chester Live"
^{H} This concert was a part of the "Faenol Festival"

== Credits ==
- Director: William Baker
- Musical Director/Arrangements: Steve Anderson
- Choreographer: Priscilla Samuels
- "Uptown Girl" Brass arranged by Steve Anderson and Richard Niles

== Live Concert Music DVD ==
=== Chart performance ===
Chart	Peak position
Ireland	1
Swedish Music Videos	7
UK Music Videos	1
UK DVD Videos (OCC)	23
UK Videos (OCC)	23

=== Certifications and sales ===
Region	Certification	Certified units/sales
United Kingdom (BPI)	2× Platinum	100,000^{*}
^{*} Sales figures based on certification alone.
