= Follow That Dream (band) =

Dutch pop band

- Origin: Netherlands
- Genre: Pop
- Years active: 2000–2001
- Label: Dino Music
- Members: Vanessa Eman; Rosa Vuik; Linda Burg Wrath; Peter van der Meer; Ben Saunders; Dean Saunders

Follow That Dream also known as F.T.D. or FTD was a Dutch pop band made up of Vanessa Eman, Rosa Vuik, Linda Burg Wrath, Peter van der Meer, Ben Saunders, Dean Saunders. Vanessa Eman was the lead singer of the band.

The band was formed in 2000 to take part in the Dutch singing competition Alles Voor De Band on RTL 4. The band had its debut hit single, the self-titled "Follow That Dream" taken from their album The Album. They followed it up with the single "One Night in Shanghai".

In May 2001 the group decided to split up, during the hype of the rival and much more popular Starmaker series.

== After the split ==
Some members of the band continued as solo artists:

- In 2002, immediately after the split-up if the band, lead singer Vanessa Eman took part in the 2002 season of the Dutch Idols. She sang Irene Cara's "Out Here on My Own", but was eliminated in week 2 of the competition.
- Band members and brothers in real life Dean Saunders and Ben Saunders formed the band "Brothers" singing "Stand As One" at the Nationaal Songfestival in 2003 in a failing bid to represent the Netherlands in the Eurovision Song Contest. They finished 7th out of 8 candidates.
- Ben Saunders won the first-ever title of The Voice of Holland on 21 January 2011
- His older brother Dean Saunders won the title of the third season of Popstars on 22 January 2011.

== Discography ==
=== Albums ===
- 2000: The Album on Dino Music

=== Singles ===
- 2000: "Follow That Dream" (reached #25 on Dutch Top 40)
- 2001: "One Night in Shanghai"
