= Ben Saunders (singer) =

Dutch singer (1983–2026)

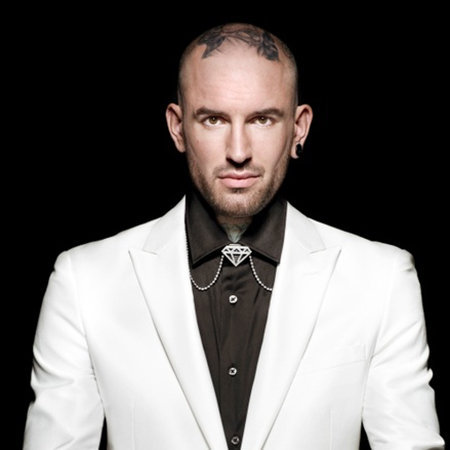

Background information
- Also known as: Tattoo Ben
- Born: 9 July 1983; London, England
- Died: 15 September 2026 (aged 43) Elst, Netherlands
- Occupations: Singer, tattoo artist
- Instrument: Vocals
- Years active: 1998–2026
- Label: 8ball Music

Ben Saunders (9 July 1983 – 15 September 2026) was an English-born Dutch singer who won the first-ever title of the Dutch singing competition series The Voice of Holland broadcast on RTL 4. The final of 2010–2011 season was held live on 21 January 2011. Saunders was also a tattoo artist. He was popularly known as "Tattoo Ben".

== Early life ==
Saunders was of English origin. He was the younger brother of Dean Saunders who on 22 January 2011, won the title of the third season (2010–2011) of the Dutch music competition Popstars, notably only a day after Ben's victory on The Voice.

Brothers Ben and Dean Saunders both started applying to talent competitions early like for the series Daddy's Wish. They also took part in 1998 in Life is like a box of chocolates program.

== Career ==
=== 1998–2003: Follow That Dream ===
In 2000, Dean and Ben Saunders both took part in RTL 4's Alles voor de band: Follow that dream. They were part of the band Follow That Dream (F.T.D.) (that included besides the two brothers Vanessa Eman, Rosa Vuik, Linda van Toornburg and Peter van der Meer. The band was signed to Dino Music record label.

Their debut single the self-titled "Follow That Dream" was released in November 2000 reaching No. 25 in the Dutch Top 40. 6 months later, the band split after the great popularity of the rival Starmaker show.

=== 2003: Eurovision Song Contest entry ===
On 15 February 2003 the Saunders brothers took part in the 2003 Dutch Nationaal Songfestival, a Dutch national music pre-selection contest for qualification to Eurovision Song Contest to be held in Riga, Latvia. They performed the song "Stand As One" in the third heat under the name "The Brothers" getting just 10 points and finishing with 3% of the popular vote as seventh out of 8 participants.

=== 2010–2026: The Voice of Holland ===
In 2010, Ben Saunders applied to The Voice of Holland singing competition proving to be very popular with both judges and the voting public, after singing in his audition "Use Somebody" from Kings of Leon. Ben was coached by Roel van Velzen. In the final, he sang his number one single, his cover version rendition of "If You Don't Know Me by Now" and duetted with Welsh singer Duffy on her song "Warwick Avenue" and won by 59% of the votes against runner-up Pearl Jozefzoon.

Saunders charted with four different songs in the top 15 of the Dutch charts, including attaining No. 1 position with his single "Kill For a Broken Heart".

== Personal life ==
Ben Saunders was born in England in 1983, but moved to the Netherlands in 1986, aged three. He resided in Hoorn, about 35 kilometres north of Amsterdam.

Before applying to the competition, Ben Saunders worked as a tattoo artist. He owned a tattoo parlour in Hoorn. He was popularly nicknamed "Tattoo Ben" because of his extensive tattoos.

In 2014 Saunders joined the notorious Satudarah motor club; club meetings had been occasionally hosted in his tattoo parlour since. In May 2015 Saunders was arrested for assaulting a traffic warden.

On 15 September 2026, his body was found in the Rijkerswoerdse Plassen in Arnhem. It is believed he drowned, aged 43.

== Discography ==
=== Albums ===
Year	Title	Chart positions	As
Year	Title	NL	As
2000	The Album	-	Band: Follow That Dream
2011	You Thought You Knew Me By Now	1	Solo: Ben Saunders
2012	Heart & Soul	7	Solo: Ben Saunders

=== Singles ===
Year	Title	Chart positions			As
Year	Title	NL 40	NL 100	TR 100	As
2000	Follow that dream	25	13	-	Band: Follow That Dream
2001	One night in Shanghai	-	-	-	Band: Follow That Dream
2003	Stand as one	-	-	-	Duo: The Brothers
2010	I'm in love with a girl	-	19	-	Solo: Ben Saunders
2010	If you don't know me by know	11	1	-	Solo: Ben Saunders
2010	Dancing in the street (ft. Alain Clark)	-	28	-	Solo: Ben Saunders
2010	When a man loves a woman	43	1	-	Solo: Ben Saunders
2011	I heard it through the grapevine	-	6	-	Solo: Ben Saunders
2011	Kill for a broken heart	4	1	-	Solo: Ben Saunders
2011	Dry your eyes	17	8	-	Solo: Ben Saunders
2011	All over	43	72	-	Solo: Ben Saunders
2011	Heart strings (this is love)	58	30	-	Solo: Ben Saunders
2012	Heart strings – International version	-	97	-	Solo: Ben Saunders
2012	No cure	33	9	-	Solo: Ben Saunders
2014	What you do (feat. Glowinthedark)	-	-	1	Solo: Ben Saunders

Awards and achievements
Preceded by N/A	The Voice of Holland; Winner; 2010–11	Succeeded by Iris Kroes
