= Geuteling =

Flemish food, similar to a pancake

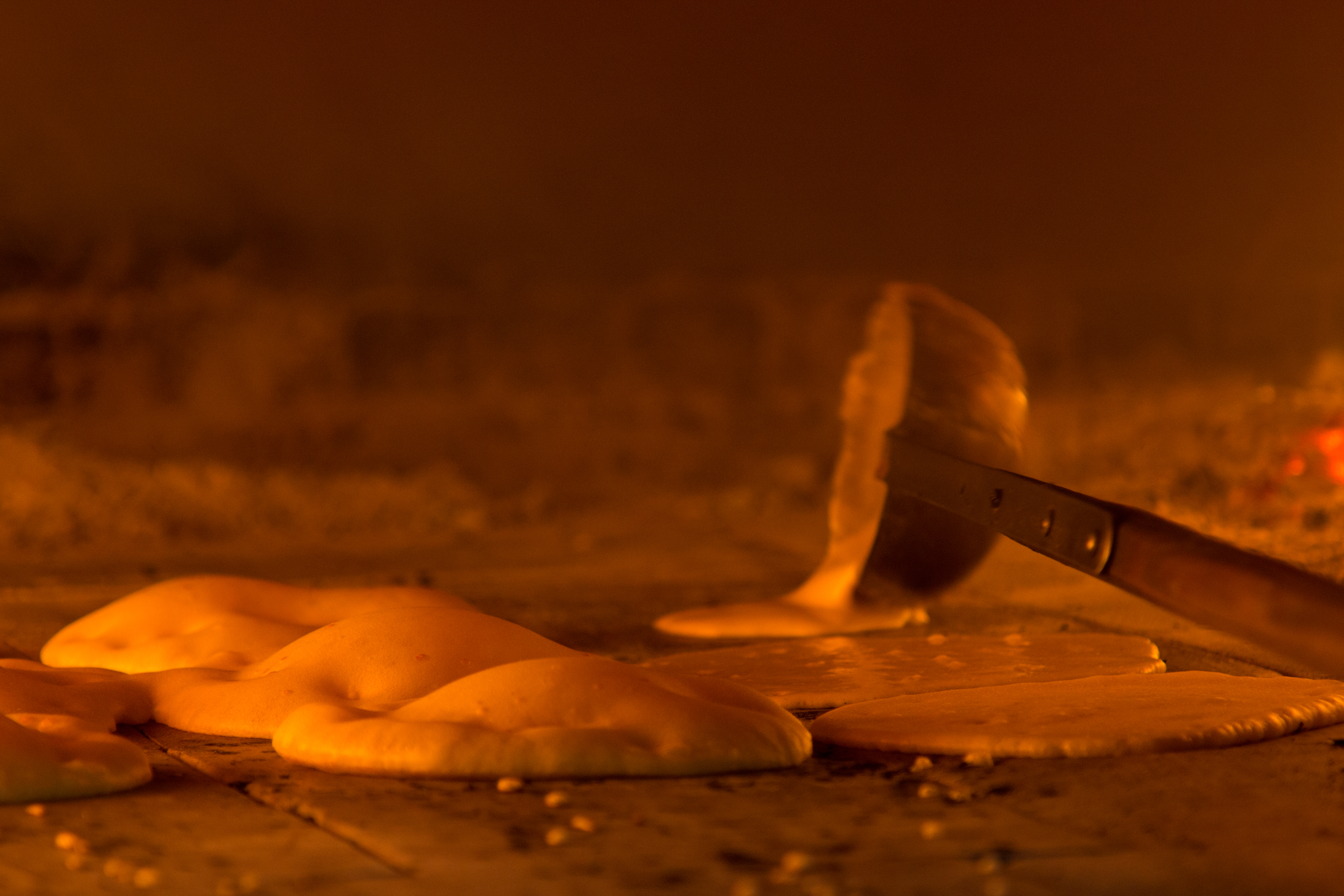
The dough is poured directly on the stone tile.

A geuteling (plural geutelingen) is a traditional food originated in Elst part of Brakel of the Flemish Ardennes region of Belgium, (not to be confused with the city Elst in the Netherlands) It bears some similarity to a pancake.

== Origin ==
Geutelingen began as a food to celebrate the Catholic feast of Saint Apollonia. According to legends Saint Apollonia was caught and tortured for her Christianity beliefs, during which her teeth were pulled and broken, events that started a pilgrimage from the late 1800, and till this very day there is a tradition to prepare geuteling every year for a period of four weeks in the midst of winter from the middle of January till the middle of February. Events that turned her patron and saint of dentists. The locals believe that preparing and eating geuteling during the festivities will grant them a year-long immunity to toothache.Families prepare their own dough, and they bring their dough to the local bakery to be baked. The next weekend the geutelingen are reheated in a casserole and shared with the whole family.

== The geuteling today ==
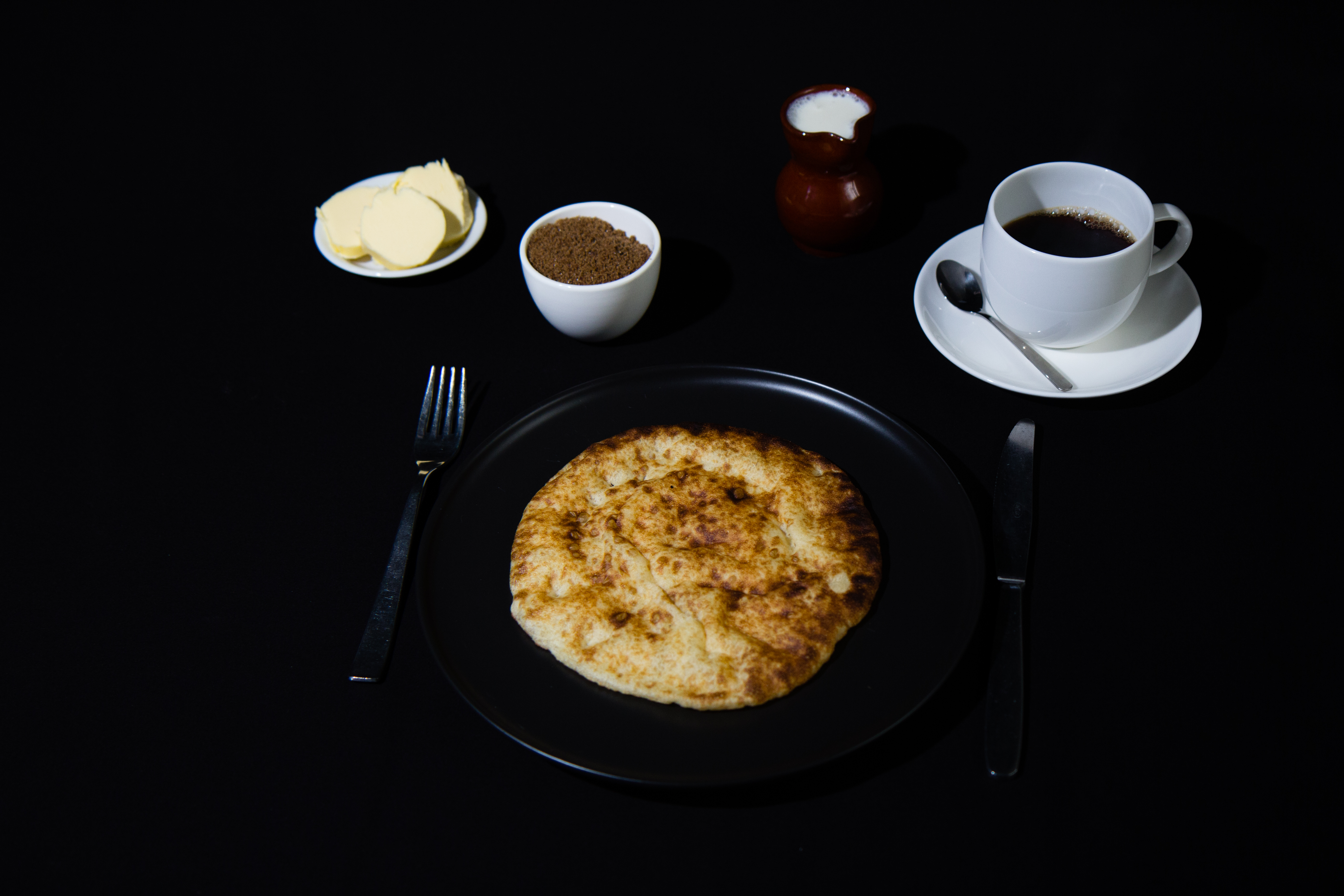
tasting geutelingen: with butter and brown sugar.

Today, the religious association has almost disappeared, but the feast of the geutelingen is still organised on the first weekend after the feast of Saint Apollonia: February 9. There is also a tradition of tossing the geuteling, as pancakes are tossed elsewhere.

Elst, part of the community of Brakel in East Flanders, promotes the geuteling in the Flemish Ardennes and elsewhere in the country. Elst is known as the village of the geutelingen.

== Preparation ==
Geutelingen are made from flour, milk, eggs, yeast, a little salt and a little cinnamon. The liquid dough is poured onto a clay tile in a very hot oven. The high temperature gives the geuteling its typical odour and flavour.
