= MEN2B =

MEN2B may refer to:

- MEN2B, a Dutch boy band that won the first season of the Dutch Popstars: The Rivals in 2004
- Multiple endocrine neoplasia type 2b
