= Face to Face (Westlife album) =

Studio album by Westlife
- Released: 31 October 2005
- Recorded: January – August 2005
- Studios: Rokstone Studios, (London), A Side Studios, Stockholm, Kingside Studio, Stockholm, Sanctuary Townhouse Studio, London, Larrabee North Studios, Los Angeles, The Location, Stockholm; Grouse Lodge Studios, Ireland
- Genre: Pop
- Length: 44:38
- Labels: S; RCA; Sony BMG
- Producers: Andreas "Quiz" Romdhane; Josef Larossi; David Kreuger; Per Magnusson; Carl Falk; Jake Schulze; Steve Mac

Westlife chronology
...Allow Us to Be Frank (2004)	Face to Face (2005)	The Love Album (2006)

Singles from Face to Face
- 1. "You Raise Me Up" Released: 24 October 2005; 2. "When You Tell Me That You Love Me" Released: 12 December 2005; 3. "Amazing" Released: 20 February 2006

Face to Face is the sixth studio album by Irish boy band Westlife. It was released by Sony BMG on 31 October 2005 in the United Kingdom. The group reteamed with Steve Mac for most of the album's production, alongside contributions from duo Quiz & Larossi, David Kreuger, Per Magnusson, and Carl Falk. The album features covers including "She's Back" by Human Nature, "Desperado" by the Eagles, Collin Raye's number one hit "In This Life", and a Nick Carter solo song, "Heart Without a Home".

The album received mixed reviews from critics, who praised its polished, familiar pop style and some of its stronger original songs, but noted its heavy reliance on cover material. Despite this, Face to Face was a commercial success. It became Westlife’s fifth non-consecutive number-one album in Ireland and their fourth in the United Kingdom, while also topping the charts in Australia and Scotland. The album achieved multi-platinum status in both Ireland and the UK and sold over one million copies across Europe.

Face to Face produced three singles, including "You Raise Me Up," a cover of the 2001 Secret Garden song, which became Westlife's 13th number-one single in the UK and remains one of their best-selling releases. It was followed by the top-five hits "When You Tell Me That You Love Me," a duet with original singer Diana Ross, and the original song "Amazing." The band further supported the album with the Face to Face Tour, which ran from 3 April 2006 to 12 September 2006 and included 60 dates.

== Promotion ==
=== Singles ===
"You Raise Me Up," a cover of the 2001 song by Irish-Norwegian duo Secret Garden, released as the lead single from Face to Face and became one of their most successful releases. It reached number one on the UK Singles Chart, marking the band's 13th UK number-one single, and also became a major international hit, achieving strong chart positions worldwide and eventually selling over 700,000 copies in the UK, alongside multi-platinum certifications. "When You Tell Me That You Love Me", was released as the album's second single, featuring guest vocals from the original artist Diana Ross. The single peaked at numbee two on the UK Singles Chart, missing the top spot by just 171 copies, and became the 39th best-selling single of 2005 in the UK. The release echoed the chart history of Ross's original version, which also peaked at number two in the UK, and similarly narrowly missed becoming the 2005 Christmas number one. Face to Face's third and final single, "Amazing", was released in February 2006. It debuted at number four, becoming the group 20th consecutive top 5 single in the UK.

=== Touring ===
From 3 April 2006 to 12 September 2006, Westlife embarked on the Face to Face Tour, their sixth concert tour, in support of the album. The tour marked a shift toward smaller venues and more intimate audiences compared to their earlier stadium shows, while still spanning Europe and Asia across 60 dates. Selected dates included opening acts such as 4thBase, Alsou, Roxanne, and Nylon.

== Critical reception ==
Professional ratings
Review scores
Source	Rating
AllMusic	3/5 stars
Entertainment.ie	1/5 stars
Manchester Evening News	4/5 stars
MTV Asia	7/10
Rovi	3/5 stars

Pamela Tan from MTV Asia praised Face to Face as a successful comeback album, saying Westlife "won’t disappoint you" and applauding the group for staying true to their "tried-and-tested formula" instead of changing their image or sound. She highlighted several tracks, arguing that although many songs were covers, the band still brought "their own brand of romance into the classics" and looked ready to "regain their former glory." Hot Press critic Colm O’Hare described the album as adhering to Westlife's "straightforward formula" of soaring ballads, mid-tempo pop songs, and carefully selected covers, resulting in a sound that is "at once familiar and forgettable," despite polished production and strong harmonies that ultimately "leave anyone with a half-decent record collection [...] left numb."

AllMusic editor Peter Fawthrop argued that Face to Face demonstrates Westlife's potential through stronger "original" songs like "Change Your Mind" and "Colour My World," while praising the Diana Ross duet as "a near perfect treat." However, he criticized the album's reliance on cover songs, claiming Westlife had become "a karaoke band" whose success was "being built on music that will not last," since many tracks failed to improve on the original versions. Entertainment.ie harshly criticized the album, describing it as "even drabber and more syrupy" than Westlife's earlier work. Blaming both songwriter Steve Mac and the band themselves, the website claimed Westlife always aimed for "the lowest common denominator" and called their music "a truly criminal record."

== Commercial performance ==
In Ireland, Face to Face became Westlife's fifth non-consecutive album to reach number one on the Irish Albums Chart. The album was a major commercial success in the country, later earning an 8× Platinum certification from the Irish Recorded Music Association (IRMA) for shipments of 120,000 copies, and finishing as the fourth best-selling album of 2005. In the United Kingdom, Face to Face became the group’s fourth non-consecutive album to reach number one on the UK Albums Chart. The album was later certified 4× Platinum by the British Phonographic Industry (BPI) for shipments exceeding 1.2 million copies, became the sixth best-selling album of 2005 in the United Kingdom, and later appeared at number 83 on the UK's decade-end albums chart for the 2000s. Elsewhere, Face to Face achieved strong international success, topping the charts in Australia and Scotland while reaching the top 10 in countries including Norway, Sweden, South Africa, Taiwan, and Argentina. The album also peaked at number five on the European Top 100 Albums and received a Platinum certification from the International Federation of the Phonographic Industry (IFPI) for selling over one million copies across Europe. In China, the album had more than 10,000 legal copies sold.

== Track listing ==
Face to Face track listing
No.	Title	Writer(s)	Producer(s)	Length
1.	"You Raise Me Up"	Brendan Graham; Rolf Løvland; Lo Ta-yu	Steve Mac	4:00
2.	"When You Tell Me That You Love Me" (with Diana Ross)	Albert Hammond; John Bettis	David Kreuger; Per Magnusson; Andreas Romdhane; Josef Larossi	3:56
3.	"Amazing"	Savan Kotecha; Kristian Lundin; Sebastian Thott; Didrik Thott; Carl Bjorsell; Jake Schulze	Carl Falk	2:49
4.	"That's Where You Find Love"	Mac; Wayne Hector; Chris Farren	Mac	3:44
5.	"She's Back"	Mac; Jörgen Elofsson	Mac	3:10
6.	"Desperado"	Don Henley; Glenn Frey	Mac	3:37
7.	"Colour My World"	Andreas Carlsson; Kotecha; Harry Sommerdahl	Falk; Schulze	3:55
8.	"In This Life"	Mike Reid; Allen Shamblin	Mac	4:08
9.	"Heart Without a Home"	Mac; Wayne Hector	Mac	4:47
10.	"Hit You with the Real Thing"	Björsell; Falk; Thott; Kotecha; Thott	Falk; Schulze	3:00
11.	"Change Your Mind"	Mac; Hector; Billy Joel	Mac	3:43

European bonus track
No.	Title	Writer(s)	Producer(s)	Length
12.	"Maybe Tomorrow"	Björsell; Thott; Kotecha; Thott	Falk	3:09

Japanese bonus tracks
No.	Title	Writer(s)	Producer(s)	Length
12.	"Maybe Tomorrow"	Björsell; Thott; Kotecha; Thott	Falk	3:09
13.	"World of Our Own" (acoustic version)	Mac; Hector; Dennis Morgan; Simon Climie		3:28
14.	"Flying Without Wings" (acoustic version)	Mac; Hector		3:35
15.	"My Love" (acoustic version)	Elofsson; Magnusson; Kreuger; Pelle Nylén		3:52

Notes

- Face to Face was also released on DualDisc in the UK, which included the videos of the making of "You Raise Me Up", the album photoshoot and exclusive interview footage.

== Credits ==
- Arranged By [Strings]:
  Dave Arch (tracks: 1, 4, 6, 8, 9, 11)
- Arranged By [Strings], Conductor [Strings]:
  Henrik Janson (tracks: 2, 3, 7)
  Ulf Janson (tracks: 2, 3, 7)
- Bass:
  Steve Pearce (tracks: 1, 4, 6, 8, 9, 11)
- Choir:
  The Tuff Session Singers (tracks: 1, 6, 8)
- Drums:
  Chris Laws (tracks: 1, 4, 5, 8, 11)
  Ian Thomas (tracks: 6, 9)
- Engineer:
  Chris Laws (tracks: 1, 4 to 6, 8, 9, 11)
  Dan Pursey (tracks: 1, 4, 5, 6, 8, 9, 11)
  Ren Swan (tracks: 1, 6, 8)
- Engineer [Mix]:
  Ren Swan (tracks: 1, 4, 5, 6, 8, 9, 11)

- Engineer [Strings]:
  Mike Ross-Trevor (tracks: 1, 6, 8, 9)
- Guitar:
  Fridrik Karlsson (tracks: 1, 5, 8)
  Paul Gendler (tracks: 4, 6, 9, 11)
- Keyboards:
  Steve Mac (tracks: 1, 4, 5, 6, 8, 9, 11)
- Mastered By:
  Dick Beetham (tracks: 2 to 11)
  Vlado Meller (tracks: 1)
- Photography:
  Neil Kirk
- Piano:
  Dave Arch (tracks: 1, 6, 8, 9)
  Steve Mac (tracks: 4, 11)
- Strings:
  Stockholm Session Strings (tracks: 2, 3, 7)

== Charts ==
=== Weekly charts ===
Weekly chart performance for Face to Face
Chart (2005–06)	Peak position
Argentine Albums (CAPIF)	9
Australian Albums (ARIA)	1
Belgian Albums (Ultratop Flanders)	71
Danish Albums (Hitlisten)	19
Dutch Albums (Album Top 100)	30
European Top 100 Albums (Billboard)	5
German Albums (Offizielle Top 100)	18
Greek Albums (IFPI)	38
Irish Albums (IRMA)	1
Japanese Albums (Oricon)	35
Norwegian Albums (VG-lista)	7
Scottish Albums (OCC)	1
South African Albums (RISA)	2
Swedish Albums (Sverigetopplistan)	9
Swiss Albums (Schweizer Hitparade)	14
Taiwanese Albums (G-Music)	2
UK Albums (Official Charts)	1

=== Year-end charts ===
2005 year-end chart performance for Face to Face
Chart (2005)	Position
Irish Albums (IRMA)	4
Swedish Albums (Sverigetopplistan)	93
UK Albums (OCC)	6

2006 year-end chart performance for Face to Face
Chart (2006)	Position
Australian Albums (ARIA)	25
UK Albums (OCC)	129

=== Decade-end charts ===
Decade-end chart performance for Face to Face
Chart (2000–2009)	Position
UK Albums (OCC)	83

== Certifications and sales ==
Certifications and sales for Face to Face
Region	Certification	Certified units/sales
Australia (ARIA)	Platinum	70,000^{^}
China	—	10,000
Ireland (IRMA)	8× Platinum	120,000^{^}
Sweden (GLF)	Gold	30,000^{^}
Taiwan	—	20,000
United Kingdom (BPI)	4× Platinum	1,200,000^{^}
Summaries
Europe (IFPI)	Platinum	1,000,000^{*}
^{*} Sales figures based on certification alone.^{^} Shipments figures based on certification alone.

== Release history ==
Face to Face release history
Country	Release date
Ireland	31 October 2005
Philippines	31 October 2005
United Kingdom	31 October 2005
South Korea	1 November 2005
Brazil	December 2005
Australia	12 December 2005
Taiwan	12 December 2005
Poland	13 February 2006
