= Red (Dutch band) =

Dutch pop group

RED!
- Origin: Netherlands
- Years active: 2008–2010
- Labels: Warner Music
- Members: Brandi Russell; Steffie Zoontjes; Deon Leon

RED! was a Dutch pop group formed in the television program Popstars in its debut 2008 edition. The members were the three winning finalists of the program, namely Brandi Russell, Steffie Zoontjes and Deon Leon. They had come first, second and third respectively and were all declared winners.

Brandi Russel was born in Kentucky on 31 May 1982 but lived in Florida. She was a singer, actress and dancer and very active in musical theater. For several years, Russell lived in the Netherlands, where she worked as a teacher in singing, drama, music and tap dancing. Zoontjes and Leon were, on the other hand, Dutch nationals and both born in 1990.

The debut single of RED! called "Step Into The Light". It was recorded at Abbey Road Studios in London and the group was signed to Warner Music. SBS6, the Dutch television channel which aired Popstars had an agreement with Warner for promotional support of the group, including commercials for the debut broadcast. On the basis of downloads directly after the final broadcast of Popstars, the song hit straight to the top of the Single Top 100 on 27 December 2008 on its first week of release. It stayed for a total of ten weeks on the chart.

There were follow-up singles "Guilty" and "Conga", the latter a cover of Miami Sound Machine. RED! officially disbanded in January 2010, reportedly for lack of further success.

== After split ==
After the split, Brandi Russel went on to have a solo single with "Broken Doll" which was a minor hit for her that reached #42 in the Single Top 100.

=== Singles ===
Single title	Release date	Charting in the Dutch Top 40			Comments
Single title	Release date	Date of entry	Highest	Weeks	Comments
Step Into The Light	19-12-2008	27-12-2008	tip2	-	#1 in de Single Top 100
Guilty	01-05-2009	-			
Conga	11-07-2009	-			#42 in de Single Top 100

== See also ==
- Popstars (Netherlands)
