= Wesley Klein =

Dutch singer (born 1988)

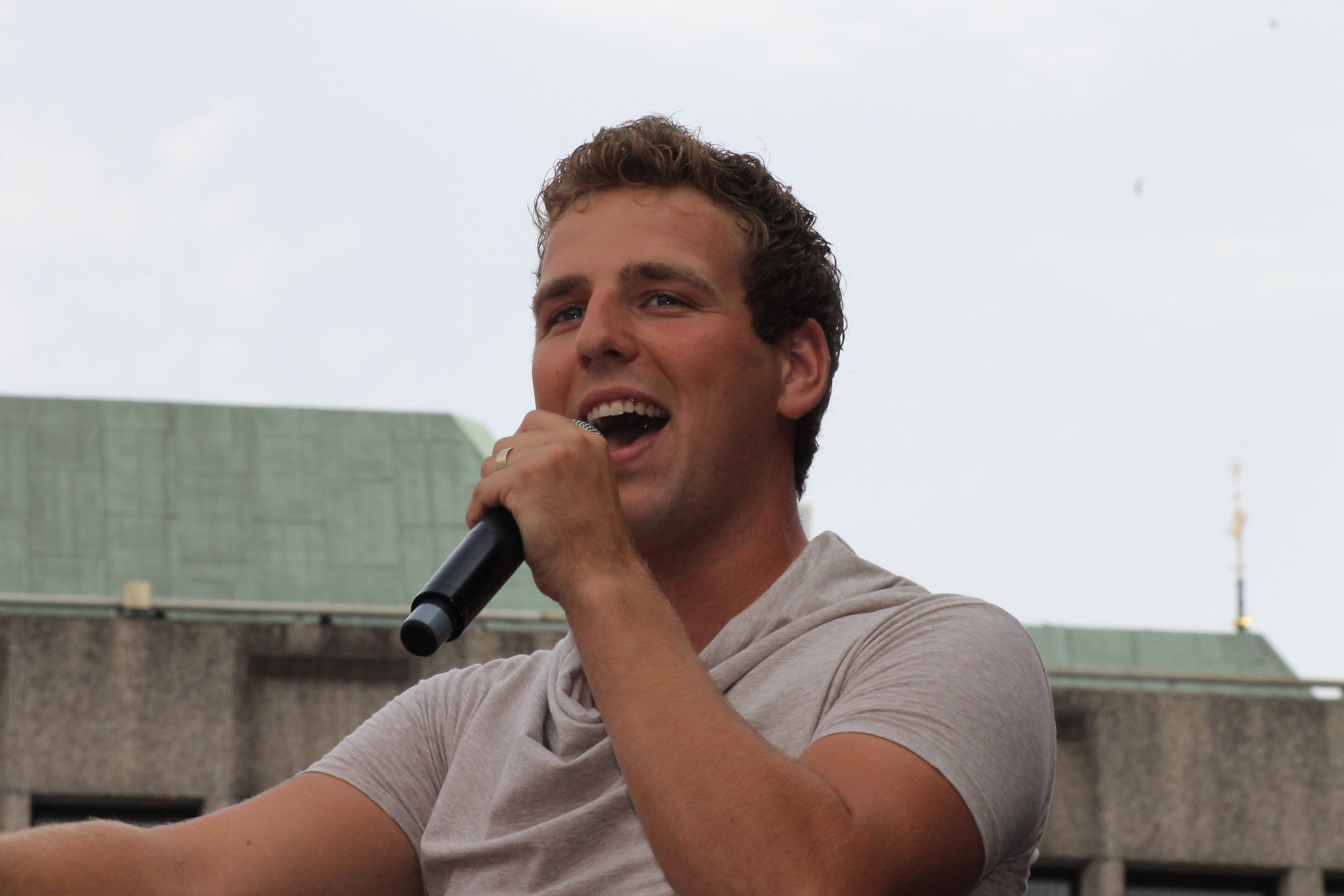
- Wesley Klein during his performance at Hart voor Muziek in Eindhoven, the Netherlands.

Background information
- Born: Wesley Klein; March 25, 1988 (age 38)
- Origin: Leiderdorp, Netherlands
- Occupation: Singer
- Instruments: Vocals, piano
- Years active: 2005–present
- Label: Berk Music
- Website: wesleyklein.nl

Wesley Klein (born 25 March 1988 in Leiderdorp, Netherlands) is a Dutch singer. He was mainly known for his participation in the Dutch version of the talent show Popstars on SBS6 in its second series (2009–2010) in June 2009 in which he won on 29 January 2010.

Klein worked in construction until his talent was discovered by accident during a gig in a pub in 2005. He started playing gigs and taking part in local music festivals. After successfully auditioning for the Dutch Popstars in 2009, he went on to win the title, receiving a trophy and a record deal to release his debut single "You Raise Me Up", the winner's song sung by all four finalists. His version was released immediately after the finals and shot to No. 1 on the Dutch Single Top 100 chart dated 6 February 2010, staying at the top for two weeks. In May 2010, Klein performed at three sold out concerts at the Amsterdam ArenA with De Toppers. His debut album Vandaag en morgen (meaning "Today and Tomorrow" in Dutch) was released on 9 July 2010.

Klein started a relationship with Nellie and they have a daughter and a son together. He proposed to her in 2015 and they got married on 7 July, 2017 in Leiden.

On 15 March 2012, Klein signed a contract with the record label Berk Music.

== Discography ==
=== Albums ===
Album title	Release date	Charting in the Dutch Album Top 100			Comments
Album title	Release date	Date of entry	Highest	Weeks	Comments
Vandaag en morgen	9 July 2010	17 July 2010	5	8	
Onderweg	23 January 2016	30 January 2016	26		

=== Singles ===
Single title	Release date	Charting in the Dutch Top 40			Comments
Single title	Release date	Date of entry	Highest	Weeks	Comments
"You Raise Me Up"	4 February 2010	13 February 2010	4	11	No. 1 Single Top 100
"Een ongelofelijke droom"	19 March 2010	3 April 2010	tip2	-	No. 2 Single Top 100
"Levenslang"	10 June 2010	-			No. 16 Single Top 100
"Een mooie dag"	2 September 2010	-			No. 13 Single Top 100
"Een vrolijk kerstfeest"	2 December 2010	-			No. 36 Single Top 100
