= Saint Apollonia (Zurbarán) =

1636 painting by Francisco de Zurbarán

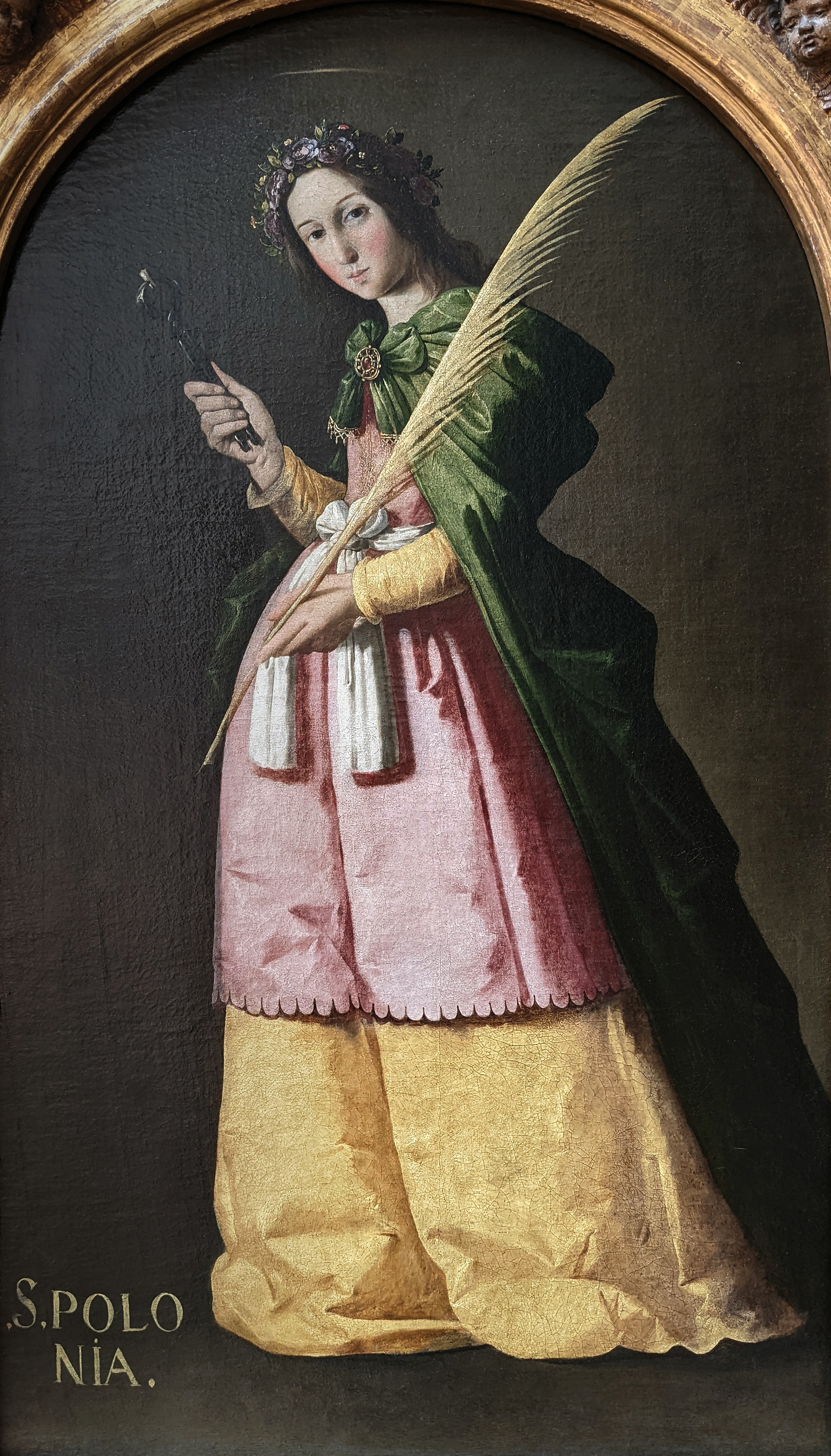
- Artist: Francisco de Zurbarán
- Year: 1636
- Medium: Oil on canvas
- Dimensions: 113 cm × 66 cm (44 in × 26 in)
- Location: Louvre, Paris

Saint Apollonia is a 1636 oil-on-canvas painted by the Spanish artist Francisco de Zurbarán. It is currently held and exhibited at the Louvre in Paris.

== History ==
Bought by the Louvre in 1867 from the collection of Marshal Soult, Duke of Dalmatia, this painting was perhaps part of the high altar of San José in the church of the Discalced Fathers of Mercy in Seville, together with a Saint Joseph Crowned by Christ and a God the Father now in the Museum of Fine Arts of Seville, and possibly a Saint Lucy in the Museum of Chartres, believed to be a companion piece to the Louvre painting - this last must be a studio work, however.

The painting can be grouped with the pictures for the altar in the transept of the church of San José in Seville, dated 1636. It belongs to Zurbarán's most balanced period, when he produced his greatest masterpieces.

Renaissance artists had clothed their saints in classical draperies. Adopting to a certain extent the attitude of the Middle Ages, certain 17th century painters, such as Georges de La Tour, Zurbarán, and Caravaggio dressed them in the contemporary fashion. The natural mediators between God and the faithful are thus seen in a kind of mystical familiarity.

Saint Apollonia was the patroness of dentists, hence the attribute she carries. Her martyrdom is said to have included the extraction of all her teeth.

== See also ==
- Caravaggisti
- Francisco de Zurbarán
- Saint Apollonia
