= Crazy (Julio Iglesias album) =

Studio album by Julio Iglesias
- Released: 17 May 1994
- Genre: Latin pop
- Label: Columbia Records

Julio Iglesias chronology
Calor (1992)	Crazy (1994)	La Carretera (1995)

Professional ratings
Review scores
Source	Rating
AllMusic	4.5/5 stars
Music Week	4/5 stars

Crazy is a 1994 album by Julio Iglesias.

== Track listing ==
No.	Title	Writer(s)	Length
1.	"Crazy" (feat. Dave Koz)	Willie Nelson	3:16
2.	"Let It Be Me" (feat. Art Garfunkel)	Gilbert Bécaud, Pierre Delanoë, Manny Curtis	3:05
3.	"Mammy Blue"	Hubert Giraud, Phil Trim	4:15
4.	"Fragile" (feat. Sting)	Sting	4:23
5.	"Guajira / Oye Como Va"	José Chepitó Areas, David Brown, Nicolás Reyes, Tito Puente	3:54
6.	"When You Tell Me That You Love Me" (feat. Dolly Parton)	Albert Hammond, John Bettis	3:59
7.	"I Keep Telling Myself"	Albert Hammond, Mark E. Nevin	4:17
8.	"Pelo Amor de Uma Mulher (Por el Amor de una Mujer)"	Danny Daniel, Sonny Marti	3:52
9.	"Caruso"	Lucio Dalla	5:48
10.	"Song of Joy"	Ludwig van Beethoven	4:38
Total length:			40:27

== Charts ==
=== Weekly charts ===
Weekly chart performance for Crazy
Chart (1994)	Peak
Australian Albums (ARIA)	7
Dutch Albums (Album Top 100)	7
European Albums (European Top 100 Albums)	11
German Albums (Offizielle Top 100)	73
Hungarian Albums (MAHASZ)	16
New Zealand Albums (RMNZ)	6
Norwegian Albums (VG-lista)	7
Portuguese Albums (AFP)	4
Scottish Albums (OCC)	4
Spanish Albums (AFYVE)	1
Swedish Albums (Sverigetopplistan)	44
UK Albums (OCC)	6
US Billboard 200	30

=== Year-end charts ===
1994 year-end chart performance for Crazy
Chart (1994)	Rank
Australian Albums (ARIA)	65
Dutch Albums (Album Top 100)	20
European Albums (European Top 100 Albums)	41
Spanish Albums (AFYVE)	11
UK Albums (OCC)	26

== Certifications ==
Certifications and sales for Crazy
Region	Certification	Certified units/sales
Argentina (CAPIF)	Gold	30,000^{^}
Australia (ARIA)	Gold	35,000^{^}
Brazil (Pro-Música Brasil)	Platinum	250,000^{*}
Canada (Music Canada)	Gold	50,000^{^}
Denmark (IFPI Danmark)	Gold	25,000^{^}
Hong Kong (IFPI Hong Kong)	Gold	10,000^{*}
Indonesia	3× Platinum	
Italy (FIMI)	Gold	50,000^{*}
Malaysia	Platinum	
Netherlands (NVPI)	Platinum	100,000^{^}
New Zealand (RMNZ)	Gold	7,500^{^}
Norway (IFPI Norway)	Gold	25,000^{*}
Portugal (AFP)	Gold	20,000^{^}
Singapore (RIAS)	Gold	
Spain (Promusicae)	2× Platinum	200,000^{^}
South Korea (KMCA)	Platinum	
Taiwan (RIT)	Platinum	
United Kingdom (BPI)	Platinum	300,000^{^}
United States (RIAA)	Gold	700,000
Summaries
Europe (IFPI)	Platinum	1,000,000^{*}
Worldwide	—	3,000,000
^{*} Sales figures based on certification alone.^{^} Shipments figures based on certification alone.
