= Elst =

Elst may refer to:

- Elst, Belgium, a village in the province of East Flanders, Belgium
- Elst, Gelderland, a town in the municipality of Overbetuwe, Netherlands
- Elst, Utrecht, a town in the municipality of Rhenen, Netherlands
- Elista, capital city of the Republic of Kalmykia, Russia (Kalmyk: Элст, Elst)
- MV Elst, a Dutch coastal tanker
- Eric Walter Elst (1936–2022), Belgian astronomer
- Koenraad Elst (born 1959), Belgian writer and orientalist
- Endolymphatic sac tumor, a benign neoplasm arising from the endolymphatic sac
