= You Raise Me Up =

2001 song by Secret Garden

Song by Secret Garden

from the album Once in a Red Moon
- Released: 27 December 2001
- Genre: Classical crossover, Celtic New Age
- Length: 5:04
- Label: Decca
- Composer: Rolf Løvland
- Lyricist: Brendan Graham
- Producers: Fionnuala Sherry; Rolf Løvland

"You Raise Me Up" is a song composed by Rolf Løvland with lyrics by Brendan Graham. It was first recorded by Norwegian-Irish band Secret Garden, in collaboration with Irish singer Brian Kennedy. Although the original version was not a major hit, the song has since been recorded by more than a hundred other artists, most notably American singer Josh Groban in 2003 and Irish group Westlife in 2005.

== Background ==
Rolf Løvland composed an instrumental piece in 2001 and titled it "Silent Story". He later approached Irish novelist and songwriter Brendan Graham to write the lyrics to his melody, after reading Graham's novels. The song was performed for the very first time at the funeral of Løvland's mother. The original designated vocalist was Johnny Logan, who recorded a demo with an orchestra. However, the vocalist was changed due to a desire to distance the album from the Eurovision Song Contest, in which all three men were known for their success: Logan had won twice as a performer and twice as a composer, Løvland had won once as a performer and twice as a composer, and Graham had won twice as a composer.

In 2002, it was released on the Secret Garden album Once in a Red Moon, with the lead vocals recorded by Irish singer Brian Kennedy. The bridge is performed by Tracey Campbell-Nation, and backing vocals are by London Community Gospel Choir and Anúna. The album sold well in both Ireland and Norway. Originally, Brian Kennedy was supposed to follow Secret Garden on their Asian tour in 2002, but Curb Records couldn't come to an agreement with Universal to release Brian, and he reluctantly could not attend the tour. He was replaced by Norwegian singer Jan Werner Danielsen, who also later recorded the song together with Secret Garden. A demo version of this recording was released in 2010, on Danielsen's posthumous compilation album One More Time - The Very Best Of, which included several previously unpublished recordings.

== "Söknuður" dispute ==
In April 2018 Icelandic composer Jóhann Helgason claimed the song infringed the copyright of his 1977 work "Söknuður," meaning "Into the light" sung by Vilhjálmur Vilhjálmsson, stating that Løvland would have heard the song while living in Iceland. The Performing Rights Society of Iceland analyzed both songs and found a 97% similarity between them, stating that the songs are "musically identical" except for just two notes. It was disclosed at a press conference that Groban had "Söknuður" played for him in 2007, who reacted in an 'alarmed' fashion. He then admitted that the two songs were similar and he didn't know where the inspiration had come from. Later, singer Edgar Smári performed "Söknuður" in English to outline the similarities.

In April 2020 the United States District Court of the Central District of California granted summary judgment in favor of Løvland and Graham, "finding that it is not substantially similar to Icelandic song Soknudur as a matter of law, and excluding plaintiff's expert musicologist's reports as unreliable, unhelpful, and inadmissible." The court acknowledged that the songs have similarities, but accepted the argument that those similar parts were not necessarily Helgason's own work in the first place; substantially the same material is in "Londonderry Air" (the melody of "Danny Boy") and other old public-domain songs (it also list a Johnny Mathis song "When a Child Is Born" which, ironically, was made before "Söknuður", and which also used similar melodies and pitches).

== Popularity ==
When issued as a CD single, the Secret Garden version of "You Raise Me Up" charted at number 103 on the UK Singles Chart in May 2002. Despite this modest initial success, the song has since become a major hit around the world, having been covered more than 125 times. Irish singer Daniel O'Donnell's version reached number 22 in the UK in December 2003. Brian Kennedy released his own solo recording of the song in the same month, reaching number 91. Another solo version of the song by Brian Kennedy also found success as part of a three-song EP entitled "George Best – A Tribute". Credited to Brian Kennedy and Peter Corry, the song was backed with a version of "The Long and Winding Road" by Peter Corry and a medley performed by both Kennedy and Corry, with the EP reaching number four in the UK in January 2006.

Christian group Selah's version, included in their 2004 album Hiding Place, peaked at number two on Billboard's Hot Christian Songs and Christian Airplay in June 2004. This recording was nominated for Song of the Year at the 2005 Dove Awards.

Josh Groban took his version to number 73 on the Billboard Hot 100 and number one on the US Adult Contemporary chart, Westlife reached number one on the UK Singles Chart with theirs, and Dutch Popstars winner Wesley Klein reached number four in the Netherlands with his recording.

In 2004, the song was played more than 500,000 times on American radio. In late 2005, there were over 80 versions available in the US alone. It has been nominated for the Gospel Music Awards four times, including "Song of the Year."

On 21 September 2006, "You Raise Me Up" became the first song to have sold over 76,000 copies of the score on the popular sheet music website musicnotes.com.

== Josh Groban version ==
"You Raise Me Up"

Single by Josh Groban

from the album Closer
- Released: 10 September 2004
- Length: 4:52
- Label: Reprise; Warner Bros.; 143
- Composer: Rolf Løvland
- Lyricist: Brendan Graham
- Producer: David Foster

Josh Groban singles chronology
"O Holy Night" (2002)	"You Raise Me Up" (2004)	"Remember When It Rained" (2004)

Music video
- "You Raise Me Up" on YouTube

In 2003, David Foster decided to produce the song after being introduced to it by Frank Petrone of Peermusic, the song's publisher. He chose the up-and-coming Josh Groban to record the song, which was accompanied by the tenor Craig Von Vennik of the Establishment. Groban's version made it to No. 1 on the Billboard adult contemporary chart in early 2004 and remained there for six weeks. This version also peaked at No. 73 on the Billboard Hot 100, his first single to do so, and was nominated for a 2005 Grammy Award for Best Male Pop Vocal Performance.

=== Performances ===
Groban performed the song at Super Bowl XXXVIII, in a special NASA commemoration for the crew of the Space Shuttle Columbia disaster. A special surprise performance by Groban, for Oprah Winfrey's 50th birthday, also gave "You Raise Me Up" international prominence. On 25 April 2007, Groban performed it at the first Idol Gives Back Concert, along with the African Children's Choir. This version was released as a single and peaked at No. 76 on the Billboard Hot 100. He performed this version with the African Children's Choir again on The Ellen DeGeneres Show on 10 August 2007.

On 26 May 2007, Groban appeared on the BBC's talent show Any Dream Will Do to select one of the remaining contestants (or "Josephs") to perform the song with him. He chose show favourite and eventual winner Lee Mead, whilst the other four contestants (Lewis Bradley, Craig Chalmers, Ben Ellis, and Keith Jack) performed as backing singers. Following this, the solo version of "You Raise Me Up" charted in the UK at No. 74, making it his first chart entry there.

=== Charts ===
==== Weekly charts ====
Solo version
Chart (2004–2012)	Peak position
Austria (Ö3 Austria Top 40)	54
Denmark (Tracklisten)	26
France (SNEP)	16
Switzerland (Schweizer Hitparade)	54
UK Singles (Official Charts)	74
US Billboard Hot 100	73
US Adult Contemporary (Billboard)	1

With The African Children's Choir version
Chart (2007)	Peak position
US Billboard Hot 100	76

==== Year-end charts ====
Chart (2004)	Position
US Adult Contemporary (Billboard)	10

=== Certifications ===
Region	Certification	Certified units/sales
Canada (Music Canada)	2× Platinum	160,000^{‡}
New Zealand (RMNZ)	Gold	7,500^{*}
United Kingdom (BPI)	Silver	200,000^{‡}
United States (RIAA)	3× Platinum	3,000,000^{‡}
^{*} Sales figures based on certification alone.^{‡} Sales+streaming figures based on certification alone.

== Westlife version ==
"You Raise Me Up"

Single by Westlife

from the album Face to Face
- Released: 24 October 2005
- Studio: Rokstone, London
- Length: 4:01
- Label: RCA; Sony BMG; S
- Composer: Rolf Løvland
- Lyricist: Brendan Graham
- Producer: Steve Mac

Westlife singles chronology
"Smile" (2004)	"You Raise Me Up" (2005)	"When You Tell Me That You Love Me" (2005)

Music video
- "You Raise Me Up" on YouTube

You Raise Me Up CD2

"You Raise Me Up" was released as the lead single from Westlife's sixth studio album Face to Face. This version is one of the most successful covers of the song, peaking at No. 1 on the UK Singles Chart, the only version to do so. This was the band's 13th number-one single as well as the first single to be released following Brian McFadden's departure from the group. It debuted with 97,288 combined physical and download sales in the UK alone. The single has sold 786,494 copies in the UK so far. In South Korea, it entered the Official South Korean Year-end Downloads Singles Chart in 2010 with 130,759 sales. Later, it stayed in the top 75 of the Official International Karaoke Charts since the inception of the charts in December 2010 up to its recent chart released. The backing track is re-used in the Spanish version of this song, "Por Ti Sere", performed by Il Divo on their Siempre album.

Westlife performed this song with Secret Garden at the 2005 Nobel Peace Prize concert. On 11 December 2009, they performed it again at the 2009 Nobel Peace Prize concert celebrating US President Barack Obama. When Louis Walsh suggested that the band record it, Filan, Egan, Byrne, and Feehily were against it, saying it was a church song, and would not be a success. They did not want to record it. However, they claimed in 2011, six years after the single's release, that the song changed their careers and were glad they recorded it. It was composed in the traditional verse–chorus form in E♭ major, with Filan and Feehily's vocal ranging from the chords of B♭_{2} to B♭_{4}.

Westlife's official music video for "You Raise Me Up" was directed by Alex Hemming. It is currently the most-played version on YouTube, with over 100 million views as of July 2021. The 4K version of the music video has been released on Westlife's official YouTube channel. It is also their most-streamed single of all time, with 19.7 million listens in the United Kingdom as of January 2019. It is the band's third best selling single of all-time on both paid-for and combined sales categories. It is their eighth most streamed song of all time from their home country, the Republic of Ireland, as of 2 April 2019. It is the second best-selling single of 2005 in Ireland.

The song was reinstated in the live bonus disc album of the band's Greatest Hits in 2011.

After the band broke up in 2012, the single was performed solo in many live instances by band members Shane Filan, Kian Egan and Mark Feehily. In 2018, the single was re-recorded by Filan for his solo album Love Always - Deluxe Version. On 12 May 2018, the song was performed on South Korean music programme Immortal Songs 2 by Sohyang. Filan was the featured 'Legend' and judged the participants.

=== Track listings ===
UK CD1 and European CD single

1. "You Raise Me Up" – 4:00
2. "World of Our Own" (acoustic version) – 3:30

UK CD2

1. "You Raise Me Up" – 4:00
2. "Flying Without Wings" (acoustic) – 3:30
3. "My Love" (acoustic) – 3:48

Australian CD single

1. "You Raise Me Up" – 4:00
2. "You Raise Me Up" (Chameleon Remix) – 3:17
3. "You Raise Me Up" (Reactor Remix) – 3:29
4. "Flying Without Wings" (acoustic) – 3:30
5. "My Love" (acoustic) – 3:48

=== Charts ===
==== Weekly charts ====
Chart (2005)	Peak position
Australia (ARIA)	3
Austria (Ö3 Austria Top 40)	46
Belgium (Ultratip Bubbling Under Flanders)	3
Europe (Eurochart Hot 100)	4
Finland Airplay (Radiosoittolista)	7
Germany (GfK)	11
Greece (IFPI)	38
Ireland (IRMA)	1
Netherlands (Single Top 100)	47
Norway (VG-lista)	3
Scottish Singles Sales (Official Charts)	1
South Korea (Gaon Weekly BGM Chart)	90
South Korea (Gaon Weekly Mobile (Bell) Chart)	94
Sweden (Sverigetopplistan)	7
Switzerland (Schweizer Hitparade)	18
UK Singles (Official Charts)	1
UK Airplay (Music Week)	20

==== Monthly charts ====
Chart (2015)	Peak position
South Korea (Gaon Monthly BGM Chart)	18
South Korea (Gaon Monthly Mobile (Bell) Chart)	25
South Korea (Gaon Monthly Mobile (Ring) Chart)	44

==== Year-end charts ====
Chart (2005)	Position
Europe (Eurochart Hot 100)	81
Ireland (IRMA)	1
UK Singles (OCC)	9

Chart (2006)	Position
Australia (ARIA)	14
Germany (Media Control GfK)	76
Taiwan (Hito Radio)	58

=== Certifications ===
Certifications for "You Raise Me Up"
Region	Certification	Certified units/sales
Australia (ARIA)	Platinum	70,000^{^}
Denmark (IFPI Danmark)	Gold	45,000^{‡}
Germany (BVMI)	Gold	150,000^{‡}
New Zealand (RMNZ)	Gold	15,000^{‡}
United Kingdom (BPI)	Platinum	600,000^{‡}
^{^} Shipments figures based on certification alone.^{‡} Sales+streaming figures based on certification alone.

== Wesley version ==
"You Raise Me Up"

Single by Wesley

from the album Vandaag en morgen
- Released: 4 February 2010
- Composer: Rolf Løvland
- Lyricist: Brendan Graham

Wesley singles chronology
"You Raise Me Up" (2010)	"Een ongelofelijke droom" (2010)

Music video
- "You Raise Me Up" on YouTube

On the second season of Popstars in the Netherlands, "You Raise Me Up" was recorded by each of the four finalists - Kim Stolker, Kristel Roulaux, Joshua Newton and Wesley Klein. When Klein won, his version was released as a single in the Netherlands under the mononym Wesley, peaking at No. 4 on the Dutch Top 40 and staying on the charts for eleven weeks, making it the first version of the song to reach the top 10 in the Netherlands. The song was subsequently released as the final track on his debut album Vandaag en morgen (meaning Today and Tomorrow in Dutch).

=== Weekly charts ===
Chart (2010)	Peak position
Netherlands (Dutch Top 40)	4
Netherlands (Single Top 100)	1

=== Year-end charts ===
Chart (2010)	Position
Netherlands (Dutch Top 40)	63
Netherlands (Single Top 100)	6

== See also ==
- List of Billboard Adult Contemporary number ones of 2004
