= Dean Saunders (singer) =

Dutch singer (born 1981)

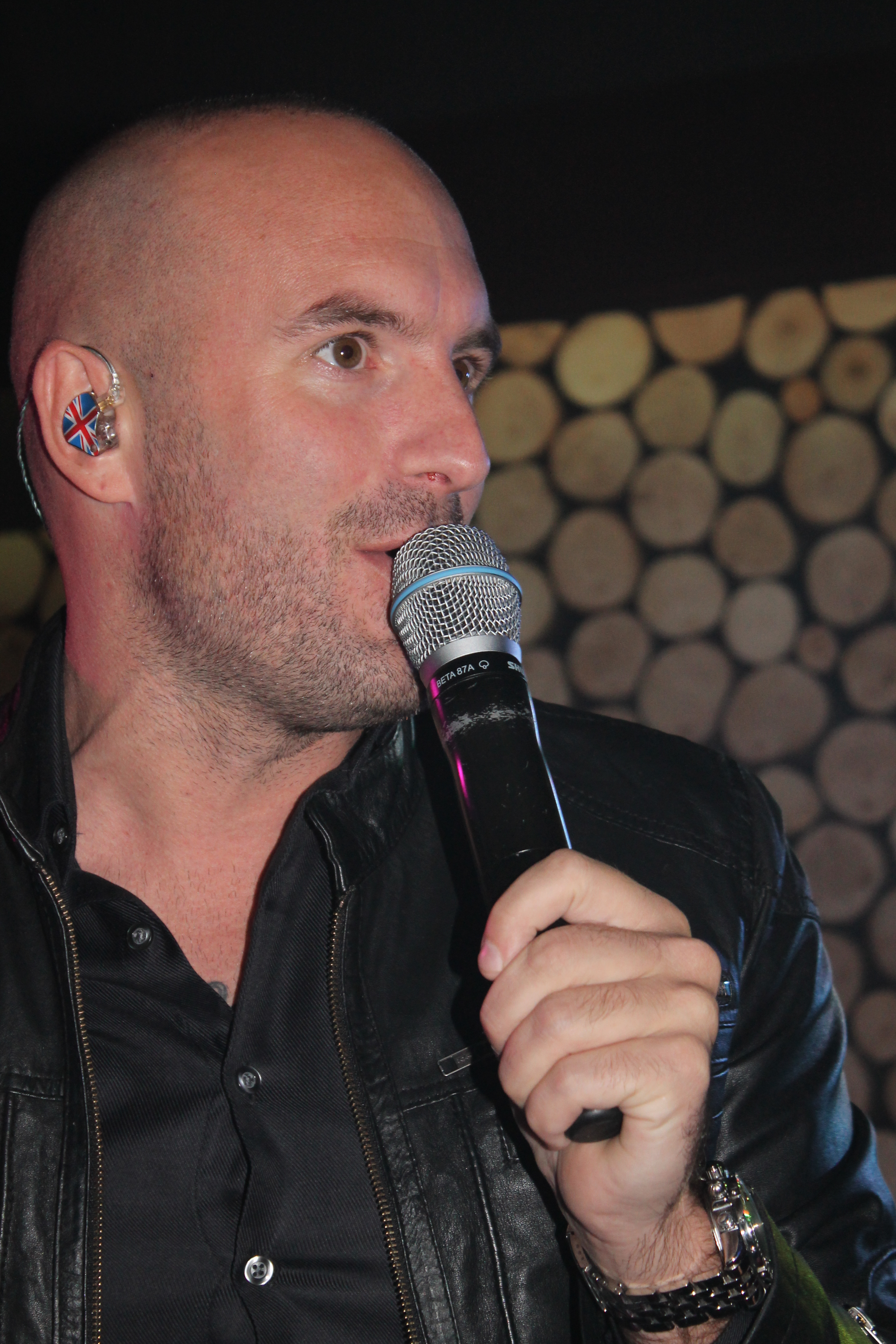
- Dean Saunders at a performance in Haaren, the Netherlands.

Background information
- Born: Dean Saunders; 9 January 1981 (age 45)
- Origin: London, England
- Occupation: singer
- Instrument: Vocals
- Years active: 1998–present

Dean Saunders (born 9 January 1981 in London) is a Dutch singer. On 22 January 2011, he won in 2011 the Dutch version of Popstars in its third season in 2010–2011.

== Career ==
He is the older brother of Ben Saunders who had won on 21 January 2011, just one day prior to Dean's win, the first ever title of the music competition The Voice of Holland.

Both Dean and his younger brother Ben started applying to talent competitions early on such as for the series Daddy's Wish. They also took part in 1998 in Life is like a box of chocolates program.

== 1998–2003: Follow That Dream ==
In 2000, Dean and Ben Saunders both took part in RTL 4's Alles voor de band: Follow that dream. They were part of the band Follow That Dream (F.T.D.) (that included besides the two brothers Vanessa Eman, Rosa Vuik, Linda van Toornburg and Peter van der Meer. The band was signed to Dino Music record label.

Their debut single the self-titled "Follow That Dream" was released in November 2000 reaching #25 in the Dutch Top 40. 6 months later, the band split after the great popularity of the rival Starmaker show.

== 2003: Eurovision Song Contest entry ==
On 15 February 2003 the Saunders brothers took part in the 2003 Dutch Nationaal Songfestival, a Dutch national music pre-selection contest for qualification to Eurovision Song Contest to be held in Riga, Latvia. They performed the song "Stand As One" in the third heat under the name "The Brothers" getting just 10 points and finishing with 3% of the popular vote as seventh out of 8 participants.

== 2010–present: Popstars ==
In 2010 he applied for the Popstars competition winning the title on 22 January 2011 against the runner-up Simone Nijssen. He got 60% of the popular vote. He released his winning song "You and I Both" originally by Jason Mraz as his debut single.

== Personal life ==
Dean Saunders was born in England in 1981. He moved to the Netherlands in 1986 when he was just 5. He resides in Velsen-Noord.

On 28 August 2014 Dean Saunders was arrested on suspicion of arson. In October 2015 he was sentenced to prison for eight months, a fine of 400 euros, and community service of 40 hours.

== Discography ==
=== Albums ===
As part of band Follow That Dream

2000: The Album on Dino Music

=== Singles ===
As part of band Follow That Dream

- 2000: "Follow That Dream"
- 2001: "One Night in Shanghai"

As The Brothers

- 2003: "Stand As One"

Solo

- 2011: "You and I Both"
