= Amazing (Westlife song) =

2006 single by Westlife

Single by Westlife

from the album Face to Face
- B-side: "Miss You When I'm Dreaming"
- Released: 20 February 2006
- Studio: The Location (Stockholm, Sweden); Grouse Lodge (Ireland)
- Length: 2:52
- Label: RCA; Sony BMG; S
- Songwriters: Kristian Lundin; Sebastian Thott; Didrik Thott; Carl Bjorsell; Carl Falk; Savan Kotecha; Jake Schulze
- Producer: Carl Falk

Westlife singles chronology
"When You Tell Me That You Love Me" (2005)	"Amazing" (2006)	"The Rose" (2006)

Music video
- "Amazing" on YouTube

"Amazing" is a song by Irish boy band Westlife. It was released on 20 February 2006 as the third and final single from their sixth studio album, Face to Face (2005). The song peaked at number four on the UK Singles Chart, making the group the first act in the history of the chart to reach the top five with each of their first 20 singles. It debuted with 16,316 sales in the UK alone.

== Track listings ==
UK CD single

1. "Amazing" (single mix)
2. "Miss You When I'm Dreaming"
3. Exclusive Westlife chat

European CD single

1. "Amazing" (single mix)
2. "Still Here"

European maxi-CD single

1. "Amazing" (single mix) – 2:49
2. "Miss You When I'm Dreaming" – 3:27
3. "Flying Without Wings" (acoustic version) – 3:30
4. "Amazing" (single mix video) – 2:49

Australian CD single

1. "Amazing" (single remix) – 2:49
2. "Miss You When I'm Dreaming" – 3:27
3. "Amazing" (single remix video) – 2:49

== Charts ==
=== Weekly charts ===
Chart (2006)	Peak position
Australia (ARIA)	34
Europe (Eurochart Hot 100)	14
Germany (GfK)	53
Ireland (IRMA)	3
Scottish Singles Sales (Official Charts)	2
Sweden (Sverigetopplistan)	36
Switzerland (Schweizer Hitparade)	58
Switzerland Airplay (Swiss Hitparade)	54
Ukraine Airplay (TopHit)	81
UK Singles (Official Charts)	4
UK Airplay (Music Week)	6

=== Year-end charts ===
Chart (2006)	Position
UK Singles (OCC)	182
