= When You Tell Me That You Love Me =

1991 single by Diana Ross

Single by Diana Ross

from the album The Force Behind the Power
- B-side: "You And I"; "Chain Reaction"
- Released: August 20, 1991
- Genre: Pop; soul
- Length: 4:14
- Label: Motown
- Songwriters: Albert Hammond; John Bettis
- Producer: Peter Asher

Diana Ross singles chronology
"Bottom Line" (1989)	"When You Tell Me That You Love Me" (1991)	"You're Gonna Love It" (1991)

Audio video
- "When You Tell Me That You Love Me" on YouTube

"When You Tell Me That You Love Me" is a song by American singer Diana Ross, released on August 20, 1991, as the lead single from her nineteenth studio album, The Force Behind the Power (1991). The song was released on the Motown label in the United States and by EMI Records in the United Kingdom. It was written by Albert Hammond and John Bettis, and produced by Peter Asher. A sentimental ballad, it became the album's biggest hit, peaking at number 37 on the US Billboard R&B singles chart and number two on the UK Singles Chart. The UK release also included her 1985 hit "Chain Reaction". Ross considers it one of her signature songs and it was subsequently covered by various artists, such as a duet between Julio Iglesias and Dolly Parton in 1994, Westlife and Ross in 2005, and Sissel Kyrkjebø and José Carreras in 2007.

== Critical reception ==
Larry Flick from Billboard magazine described the song as "a dramatically produced power ballad. Gratefully, track is less trend-conscious than Ross's more recent efforts, though this is far from her strongest work. Regardless, diehard fans will love it—as will AC radio programmers." Henderson and DeVaney from Cashbox called it a "highly commercial pop ballad" and a "slick single". In the review of the album, the magazine declared it as a "potential hit" and a "dramatic ballad". Jan DeKnock from Chicago Tribune named it the album's "strongest ballad". A reviewer from Liverpool Echo wrote, "And while Diana Ross's voice couldn't be more different, this track does have some of that radio-friendly style. It starts like a sophisticated ballad, with quiet piano and voice. and builds into an emotional climax, complete with a bit of rock guitar. It's perfectly produced and perfectly predictable." Connie Johnson from Los Angeles Times viewed it as "a gorgeously gushy ballad that’s perfect for Ross’ theatrical delivery. Peter Asher had a hand in producing this track, on which Ross manages to appear unpretentious and guilelessly sweet." Newcastle Evening Chronicle remarked the singer's "romantic mood" on the song. Stephen Holden from New York Times felt it "strongly echoes the sentiments" of "Wind Beneath My Wings".

== Music video ==
The single's accompanying music video featured scenes of Ross in an evening gown singing on stage intercut with home video footage of Ross with her two sons Ross & Evan.

== Track listings ==
- US 7-inch and cassette single

A. "When You Tell Me That You Love Me" (LP version) – 4:10
B. "You and I" – 4:05

- UK 7-inch and cassette single
1. "When You Tell Me That You Love Me" (LP version) – 4:10
2. "Chain Reaction" (single version) – 3:47
- UK 12-inch single

A1. "When You Tell Me That You Love Me" (LP version)
B1. "Chain Reaction" (12-inch version)
B2. "You and I"

- UK CD single
1. "When You Tell Me That You Love Me" (LP version)
2. "Chain Reaction" (single version)
3. "You and I"
- Japanese mini-CD single
1. "When You Tell Me That You Love Me" (LP version)
2. "Supremes Medley"

Note: "Supreme Medley" consists of five songs by the Supremes: "Baby Love", "Stop! In the Name of Love", "You Can't Hurry Love", "You Keep Me Hangin' On", and "Love Is Like an Itchin' in My Heart"

== Personnel ==
- Diana Ross: lead vocals
- Robbie Buchanan: keyboards
- Michael Landau: guitar
- Freddie Washington: bass
- Carlos Vega: drums
- Michael Fisher: percussion
- David Campbell: BV arrangements, orchestra arrangements and conductor
- Gavyn Wright: orchestra leader
- Isobel Griffiths: orchestra contractor
- Peter Asher: backing vocals
- Valerie Carter: backing vocals
- Kate Markowitz: backing vocals

== Charts ==
=== Weekly charts ===
Chart (1991–1992)	Peak position
Australia (ARIA)	83
Belgium (Ultratop 50 Flanders)	23
Canada Adult Contemporary (RPM)	34
Europe (Eurochart Hot 100)	8
Ireland (IRMA)	4
Luxembourg (Radio Luxembourg)	7
Netherlands (Dutch Top 40)	6
Netherlands (Single Top 100)	4
UK Singles (Official Charts)	2
UK Airplay (Music Week)	5
US Adult Contemporary (Billboard)	26
US Hot R&B/Hip-Hop Songs (Billboard)	37

=== Year-end charts ===
Chart (1991)	Position
UK Singles (OCC)	17

Chart (1992)	Position
Netherlands (Dutch Top 40)	32
Netherlands (Single Top 100)	44

== Certifications ==
Region	Certification	Certified units/sales
United Kingdom (BPI)	Silver	200,000^{^}
^{^} Shipments figures based on certification alone.

== Release history ==
Region	Date	Format(s)	Label(s)	Ref.
United States	August 20, 1991	—N/a	Motown	
United Kingdom	November 18, 1991	7-inch vinyl; 12-inch vinyl; CD; cassette	EMI	
Australia	December 16, 1991	CD; cassette	EMI	
Japan	June 24, 1992	Mini-CD	EMI	

== Julio Iglesias versions ==
=== With Dolly Parton ===
"When You Tell Me That You Love Me"

Single by Julio Iglesias and Dolly Parton

from the album Crazy
- Released: 1994
- Recorded: 1994
- Genre: Pop; soft rock
- Length: 3:59
- Label: Columbia
- Songwriters: Albert Hammond; John Bettis
- Producers: Albert Hammond; David Foster

Music video
- "When You Tell Me That You Love Me" on YouTube

"When You Tell Me That You Love Me" was recorded in a duet form by American singer Dolly Parton and Spanish singer Julio Iglesias for the latter's 1994 album Crazy. It was produced by Albert Hammond and David Foster, and released as a single by Columbia Records. It became a top-five hit in Brazil, and charted in the Netherlands for three weeks: entering at position 48, peaking at 45, and in its final week charting at number 49. Parton included the song on her 4-disc compilation box set, The Tour Collection.

==== Critical reception ====
L. Katz from AllMusic remarked that "Parton's vocals soar on the duet". Fell and Rufer from the Gavin Report wrote, "It's hard to beat the box office combo of a ladies' man and a man's woman. Julio and Dolly get the David Foster treatment with an expensive sounding arrangement worthy of such stars." Alan Jones from Music Week stated that Iglesias "blends well" with Dolly Parton.

==== Music video ====
The accompanying music video for "When You Tell Me That You Love Me" was directed by John Hopgood, and was filmed for the single at Oheka Castle on Long Island's north shore. The sepia-toned clip features Iglesias and Parton singing in separate rooms and a love scene involving a younger couple. At the end of the video, Parton and Iglesias are shown leaving the castle. Parton having changed from a white nightgown into a black cocktail dress.

==== Charts ====
Chart (1994–1995)	Peak position
Brazil (UPI)	5
Netherlands (Mega Top 50)	45

=== With CoCo Lee ===
In 1998, Iglesias re-recorded the duet with Chinese singer Coco Lee (李玟) and released it as a single to promote his compilation My Life: The Greatest Hits. Despite this, CoCo Lee's version was not included on the actual album, but rather Parton's. A music video was released featuring Iglesias and Lee singing together in a recording studio intercut with scenes of Lee walking around in a trench coat. At the end of the video Iglesias and Lee sit down to a candlelit dinner.

== Westlife version ==
"When You Tell Me That You Love Me"

Single by Westlife and Diana Ross

from the album Face to Face
- Released: December 12, 2005
- Studio: A Side, Kingside (Stockholm, Sweden); Sanctuary Townhouse (London, England); Larrabee North (Los Angeles)
- Genre: Pop
- Length: 3:58
- Label: Sony BMG
- Songwriters: Hammond and Bettis

Westlife singles chronology
"You Raise Me Up" (2005)	"When You Tell Me That You Love Me" (2005)	"Amazing" (2006)

Music video
- "When You Tell Me That You Love Me" on YouTube

CD2

"When You Tell Me That You Love Me" is the second single released from Westlife's sixth studio album, Face to Face (2005). It features vocals from original artist Diana Ross. The single peaked at No. 2 on the UK Singles Chart, just losing out on the top spot by a mere 171 copies. The song was the 39th-best-selling single of 2005 in the UK. It debuted with 40,708 combined physical and download sales in the UK alone. The single reached 120 000 copies sold in UK so far. This single marked its fourteenth year since the original Diana Ross version was released and peaked at No. 2, the same chart position in the UK Singles Chart in 1991.

It missed becoming the Christmas Single for 2005 by just 170 units, as had happened to the original. It also peaked at No. 2 in Ireland and Scotland. It is the band's nineteenth best selling single in paid-for sales category and in best selling single combined sales category in the United Kingdom as of January 2019.

=== Music video ===
The video features Westlife and Ross singing on a stage together. The members of Westlife are wearing dark suits whilst Ross wears a long white dress and later in the video, a gold dress. New excerpts from the music video with Ross, that didn't make the cut on the official video, were used on television performances by the band of the song for the premiere promotional release week of it as a single.

=== Track listing ===
- UK CD1
1. "When You Tell Me That You Love Me" (Single Mix) – 4:01
2. "White Christmas" – 3:34
3. "The Way You Look Tonight" (Westlife Only Version) – 4:07
- UK CD2
1. "When You Tell Me That You Love Me" (Single Mix) – 4:00
2. "If I Let You Go" (Acoustic Version) – 3:40

=== Charts ===
==== Weekly charts ====
Chart (2005)	Peak position
Ireland (IRMA)	2
Netherlands (Single Top 100)	45
Scottish Singles Sales (Official Charts)	2
Ukraine Airplay (TopHit)	123
UK Singles (Official Charts)	2
UK Singles Downloads (Official Charts)	35

==== Year-end charts ====
Chart (2005)	Position
UK Singles (OCC)	51

== American Idol finalists - Season 4 version ==
The 12 American Idol finalists of season 4 got together perform this song. It was selected as the American Red Cross Disaster Relief Single in 2005 for the American Idol TV show. It also appears on the American Idol Season 4: The Showstoppers compilation album. Their version topped the Canadian Singles Chart for six weeks in mid-2005.

== Sissel Kyrkjebø and José Carreras version ==
In 2007, Norwegian singer Sissel Kyrkjebø and Spanish singer José Carreras recorded the song as a duet in English and Spanish as "Quando Sento Che Mi Ami" (in English: "When You Tell Me That You Love Me"). It was featured on the album Northern Lights, which was released by Kyrkjebø in 2007.
