= Elst, Belgium =

Elst
- Village
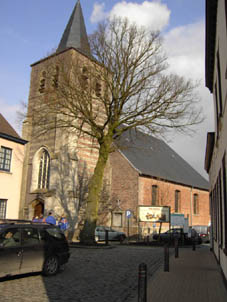
- Saint Apollonia Church of Elst (2004)

- Location in Belgium
- Coordinates: 50.830°N 3.739°E
- Country: Belgium
- Region: Flemish Region
- Province: East Flanders
- Municipality: Brakel

Area
  - Total: 5.16 km^{2} (1.99 sq mi)

Population (2021)
  - Total: 1,143
  - Density: 222/km^{2} (574/sq mi)
- Time zone: CET

Elst is a village belonging to the municipality of Brakel. It is located in the Denderstreek in the province East Flanders in Belgium.

== Overview ==
The village was mentioned in 977 as Elsuth. There are two mills in the village. The oldest is the Perlinckmolen, an overshot watermill, which originated from before 898, and is one of the oldest in Belgium. The current mill was reconstructed in 1571. In 1859, it was severely damaged in a storm. In 1974, it stopped operations, and was declared a monument the next year.

The Leberg is located in the village. It is a steep 99 metre hill, and has become known as a significant obstacle in the Tour of Flanders.

Elst is known for its Geutelingen, a kind of pancake.

== Gallery ==
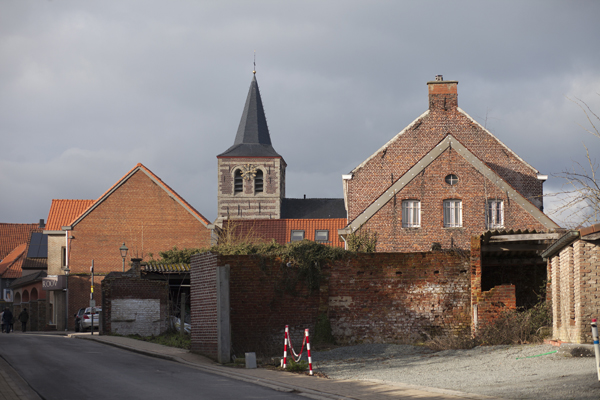
View on Elst

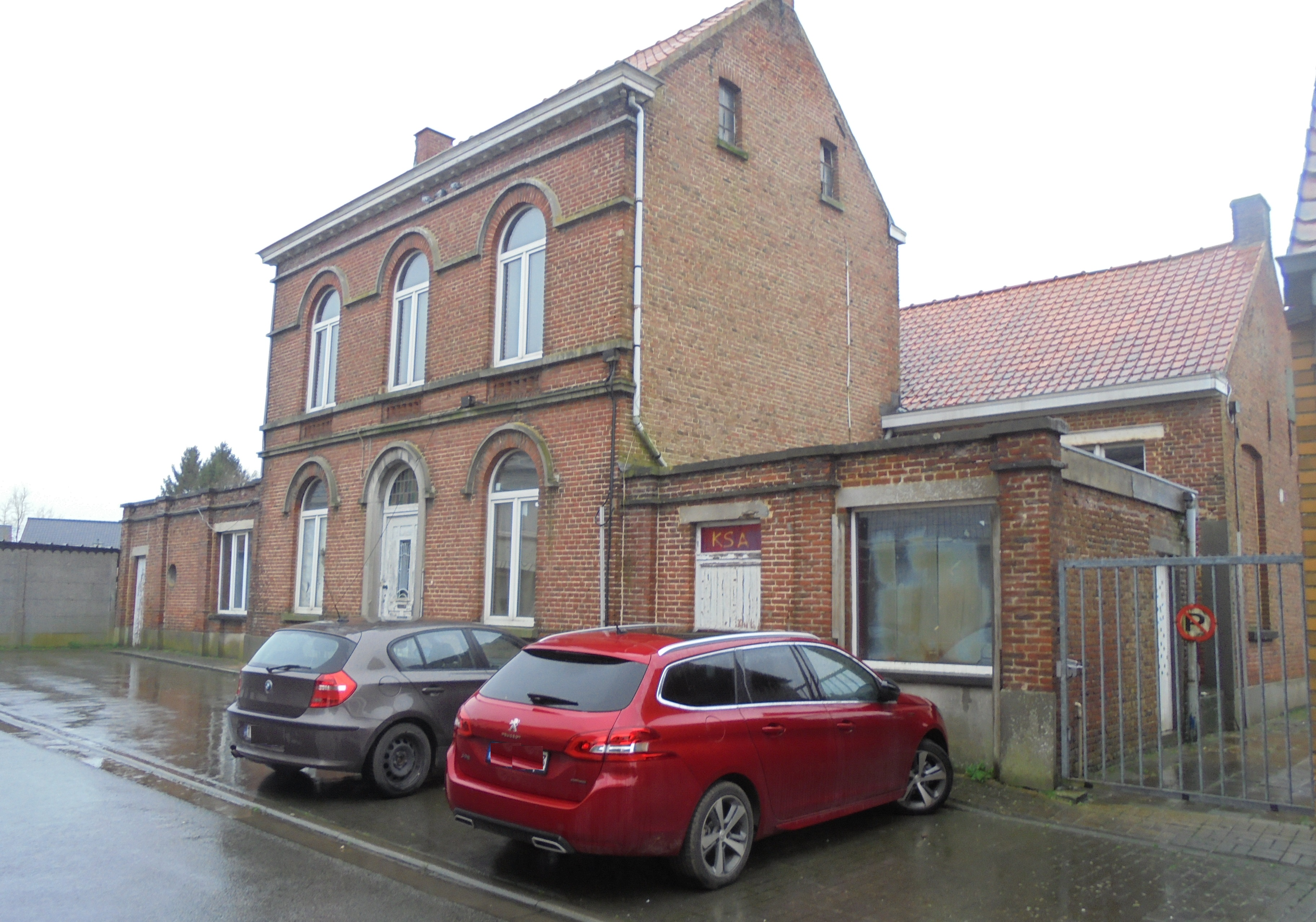
Former boys school

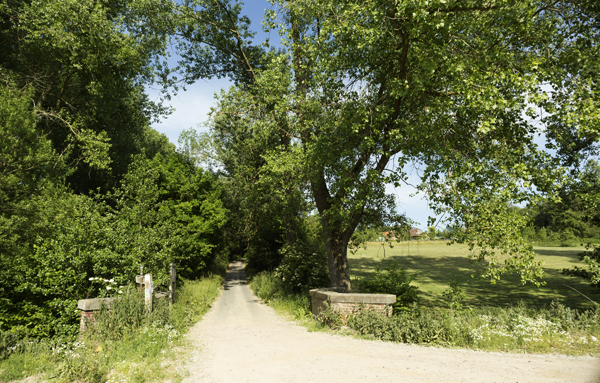
Landscape around Elst

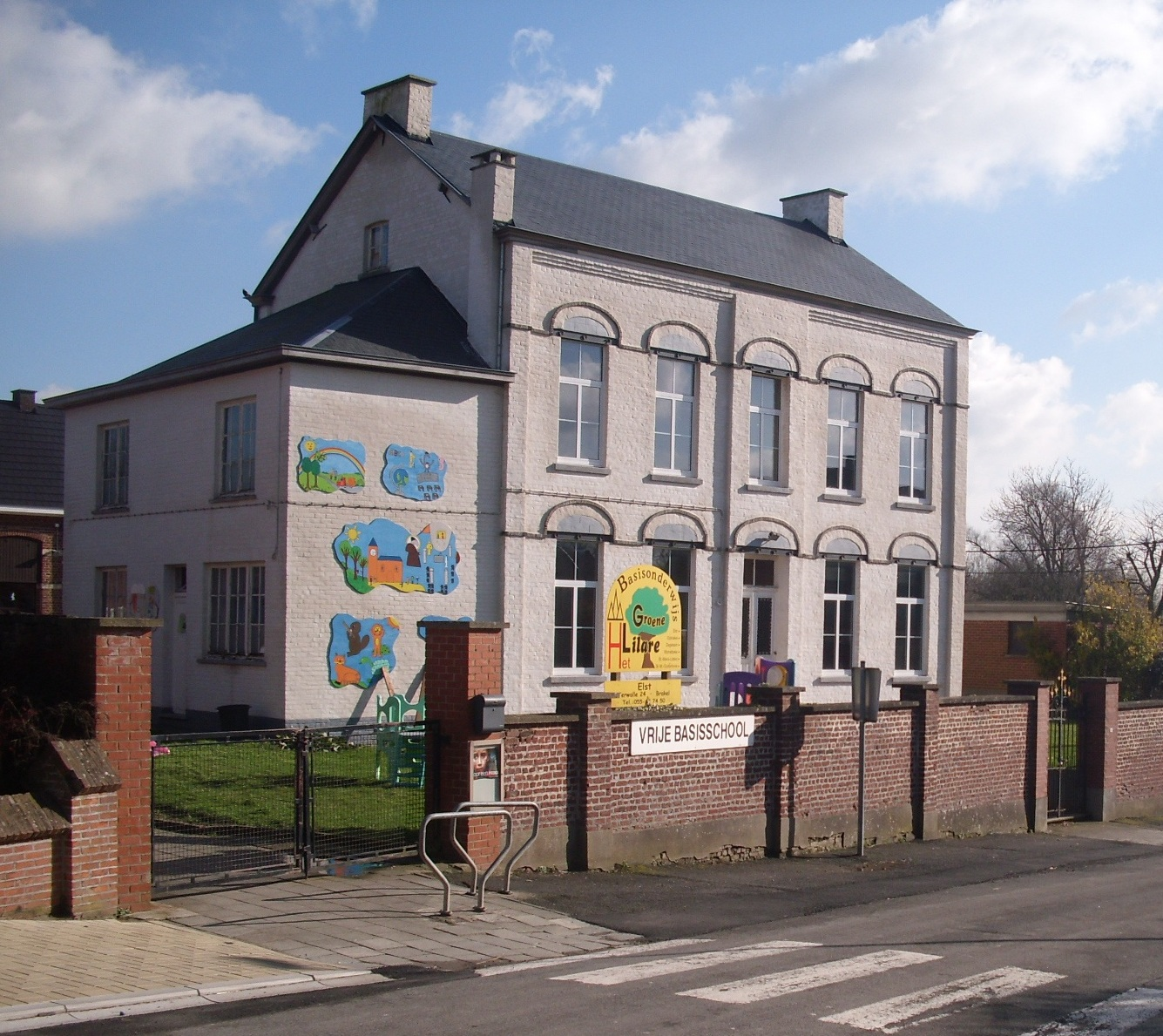
School in Elst
