= Popstars (Dutch TV series) =

Dutch talent show

- Genre: Reality, talent show
- Judges: Henkjan Smits; Maurice Wijnen; Simone Walraven; Marc-Marie Huijbregts
- Voices of: Nance Coolen (all rounds); Gerard Joling (auditions); Tooske Ragas (liveshows)
- Country of origin: Netherlands
- Original language: Dutch

Original release
- Network: SBS6
- Release: 22 August 2008

Popstars is a singing competition series in the Netherlands. The first season started on 22 August 2008. A second season was aired for 2009-2010 and third season aired in 2010-2011. The winners in season 1 were RED! made up of the three finalist winners Brandi Russell, Steffie Zoontjes and Deon Leon. Wesley Klein won in season 2 and Dean Saunders in season 3.

The precursor of these shows was the Dutch version of Popstars: The Rivals broadcast on RTL 4 in 2004 hosted by Beau van Erven Dorens. The series was won by the boy band Men2B (male category) and girl band Raffish (female category). Both disbanded in 2006.

== Summary ==
| Season | Year | Presenter | Jury | Winner(s) | Runner-up | Other competitors Final position (in order of elimination) |
|---|---|---|---|---|---|---|
| Season 1 | 2008 | Nance Coolen; Gerard Joling | Henkjan Smits; Patricia Paay; Maurice Wijnen | 1. Brandi Russell; 1. Steffie Zoontjes; 1. Deon Leon; forming the trio RED! | 4. Norman Ramazan | 10. Ruben Thurnim; 9. Nathalie Mensinga; 8. Naomi Reingoud; 7. Rebecca Schouw; 6. Floor Krijnen; 5. Sidney McWood |
| Season 2 | 2009-2010 | Nance Coolen; Gerard Joling | Henkjan Smits; Patricia Paay; Maurice Wijnen | 1. Wesley Klein | 2. Kim Stolker | 12. Michelle Komproe; 12. Jeffrey Sabeel; 12. Davy Oonincx; 11. Xander Venema; 10. Emmily Lasut; 9. Mandy Gruijters; 8. Robin Zijlstra; 7. Charlotte ten Brink; 6. Bart Boonstra; 5. Dewi Pechler; 4. Joshua Newton; 3. Kristel Roulaux |
| Season 3 | 2010-2011 | Nance Coolen; Gerard Joling; Tooske Ragas | Henkjan Smits; Marc-Marie Huijbregts; Simone Walraven; Maurice Wijnen | 1. Dean Saunders | 2. Simone Nijssen | 14. Valerie Van Krimpen; 13. Samantha Jaine; 12. Ephraim Beks; 11. Rene Klein; 10. Søren Jørgensen; 6. Sam Lebens; 6. Rody Valks; 6. Bertha Verbeek; 6. Angela Slagt; 5. Carlijn Middelhof; 4. Darien Solange Kastaneer; 3. Sharon Kips |

== Season 1 (2008) ==
Participants and elimination table

Legend
| Women | Men | Sing-off (SO) | Top 10 |

| Ronde: | | Liveshows | | | | | |
| Week: | | 14/11 | 21/11 | 28/11 | 5/12 | 12/12 | 19/12 |
| Plek | Kandidaat | Results | | | | | |
| 1 | Brandi Russell (26) | | | | | | Winner |
| 2 | Steffie Zoontjes (18) | | | SO | | | Winner |
| 3 | Deon Leon (18) | | | | SO | | Winner |
| 4 | Norman Ramazan (24) | | | | | SO | Elim |
| 5 | Sidney McWood (17) | | SO | | | SO | Elim |
| 6 | Floor Krijnen (18) | | SO | SO | SO | Elim | |
| 7 | Rebecca Schouw (27) | | | | Elim | | |
| 8 | Naomi Reingoud (24) | | | Elim | | | |
| 9 | Nathalie Mensinga (21) | | Elim | | | | |
| 10 | Ruben Thurnim (33) | Elim | | | | | |

== Season 2 (2009-2010) ==
Participants and elimination table:

Legend
| Women | Men | Wild Card (WC) | Sing-off (SO) | Proximity (pr) | Top 14 |

| Round: | | Wildcard | | Liveshows | | | | | | | | |
| Week: | | 20/11 | 21/11 | 20/11 | 27/11 | 4/12 | 11/12 | 18/12 | 1/1 | 15/1 | 22/1 | 29/1 |
| Position | Candidate | Results | | | | | | | | | | |
| 1 | Wesley Klein (21) | | | | | | | | | | | Winner |
| 2 | Kim Stolker (22) | | | | | | | | | | | Runner-up |
| 3 | Kristel Roulaux (26) | | | | | | | | | | | Elim |
| 4 | Joshua Newton (23) | | | | | SO | | | | | | Elim |
| 5 | Dewi Pechler (26) | | | | SO | | | | pr | | Elim | |
| 6 | Bart Boonstra (24) | | | | | | SO | | pr | pr | Elim | |
| 7 | Charlotte ten Brink (21) | | | | | | SO | SO | | Elim | | |
| 8 | Robin Zijlstra (29) | | | | SO | | SO | | Elim | | | |
| 9 | Mandy Gruijters (29) | | | | | pr | | Elim | | | | |
| 10 | Emmily Lasut (15) | | | | | | Elim | | | | | |
| 11 | Xander Venema (24) | | | | | Elim | | | | | | |
| 12 | Davy Oonincx (19) | | | | Elim | | | | | | | |
| 12 | Jeffrey Sabeel (22) | | WC | | Elim | | | | | | | |
| 12 | Michelle Komproe (20) | WC | | | Elim | | | | | | | |

== Season 3 (2010-2011) ==
The schedules for season 3 were as follows:

- 9 Auditions: 9, 16, 23 and 30 July 2010, 6, 13, 20 and 27 August 2010 and 10 September 2010
- 6 Continued rounds: 17 and 24 September 2010, 1, 11, 18 and 25 October 2010
- Top 25 solos: 1 November 2010
- 2 Selection liveshows 1: 8 and 15 November 2010
- 6 Liveshows: 22 and 29 November 2010, 6, 13, 20 and 27 December 2010

The hosts were Nancy Coolen (all rounds), Gerard Joling (only during auditions) and Tooske Ragas (only during liveshows).

Participants: The winner of the third season was Dean Saunders, with Simone Nijssen as runner-up. Final classification:

- 1. Dean Saunders - winner
- 2. Simone Nijssen
- 3. Sharon Kips
- 4. Darien Solange Kastaneer
- 5. Carlijn Middelhof
- 6. Angela Slagt
- 6. Bertha Verbeek
- 6. Rody Valks
- 6. Sam Lebens
- 10. Søren Jørgensen
- 11. René Klein
- 12. Ephraim Beks
- 13. Samantha Klumper
- 14. Valerie Van Krimpen

== Discography ==
=== Singles ===
| Single title | Release date | Charting in the Dutch Top 40 | | | Comments |
| Single title | Release date | Date of entry | Highest | Weeks | Comments |
|---|---|---|---|---|---|
| (RED!) Step Into the Light | 19-12-2008 | 27-12-2008 | tip2 | - | #1 in de Single Top 100 |
| (RED!) Guilty | 01-05-2009 | - | | | |
| (RED!) Conga | 11-07-2009 | - | | | #42 in de Single Top 100 |
| (Wesley Klein) You Raise Me Up | 29-01-2010 | 13-02-2010 | 4 | 11 | #1 in de Single Top 100 |
| (Rebecca Schouw) All Your Talk | 15-03-2010 | - | | | #91 in de Single Top 100 |
| (Wesley Klein) Een ongelofelijke droom | 19-03-2010 | 03-04-2010 | tip2 | - | #2 in de Single Top 100 |
| (Dean Saunders) You and I Both | 22-01-2011 | 05-02-2011 | 22 | 4 | #1 in de Single Top 100 |

== See also ==
- So You Wanna Be a Popstar (Netherlands)
