= Cursed (Scaramanga Six album) =

Studio album by the Scaramanga Six
- Released: 2011
- Genre: Alternative rock; art rock
- Length: 50:03
- Label: Wrath
- Producer: Alan Smyth

The Scaramanga Six chronology
Hot Flesh Rumble – The Scaramanga Six Live in Session (2008)	Cursed (2011)	Phantom Head (2013)

Cursed is the sixth album by English rock band the Scaramanga Six.

== Background ==
The songs for Cursed were originally intended for what would have been the fifth Scaramanga Six album, A Pound of Flesh. This album was scheduled for recording in 2006 with producer Tim Smith, who'd produced the band's third and fourth albums. Versions of tracks were recorded and a single, "Walking Through Houses", released before Smith was felled by a disastrous combined heart attack and stroke, leaving him unable to continue. Having become close friends with Smith, the band felt unable to replace him and complete the album sessions, later admitting "we simply couldn't go back to these recordings without him and recoiled to contemplate what to do next."

The initial solution was for the Scaramanga Six to write and record a new album of new songs, which duly became 2009's Songs of Prey album. ("We wanted to pay tribute to the man who had inspired us and felt that to carry on with as much bombast as possible was the best way.") The band hoped to wait and resurrect the uncompleted Pound of Flesh work once Smith had recovered. However, when the devastating long-term effects of Smith's condition ensured that it was unlikely that this plan could be carried out, Steven and Paul Morricone opted to revisit the Pound of Flesh songs in 2010, finding a way of making use of the existing songwriting while honouring the memory of Smith and the original sessions.

In 2011, Steven recalled the process as follows: "As we started bashing out new songs we knew that something wasn’t quite right – there was a feeling of unresolve. We had 'a lost album' and it suddenly hit us all. Could we simply ignore the wealth of music and love we had created with Sir Tim? No… It felt strange at first. These were songs we had heard over and over a few years before and we were playing them all again. But instead of a turgid process of replication we found ourselves reigniting the flame we had then adding more and more to it." The Morricones reworked and rewrote the songs as new versions, then recorded them in new sessions at 2fly Studios in Sheffield produced by Alan Smyth (Pulp, Arctic Monkeys, Richard Hawley and others).

Cursed was also the most expansively-arranged Scaramanga Six album for many years, with the Morricone brothers’ saxophones bolstered by trumpet and trombone (recorded at the original Smith sessions), live strings, and additional keyboards played by former member Chris Catalyst. New York singer-songwriter and instrument inventor Thomas Truax also made a guest appearance, playing three of his own instruments – the Hornicator, the String-a-Ling and the mysterious Dracula's Eyeball. Apart from the brass tracks, the only recording retained from the Smith sessions was "Walking Through Houses" which the Morricones decided "had to stay as it was".

== Reception ==
Manchester Music dubbed Cursed "a worthy contender for anyone’s album of the year", commenting "whilst it’s missing the important infusion of Smith’s dark art, the band have enough of their own musical black magic, as has Smyth... Just feel the writhing, scratching intro and satisfying bass growl of "Damned If You Don't, Damned If You Do" – like all the tracks here the skilled pop infusions and progressive nuances complete a perfect recipe... Their long standing punk sensibility hasn't been lost on them either with "Trouble" (and later on in the proceedings via the catchy and impossibly addictive "The Repo Man"). This all makes a valiant effort to blow up your speakers – let's not forget their sense of the theatrical on an instrumental that is aptly titled "Dark Matter"."

== Track listing ==
All tracks are written by Paul Morricone/Steven Morricone

No.	Title	Length
1.	"Last Roll of the Dice"	4:52
2.	"Damned if You Don't, Damned if You Do"	2:27
3.	"Rest in Peace"	4:44
4.	"Walking Through Houses"	4:40
5.	"Trouble"	3:52
6.	"Autopsy of the Mind"	5:24
7.	"Dark Matter"	4:13
8.	"I Can See a Murder"	4:33
9.	"The Repo Man"	1:28
10.	"Quite the Man About Town"	4:59
11.	"Like an Insect"	4:47
12.	"Spent Force"	4:02

== Personnel ==
=== The Scaramanga Six ===
- Paul Morricone – vocals, electric & acoustic guitars, baritone saxophone, Suzuki Q-chord, Wasp synthesizer, glockenspiel
- Steven Morricone – vocals, bass guitar, piano, electric piano, organ, harpsichord, tenor saxophone, dulcimer, xylophone, flexatone
- Julia Arnez– guitars, vocals
- Gareth Champion – drums

=== Guest musicians ===
- Chris Catalyst – piano, electric piano, second drumkit
- Thomas Truax – Hornicator, String-a-Ling, Dracula's Eyeball
- Leslie Turner – violin
- Lins Wilson – cello
- Pat "Herb" Fulgoni – trumpet
- Rob Paul Chapman – trombone
- "Some crows" – cawing
