= Scenes of Mild Peril =

Scenes of Mild Peril – The Scaramanga Six Live in Session 2013–2014

Compilation album by the Scaramanga Six
- Released: 204
- Genre: Alternative rock; art rock; psychobilly
- Length: 61:59
- Label: Wrath
- Producer: Paul Morricone; Steven Morricone

The Scaramanga Six chronology
| Phantom Head (2013) | Scenes of Mild Peril – The Scaramanga Six Live in Session 2013–2014 (204) | The Terrifying Dream (2015) |

Scenes of Mild Peril – The Scaramanga Six Live in Session 2013–2014 is a compilation album/DVD by English rock band the Scaramanga Six. It is the band's second sessions album, following 2008's Hot Flesh Rumble.

== Background ==
The tracks on the album were recorded in two sessions; the first at The Lodge, Bridlington on 12 January 2013, the second in Brixton Hill Studios, London, on 26 April 2014. The Brixton session featured the standard Scaramanga quartet of the Morricone brothers, Julia Arnez and Gareth Champion, while the earlier Bridlington session featured the six-piece lineup which recorded 2013's Phantom Head album and which added Stephen Gilchrist on second drumkit and James Kenosha on piano. Both Kenosha and Gilchrist were also involved in production, with Kenosha recording and mixing the Bridlington session and Gilchrist recording the Brixton session (which was mixed by Mark Cawthra).

The DVD contains full audio-visual footage of the songs from the two sessions, while the CD only contains the soundtrack recording.

The album features four new songs - "Arabella", "The Man Who Couldn't Sing", "The Cakey Song" and "Pulling Teeth from a Phantom Head".

== Track listing ==
All tracks are written by Paul Morricone/Steven Morricone.

| No. | Title | Length |
|---|---|---|
| 1. | "The Stepford Bands" | 5:29 |
| 2. | "You Should Have Killed Me When You Had the Chance" | 3:10 |
| 3. | "Missing" | 4:24 |
| 4. | "Blunt Force Trauma" | 3:50 |
| 5. | "The Man Who Couldn't Sing" | 5:14 |
| 6. | "Arabella" | 5:09 |
| 7. | "Seven Chances" | 4:09 |
| 8. | "I Can See a Murder" | 4:17 |
| 9. | "The Cakey Song" | 3:03 |
| 10. | "Misadventure" | 3:40 |
| 11. | "Unclean" | 3:44 |
| 12. | "Pulling Teeth from a Phantom Head" | 3:20 |
| 13. | "I Am the Rain" | 4:48 |
| 14. | "It's Just a Matter of Time" | 6:54 |

== Personnel ==
- Paul Morricone – vocals, guitar
- Steven Morricone – vocals, bass guitar, piano (tracks 1, 2, 5–12)
- Julia Arnez – guitar, vocals
- Gareth Champion – drums
- James Kenosha – piano (tracks 3, 4, 13 & 14 only)
- Stephen Gilchrist – second drumkit (tracks 3, 4, 13 & 14 only)
