= Songs of Prey =

Studio album by the Scaramanga Six
- Released: 20 April 2009
- Genre: Alternative rock; art rock; psychobilly
- Length: 55:12
- Label: Wrath
- Producer: James Kenosha

The Scaramanga Six chronology
Hot Flesh Rumble – The Scaramanga Six Live in Session (2008)	Songs of Prey (2009)	Cursed (2011)

Songs of Prey is the fifth album by English rock group the Scaramanga Six and the first to feature the band’s long-term drummer Gareth Champion.

== Background ==
Having enjoyed a fruitful working relationship with Tim Smith (who’d produced their third and fourth albums), the Scaramanga Six planned to record their projected fifth album A Pound of Flesh with him. Songs were written and initial sessions recorded before the process was cut short by Smith’s crippling heart attack and stroke in 2006. Out of loyalty to Smith, and hoping to complete the work with him once he’d recovered, the band shelved the sessions and wrote a new set of songs for a replacement sixth album.

In an e-mail newsletter to the band's mailing list on 17 October 2008, band spokesman Steven Morricone explained "The news was a dreadful shock to people, especially to his many close friends. Tim is now starting out on a long road to recovery and we can only wish him and everyone close to him the greatest of strength and resolve in this very difficult time. If love alone is all that is needed for recovery there is certainly no shortage for Tim. With this in mind, we decided to postpone work on A Pound of Flesh for the near future. We will return to it one day when Tim is better." (The songs for A Pound of Flesh were eventually revisited, reworked and re-recorded as the band’s sixth album Cursed.)

The replacement songs were recorded in sessions with James Kenosha (a producer and multi-instrumentalist who’d briefly also served as the band’s drummer in 2006) by a quartet of the Morricone brothers, Julia Arnez and Gareth Champion (following the autumn 2008 departure of multi-instrumentalist Chris Catalyst). Songs of Prey was released on 20 April 2009, with the band playing a short British tour (plus an appearance in Denmark) to promote it. On 13 June, the band announced the release of promotional video clips for two of the songs from the album - "Misadventure" and "Back To School".

== Reception ==
Like its predecessor, Songs of Prey was well received by the press. The Huddersfield Examiner hailed it as "all you might expect from the Scaramanga Six – dark, brooding, witty pop rock", noting "a more sparse and bleak arrangement than usual" but commenting that the songs "have not lost the grandiose bombast the ‘Six’ are famous for." The Yorkshire Evening Post described Songs of Prey as "a riff-heavy, ballsy heavy rock album that mixes up the stirring bombast of Rainbow and the compelling muscularity of Queens Of The Stone Age, yet still throws in enough musical and lyrical curveballs to lift it out of the ordinary. With vocals that are part dive-bar crooner and part righteous rocker, theatrical overtones and gothic undercurrents, the album is overblown, intense and great fun."

This Is Fake DIY described the album as "cinematic art-rock that combines thrashing guitars with orchestral and distinctly non-rock instruments to create something individual and that has instant replay value... This is pop music that's not only absurd but pop music that's aware of the inherent absurdities of creating pop music. Yes, there's moments where you feel that the most appropriate action to take whilst listening to the record is to thrust your fist in the air in a stadium rock fashion, but somehow this bombast is endearing, where we would expect it to be off-putting."

On the Leeds Music Scene website, reviewer Alexander Rennie commented "Who else asks 'If you believe the lamb can lie beside the lion / Then you're only lyin' to yourself' (as they do in "You Should Have Killed Me...") and expects you to carry on listening?... Listening to a Scaramanga album is engaging throughout, thanks largely to the high level of musicianship. And the showmanship, meanwhile, never feels forced… The rock posturing is tremendously good fun and the sound is often that of a band enjoying themselves whilst blowing a hearty raspberry in the direction of anyone taking life too seriously… There might be some silly stuff thrown into the mix, but it would be a radically different world in which the Scaramanga Six were entirely straight faced for nearly an hour. After all, there's an awful lot of pomposity out there in need of a damn good puncturing. And in that regard these guys are unquestionably the dudes for the gig."

In Contact Music, Natalie Kaye noted "The key thing is with this band is that they've never taken themselves too seriously. The pompous, blown-up music/lyrics are complemented by Paul and Steven's deadpan delivery, so it never becomes too overbearing to listen to. They pack a strong punch of wailing crescendos ("Self Destruct") and sweeping harmonies ("Hole in My Emotion") that deliver swiftly to the gut. In a nutshell, the Scaramanga Six are doing what they've always done best. If you're looking for subtle nuances or minimalism you should probably go elsewhere. But if you want straight up, out and proud rock, then look no further."

== Track listing ==
All tracks are written by Paul Morricone/Steven Morricone.

No.	Title	Length
1.	"Hole in My Emotion"	6:41
2.	"Self Destruct"	3.58
3.	"I Didn’t Get Where I Am Today"	3:00
4.	"You Should Have Killed Me When You Had the Chance"	2.59
5.	"Song of Prey #1"	0:42
6.	"Misadventure"	3:46
7.	"Another Coward"	5:43
8.	"Groom of the Stool"	5:12
9.	"Song of Prey #2"	1:11
10.	"Back to School"	2:19
11.	"Sophia in Blue"	3:57
12.	"The Twentieth of Hell"	4:03
13.	"By-Product"	5:42
14.	"Pink & Blue"	5:49

== Personnel ==
=== The Scaramanga Six ===
- Paul Morricone – vocals, guitars, baritone saxophone
- Steven Morricone – vocals, bass guitar, tenor saxophone
- Julia Arnez– guitars, vocals
- Gareth Champion - drums

=== Guest musicians ===
- Rhodri Marsden – musical saw
