= Chronica (album) =

Studio album by the Scaramanga Six
- Released: 2017
- Genre: Alternative rock; art rock; psychobilly
- Length: 89:45
- Label: Wrath
- Producer: Alan Smyth

The Scaramanga Six chronology
The Terrifying Dream (2015)	Chronica (2017)	Worthless Music (2021)

Chronica is the ninth album by English rock group the Scaramanga Six (and the band's first double album).

== Background ==
Work on what would become Chronica was begun in early 2016 and continued over a year-and-a-half of intermittent sessions in Sheffield with producer/engineer Alan Smyth, during which the Scaramanga Six wrote and recorded enough material to consider releasing a double album. Having decided to make this commitment, the band then opened up the funding arrangements to their fanbase as their second PledgeMusic project (following 2015's The Terrifying Dream), including download, CD and vinyl releases.

The band described Chronica as "an abstract story roughly hewn from a concept of a dystopian island society. A place where everything has fallen into ruin, yet people still seem to have the same preoccupation with the trivial crap they had before. The population trudge through a chaotic existence on top of each other with absolutely no hope of a better life. Society is reduced to its base behaviour yet people still crave superficial fixes. The human condition carries on regardless. There is no outcome, no lessons to be learned. Familiar?... Rest assured that this is the most thorough, intense and well-executed album to date by the Scaramanga Six. Truly an album that you will be able to inhabit, whose twists, turns and secrets will be revealed with every further listen. To say that we are proud of this record would be understating things to the power of infinity. We’ve been filled with pride at the conception and often difficult births of all our aural offspring over the years, and I know you’re not supposed to have favourites, but we feel this time we’ve delivered a set of twins whose magnificence eclipses all our previous works. Twenty-two tracks of wilful weirdness over an hour and a half will take you on a bewildering rampage across the Chronic Isle."

== Reception ==
Writing in Classic Rock, Kris Needs hailed Chronica as "a colossal undertaking from outside the mainstream well worth investigation" and noted "prone to big riffs with sudden detours, there are shades of Bowie and Hammill in the animated narrative which often find themselves abseiling over episodic, prog-like bombast, maybe tickling modern Marillion's testicles before uncorking something bigger of their own devising.Controlled dynamite outbursts like 'This is Chronica' with its strident Mick Ronson-style guitar, or sinister monologue 'A Cold One at Wits' End' fly relentless invention with subtle humour, thus preventing such complex words and music flying up Muse's cosmic poop chute."

Reviewer Steven Reid covered the album for both Fireworks and Sea of Tranquillity. In his review for Fireworks, Reid commented "concept albums are all the rage, space-age themes hoping to comment on a grand scale being the order of the day. Not for the Scaramanga Six, this foursome bundling you into the boot of their car and laughing as you tumble into the land of Chronica. Yes, The Scarras have created a world to tell their stories, but the big picture they want reveal is one full of the insignificances we encounter every day... The Scaramanga Six have created more than a double album here, they've created a world. It isn't prog rock, but 'Chronica' may well be the most Progressive album I've heard all year."

For his Sea of Tranquillity review, Reid added "it's maybe all a bit mad, but it's a good mad, a welcoming mad, a reassuringly bonkers of a hatstand. And yet it's not, these tracks, split across two discs of ever shifting landscapes and trivialities that make the world go round, being honed, crafted and precise. Highlights don't just come thick and fast, they rush at you as though you're the main character in an action movie made of plasticine and dynamite... The superb production allows the crazy to sound cohesive and the pace at which you're presented ideas that remind of everything from Buffalo Tom and Hüsker Dü to The Dead Kennedys and The Cardiacs via XTC and King Crimson to The Knack and Abba, to simply be the Scaramanga Six. If you want pop, you got it. Rock? We got that too. Prog? Yeah, sure thing, it's in the corner necking with punk and trying to form a band with indie-pop... Doff your cap. Few bands could pull this off. Fewer would even try. The Scaramanga Six have created more than a double album here, they've created a world. One that's immediately recognisable and simultaneously remote and one that's worryingly like and unlike the one you and I are standing on right now."

== Track listing ==
=== Disc 1 - "Chronica Part I" ===
All tracks are written by Paul Morricone/Steven Morricone

No.	Title	Length
1.	"The Narnials of Chronica"	0:52
2.	"Somehow"	4:53
3.	"As We Take the Stage"	5:46
4.	"The Caretaker"	4:57
5.	"Man or Marionette"	3:25
6.	"Owned"	6:53
7.	"Bark or Bite"	1:07
8.	"What's the Time Mr. Wolf?"	3:42
9.	"Can't Stop Won't Stop"	4:14
10.	"This is Chronica"	7:42

=== Disc 2 - "Chronica Part II" ===
All tracks are written by Paul Morricone/Steven Morricone

No.	Title	Length
1.	"Flying Bastards"	1:51
2.	"Fight or Flight"	3:00
3.	"Dirty Subaru"	2:19
4.	"Stabby Fork"	4:35
5.	"The Apartment"	1:55
6.	"Cheap Guitar"	4:37
7.	"A Cold One at the Wits' End"	3:39
8.	"Splendour's Faded Homeless"	5:04
9.	"Human Oddity"	4:02
10.	"The Creeps"	3:20
11.	"My Pet Hate"	5:05
12.	"Soaring"	4:46

== Personnel ==
- Paul Morricone – vocals, guitars, keyboards, baritone saxophone, etc.
- Steven Morricone – vocals, bass guitar, keyboards, tenor saxophone, etc.
- Julia Arnez– guitars, vocals
- Gareth Champion - drums
- Stephen Gilchrist - drums, bass guitar
