= Worthless Music =

Studio album by the Scaramanga Six
- Released: 2021
- Genre: Alternative rock; art rock; psychobilly
- Length: 55:45
- Label: Wrath

The Scaramanga Six chronology
Chronica (2017)	Worthless Music (2021)	A New Orifice (2023)

Worthless Music is the tenth album by English rock group the Scaramanga Six.

== Background ==
In a news post on the Scaramanga Six homepage on 3 December 2021, the band described the upcoming Worthless Music as being different to their last two more conceptual albums. "This time, we lack a central theme – instead a myriad of subjects: wrestles with conscience, domestic frustration, awake-dreams, drudgery and even fishing drowning dogs out of canals." Other influences on the album included "an enlightening trip to Cuba" (from which the Morricone brothers brought back a set of latin instruments including maracas, guiro and claves) and the realisation that "there’s no getting round the fact that we are a middle-aged band. We are always going to write songs from a more world-weary point of view."

On the release date for Worthless Music, Paul and Steven Morricone conducted an interview with Backstreet Media in which they provided a track-by-track breakdown of the album and commented further on the influences and factors around it. Paul Morricone noted that he had "wanted to make our sound big and deliberate on this record, so we’ve dispensed with some of the subtleties and doubled-up beats on tracks..." Regarding the album's name, he stated "the album title has its own meaning. We figured that no-one really values the craft of music-makers anymore and like most things, expect your body of work to be free to access for nothing. Convenience is killing music and we are constantly surprised at how worthless it actually is to some people, even though they want all of it all the time. If you value it, buy it."

The brothers revealed that some album tracks had been recorded on "a shit iPhone on GarageBand", with Steven Morricone confessing "I’m a complete Luddite when it comes to technology mainly because I have zero patience for any recording software/process. I want to be able to capture things as quick as humanly possible – sometimes the result of that rapid capture, no matter how crude, is where the real magic lies. We’ve done a lot of leaving large elements of demos in on this album." Adding to this, Paul remarked "due to the restrictions of lockdown, we just couldn’t get together. So we had to do a lot of working by proxy... Throughout this album, many of the poorly-recorded and weird scratchy bits are directly from the bad demos we were playing to and decided to keep in."

Paul admitted that they "still feel compelled to create noisy cinematic punk the older we get. Even though we are old dogs, I still think we have plenty of new tricks. I think this album shows that – we will willingly go off in an unexpected direction and find a fresh approach." Steven added "I’m so pleased with the way this one has turned out. Sequencing an album is a really tricky task – getting the flow just right. We struggled to find a place for this one initially, but it seems to work perfectly as melodic and frank tonic after the dramatic epic before. It’s got the steady pace of someone attempting to trek across a wintery wilderness in snow shoes, scaling a few lofty musical mountains en route."

In a separate interview with Joyzine, Paul commented "I’d written and recorded my solo album Cruel Designs at the same time as we did this bunch of songs. To me it’s all the same, but in the two records there’s a marked difference in sound from a more orchestral croonfest of the solo record to the more abrasive punk sound of Worthless Music."

== Reception ==
In Classic Rock, Julian Marszalek observed "thanks to a hermetically sealed approach that's seen The Scaramanga Six release their own albums, handle their own PR, shoot their own videos and book their own tours for well over two decades, the Huddersfield art-rockers are a band that’s easy. But are they one to fall in love with? With Worthless Music - their tenth album, no less – The Scaramanga Six (all four of ’em) make a convincing case for your affections. Their template of twisted punk rock remains in place, but here the results are harder and firmer. The skew-whiff madness of "Horse with No Face" hits hard, "Death Mask of the Unknown Lady of the Seine" rocks and rollicks while pausing to take a detour into '60s spy-theme-music territory. The squelchy "Ipso Facto" overstays its welcome, the glam balladry of "Boy" tempers the pace. Music to quite fancy, then."

In RPM Online, Martin Chamarette noted that "after the loosely conceptual albums The Terrifying Dream and Chronica, the lead tracks "Horse with No Face" and "An Error Occurred" suggested a more feral, focussed sound this time round. And it is a righteous racket, indeed." He noted the diversity of the tracks, observing that "..."Big Ideas" lurches from the speakers, lop-sided and menacing. If a song can drag one leg behind it, this one does... "An Error Occurred" is like a slap to the face, in the nicest way. It’s pared back, lean, like The Fall on steroids, with the signature punchy bass of Steven Morricone... They have a way with their backing vocals which is unlike anyone else, it often draws me in... Paul (Morricone)’s voice (is) the secret weapon. Lush, he veers here between sinister and loving... "Dog Form", with military drums and a bridge that surprises, is suitably odd and addictive. "Cults" even throws in a bit of Showaddywaddy. Expect the unexpected... Once again, only the Scaramanga Six could have created this album... I hope you get addicted to their unique musical world."

Having commented on the band's cinematic qualities, Stuart McHugh of Is This Music? went on to add "loud and shouty music may be in vogue in the shape of Idles et al and the Scaramangas have never been shy to turn up the volume; but so are complex, shifting rhythms (Black Midi etc), and the band have been covering all areas of the musical spectrum across their ten-album career. Here their sound is more direct than previously – opener "Big Ideas" driven along by chugging bass and Gareth Champion’s pounding beats before careering into one of their trademark soaring choruses. Other highlights in the bumper fourteen tracks include "An Error Occurred", its full-on in-yer-face punk rock breaking down into what may well be a harpsichord solo, while "Kate and Cindy" is similarly urgent with its stabs of organ and Julia Arnez’s meandering guitar lines built for the alternative radio airwaves. However, there’s no-one else currently making music quite like the epic mutant prog rock of "It is the Face Wish How" – but it’s surely just a matter of time before everyone else catches up."

In Ringmaster Review, Pete RingMaster stated that "quite simply Worthless Music pretty much blows most contenders out of those Album of The Year waters... imagine a mutant derived from the inimitable juices of The Cardiacs, 12 Stone Toddler, XTC, The Three Johns and Wolver and you get a hint of The Scaramanga Six imagination and sound, though we would suggest some of that list has more than been inspired by the Huddersfield quartet itself. Theirs is a sound though which is unique in all aspects and has always been so since their emergence... It is easy to tag it as art rock but really it is a web and insanity of flavours spun with mischief and irreverence and embracing everything from punk and post punk to alternative/art pop. Worthless Music swiftly proves it is anything but what its title claims... The Scaramanga Six proving that they are gloriously like no other and a richer incitement than ever before."

RingMaster went on to praise many of the album tracks including "It is the Face Wish How" ("(an) absurd wonder (with) haunting majesty and shadows"), "Dog Form" ("a beast of design and temptation... a post punk dissonance accompanying its bestial moves and insatiable creative desire and in every aspect, trait and inclination (proving) superbly addictive soon exposing our instinctive subservience to such devilry") and "Ipso Facto" ("simply glorious, a slice of the bizarre amid condemnation which creatively and emotionally becomes more bent out of shape... an electronic bossa nova hooked to alternative rock peculiarities, the track suggests the possibilities if Sparks thought they were Faith No More."

In The Ginger Quiff, Neilho27 called the album a "belter", adding "this is a thunderously good collection of powerfully strident hard-edged, while sophistically artfully concocted, post punk anthems. Certainly nothing worthless here, no weak links and plenty of compelling melodies... There is a certain affinity with other stalwarts of the punk/post punk scene such as bands like The Cravats, not purely in the sound, but in the enigmatic nature of many of the song lyrics. Undoubtedly there is also something in the surname Morricone too, with a sweeping cinematic architecture to many of the songs here, none more so on the highly effective (and affecting) "Boy", a film soundtrack if ever I heard one, with such heartfelt lyrics. Certainly one of the album highlights for me. If I started to list the highlights of the album, I’d end up just starting to list all fourteen songs on the album. Every song has its own USPs, while as a whole the album comes together as a fully cohesive piece... All these songs unique in their own way, all stamping their own personality on the album but, as a whole gelling seamlessly, demonstrating the indisputable sound of The Scaramanga Six and in doing so creating one of those all killer no filler” albums."

Ed Jupp of God is in the TV was similarly enthusiastic, stating "so often there are those press releases that either state that the band’s influences are really hard to put down, and once in a blue moon that is actually true. This is one of those cases. So many bits and pieces fly past you at a furious rate that you find yourself thinking of The Fall and Faith No More in fairly short succession. Then you stop trying to clutch so much at influences and realise that rock music, for all its repeated cliches can offer something fresh and daring without being pretentious, nor succumbing to novelty. Plenty of other acts should be taking note that this is how to do it. "I’m not beholden to anyone!" they sing on fantastic opener ‘Big Ideas.’ They really aren’t... The band are not trying to be clever, but just doing what comes naturally... Sometimes records which pull this off will still get dubbed record collection rock, on the grounds that you can hear what their influences are. Here the difference is that the band are truly independent, ploughing their own furrow and not caring two hoots for a nervous A&R person whining that they ‘don’t hear a single.’ If perhaps one or two tracks being left off might have made the album feel even tighter, it’s not to take back what I have said."

Nite Songs gave the album an eight-out-of-ten rating, commenting "they're a group who are sometimes brilliant, sometimes bewildering but never anything less than a fascinating listen. And in Worthless Music they may just have served up one of their strongest offerings for some time... (It) finds the Scaramangas as difficult to pigeonhole than ever and in great form. One of those albums you can happily lose yourself in for days, it may not be the easiest beast to get into but persevere with it and it'll quickly worm its way into your listening affections and happily stay there for months. Great stuff."

Joyzine was particularly inspired by the album. In an initial review, Andrew Wood hailed The Scaramanga Six as "the greatest band in the world" and declared that Worthless Music "sees the band gleefully upping the immediacy and going for a British bulldog-style charge of the light brigade, all guns blazing in a race for god-knows-where, on a horse with no face no doubt. Previous incarnations of the Scaramanga Six have seen them flirting with prog, alternative metal, weird Victorian music hall... I mean, you name it, the Scara’s have probably done it. Along the way they’ve worked with legends like Tim Smith and Steve Albini and produced a body of work that is truly mind-numbing in scope and density... The band have always had a penchant for The Fall. Even at their most pompous they are never far away from their post punk roots, and it seems the recent re-issue of the classic Hex Enduction Hour may have reawakened their love, as riffs are lifted respectfully and layered into the mix. The band have always shown a passion and respect for the music that moulded them, from Scott 4 to Magazine’s theatricality to Cardiacs intensity, and have often thrown these influences into the heady mix... There is no-one quite like them. They take an idea and clothe it in so many other ideas that it almost topples under the weight, tottering and stumbling but always kept upright by the confidence of the drummer Gareth Champion, and the sheer brilliance of their playing."

Comparing opening track "Big Ideas" to "Björk's "Army of Me" played by Black Sabbath" Wood goes on to add "there’s an intentional atonality about Paul’s vocals as he spits and snarls his way through "An Error Occurred" like a really pissed-off Hugh Cornwell. It’s almost as if he got all his usual Scott Walker style crooning out of his system on his recent solo albums and he’s really going for it on this one... When people say ‘they don’t write songs like they used to these days’ just take a listen to ("Former Selves"). With one lift after another, this is classic songwriting of the highest order. It is presented, and unfolds like a three-course meal at an exclusive restaurant, building from an entrée into a taste sensation of sax solos and beautiful tunes merging and popping on the taste-buds like space dust, before leaving you sated with the wafer thin mint of Paul’s dulcet tones. It doesn’t get better than this... It’s all quite breathtaking."

Wood also picked the "brilliant" Worthless Music as one of his albums of the year for 2021 (with its track "It is the Face With How" as his song of the year); with Joyzone editor Paul Maps following suit and describing the album as "a dramatic, maximalist labyrinth of an LP full of unexpected twists and turns."

== Track listing ==
All tracks are written by Paul Morricone/Steven Morricone.

No.	Title	Length
1.	"Big Ideas"	4:26
2.	"An Error Occurred"	3:46
3.	"Decade with No Name"	3:28
4.	"Boy"	4:47
5.	"Horse with No Face"	2:20
6.	"Dog Form"	5:11
7.	"Cults"	3:04
8.	"Death Mask of the Unknown Lady of the Seine"	6:41
9.	"Former Selves"	3:44
10.	"Stranger in Your Own Mind"	3:49
11.	"Ipso Facto"	3:44
12.	"Kate & Cindy"	4:02
13.	"It is The Face Wish How"	3.16
14.	"Then I Met Joanna"	3:27

== Personnel ==
- Paul Morricone – vocals, guitars, keyboards, baritone saxophone, etc.
- Steven Morricone – vocals, bass guitar, keyboards, tenor saxophone, etc.
- Julia Arnez– guitars, vocals
- Gareth Champion - drums
