= The Terrifying Dream =

Studio album by the Scaramanga Six
- Released: 2015
- Genre: Alternative rock; art rock; psychobilly
- Length: 50:30
- Label: Wrath
- Producer: Alan Smyth

The Scaramanga Six chronology
Scenes of Mild Peril – The Scaramanga Six Live in Session 2013–2014 (2014)	The Terrifying Dream (2015)	Chronica (2017)

The Terrifying Dream is the eighth album by English rock group the Scaramanga Six.

== Background ==
The Terrifying Dream is the first in a couple of more thematically conceived Scaramanga Six albums (the second of which is the band's 2017 album Chronica). All of the songs are centred on the idea of nightmares. The band have described it as "a musical journey into the unconscious where your thoughts and fears seem to multiply and mutate into a hideous beast intent on waking you with a start. Every song is loosely based around a dream or nightmare endured by the band. Songs about the distortion of reality that are dreams and things that go bump in the night. Ever woken to find yourself transformed into a gigantic beetle? Or a coconut crab?"

The album stems from a particularly productive period for the band. Speaking to Sea of Tranquillity in September 2015, Steven Morricone recounted "in spite of all the self-imposed difficulties, we seemed to come up with the most coherent and vast array of songs yet. We had 20 or so songs selected for recording, so when complete there was a delicious dilemma in which to pick for the album - something we've not had before as we usually just bung the lot on. The end result just seemed to flow perfectly - we really do think this is our best yet, no word of a lie. It's taken us in some very tantalising new directions with a new level of darkness, yet seems also to be one of our most "poppy". How the frig did we manage that? Just couldn't wait for people to wrap their ears around it."

In the same interview, Steven expounded on the album's thematic qualities. "Most of our albums have a vaguely concept-y feel to them, but this one seems to have been stitched together tighter than others. The first few songs to emerge seemed to sum up waking with a cold sweat and a pounding heart after some unfathomable jumble of feelings, situations and people from your subconscious touches a genuine nerve in your sleep. It stemmed from there really: a collection of songs inspired by the strange and uncontrollable truths of your dreams. Horrendous and stifling environments and grim caricatures of familiar people mix with real home life ("Citadel"), deep longing and heart-stabbing guilt ("Arabella"), strange third-person detachment and morbid fascination ("The Outsider" and "Staring at the Accident"). The album has a strangely calming epilogue in "Be Nothing" in the realization that none of these human concerns actually matter... It would be trite to say that the idea came to us in a dream, and also complete bollocks. How the hell can we all be dreaming the same thing at the same time unless our brains were locked in uni-thought by some strange force? That normally only happens during live performances. Seriously, it happened organically from a few fronds of commonality that seemed to get thicker and more pervasive - like a bramble through a shrubbery. We merely harvested the berries and made one hell of a crumble."

""The Man Who Couldn't Sing" is about one such nightmare situation whereby the subject of the dream is onstage for the most important public appearance of his career only to be choked to croaky silence by an imaginary hand of terror. Our Paul dreamt this one up, but in reality it never happens of course - none of can seem to stop him singing, no matter how hard we strangle. I think pretty much every musician has this same sort of dream - you are playing in your favourite band and suddenly you don't know any of the material, your equipment is buggered or you just can't seem to physically get on the stage. Your ambitions are realized only to be scuppered. Mine seem to feature a lot of logistical problems and general untidiness onstage - perhaps that says something autobiographical?"

Referring to the album's musical influences, Steven commented "you can probably hear elements of Stranglers, Magazine, Cardiacs, The Four Tops, Burt Bacharach, Black Sabbath, Talking Heads, Julian Cope, John Barry and the like all mushed up into a paste that ultimately still sounds like us. We like the dramatizations and distortions of the human condition that the likes of Scott Walker, Andy Partridge or Sparks bring into song. Writing styles and approaches vary wildly - sometimes it comes easy, other times an idea can be gestating for months or even years."

Released on 8 June 2015, the album was preceded by "The Batface Trilogy" - a set of three related EPs. Each featured one song from the album plus three additional songs further exploring the "nightmare" theme. The three EPs were released at monthly intervals preceding the album release. The Eye and Skin Machine was released in March 2015, Worm Necklace in April 2015 and The Sleeper Must Awake in May 2015.

== Reception ==
Writing in The Haverhill Echo, Stuart McHugh opined "..."A musical journey into the unconscious" might sound like PR blurb, but enter the world of this Sheffield quartet, and their explorations of personally endured dreams – and nightmares – and it all comes true. Their eighth album takes their regular blueprint – impassioned vocal harmonies, big choruses and massive swells of sound – and multiplies them tenfold. Opener "Rules" gets the eleven-tracker off to a furious start, all acidic guitar with keyboard flounces while "Citadel" is pretty much a mini rock opera. Elaborate production sees prog rock tendencies married with a very punk rock aesthetic – think the Sex Pistols crossed with Queen. A mighty release." Martin Haslam of Louder Than War called The Terrifying Dream "a benchmark album from a band with quite a few of those under their belt... They are a singular band; greater than the sum of their influences."

In a highly positive review in Echoes and Dust, Stuart Benjamin enthused "it’s just great from the first to the last note. Whatever you may think about the band, you can’t deny that they can write and arrange great songs. They’re clearly influenced by the classic songwriters/arrangers – the influence of Burt Bacharach, Hal David, Richard and Karen Carpenter, even Todd Rundgren at times. The playing is, as you would expect with such a time served band, exemplary. They leap from Sonic Youth-style surf guitar music to soaring classical rock in very easy bounds."

Continuing, Benjamin adds ‘"..."Out of My Mind" is another standout song, a Phil Spector-esque wall of sound that really gives a chance for the band's close vocal harmonies to shine. It's easy to forget that, amongst the swirling maelstrom of amplified instruments, The Scaramanga Six is choc-a-block full of great singers that can really harmonise together (perhaps that's where I see The Carpenters’ influence). I’ve always loved Paul Morricone's voice, his classic baritone is so well suited to The Six sound, but he's always more than generous in handing out the vocal duties. "The Outsider" allows Julia Arnez's contralto to take the lead on a beautiful mournful song full of soul and desperation. "Arabella" is typically Scaramanga Six – an epic, overblown, and utterly compelling tale of love lost. At the geographical centre of the album is "Citadel", something of a prog-rock workout that talks about the silos or prisons that we allow ourselves to get locked into. For some reason Paul Morricone's vocals come over a bit Stranded-era Bryan Ferry for the first half of the track – I'm not sure if it's intentional, but it kind of works and is brilliantly countered by a middle section that rocks hard before a bloody marvellous keyboard led final act... It's perhaps unfashionable in a post-rock, math-rock, ironic-rock world, to be a band that really play well, that really sing well, and just bang out great tunes, but the Scaramanga Six really are the whole package. If you haven't got into them what the fuck have you been doing all this time? Your record collection needs them and so do you."

Saluting the band's knack for "instantly memorable riffs with many-layered lush vocals and a lot of heart", Sean Kitching of The Quietus commented that "with the application of a little imagination, each of the eleven tracks becomes a self-contained psychodrama, the best of which are like nightmares fated to recur for at least as long as it takes to shake loose from the grip of their relentless melodies... The Scaramanga Six have always been musical magpies, playfully dropping quotes here and there, but their music is kept from becoming a cold exercise in postmodern appropriation by the level of ambition and enthusiasm they approach it with... Closing track "Be Nothing" acts as a soothing balm, a comedown lullaby with an accepting, yet nihilistic streak at its crooning heart: "We're just particles, nothing more, nothing less." The Scaramanga Six make music to make mind movies to, and long may they continue."

Reviewing the album for Sea of Tranquillity, Steven Reid suggested that "using words like power-pop, or pop-rock conjures up very specific images and bands, so let's call the Scaramanga Six something else, shall we? Pop-ant-garde anyone? Or simply quirky rock with hooks, progressive passages and off-the-wall tangents? Hmmm... maybe not quite as catchy. Whatever we call them (actually, bloody good will suffice), The Terrifying Dream is a mighty statement and one which is as multifaceted as it is seductive and as unsettling as it is pointedly crackers!... I can think of few outfits this capable of being as "out of the box" as TheScarSix, yet as simple and straightforward in their approach."

Commenting further, Reid said that "..."Staring At The Accident" perfectly illustrates the observational commentary behind TSS's lyrics and yet never does the album feel like a finger-wagging, this-is-how-the-world-should-be lecture, or indeed an English lesson. That it starts with a casual whistle and lackadaisical pace also goes to show how comfortable the Scaramangas are simply letting their ideas play out at their natural, unforced pace. If, however, the mood takes them - and it does - don't be fooled into thinking that this lot can't be forceful agitators; boy can they! Sample the considered build of "Tempest", tumultuously melodic "Blood on My Hands" and the unavoidably memorable "The Man Who Couldn't Sing" (which, ironically you'll be singing for days after) for proof. In fact the latter of those three isn't just the Scaramanga Six near their imperious best, it's simply a cracking corker of chorus-led capers that you'll want to coax from this album again and again. What the Scaramanga Six have conjured here may well be "The Terrifying Dream", but it sure makes for a wonderful reality!"

== Track listing ==
All tracks are written by Paul Morricone/Steven Morricone.

No.	Title	Length
1.	"Rules"	2:51
2.	"The Man Who Couldn't Sing"	5:02
3.	"Out of My Tiny Mind"	3:33
4.	"The Outsider"	2:59
5.	"Arabella"	5:44
6.	"Citadel"	8:30
7.	"Seven Chances"	4:03
8.	"Staring at the Accident"	4:09
9.	"Tempest"	5:09
10.	"Blood on My Hands"	4:38
11.	"Be Nothing"	3:52

== Personnel ==
- Paul Morricone – vocals, guitars, keyboards, baritone saxophone, etc.
- Steven Morricone – vocals, bass guitar, keyboards, tenor saxophone, etc.
- Julia Arnez– guitars, vocals
- Gareth Champion - drums
