= The Scaramanga Six =

English rock band

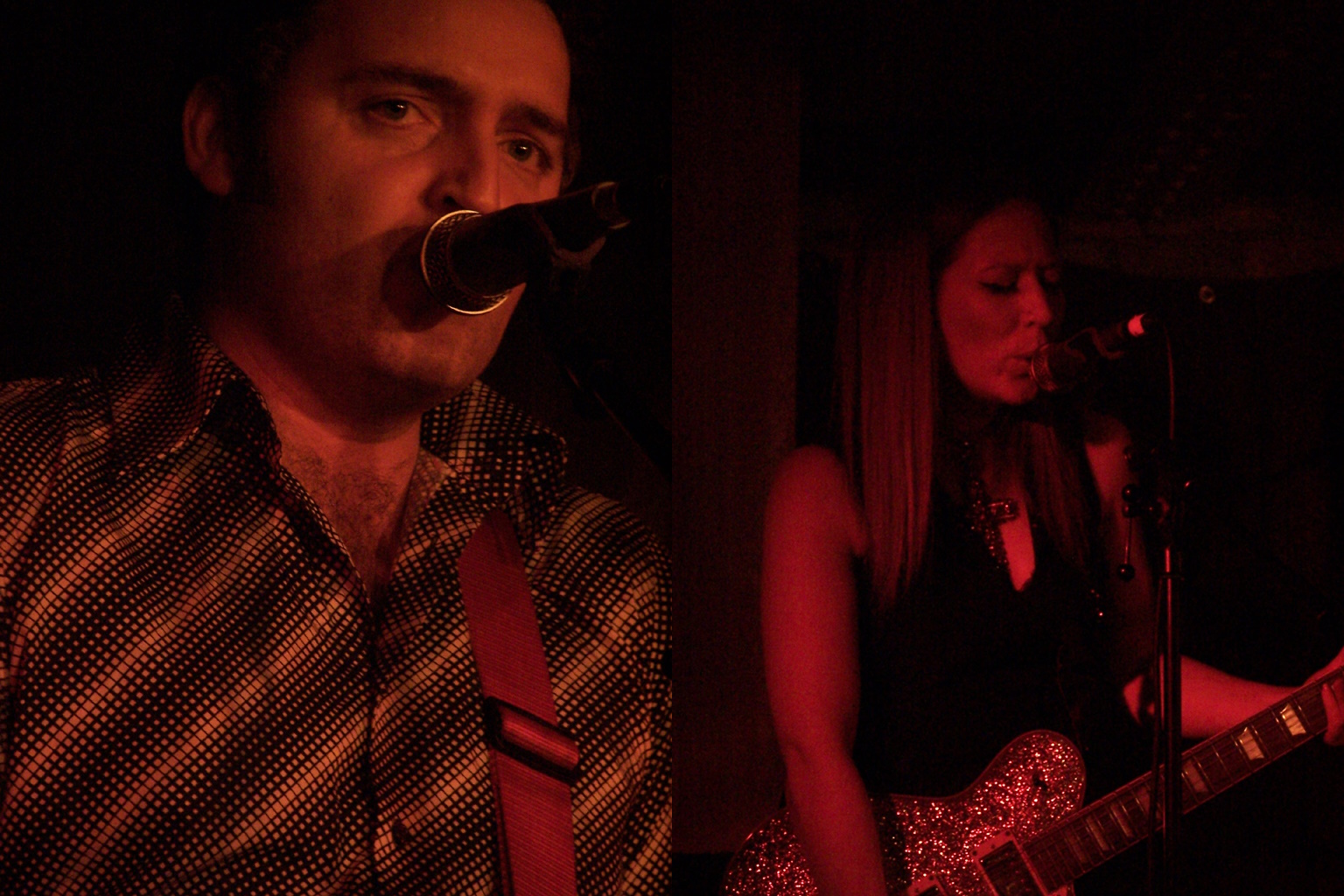
- Paul Morricone (left) and Julia Arnez (right) performing with the Scaramanga Six in 2008

Background information
- Origin: Huddersfield, England
- Genres: Alternative rock; art rock; rockabilly
- Years active: 1995–present
- Labels: Trinity; Wrath
- Members: Paul Morricone; Steven Morricone; Julia Arnez; Gareth Champion
- Past members: Bill Bailey; John Gulliver; Emma Calvert; Jem Bowden; James Agnew; Jenny Harris; Stephen Gilchrist; Anthony Sargeant; Chris Catalyst; James Kenosha
- Website: thescaramangasix.co.uk

The Scaramanga Six are an English rock band. Originally formed in 1995 and based in Huddersfield, the band currently consists of multi-instrumentalist founder members Paul Morricone (vocals, guitar, etc.) and Steven Morricone (vocals, bass guitar, keyboards etc.), plus Julia Arnez (guitar, vocals) and Gareth Champion (drums).

The Scaramanga Six are noted for their aggressive live act and their flamboyant and theatrical songs, which have made them a significant band on the Leeds rock scene. Entirely self-managed and self-releasing (via their own Wrath Records label), their independent business practices and active promotion of other artists has seen them hailed as "the closest we'll see to a British answer to Fugazi" and described as "working entirely outside the indie scene, let alone the actual industry." The band also have a distinctive visual identity and style thanks to Paul Morricone's self-directed promotional films for the band, via his own Poison Pen Films and Thunder & Lighting companies.

Nominally and originally a sextet, the actual band lineup over the years has varied between four and six members. The ten former Scaramanga Six members include Stephen Gilchrist, multi-instrumentalist Chris Catalyst and James Kenosha.

== Sound, influences, themes and visuals ==
The Scaramanga Six play a tuneful and carefully arranged mixture of heavy rock, vocal pop, rockabilly, garage and crooner songs described as "intense-yet-aloof rock operas" (Drowned In Sound) and "B-movie chic combined with real musical muscle" (Kerrang). They have also been described as "a British Queens Of The Stone Age." Influences cited by the band themselves include The Stranglers, Cardiacs, The Cramps and Tony Bennett. Their song lyrics are characterised by themes of dark humour, desperation, tongue-in-cheek self-aggrandisement, criminality, "the drudgery of everyday life, work and office politics", and human/animal behaviourism.

The band has a strong visual sense reflected in their use of video and release artwork, which is all handled in-house by Paul Morricone. Paul cites this aspect of the band's work as being partly down to his own "day time job – working in television as a director/editor. So naturally I am interested in the visual aspect of things. It's not just about creating an image to sell the band though. Our video to "The Poison Pen" doesn't even have us in it – just an insane psycho rabbit man. I've always enjoyed the total package that is an album. I like looking at sleeve notes and photos and design and imagining what the band were doing at the time. It's all part of the mystique and fascination, don't you think? It's why people will always buy records rather than download them." The band's visual stylings extend to their onstage presentation. They perform in a Mafia-style "confrontational family" manner wearing suits and ties and staring out their audiences.

== History ==
=== Prehistory ===
Fraternal twin brothers Paul and Steven Morricone were born in Weston-super-Mare, UK in 1973. They spent their formative years absorbing a mixture of The Stranglers and Tony Bennett, resulting in the discovery that "there was much fun to be had in crooning and shouting in equal measures." The Morricones have been a creative hub since childhood, with Paul Morricone commenting "Steve is my brother and therefore we stick together. If there are any decisions to be made, we thrash it out between us. It was like that at school – if you've got a problem with him, you'll have me to deal with too."

Circa 1988, while still teenagers, Paul and Steven (both singing and playing saxophones) joined a band called The Silent Zones which included their drummer cousin James Agnew and guitarist James Parsons. Following lineup changes (and a spell as Phobia) Paul, Steven and the two Jameses recruited bass guitarist Fraser McAlpine to form Roger's Trout Farm, a band with a strong Cardiacs/Bonzo Dog Band influence. McAlpine would later admit "listening now, it seems that none of us could play anything without making it fiddly, and a smidge too fast. I love that about us."

During this period Paul began to learn how to play guitar, insisting that the songs he wanted to write couldn't be written on the saxophone. Not to be outdone, Steven learned bass guitar and began to develop his own abilities as songwriter and organizer (as well as his talents as "a born entertainer.") In 2011, James Parsons would recall that "in what seemed like no time at all, (Paul) totally eclipsed our song writing abilities, both him and Steve churning out great song after song... Paul has developed the envious skill of being able to place the listener in the song, making them feel connected, like they are being sung to."

Roger's Trout Farm played for a number of years around Somerset and recorded several demo tapes including SpitTreeDogLove. Following the departure of McAlpine in 1991, Agnew and the Morricones briefly backed a local songwriter friend (singing guitarist Julia Arnez) in another band, Spawnmate, which recorded a demo tape but never played live. Agnew and the Morricones then reunited with Parsons under the name of Supersaurus (with Steven on bass) until various members headed off to university. Nominally, Supersaurus continued to exist during the first half of the 1990s, but with Agnew and Parsons now studying in London (and Paul and Steven Morricone studying in Yorkshire and Leicester respectively), opportunities to work together became rare and the band gradually and amicably dissolved.

Many years later, in May 2011, Roger's Trout Farm would reunite for three commemorative gigs. All of the band's members had continued to work in music - besides the Morricone's work with the Scaramanga Six and others, Fraser McAlpine had become a web content editor working on the Top of the Pops website and BBC Radio 1's ChartBlog while James Parsons had become guitarist for Spearmint, and reunited with James Agnew in tELLEy.

=== Scaramanga (1995–1999) ===
The Morricones reunited in Huddersfield after graduation and in 1995 formed Scaramanga with Paul on vocals and guitar and Steven on vocals and bass, completing the lineup with guitarist Bill Bailey, keyboard player John Gulliver (alias "Chester Valentino") and Emma Calvert on vocals, percussion and drums. The band played a debut gig at Dr Browns in Huddersfield in June 1995, in a double bill with a short-lived jazz-fusion project called The XJ6 (in which the Morricones played saxophones alongside drummer Pat Fulgoni and bass player Rob Watson). With the addition of drummer Jem Bowden, Scaramanga went on to record the demo cassette Tetsura (two of the songs on the tape, "Choking" and "Ladies And Gentlemen" would later appear on subsequent recordings). Both of the Morricone brothers also played saxophones for the band, providing the opportunity for overdubbed brass sections.

When Emma Calvert left the band in late spring 1996, she was replaced on vocals and drums by the Morricone's former Spawnmate colleague Julia Arnez, with whom the band recorded another demo tape called Big Themes And Incidental Music and another recording called Stereo Car Chase.

In late 1997, the band recorded a split single for Double Plus records with Slot Jockey (the Scaramanga contribution being "Vamp", co-sung/screamed by Arnez and Steven Morricone). Scaramanga gigged in Northern England for another year and a half before renaming themselves the Scaramanga Six.

=== Early Scaramanga Six – The Liar the Bitch and Her Wardrobe & Strike! Up the Band (1999–2002) ===
At this time, the Scaramanga Six formed a partnership of mutual respect with two other bands from the Leeds area, Landspeed Loungers and Chest. Several triple-header gigs in Leeds and London were played, one of which was commemorated with a rare sold-on-the-door cassette release featuring the three bands covering each other's songs. This alliance would eventually lead to the foundation of the Scaramanga Six's record label, Wrath Records.

The debut Scaramanga Six album—The Liar the Bitch and Her Wardrobe—was released in spring 1999 on Trinity Records (the band's quickly-assembled precursor to Wrath Records). Mostly recorded as a live-in-the-studio session, the album also included "Vamp" and several songs which would later be improved and re-recorded for later releases ("Poison Fang", "The Coward" and "Horrible Face" on the Cabin Fever album and "Singer Of Songs" for the …Continuing Saga EP). At this point, Julia Arnez wrote songs and sang almost as many lead vocals as the Morricone brothers. On subsequent records, by her own choice, she would switch from drums to guitar and concentrate on harmony vocals, and would not participate in the writing.

By summer 1999 the Morricones' old Roger's Trout Farm/Supersaurus bandmate James Agnew had replaced Bowden on drums. Former Chest member Jenny "Jet" Harris joined on guitar and keyboards a year later in summer 2000. In April 2001 the band released the Are You One Of The Family? EP (the debut release by the newly launched Wrath Records). This began to gain the band attention in underground publications across Britain, and featured a re-recording of "Ladies And Gentlemen" from the band's first demo tape. However, by this point the band had parted company with Bill Bailey, who left during the EP sessions. John Gulliver would also leave and rejoin the band several times between 2000 and 2002, becoming something of a "floating member" (although he would play on all of the recordings during this period).

In January 2002, the band released another EP, The Continuing Saga of the Scaramanga Six with the driving "Pressure Cage" as the lead song. The EP featured several inventive video clips directed by Paul Morricone, whose day job was as a film and television director/editor. (He had helped to establish Poison Pen Films—affiliated to Metro Films in Leeds—which would handle all future Scaramanga Six video work). In September 2002, the band released a split single with Les Flames, contributing the song "You Do, You Die".

The second Scaramanga Six album—Strike! Up the Band—was released in November 2002 and compiled various tracks from the last few EPs and singles as well as new tracks. It was described by Rock Sound as "retro-rock with panache… as raw as scraping your knuckles on a cheese-grater." It would also be the last time (to date) when the Scaramanga Six would match their name and appear as a sextet.

Problems with lineups continued to dog the band, partly due to their stubborn determination to remain independent. Self-financing the band via their day jobs proved costly in money and time. Jenny Harris left the band in order to take up a career in arts administration and James Agnew left in order to move to Australia (though he would return to Britain in late 2006 and join another band, The Gresham Flyers). Regarding the band's regular line-up changes, Paul Morricone has commented "everyone who has been in the Scaramanga Six has put in one hundred per cent. When they leave, it's usually due to personal reasons – careers, babies etc. There has never been anything acrimonious and we're still in touch with all of our former colleagues. If I had my way, I'd pay them all to stay and we'd be a twelve-piece."

=== Cabin Fever and The Dance of Death (2003–2007) ===
Recruiting Stephen Gilchrist as the new drummer, the Scaramanga Six continued as a quintet. With Jenny Harris helping out on keyboards at a couple of dates, the band toured in February 2003 to promote Strike! Up The Band: Steven Morricone doubled on bass guitar and keyboard on the remaining dates.

“We really found a real kindred spirit with Tim – he really seemed to instinctively know what we were after. No idea was too ridiculous or too elaborate – he was up for all sorts of bold production ideas."

— Steven Morricone on working with Tim Smith

At this point, the Scaramanga Six also began a fruitful collaboration with producer Tim Smith (leader of Cardiacs), beginning regular recording sessions at Smith's Wiltshire studios. By the end of 2003, the band had recorded most of their next album, but had finally parted company with John Gulliver, although the latter contributed to the album sessions. They had also parted company with Stephen Gilchrist, who left to work with Graham Coxon and to concentrate on his own band stuffy/the fuses (although he would remain a close friend of the band and return on several occasions). Gilchrist was replaced as drummer by Anthony Sargeant (and who could add falsetto backing vocals to the band's live set).

In December 2003, the band released "The Poison Pen" as their half of a split single (with Beachbuggy). The third Scaramanga Six album, Cabin Fever, was released in April 2004, receiving rave reviews in the underground press. Trakmarx stated "The Scaramanga Six have talent, taste & humour in spades - all they need now is your patronage" while Gigwise commented that "Cabin Fever makes you laugh, stroke your imaginary goatee, dance like a frog on E and shit your pants in one hearing." The band toured around the UK and released two singles from the album—"We Rode The Storm" (November 2004) and "Horrible Face" (May 2005 - the latter another re-recording of a …Liar… song).

At around this time, the Scaramanga Six became a quintet when multi-instrumentalist Chris Catalyst was brought into the band. Playing keyboards and trombone and singing backing vocals, he could also double on bass guitar and second drum kit, greatly expanding the band's live potential. In November 2005, the Scaramanga Six revealed new material via a split single (with Me Against Them), contributing "I Wear My Heart On My Sleeve".

In 2006, following Anthony Sargeant's departure (and temporary fill-ins by Steve Gilchrist and James Kenosha), "Maraca" Gareth Champion joined the Scaramanga Six as the band's new drummer. Along with the Morricones and Arnez, he would form a core quartet for the band which has continued to the present day.

"A lot of the lyrical content is designed to draw the listener in and empathise with the characters mentioned, or sung from the point of view of – whether they be real, exaggerated or fictional (sometimes it's hard to distinguish). For that reason we might come across (as) misogynistic, cruel or self-obsessed, which of course is all rubbish. Inspiration for lyrics can often come from people we see milling about trying to live their lives amongst severe futility and obstacles (usually self-made). There's a lot of our frustrations in there too. People like Scott Walker, Elvis Costello, Andy Partridge etc were all good at this approach – and also managed to get enough pop hooks in too."

— Steven Morricone on the Scaramanga Six lyrical approach

In August 2006, the Scaramanga Six released another single, "Baggage". Both this and "I Wear My Heart on My Sleeve" featured on their fourth album, The Dance Of Death, which was released in January 2007 and hailed as their most accomplished and coherent release to date. A re-released "I Wear My Heart On My Sleeve" was released as a stand-alone single in November 2007.

=== Hot Flesh Rumble and Songs Of Prey (2008–2010) ===
In May 2008, the Scaramanga Six released a brand new single—"Walking Through Houses"—and announced the title of an upcoming fifth album—A Pound Of Flesh. However, in an e-mail newsletter to the band's mailing list on 17 October 2008, Steven Morricone announced that A Pound Of Flesh would be shelved indefinitely following the cardiac arrest and subsequent hospitalisation of producer Tim Smith. Steven explained "The news was a dreadful shock to people, especially to his many close friends. Tim is now starting out on a long road to recovery and we can only wish him and everyone close to him the greatest of strength and resolve in this very difficult time. If love alone is all that is needed for recovery there is certainly no shortage for Tim. With this in mind, we decided to postpone work on A Pound Of Flesh for the near future. We will return to it one day when Tim is better."

In the same e-mail newsletter, Steven announced that the Scaramanga Six had returned to being a quartet (Chris Catalyst having left to concentrate on his band Eureka Machines) and that the band had written a brand new sixth studio album to replace A Pound Of Flesh. The band would begin recording this new album at the end of October and would also be scheduling a tour for the same time.

On 17 December 2008, the band released a live radio sessions album called Hot Flesh Rumble. This contained their radio session recordings from the previous few years, featuring "gritty versions of songs from all the previous albums as well as the first recorded release of many of the songs from the postponed A Pound Of Flesh." On the same day, the band announced that their new album would be called Songs Of Prey and was being produced by James Kenosha (one of the band's previous drummers, and also a producer who'd previously worked with Duels, Grammatics and This et al.).

Songs Of Prey was released on 20 April 2009, with the band playing a short British tour (plus an appearance in Denmark) to promote it. The album was once again well received by the alternative press, with This Is Fake DIY describing it as "cinematic art-rock that combines thrashing guitars with orchestral and distinctly non-rock instruments to create something individual and that has instant replay value... This is pop music that's not only absurd but pop music that's aware of the inherent absurdities of creating pop music. Yes, there's moments where you feel that the most appropriate action to take whilst listening to the record is to thrust your fist in the air in a stadium rock fashion, but somehow this bombast is endearing, where we would expect it to be off-putting." The Yorkshire Evening Post also hailed it as "a riff-heavy, ballsy heavy rock album that mixes up the stirring bombast of Rainbow and the compelling muscularity of Queens Of The Stone Age, yet still throws in enough musical and lyrical curveballs to lift it out of the ordinary. With vocals that are part dive-bar crooner and part righteous rocker, theatrical overtones and gothic undercurrents, the album is overblown, intense and great fun." On 13 June, the band announced the release of promotional video clips for two of the songs from the album, "Misadventure" and "Back To School".

In May 2010, the band began recording new sessions at 2Fly Studios in Sheffield with producer Alan Smythe. The band went on to play more concerts in England and Scandinavia, with Steve Gilchrist temporarily filling in for an absent Gareth Champion. In a blog posting on 22 November 2010, Paul Morricone revealed that the band had completely reworked and re-recorded the material originally written for the shelved album A Pound of Flesh and would release it as a brand new album, Cursed (featuring a guest appearance from Thomas Truax).

In October 2010, the Scaramanga Six released their first compilation album, An Introduction to the Scaramanga Six. Sold via Bandcamp as a download-only release, the album was designed to be updateable as the band's catalogue expanded (The first updated version was released in March 2014). In December 2010, the Scaramanga Six contributed two Cardiacs cover versions to the Leader of the Starry Skies project (a fundraising compilation album initiative to benefit the hospitalised Tim Smith).

=== Cursed and Phantom Head (2011–2013) ===
The Scaramanga Six's sixth album, Cursed (described by the band as "our magnum hopeless" and featuring the reworked material from A Pound of Flesh), was released in 2011. Produced by Alan Smyth, it featured guest appearances from Thomas Truax, playing (amongst other things) his Hornicator and Dracula's Eyeball instruments. The album generated two further singles—"Autopsy of the Mind" (which "dissect(ed) a failed relationship in CSI: Huddersfield style") and "Trouble" (a further fundraising release for Tim Smith's medical funds which was backed with the band's cover of Cardiacs' "Everything is Easy"). It also included "Walking Through Houses", the 2008 single from the previous Tim Smith sessions.

In 2012, the band used a crowd-sourcing initiative to raise funds to travel to Chicago and record with Steve Albini. For these sessions, the band expanded to a sextet for the first time since 2002, with the Morricone brothers, Arnez and Champion augmented by Steve Gilchrist (returning as a second drummer) and James Kenosha (this time on piano). The band recorded live onto two-track tape, with the Morricone brothers returning to Chicago for a second session later in the year. The results were released as the band's seventh album, Phantom Head, in April 2013 (preceded by another single, "I Will Crush Your Heart", in November 2012).

=== Scenes of Mild Peril and The Terrifying Dream (2014–2015) ===
By spring 2014, the band had reverted to the Morricones/Arnez/Champion quartet. In March, they announced the upcoming release of Scenes of Mild Peril (a combined live-in-session album and DVD recorded in Bridlington and London, featuring 14 tracks in audio and video form including four new songs). The same news update included details on the band's next studio recording, which Steven Morricone anticipated as being "a huge bloated double album with veerings into some unusual directions, lavish arrangements and more macabre intensity than we have achieved before."

In practise, the band opted to record and release a single album called The Terrifying Dream, which they recorded while working once again with Alan Smyth. Embracing the Pledge Music crowdfunding platform, they released the record in an integrated programme with three related EPs released to subscribers over the course of 2015. Both the album and the EPs followed a loose theme of sleep, sleep-deprivation, dreaming and nightmares. The first and second EPs—The Eye And Skin Machine and Worm Necklace—were named after recurring childhood nightmares suffered by bandmembers, while the third and final EP, The Sleeper Must Awaken, "urge(d) the listener to snap back into reality."

The Terrifying Dream was released on 11 July 2015, and was followed by Body of Evidence, a DVD compilation collecting together all of the Scaramanga Six's promotional videos between 2002 and 2015 (and also featuring 'That's Billiards', a documentary on the band's Chicago sessions with Steve Albini for the Phantom Head album). The band also triumphed in a couple of categories at the Pure Rawk awards, Paul Morricone winning Axe Hero of the Year and a reissued 'I Will Crush Your Heart' winning Video of the Year.

=== Chronica and Worthless Music (2016–present) ===
In November 2017, the Scaramanga Six fulfilled their previous promise of releasing "a huge bloated double album". Chronica (the band's second Pledge Music crowdfunded project) followed The Terrifying Dream in being a more purposefully unified set of songs, which the band described as forming "an abstract story roughly hewn from a concept of a dystopian island society. A place where everything has fallen into ruin, yet people still seem to have the same preoccupation with the trivial crap they had before. The population trudge through a chaotic existence on top of each other with absolutely no hope of a better life. Society is reduced to its base behaviour yet people still crave superficial fixes. The human condition carries on regardless. There is no outcome, no lessons to be learned. Familiar?" For the sessions, Steve Gilchrist guested once again as second drummer.

Chronica was the first Scaramanga Six album to be issued on heavyweight vinyl, and was preceded by three single releases. The first two were a couple of double-A-sided singles, "Dirty Subaru/A Car" (released in July 2017) and "As We Take the Stage/Owned" (released in September 2017), the former described as "two motoring-related tracks from a land where beaten-up racers clog the car parks and lay-bys." A third single, "Stabby Fork" followed in early November 2017.

Following another period of reduced activity (during which the various members concentrated on other activities), the Scaramanga Six released Worthless Music in December 2021. Over the previous five months, it was preceded by four download-video singles, "Horse with No Face" (July 2021), "An Error Occurred" (September 2021), "It is the Face That Wish How" (October 2021) and "Big Ideas" (November 2021).

== Related projects by the Morricone brothers ==
Paul Morricone has a parallel solo career which so far has produced three studio albums and one live album. Having previously worked as a video director with Poison Pen Films, he now runs his own video production company Thunder & Lightning.

Steven Morricone's solo work has gone no further than very occasional solo live performances as The Steven Morricone Tyranny in his current base of Weston-super-Mare, where he co-manages the Sunfold guest house/hotel (occasionally the venue for his "Unfold" alternative music events). In the past, he has also played bass guitar in Eureka Machines, and saxophone for Leeds psychedelic dance-rock band Kava Kava.

The Morricone brothers have occasionally played as an acoustic duo called The Disclaimers, and also formed the rock trio Being 747 with former Landspeed Loungers songwriter Dave Cooke (which divided its time between pop songs and school educational projects about natural history, evolution and cosmology).

== Band members ==
=== Current ===
- Paul Morricone – vocals, guitars, saxophones, keyboards, synthesizer, dulcimer, Suzuki Qchord, tuned & untuned percussion (1995–present)
- Steven Morricone – vocals, bass guitar, keyboards, saxophones, double bass, synthesizer, dulcimer, tuned & untuned percussion (1995–present)
- Julia Arnez – guitars, vocals, Stylophone, occasional drums (1996–present)
- Gareth Champion – drums (2006–present)

=== Occasional ===
- Stephen Gilchrist – drums, percussion, bass guitar (2003, 2004, 2010, 2012–2013 – currently an occasional guest member)

=== Former ===
- Bill Bailey – guitar (1995–2000)
- John Gulliver – organ, piano, keyboards, violin (1995–2003)
- Emma Calvert – vocals, drums (1995–1996)
- Jem Bowden – drums (1995–1999)
- James Agnew – drums (2000–2002)
- Jenny Harris – guitar, organ (2001–2002)
- Anthony Sargeant – drums, backing vocals (2004–2006)
- Chris Catalyst – piano, organ, bass guitar, percussion, trombone, backing vocals (2005–2008)
- James Kenosha – drums (2006), piano (2012–2013)

== Discography ==
=== As The Scaramanga Six ===
==== Studio albums ====
- The Liar the Bitch and Her Wardrobe (1999, Trinity Records)
- Strike! Up the Band (2002, Wrath)
- Cabin Fever (2004, Wrath)
- The Dance of Death (2007, Wrath)
- Songs of Prey (2009, Wrath)
- Cursed (2011, Wrath)
- Phantom Head (2013, Wrath)
- The Terrifying Dream (2015, Wrath)
- Chronica (2017, Wrath)
- Worthless Music (2021, Wrath)
- GLUT (2025, Wrath)
- DEARTH (2025, Wrath)

==== Compilation albums ====
- Hot Flesh Rumble – The Scaramanga Six Live in Session (2008, Wrath)
- An Introduction to the Scaramanga Six (2010, Wrath – revised 2014, further revisions scheduled for the future)
- Scenes of Mild Peril – The Scaramanga Six Live in Session 2013–2014 (2014, Wrath)

==== Singles and EPs ====
- "Scaramanga Six/Landspeed Loungers/Chest" (1997, private release – split three-song cassette with Landspeed Loungers and Chest, sold at one gig)
- Are You One of the Family? EP (2001, Wrath)
- The Continuing Saga of the Scaramanga Six EP (2002, Wrath)
- "You Do, You Die" (2002, Wrath – split single with Les Flames)
- "The Poison Pen" (2003, Wrath – split single with Beachbuggy)
- "We Rode the Storm" (2004, Wrath)
- "Horrible Face" (2005, Wrath)
- "I Wear My Heart on My Sleeve" (2005, Wrath – split single with Me Against Them)
- "Baggage" (2006, Wrath)
- "I Wear My Heart on My Sleeve" (2007, Wrath – re-release of previous release with new B-sides)
- "Walking Through Houses" (2008, Wrath)
- "Autopsy of the Mind" (2011, Wrath)
- "Trouble" (2011, Wrath)
- "I Will Crush Your Heart" (2012, Wrath)
- The Eye and Skin Machine EP (2015, Wrath)
- Worm Necklace EP (2015, Wrath)
- The Sleeper Must Awaken EP (2015, Wrath)
- "Dirty Subaru/A Car" (2017, Wrath)
- "As We Take the Stage/Owned" (2017, Wrath)
- "Stabby Fork" (2017, Wrath)
- "Horse with No Face" (2021, Wrath)
- "An Error Occurred" (2021, Wrath)
- "It Is the Face That Wish How" (2021, Wrath)
- "Big Ideas" (2021, Wrath)

==== Video releases ====
- Scenes of Mild Peril – The Scaramanga Six Live in Session 2013–2014 (2014, Wrath)
- Body of Evidence (2015, Wrath)

=== As Scaramanga ===
- Tetsuya (1995, privately released demo tape)
- Big Themes And Incidental Music (1996, privately released demo tape)
- Stereo Car Chase (1996, privately released demo tape)
- The Liar, The Bitch And Her Wardrobe (1996, privately released demo tape, entirely different from later album with same title – not confirmed in biography text)
- "Vamp" (1997, Double Plus Records – split single with Slot Jockey)
