= Cabin Fever (Scaramanga Six album) =

Studio album by the Scaramanga Six
- Released: November 2004
- Genres: Alternative rock; art rock; rockabilly
- Length: 45:09
- Label: Wrath
- Producer: Tim Smith

The Scaramanga Six chronology
Strike! Up the Band (2002)	Cabin Fever (2004)	The Dance of Death (2005)

Cabin Fever is the third album by English rock band the Scaramanga Six.

== Background ==
Following the promotional dates for the second Scaramanga Six album (2002's Strike! Up the Band), multi-instrumentalist Jenny Harris and drummer James Agnew both left the band. A new drummer, Steve Gilchrist, joined the remaining lineup of Paul and Steven Morricone, Julia Arnez and keyboard player John Gulliver.

To produce the next album, Cabin Fever, the Morricones approached one of their longtime musical heroes – Cardiacs leader Tim Smith. In an interview with ireallylovemusic.co.uk around the time of the album's release, Paul Morricone asserted that "Tim Smith has been making mindblowing music with Cardiacs for years and years. We wanted to work with one of our all-time heroes. So we sent him some stuff and he agreed to record us – It’s the ultimate compliment when someone whose work you’ve admired for a long time really likes what you do."

Encouraged by Smith, Cabin Fever saw The Scaramanga Six deliberately moving towards a noisier, less polished production style. Paul Morricone commented at the time "Strike! Up The Band was made up of several recording sessions in different places and sounded like it. Cabin Fever has a complete sound to it. We also thought that the next logical step for us would be to do what we did on Strike! Up the Band but much more extreme – louder, faster, slower, more dynamic, more uncomfortable. The next album will push the envelope even more."

Many of the songs on the album mythologised the band's struggles (as private individuals and as independent musicians) with Paul Morricone reflecting in an interview that "the title suggests the feeling of being locked up in claustrophobic rooms, sweaty and uncomfortable. That’s exactly what it was like doing the album. We spent an unhealthy amount of time together to get this done and illness and disease spread to epidemic proportions while we recorded. There were buboes upon buboes and cabin fever really did set in. We like to think that the insanity and deprivation is apparent when listening to the album." Three songs on Cabin Fever – "The Coward", "Horrible Face" and "Poison Fang" – were re-recordings of songs from the band's 1999 debut album The Liar the Bitch and Her Wardrobe (which at the time was no longer available).

During the first recording session for Cabin Fever, the Scaramanga Six were a five-piece. However, John Gulliver (who'd been an intermittent band member for the previous two years) left the band for the final time prior to the second session, resulting in him only playing on five tracks. As the Scaramanga Six adapted to being a quartet, Steven Morricone took on most of the band's keyboard duties both live and in the studio.

Cabin Fever was released in April 2004. The band toured around the UK to support the album, and released two EPs from it – "We Rode The Storm" (November 2004) and "Horrible Face" (May 2005).

== Reception ==
Cabin Fever was well received by the press. Writing in Drowned in Sound, Dom Courlay commented "as we tiptoe graciously through all the wannabe Libertines and second-rate U2s to find something genuinely original, unique and inspiring, it seems dear old Leeds has come up with the goods again. Not content with giving us the incendiary quirkiness of iForward Russia! and Bowie-esque pop thrill of Duels already this year, the intense-yet-aloof rock operas of The Scaramanga Six could be its most omnipotent discovery yet… This should be the record that finally makes the rest of the country sit up and take notice…. a record that veers between pure operatic cacophony ("Pincers") and Rocky Horror-esque satire done in a Damned stylee... audacious in the extreme but without being overwrought and pretentious, making it a more enjoyable experience with every listen."

Trakmarx stated "The Scaramanga Six have talent, taste & humour in spades – all they need now is your patronage" while Gigwise commented that "Cabin Fever makes you laugh, stroke your imaginary goatee, dance like a frog on E and shit your pants in one hearing." In the Leonard's Lair webzine, Jonathan Leonard wrote "This band are huge-sounding in every way from the rich bluesy vocals to the aggressive guitar work and immense rhythm section… The Scaramanga Six don't sound like too many other bands at the moment but they share a vitriol and song-based punk ethic that recalls the early work of The Stranglers." On Get Ready To Rock.com, Marty Dodge suggested that the band produced "a bizarre mixture of Tom Jones-ish lounge music (mostly due to their lead singer's voice), Spandau Ballet and the latest in jangly power pop. The mixture creates something that is rather delightful and amusing... Horribly catchy and deceptively clever this lot have everything you want to power pop. The Leeds boys done rather good really."

For Leeds Music Scene, Rob Paul Chapman wrote "Rarely has an album that'd still fit on one side of a C90 broken so much new ground and yet still remained perfectly accessible. It can be hard work at times and if you make it through in one sitting you may end up with brain-ache the first time around, but it'll be one you come back to again and again. Quite simply, indispensable." Chapman also took note of the album's underlying themes and execution, writing "Soul Destroyer may well be one of the finest opening tracks committed to disc anywhere, let alone in Leeds. It is an evocative and biting hymn to the desolation, frustration and all round miserable experience that can be life in an up-and-coming band sometimes… If this all sounds like some kind of contrived muso-winge, the truth couldn't be any more different. Underneath the self-depreciating blacker-than-black humour lays the distinct strain of optimism found uniquely in people who, through a mixture of belief and sheer bloody-mindedness, continue to carry the torch for what they set out to achieve. The theme for both track and the album seems to be triumph over adversity. It's the notion that if you want something enough, are prepared to work for it and have the raw determination to plough stubbornly on towards your goal despite all of the logic, misfortune and outside advisors telling you otherwise, then you will eventually get there."

Reviewing the Horrible Face EP in Drowned in Sound and paying particular attention to the title track, Toby Jarvis called it "a big-bellied bastard of a 'ballad’... a chunky in-yer-face noise that, perhaps for the first time in a large and enviable body of work, does justice to the band's monstrously fierce playing and their sense of drama'" and compared the band to "a British Queens Of The Stone Age"

== Track listing ==
All tracks are written by Paul Morricone/Steven Morricone.

No.	Title	Length
1.	"Soul Destroyer"	4:23
2.	"Smite My Face!"	2:44
3.	"The Poison Pen"	3:04
4.	"Pincers"	3:34
5.	"We Rode the Storm"	2:55
6.	"Unclean"	4:08
7.	"A Song for You"	5:53
8.	"The Electricity Bill"	2:20
9.	"Poison Fang"	4:32
10.	"The Coward"	6:23
11.	"Horrible Face"	5:13

== Personnel ==
=== The Scaramanga Six ===
- Paul Morricone – vocals, guitars, electric piano
- Steven Morricone – vocals, bass guitar, organ, piano
- Julia Arnez– guitars, vocals
- Steve Gilchrist – drums, percussion, tambourine, vibraslap, cabasa

=== Guest musicians ===
- John Gulliver – piano/organ/synthesizer (3,4,7,9,10)
- Susan Bixley – timpani, tambourine, guiro
- Rhodri Marsden – musical saw
