= Strike Up the Band =

Strike Up the Band may refer to:

- "Strike Up the Band (Here Comes a Sailor)" a 1900 song by Andrew B. Sterling and Charles B. Ward
- Strike Up the Band (musical), a 1927 Broadway musical with music by George and Ira Gershwin
- "Strike Up the Band" (song), a song from the 1927 musical
- "Strike Up the Band", a 1930 Screen Songs animated cartoon using the 1900 composition
- Strike Up the Band (film), a 1940 musical film starring Judy Garland and Mickey Rooney
- Strike Up the Band (Tony Bennett and Count Basie album), a 1959 album by Tony Bennett with Count Basie and his Orchestra
- Strike Up the Band (Red Garland album) (1981)
- "Strike Up the Band", a song by Poison from Native Tongue (1993)
- Strike! Up the Band, a 2002 album by The Scaramanga Six
- Strike Up the Band (Little Feat album) (2025)
