= Eureka Machines =

British pop rock band

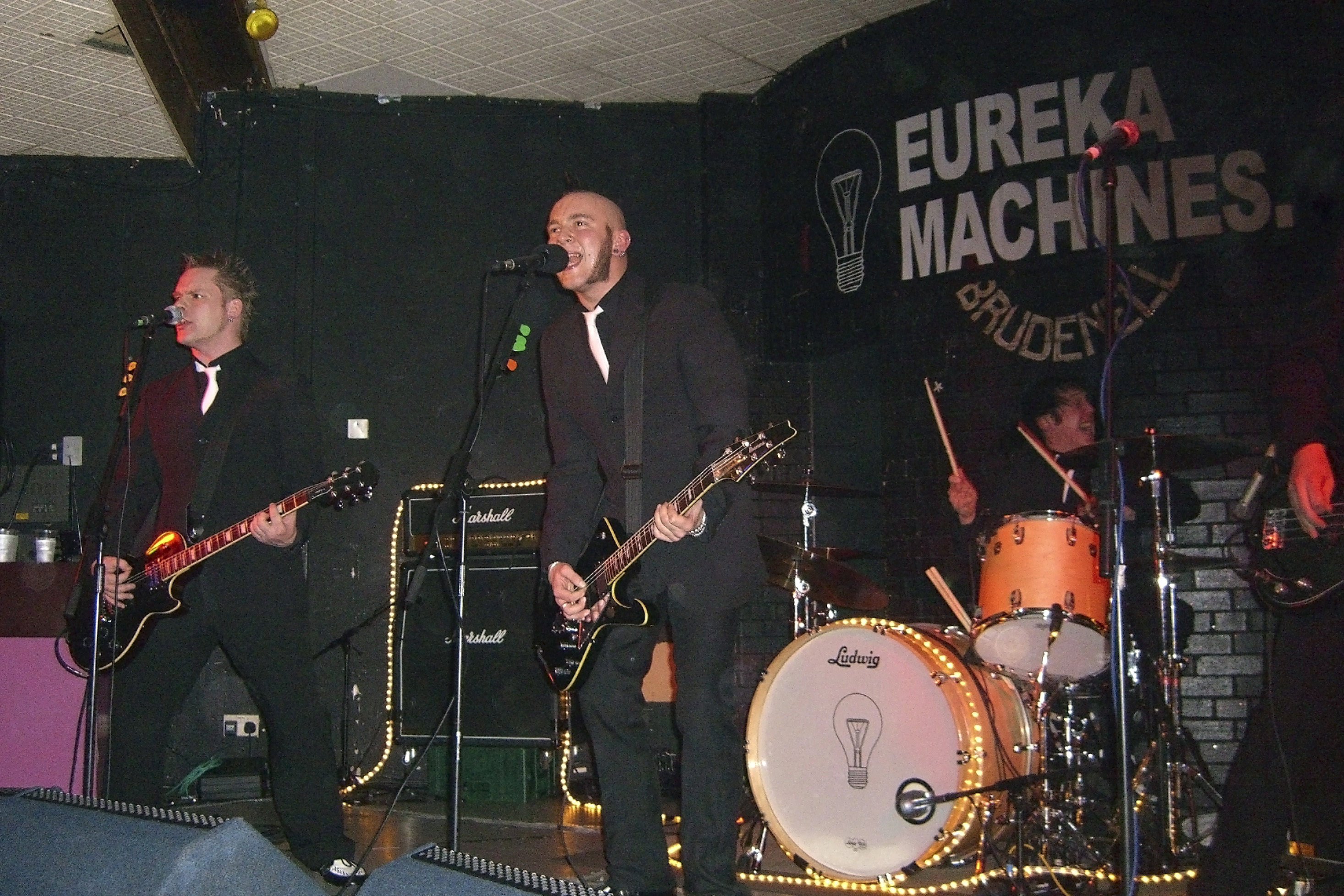
- Eureka Machines performing live at the Brudenell Social Club in 2009

Background information
- Origin: Leeds, West Yorkshire, England
- Genres: Pop rock; power pop
- Years active: 2007–present
- Label: Wrath
- Members: Chris Catalyst; Davros; Pete Human; Wayne Insane
- Past members: Steven Morricone
- Website: eurekamachines.com

Eureka Machines are a British pop rock band based in Leeds, West Yorkshire, England, who formed in 2007. The band consists of Chris Catalyst (also of The Sisters of Mercy and The God Damn Whores) on lead vocals & guitar, Davros (aka Dave) on guitar & backing vocals, Pete Human on bass guitar & backing vocals and Wayne Insane on drums. Described as "power pop" by Classic Rock magazine, they are something of a cottage industry, putting out their own records and being self-managing and self-promoting while also touring and gaining press coverage and airplay at a national level.

== Formation and origins ==
Eureka Machines began with Chris asking Wayne to join but since Wayne was still committed to his previous band, Chris had to wait for him to become available before they could start working together in 2007 on early tracks. Some of these tracks then appeared on MySpace in August 2007. Dave/Davros and then Steve Morricone (also of The Scaramanga Six) were invited to join the band.

All 4 members had previously been in other local, and in some cases more well-known acts. Chris Catalyst is a current member of The Sisters of Mercy, The God Damn Whores and was previously in AntiProduct, The Scaramanga Six, The Dead Pets, Catylyst (with 2 'y's) and used to do a solo act as Robochrist which he has described as being currently on indefinite hold. Steve Morricone is a founding member of The Scaramanga Six and also plays with Kava Kava and Being 747. Wayne Insane had previously been in Vatican Jet and Orka. Dave had previously played alongside Chris in Catylyst but had then taken a break from music before being invited back to join Eureka Machines.

The band played their debut gig supporting Forward Russia at the Brudenell Social Club on 14 December 2007 (a line-up which also included The Scaramanga Six). Further local gigs followed, with 3-track demo CDs being sold at the shows.

From the start they had a uniform appearance onstage, wearing black suits with white ties and matching T.U.K. shoes. Chris has described this as being part of the act: "so many bands nowadays look the same. I wanted to stand out from that."

== Early momentum ==
In February 2008 the band were asked to appear as support on a UK tour with Ginger of The Wildhearts, this was an acoustic tour with Chris and Dave playing acoustic as support. During the tour they sold their original demo CD and a limited edition 6-track live acoustic session CD, selling almost 500 CDs over the 13 date tour.

In March the band appeared on the Raw Talent show on BBC Radio Humberside to do a live session, again acoustic (9 March). Regular airplay followed on both BBC Radio Humberside and BBC Radio Leeds with another full band live session being broadcast on 5 October 2008.

In April a planned UK tour supporting AntiProduct was cancelled due to health problems within the AntiProduct camp. Instead they quickly organised their own local dates instead, and amongst other gigs they played Live at Leeds, a local weekend-long festival which saw Eureka Machines play twice on Saturday 3 May, once during the afternoon as part of Live at Leeds and again in the evening at local rock night 'Rock of Ages'.

In July the band recorded their first videos with Ash TV, one was a promo for the track Everyone Loves You, the other was a spoof version of MTV Cribs which appeared on YouTube in early August. More live videos were recorded at another local festival, Leeds Unity Day on 16 August.

Their largest live date for the summer was being asked to appear on the BBC Introducing Stage at the Reading and Leeds Festivals.

== Debut album: Do or Die ==
The debut album Do or Die was released on local label Wrath Records (run by Steve and Paul Morricone) on 1 September 2008 both digitally and physically, with an album launch party taking place the same day in local Leeds curry house The Bengal Brasserie. The album was both self-released and self-produced, and grew out of recordings Chris had started with additional tracks being added on in stages. The album was mastered by Jase Edwards (of Wolfsbane and The God Damn Whores) and as well as guitar, bass and drums it included Chris playing piano, trombone and xylophone and Steve playing saxophone.

Describing the album, Chris said 'it's basically like rock and roll cabaret - a big heap of rock music that makes people smile'. Do or Die gained positive reviews from Kerrang!, Classic Rock, Rock Sound, Leeds Guide, Sandman magazine, No Title magazine and Black Velvet Fanzine, as well as airplay on BBC Radio 1, BBC 6 Music, Xfm, Channel Five, MTV2, Scuzz and various local stations.

== Touring and further releases 2008 to 2012 ==
Following the album release the band toured throughout September 2008, including supporting The Wildhearts at their sold out show at Shepherd's Bush Empire on 20 September. More touring followed throughout January and February 2009.

Increasing workload led to a parting of the ways as Chris Catalyst left The Scaramanga Six in October 2008 to concentrate on Eureka Machines (although he remains a member of The Sisters of Mercy) and Steve Morricone left Eureka Machines in February 2009 to focus more on The Scaramanga Six and the educational Being 747 show 'Amoeba to Zebra'. Both parties have been quoted as saying they still remain friends. Steve was replaced on bass by Pete Human, previously from Leeds band The Gushers.

In May they released the single "Everyone Loves You" and album title track "Do Or Die" was made Classic Rock magazine's track of the day. The single was supported with further live dates both headlining and supporting other artists such as Ginger of The Wildhearts, Laika Dog (featuring Tony from Terrorvision), The Stranglers and Sigue Sigue Sputnik.

In the summer of 2009 they played festivals including Guilfest, Moor Music Festival, Wickerman Festival and Trashstock in Nottingham.

Single "Being Good is Okay, but Being Better's Better" was released as a free download on 2 September through their website, with a video to accompany it made by Paul Morricone of Poison Pen Films.

Classic Rock Magazine featured the band again in November 2009 by putting "The Story of My Life" on a cover mounted CD.

In December the band completed their biggest UK tour to date, supporting Electric Six for 14 dates throughout the UK & Ireland in Academy venues.

At the end of the year they were featured in a piece in American Spin magazine where the album Do or Die was reviewed as a 'gem you may have missed'.

In January 2010 Eureka Machines were included on a charity download album called The Haiti Project put together by Round Records.

On 2 December 2010, Eureka Machines released the first single from the second album, "These Are the People Who Live in My House", as a free download on their website, premiering the video at the same time.

In early 2012 the band flew to Poland for a couple of dates in April, and played some one-off shows in the UK at events like the 'Kill your idols' all dayer in Manchester and a Mick Ronson Legacy show in Hull.

On 11 October 2012, Eureka Machines appeared in the British soap opera Emmerdale playing at a fictional music festival. The festival 'HomeFields 2012' was filmed as part of the soap’s 40th birthday celebrations. The full festival line up was Scouting for Girls, The Proclaimers, DeLorean Drivers, Eureka Machines and folk singer Brendan Croker.

== Second album: Champion the Underdog ==
Work started on recording album two, entitled Champion the Underdog, at the start of February 2010. The album was recorded throughout 2010 and early 2011 in a variety of studios before being released on 3 May 2011 on Wrath Records. The album was produced by Jase Edwards and Chris Catalyst, and features guest artists including Steve and Paul Morricone (from The Scaramanga Six) on saxophone and vocals and Willie Dowling (Honeycrack, Jackdaw4) on strings & piano.

Other reviews from local and national press were also positive:

- “It retains all that was good about the first album and, adds a depth of song writing and performance that make this an excellent follow-up... 4 out of 5” – Leeds Guide.
- “One of the most entertaining and special bands the UK has to offer right now” – Uber Rock.
- “Brilliant slices of catchy pop rock” – Contact Music.
- “If there’s any justice, this should be the album that finally breaks down the walls and makes the world sit up and take notice of the Eureka Machines.” – Pure Rawk.
- “This band, without question possess the most “fun” rock ‘n’ roll sound (and best dress-sense) in all of Yorkshire’s rock scene. 4 out of 5” – Soundsphere.
- “Eureka Machines have a winning formula that they want to bring to the table, the fun, bop and bounce ricochets through this album. 8.5 out of 10” - This is not a scene.

To support the release the band toured extensively in May and June 2011. The track made available via the website upon the album's release, "(I’m) Wasting My Time (Yet Again)" was featured in Classic Rock’s Heavy Rotation section in June 2011: “With one of those monster ‘woah-oh’ choruses, this new song from the Eureka Machines proves that their debut album of sparkling power pop wasn’t a fluke.”

== Pledge campaigns for third and fourth albums ==
In October 2012 the band launched a PledgeMusic campaign for their third album, Remain in Hope. The pledge page went live on 25 October, and had reached the target amount within 2.5 hours. By the time the project was completed, they'd raised over 500% of their target from over 1,200 pledgers. Fans received video updates, covers and an acoustic album for taking part. The album was released to the public on 21 February 2013.

For the fourth album Brain Waves they returned to PledgeMusic with a more ambitious target in November 2014 to make a new album and a DVD and raised 100% of their funding within 80 minutes of going live. By the end of the pledge campaign the total was 390%. The first incentive fans received was an EP of cover versions called Remain in Eighties. This was followed by a Christmas raffle in which Chris gave away his trademark Ibanez guitar.

The album was released on download exclusively to pledgers in the first instance, and the band hosted a virtual listening party on Facebook and Twitter to celebrate on 26 March 2015. Brain Waves was released officially on Monday 11 May 2015, accompanied by a new video from the band for the song "Brainwaves" (difference in spacing intentional) filmed in the back of their van while on tour. The video was made Video of the day on the Pure Rawk website

"Brain Waves" entered the UK rock album chart at number 3, behind Guns N' Roses and Fall Out Boy. It also appeared in the Indie chart at number 12 and the official album chart at 75. The album was supported with an 11 date tour throughout May 2015 which ended with an appearance at Camden Rocks festival.

== Solo activity and time out ==
In 2016 the band took some time off to spend time with their families and focus on other projects. Chris Catalyst released a solo album Life Is Often Brilliant via PledgeMusic and played a special one off show to mark the release at the Brudenell Social Club with Baby Chaos supporting and Eureka Machines headlining.

== Awards ==
In 2010 Eureka Machines won both 'Frontperson of the Year' and 'Band of the Year' at the Pure Rawk Awards. The annual awards held in London are voted on by the readers of Pure Rawk webzine.

The 2011 Pure Rawk awards received over 11,000 votes, from which the band were awarded 'Best Video' (for "These Are the People Who Live in My House", produced by AshTV) and received a nomination for 'Best Drummer'. To celebrate the win, AshTV released a bloopers video of behind the scenes footage which was also featured on the Pure Rawk website.

At the 2012 Pure Rawk Awards the band were nominated for five awards and came home with two: 'Bassist of the Year' for Pete and 'Album of the Year' for Champion The Underdog.

In 2014 the band were nominated for 4 Pure Rawk Awards and won 3: 'Album of the Year' for Remain in Hope, 'Band of the Year' and 'Frontperson of the Year'.

In 2015 Eureka Machines continued their Pure Rawk success, this time with four awards: 'Drummer', 'Bass Player', 'Frontperson', and 'Band' of the year.

== Discography ==
=== Studio Albums ===
- Do or Die (2008, Wrath Records)
- Champion the Underdog (2011, Wrath Records)
- Remain in Hope (2013, Wrath Records)
- Brain Waves (2015, Wrath Records)
- Victories (2018, Pledge Music)
- Everything (2025, Wrath Records)

=== Live Albums ===
- Live at Leeds, 2014 (2021, Wrath Records)

=== Compilations ===
- Rarities (2018, Wrath Records)

== Members ==
Current Members

- Chris Catalyst - Lead Vocals, Guitar (2007 - present)
- Davros - Guitar, Backing Vocals (2007 - present)
- Pete Human - Bass, Backing Vocals (2009 - present)
- Wayne Insane - drums (2007 - present)

Former Members

- Steven Morricone - Bass, Backing Vocals (2007 - 2009)

Timeline
