= The Dance of Death (Scaramanga Six album) =

Studio album by the Scaramanga Six
- Released: 12 March 2007
- Genres: Alternative rock; art rock; psychobilly
- Length: 44:29
- Label: Wrath
- Producer: Tim Smith

The Scaramanga Six chronology
Cabin Fever (2004)	The Dance of Death (2007)	Hot Flesh Rumble - The Scaramanga Six Live in Session (2008)

The Dance of Death is the fourth album by English rock group the Scaramanga Six.

== Background ==
The Dance of Death was the second of the Scaramanga Six's albums to be produced by Tim Smith of Cardiacs. It was also the only studio album to feature multi-instrumentalist Chris Catalyst as part of the line-up, as well as drummer Anthony Sargeant.

In a 2004 interview before the album sessions, Paul Morricone noted the increasing macabre tone in the band's songcraft - "The new material for the next album seems to be themed with violent murder. There’s a new song about a man who kills his victims with cyanide then performs a macabre dance with their corpses. There’s also a beautiful song based on John Fowles' The Collector which is all about a man who stalks, kidnaps, imprisons and eventually kills his ideal woman… If you want to see a macabre pantomime, try watching Cannon & Ball doing the winter season at Blackpool – it's like watching death. What we do is often called 'black humour' – do you laugh or do you shit your pants?"

== Reception ==
Manchester Music described the album as "a dangerous beast... the kind that should be muzzled and owned only on special licence. The Scaramanga Six make big albums and The Dance Of Death could be their hugest yet... a shrewd song writing style that owes as much to The Divine Comedy as it does Hugh Cornwell... The bloody rattle of "Helvetica" is endemic of an album that's immersed in semi-gothic humour and seriously angular new alt.rock anthems and ballads." Jo Williams, in Gigwise, described the album as "ten epic tales of self confessed evil pop bastardry... this CD grabs you by the throat and strokes your face, like a lover who has been drinking whiskey until all hours. You never quite know what it’s going to do next. But you know it's going to be a grand gesture… The passion and skill in this CD is palpable in every play... The Dance of Death takes every little trendy boy and hangs him with his own skinny tie."

On Leeds Music Scene, Richard Garnett recalled that "Cabin Fever, the Six's last outing, punched you in the face from the off, it splattered your knackers (if you have them) all over the room with a hefty boot… The Scaramanga Six serve up a distinctly more accessible vibe on The Dance of Death with tracks like the string laden pounding-prog-romp "Baggage", the glam-grit of "I Wear My Heart On My Sleeve" or the camped up rocker "Helvetica". From pace changing opener "The Throning Room" the scene is set for a monster of an album with songs evolving as they leap around the room shedding skins of rock as they smash up your stuff… "Sunken Eyes" finds the band on a rarer more meaningful note tackling the not so trivial subject of domestic violence, "Hide the bruises on your arm" scream the vocals halfway through and the band rip into yet another rock tangent before showing off with a seamless quick switch to some lounge jazz... the clever bastards. Throughout, the sense of rock opera is never far away and leaves the listener desperately searching for some sort of narrative. The narrative if any is of course the band's unique perspective on life with a penchant for the theatrical."

In Drowned in Sound, Dom Gourlay commented "The Dance of Death sounds like 'Bohemian Rhapsody' after being stripped down into ten segments by Kwikfit before each one was rebuilt by a team of three-chord wonders with alarmingly distinctive voices." He also states, later in the piece, that the new record is "...as grandiose a record as anyone who'd previously listened to the Scaramanga Six would expect, with the Morricone brothers Paul and Steve in fine form", praising their The Dance of Death immensely.

Trakmarx wrote "The pace is frenetic throughout, the sarcasm withering, the songs as expansive & ambitious as ever. On The Dance of Death, the Scaramangas sound wound up to the point of apoplexy - & it shows. Throughout it all, the group’s love of Bowie, Pulp & all things suave are wrapped around the core of this record like a favourite old scarf encasing a soar throat on a particularly chilly winter’s morning."

On the Leonard's Lair website, Jonathan Leonard concluded "The Morricone brothers love their harmonies, there's a liberal use of strings, a sense of humour (on the excellent "The Collector", "coincidence" is mis-pronounced to rhyme with "silence") and - for a relatively modest record label - the production of The Dance of Death sounds huge. Rock-solid riffs and semi-operatic vocals propel "Vesuvius", "Sunken Eyes" features a great melodic twist, "I Wear My Heart on My Sleeve" boasts a cracking punky chorus, whilst "Towering Inferno" lives up to its immodest title. So although their tongues remain firmly in cheeks, the Scaramanga Six remain a serious musical proposition."

== Track listing ==
All tracks are written by Paul Morricone/Steven Morricone.

No.	Title	Length
1.	"The Throning Room"	3:28
2.	"Baggage"	4:10
3.	"The Collector"	2:59
4.	"Vesuvius"	4:59
5.	"Sunken Eyes"	6:23
6.	"I Wear My Heart on My Sleeve"	4:22
7.	"Helvetica"	3:58
8.	"Lifeblood Running Dry"	1:48
9.	"I See Red"	5:22
10.	"The Towering Inferno"	7:00

== Personnel ==
=== The Scaramanga Six ===
- Paul Morricone – vocals, guitars, baritone saxophone
- Steven Morricone – vocals, bass guitar, tenor saxophone
- Julia Arnez – guitars, vocals
- Chris Catalyst - keyboards, bass guitar, trombone, drums, backing vocals
- Anthony Sargeant - drums

=== Guest musicians ===
- Mike Scott – arrangements (including "Horrible Face" and "Walking Through Houses")
- Tim Smith – timpani, bell
