= The Liar the Bitch and Her Wardrobe =

Studio album by The Scaramanga Six
- Released: 1999
- Genres: Alternative rock, art rock, psychobilly
- Length: 61:39
- Label: Trinity Records
- Producers: Alaric Neville, Mark Simms, Gareth Edwin Parton

The Scaramanga Six chronology
The Liar the Bitch and Her Wardrobe (1999)	Strike! Up the Band (2002)

The Liar the Bitch and Her Wardrobe is the debut album by English rock band The Scaramanga Six.

== Background ==
Having established themselves on the Yorkshire live circuit between 1995 and 1999, the Huddersfield-based rock band Scaramanga renamed themselves The Scaramanga Six shortly before recording their debut album. The Liar the Bitch and Her Wardrobe was recorded "in various places" over sessions across 1997 and 1998, with about half of it produced from a live studio session at the Electric Press complex in Leeds. Although it was recorded quickly and with minimal overdubs for budgetary restrictions, it did feature a string section and horn players on certain tracks.

The Liar the Bitch and Her Wardrobe is the only Scaramanga Six album to feature the band's original drummer Jem Bowden, and the only one on which Julia Arnez performed as a third lead singer (fronting the band on "With Deepest Sympathy" and "The Man With the Perfect Aim" and duetting with Steve Morricone on "Vamp") and occasional drummer. On all subsequent albums and EPs, Arnez would restrict her vocal contributions to backing or harmony vocals, and play guitar rather than drums.

The Liar the Bitch and Her Wardrobe is also the only Scaramanga Six album to have been released on Trinity Records – the quickly-assembled precursor to the band's own Wrath Records label, on which all subsequent Scaramanga Six recordings would be released. Produced in a relatively limited run, the album was unavailable for many years afterwards, with Steven Morricone commenting "Fuck knows where they all went. It’s fair to say that for our first few years we didn’t have a clue what we were doing business-wise, however we have known exactly what we are doing music-wise from the off." The album was eventually reissued on Bandcamp as a download-only release, with "Disenchanted Melody" and "Are You One of the Family?" (two otherwise unavailable songs taken from 2000's Are You One of the Family? EP) added as bonus tracks.

Several songs on the album would later be re-recorded for other releases. "Singer of Songs" would reappear on the band's 2001 EP The Continuing Saga of The Scaramanga Six while "Poison Fang", "The Coward" and "Horrible Face" would all be re-recorded for 2004's Cabin Fever album. The re-recorded "Horrible Face" also served as the lead track on a 2005 EP.

== Track listing ==
All tracks are written by Paul Morricone/Steven Morricone.

No.	Title	Length
1.	"The Coward"	6:39
2.	"Horrible Face"	4:54
3.	"My Baby is Dead"	3:49
4.	"Sleep With Me"	4:47
5.	"Raging Torrent of My Love"	4:48
6.	"With Deepest Sympathy"	3:33
7.	"Vermin"	4:02
8.	"Singer of Songs"	5:08
9.	"The Man With the Perfect Aim"	4:26
10.	"Poison Fang"	4:24
11.	"Choking"	4:32
12.	"Vamp"	3:12
13.	"Ten Plagues"	7:25

== Personnel ==
=== The Scaramanga Six ===
- Paul Morricone – vocals, guitars, baritone saxophone
- Steven Morricone – vocals, bass guitar, tenor saxophone
- Bill Bailey - guitar
- Julia Arnez – vocals, additional drums
- John Gulliver – organ, piano, electric piano, synthesizer
- Jem Bowden – drums

=== Guest musicians ===
- Paul Swannell, Guy Giblin, Jo Barclay, Suzanne Hurst – violins
- Andrew Moore – viola
- Chris Atkinson – cello
- Pat "Herb" Fulgoni – trumpet
- Neil Newson – tenor saxophone
- David Bates – trombone
