= Hot Flesh Rumble =

Hot Flesh Rumble - The Scaramanga Six Live in Session

Compilation album by The Scaramanga Six
- Released: 2008
- Genre: Alternative rock, art rock, psychobilly
- Length: 78:47
- Label: Wrath Records
- Producer: Phil Mayne

The Scaramanga Six chronology
The Dance of Death (2007)	Hot Flesh Rumble - The Scaramanga Six Live in Session (2008)	Songs of Prey (2009)

Hot Flesh Rumble - The Scaramanga Six Live in Session is a compilation album by The Scaramanga Six. It compiles live-in-the-studio recordings made for radio between 2004 and 2007, and was released in between the band's fourth and fifth studio albums.

== Reception ==
Reviewing the album in Vibrations magazine, Rob Paul Chapman wrote "It would be easy to conclude that these are just off-cuts and make-weights but the scale of the songs in such a confined environment breathes new life into the recorded work... Shorn of the bells and whistles, with the energy of a live performance, there is a strong argument for "Elemental" and "Pincers" to be considered the definitive recordings"

== Track listing ==
All tracks are written by Paul Morricone/Steven Morricone.

No.	Title	Length
1.	"Elemental"	4:48
2.	"Pincers"	3:30
3.	"Baggage"	4:10
4.	"The Throning Room"	3:10
5.	"We Rode the Storm"	3:17
6.	"Smite My Face"	3:05
7.	"You Do, You Die!"	2:41
8.	"Soul Destroyer"	4:45
9.	"Last Roll of the Dice"	5:04
10.	"Damned if You Don't, Damned if You Do"	2:40
11.	"Trouble"	4:03
12.	"Walking Through Houses"	4:57
13.	"I Wear My Heart on My Sleeve"	4:52
14.	"Autopsy of the Mind"	5:26
15.	"Lifeblood Running Dry"	1:58
16.	"Vesuvius"	5:35
17.	"Sunken Eyes"	6:52
18.	"The Towering Inferno"	7:54

== Personnel ==
- Paul Morricone – vocals, guitars, baritone saxophone
- Steven Morricone – vocals, bass guitar, tenor saxophone
- Julia Arnez – guitars, vocals
- Chris Catalyst – organ, piano, backing vocals, trombone, drums
- Gareth Champion – drums (tracks 9–18)
- Anthony Sargeant – drums (tracks 1–8)
