= The Leeds Guide =

British publication

The Leeds Guide was a monthly "What's on" magazine published in Leeds, West Yorkshire, England from 1997 until 2012. It was the longest established 'What's on' magazine for Leeds. Originally a monthly A5 magazine printed in black and white, The Leeds Guide changed to an A4 fortnightly in 2003 and subsequently went back to being published monthly.

Modelled on London's Time Out magazine, The Leeds Guide was information heavy, featuring numerous reviews of bars and restaurants as well as preview of arts and music events.

== Publications ==
Leeds Guide Limited also published a monthly free magazine for Harrogate called Plush Magazine as well as two annual guides called Dining Out and Student Guide and a variety of contract work, including programmes for local events like Opera In The Park and Classical Fantasia.

In 2009, both Plush Magazine and The Leeds Guide relaunched their websites, with the intention of creating expansive online guides and community spaces for Harrogate and Leeds respectively.

In February 2012 it was announced that The Leeds Guide had ceased publication after publishers Leeds Guide Ltd went into administration; however, the website continues in publication.
