= Strike! Up the Band =

Studio album by The Scaramanga Six
- Released: 2002
- Genres: Alternative rock, art rock, psychobilly
- Length: 47:31
- Label: Wrath Records
- Producers: Jamie Lockhart, Carl Rosamond, Gareth Edwin Parton

The Scaramanga Six chronology
The Liar the Bitch and Her Wardrobe (1999)	Strike! Up the Band (2002)	Cabin Fever (2004)

Strike! Up the Band is the second album by English rock band The Scaramanga Six.

== Background ==
Rather than being produced as an album, the material for Strike! Up the Band was cherry-picked from Scaramanga Six sessions and recordings spanning 2000 to 2002. Approximately half of the album's material had been previously released. "Grasp the Candle" and "Ladies and Gentlemen" came from 2000's Are You One of the Family? EP, while 2001's The Continuing Saga of The Scaramanga Six EP provided its title track plus "Pressure Cage" and "Big in a Small Town".

Two tracks from the album were released separately. "You Do, You Die!" became the Scaramanga Six half of a split single with Les Flames, while "Too Cool for School" was included on the first Wrath Records compilation.

During this period, The Scaramanga Six underwent several personnel changes, resulting in this being the last band album until 2013 to feature a six-piece lineup. Guitarist Bill Bailey left the band during the sessions for Are You One of the Family? in 2000, and consequently played on only one track on the album (contributing the fuzz guitar to "Rush of Blood"). Bailey's replacement, guitarist/organist Jenny "Jet" Harris, left the band in 2002 following the completion of Strike! Up the Band, as did drummer James Agnew. Keyboard player John Gulliver departed midway through the sessions for the subsequent album Cabin Fever.

== Reception ==
In Kerrang!, Essi Berelian wrote " a cracking fourteen tracks of wilful weirdness peppered with retro-riffing, parping saxophones and mad-genius keyboard special effects; B-movie chic combined with real musical muscle. Best of all this is an album that surprises from start to finish; a track such as "Pressure Cage" may rip it up big style, but just around the corner you'll find the band's slightly poppier side with the glam clap-along of "Too Cool For Skool". And it's all shot through with a sly sense of humour. An album of genuine theatrical variety. Excellent."

In Rock Sound Ronnie Kerswell described the band's music as "strutting, arse-out garage-rock-with-a-twist... their tunes twist and turn with guitar eccentricities and lunatic Moog injections, and are as raw as scraping your knuckles on a cheese-grater. There’s the seemingly straightforward "Bane Of My Life" or the clap-rock of "Too Cool for Skool", but underneath there's a seething underbelly of madness! Step aside The Hives and co – this is retro-rock with panache!"

== Track listing ==
All tracks are written by Paul Morricone/Steven Morricone.

No.	Title	Length
1.	"Six Six Six"	0:41
2.	"The Wrath of the Mighty"	4:04
3.	"Pressure Cage"	2:43
4.	"You Do, You Die!"	2:47
5.	"Bane of My Life"	4:10
6.	"Elemental"	4:48
7.	"Too Cool for School"	2:53
8.	"Rush of Blood"	3:15
9.	"Stray Dog"	3:42
10.	"Big in a Small Town"	4:12
11.	"Grasp the Candle"	3:08
12.	"The Continuing Saga of The Scaramanga Six"	3:39
13.	"The Lingering Death of The Scaramanga Six"	3:34
14.	"Ladies and Gentlemen"	3:56

== Personnel ==
=== The Scaramanga Six ===
- Paul Morricone – vocals, guitars, baritone saxophone
- Steven Morricone – vocals, bass guitar, tenor saxophone
- Julia Arnez – guitars, vocals
- John Gulliver – organ, piano, synthesizer
- Jenny "Jet" Harris – guitar, organ
- James Agnew – drums
- Bill Bailey – guitar ("Rush of Blood" only)

=== Guest musicians ===
Jamie Lockhart – violin
