= Thomas Truax =

American songwriter, performer, and inventor

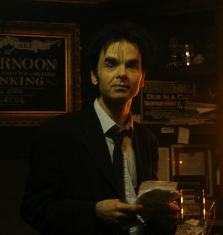
- Truax in 2010

Background information
- Origin: New York City, United States
- Genre: Art rock
- Years active: 2000–present
- Label: Various labels
- Website: www.thomastruax.com

Thomas Truax (/ˈtruːæks/ TROO-aks) is an American songwriter, performer, animator, and inventor of experimental musical instruments.

== Biography ==
Thomas Truax with 'The Hornicator' at the Innocent Village Fete August 2007

Truax first came to prominence as a solo performer in the 1990s in New York City as one of a group of musicians and songwriters (including Lach, Jeffrey Lewis, Curtis Eller, The Burning Hell, Dibs, Boo Hoo and Beck) who made up the antifolk movement based around the Sidewalk Cafe on the Lower East Side of Manhattan. Truax's emergence as a solo act came after years of fronting bands (most notably Like Wow). The move was in part to remove the need to rely on other people to perform and to embark in a new direction that would distinguish his act from the hundreds of bands and singer-songwriters active in New York. This new direction involved the construction and playing of unique instruments, as well as more traditional singer-songwriter style songs. The "inventor" side of his musical act drew on his work as an animator on MTV's Celebrity Deathmatch and a fascination since early childhood with building objects out of whatever materials he had available. Thomas's use of "primitive" technology, the often fantastical elements of his songs and gothic overtones (his website talks of his instruments "as though plucked straight from the mind of Tim Burton") have led to him being linked to the subgenre of steampunk.

Truax's first two instruments were the Cadillac Beatspinner Wheel and the Hornicator, the former being a system of spinning wheels, metal spokes and small cymbals, which, through the use of various contact mics, "beats out" through the PA a primitive drum beat that forms the backing to songs that Thomas then plays on guitar. Its large size made the Beatspinner Wheel unsuitable for touring, so Truax created a smaller version, entitled "Sister Spinster" that he uses to this day. The Hornicator started life as an old gramophone record horn, before Truax added a set of strings, a kazoo and a microphone. Here Thomas beats out the rhythm on the horn's metal casing (using a ringed finger to create a 'click' and other fingers to create a contrastive "thud") which is then repeated through the use of a looper pedal that records the beat and loops it over the PA, allowing Thomas to add more layers of other instrumentation (through the strings and other implements attached to the Hornicator). Finally Thomas sings a vocal through a microphone attached to the instrument.

Other instruments work as variations on automatic rhythms and looped beats: the Stringaling features a vaguely bongo-like drum at the top of a length of clothes drier tubing to which is attached a variety of musical devices with pull-strings; Mary Poppins features a metal column attached to which are two arms that fly out to the side and spin, creating a train-like rhythm; the Backbeater, made up of several rotating spokes, straps on to Thomas' back and spins to create a low rhythm. Some songs do not feature any of his inventions, most notably "Inside the Internet" which is played solely on guitar, and "The Butterfly & The Entomologist", which is again played on a guitar, albeit with the use of a pocket fan that Thomas used to hit the strings to produce an eerie effect. Common themes in Thomas's songs include love, loneliness, travel, the animal kingdom, nature and technology.

Truax was once challenged to show how he makes an instrument. Given many items retrieved from a recycle bin, within 15 minutes he created a rhythmic invention which he looped through effects with water and rubber bands.

Though Truax usually only performs solo, his records contain songs with full band arrangements, along with his invented instruments. He has been featured in several music documentaries including Adam Clitheroe's "One Man In The Band" (2008) and Gabriel Shalom's "Instrumental" (2005).

In 2013, Truax composed a new original score for Henrik Ibsen's play Peer Gynt, which was staged at the Theater Dortmund, Germany during its 2013/14 season, with music performed live by Thomas in an open metal container suspended above a stage of water.

In 2020, Truax began work in Berlin recording with British drummer Budgie (Peter Clarke), formerly of Siouxsie and the Banshees who played along with Thomas’s mechanical drum machine Mother Superior. A single ‘A Wonderful Kind of Strange’ was released in April 2020. A full album ‘Dream Catching Songs’ followed in January 2023.

Truax maintains a subscription fan-site, offering exclusive content, "work in progress" videos, etc.

== Singles ==
- "The Haunted Thrift Shop", "Inside the Internet", "Sucked Inside" CD 'Singles Club 9' single on Homesleep Records (Italy) (2004)
- "Hornicating With Sister Spinster" 5 Songs + 2 episodes of the Wowtown News radio show. Limited edition tour-Only EP, self-released (2004)
- "Have We Been Left Behind" b/w "Lessons In Art" aA2W/021 Limited Edition 7" vinyl, Akoustik Anarkhy Records, Manchester (2006)
- "There Is A Light That Never Goes Out" b/w "Like A Fallen Tree" SL Records (2007)
- "Stranger On A Train" (remix) b/w "One Piece At A Time" SL Records (2008)
- "Joe Meek Warns Buddy Holly" b/w "We're So Heavy" SL Records (2009)
- "Feelin' Bad For Dracula" – Thomas Truax With Brian Viglione (Psycho Teddy Records October 31, 2014)
- "A Wonderful Kind Of Strange" – Thomas Truax & Budgie (Psycho Teddy Records April, 2020)

Compilation tracks

- "Chicken Coop Cooper" -The Wild West Most Wanted' Smoking Gun Records Compilation (2004)
- "Shooting Stars" Remixed version Truck Records festival compilation 'Truck Seven' (2004)
- "John The Waiter" Luv-A-Lot Records (LV-12) 'A Luv-a-lot Compilation' (2003)
- AS GUEST: The Leg (artist) "A Musical Tribute to the Forest of Dean" (8 song vinyl lp – 2006) Thomas plays Stringaling
- AS GUEST: Duke Special (artist) On the album 'I Never Thought This Day Would Come' (Universal/V2 2008) Thomas appears as guest vocalist in the song "Flesh and Blood Dance", portraying the ringleader in a ballroom of skeletons. He also added some Stringaling.
- "Audio Addiction" Ballroom of Romance compilation Count Records Dublin (July 2007)
- "Our Trip To Blunderland" (Truax/Cynics) 'Newest One 08' Thomas contributed piano to this Kitchen Cynics song-a-day song compilation (2008)
- "Moon Catatonia" was featured on Stranger Than Paradise/Gyspy Madness compilation (2008)
- AS SONGWRITER: Duke Special 'The Silent World Of Hector Mann' (Reel to Reel Recordings, 2009) Truax wrote the song "The Prop Man" on Hornicator, it was performed by Duke Special and featured a full band.

== Albums ==
- Full Moon Over Wowtown (Psycho Teddy Records, US/Breakin' Beats, Europe – 2002)
- Audio Addiction (Psycho Teddy Records, US/Breakin' Beats, Europe – 2005)
- Why Dogs Howl at the Moon (SL Records – 2007)
- Songs from the films of David Lynch (Psycho Teddy Records, SL Records – 2009)
- Sonic Dreamer (Psycho Teddy Records, SL Records – 2010)
- Monthly Journal (Blang – 2012)
- Trolls, Girls & Lullabies (Psycho Teddy Records – 2014)
- Jetstream Sunset (Psycho Teddy Records – 2015)
- All That Heaven Allows (Psycho Teddy Records – 2018)
- Dream Catching Songs Thomas Truax with Budgie and Mother Superior (Blang Records/Psycho Teddy Records – 2023)

== See also ==
- Experimental musical instrument
- Steampunk musicians
