= Stephen Gilchrist =

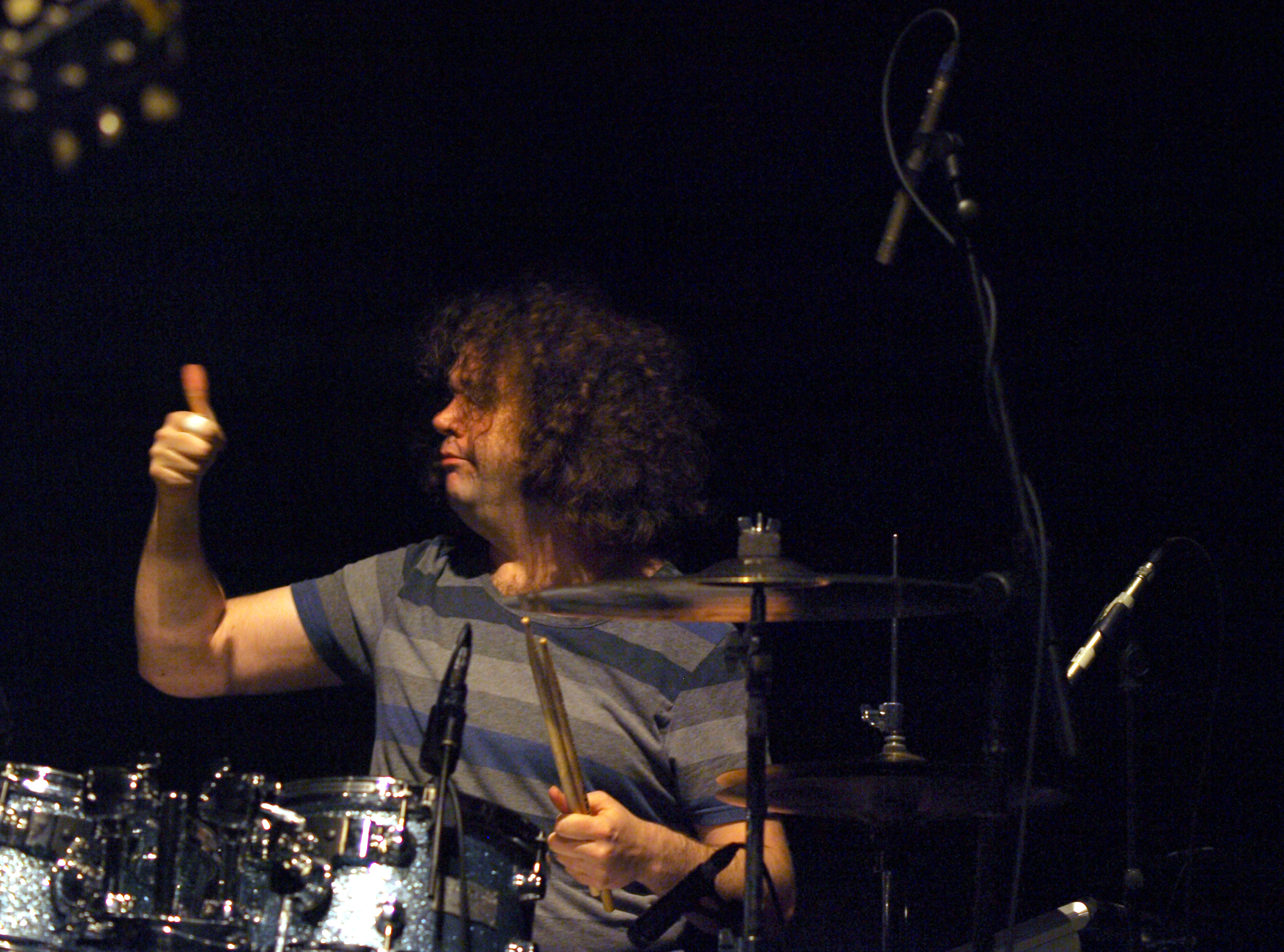
- Gilchrist with Graham Coxon in 2012.

Background information
- Also known as: Stephen Evens; Stuffy
- Born: Stephen Paul Gilchrist; January 1975 (age 51)
- Occupations: Musician; composer; director; educator; producer; engineer; singer-songwriter
- Instruments: Drums; percussion; vocals; guitar; viola
- Member of: Stuffy/The Fuses; Bug Prentice; Hot Sauce Pony
- Formerly of: The Scaramanga Six; Art Brut; The Monochrome Set; Spratleys

Stephen Paul Gilchrist (born January 1975) is an English musician from London who also teaches drums and guitar across London. Gilchrist releases music under the name Stephen Evens (stylised Stephen EvEns) and wrote and recorded under the name Stuffy with his band Stuffy/The Fuses (whose second album, Angels Are Ace, was recorded by Steve Albini) from 2003 to 2009, reforming in 2023.

He is best known as the drummer in Blur guitarist Graham Coxon's live band, and also appears on Coxon's live albums, Burnt to Bitz: At the Astoria and Live at the Zodiac, and on the single "Bloody Annoying / What Ya Gonna Do Now?".

Gilchrist supplied the drums for the Graham Coxon and Jimmy Pursey's single supporting the England national football team at the 2006 FIFA World Cup. The song was a re-working of the Sham 69 hit "Hurry Up Harry", and was released as "Sham 69 and The Special Assembly". "Hurry Up England" entered the UK Singles Chart at #10. In 2013 he joined Art Brut, replacing founding member Mikey Breyer.

He has also toured and recorded with Charlotte Hatherley, Cardiacs and Cathy Davey. Other drumming duties include the Monochrome Set (from 2022 to 2025), Spratleys (2024) and Interrobang! a collaboration between Dunstan Bruce from Chumbawamba and Stephen Griffin of Regular Fries.

Gilchrist is the grandson of the conductor Kathleen Riddick.

== Related bands ==
Other bands and musicians Gilchrist has played with include:

- Doo The Moog
- Art Brut
- Hero Fisher
- The Godfathers
- Local Girls
- Pop-A-Cat-A-Petal
- Jennifer Gentle
- Magoo
- Conor Deasey (ex-Thrills)
- Republica
- Beachbuggy
- Queenadreena
- Chris T-T
- Glam Chops
- Fuck Off Piss Off
- Keith John Adams
- Quint (with Sally Young of Ut)
- The Scaramanga Six
- Sarandon
- Vic Reeves & Bob Mortimer
- Pierre Guimard
- The Lightning Seeds
- Alan Tyler & Sean Reed (ex-Rockin' Birds)
- The Damned
- Cardiacs
