= Chris Catalyst =

English guitarist

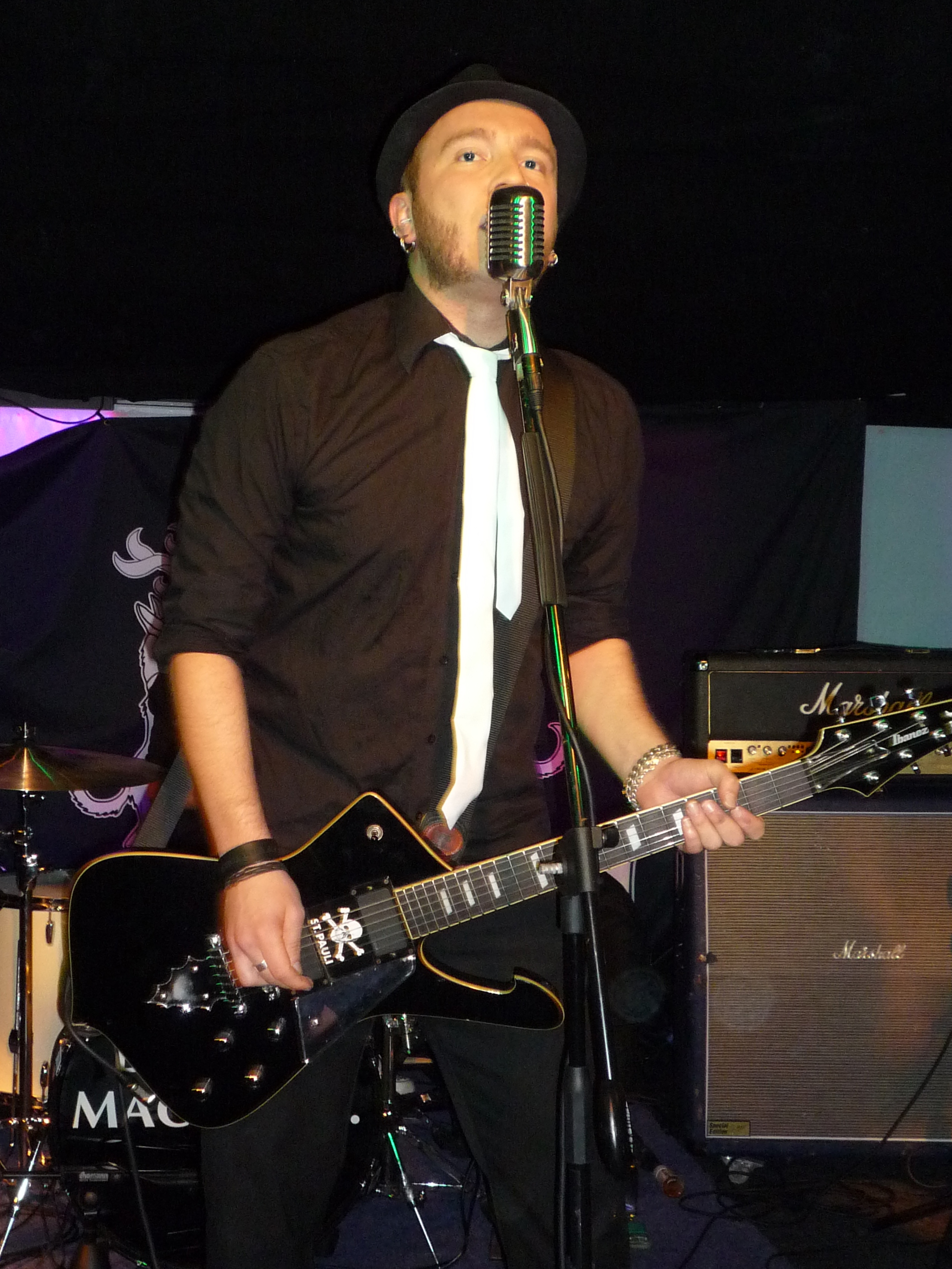
- Catalyst performing with Eureka Machines in Worcester

Background information
- Also known as: Robochrist
- Origin: England
- Genres: Rock, punk, pop
- Occupations: Musician, songwriter
- Instrument: Guitar
- Website: chriscatalyst.com

Chris Catalyst is a British rock guitarist, known for his work with the Sisters of Mercy, Ugly Kid Joe, Ginger Wildheart, Terrorvision, the Professionals, Mariachi El Bronx, the Scaramanga Six and his own band, Eureka Machines, as well as his more recent solo career. In 2022, he confirmed that he was a 'Nameless Ghoul' that toured with the Swedish rock band Ghost.

== Career ==
=== The Sisters of Mercy ===
Catalyst joined the Sisters of Mercy as rhythm guitarist and backing singer in 2005.

Despite collaborating with Andrew on the first new Sisters material in almost a decade, in 2019, frustrated with Eldritch's slow-paced work ethic, and becoming more busy and successful with his own projects, Catalyst stepped down from the band.

Chris rejoined the band for their Autumn 2023 European tour, performing the duties of the Nurse (operator of the Doktor Avalanche drum machine).

=== Eureka Machines ===
In 2007, Catalyst started the group Eureka Machines, singing and playing guitar again, as well as writing the songs.

Debut album Do Or Die was released in September 2008 on the Wrath Records label. It received a five-star review in national newspaper The Sun. Do or Die also gained positive reviews from Kerrang!, Classic Rock, Rock Sound, Leeds Guide, Sandman magazine, No Title magazine and Black Velvet Fanzine. Catalyst recorded and mixed the album from his home studio.

It was followed by the second album Champion The Underdog in May 2011, which was supported by tours in both the UK and Europe. This was recorded and mixed by Catalyst and Jason Edwards. The Sun once again awarded a positive review, saying 'Eureka Machines could be the best band you've never heard'.

In 2012, the band appeared in the British soap opera Emmerdale, playing at a fictional music festival, filmed as part of the soap's 40th birthday celebrations. It was Catalyst's second appearance on Emmerdale, following his 2004 appearance as a Dingle at a family party. The band reverted to crowdfunding for their third release, Remain In Hope, released following a successful campaign on PledgeMusic in February 2013. This was promoted with tours supporting the Wildhearts and Gogol Bordello. This album was recorded and mixed by Catalyst and Andy Hawkins at Cottage Road in Leeds.

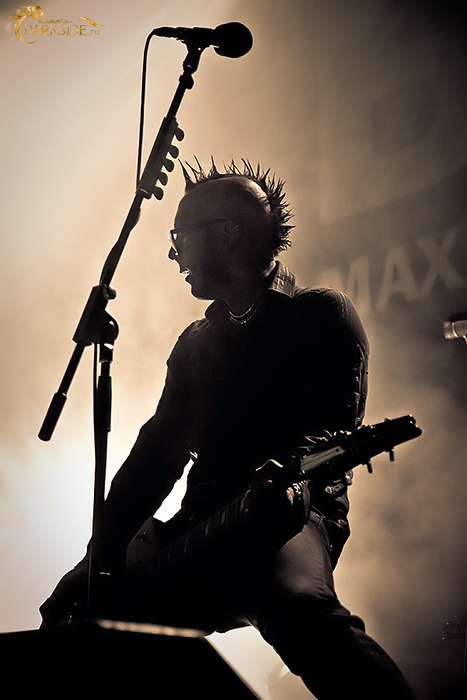
Catalyst performing in 2009

Fourth album Brain Waves followed in May 2015, following another successful PledgeMusic campaign. This ended up hitting the UK charts at Number 75, as well as making Number 3 in the rock charts and Number 1 in the Indie Breakers chart. This album was recorded and mixed by Catalyst and Andy Hawkins at The Nave in Leeds.

In April 2019, Eureka Machines released fifth album Victories, again appearing on the Wrath Records imprint. This release was augmented by a double-album called Rarities which catalogued the band's unreleased activity over the decade, and a selection of covers the band have recorded.

Eureka Machines also released a double-disc DVD in 2015, featuring the band's set from the Brudenell Social Club in November 2014, as well as all of their promo videos and outtakes to date.

On April 11, 2025, Eureka Machines released their sixth studio album Everything, again on Wrath Records, produced by Dave Draper. this was promoted with a spring tour across the U.K. Summer 2025 saw Eureka Machines supporting Ugly Tour Kid on a small tour across the U.K.

=== Solo career ===
In January 2017, Catalyst released his debut solo album, Life Is Often Brilliant, upon which he performed all of the instruments apart from some piano and keys, which were provided by Willie Dowling and Bryan Scary.

In April 2021, Catalyst followed this up with Kaleidoscopes, upon which again he performed all of the instruments apart from the drums, which were provided by Jason Bowld. This hit No 3 in the UK Rock Chart and 25 in the Official Album Chart. It was supplemented with videos for "Make Good Art" (featuring author Neil Gaiman), "The Ride" and "King Of Everything".

On October 7, 2022, Catalyst released his third studio album, Waiting in the Sky on Wrath Records. This was an album of David Bowie covers

On October 6, 2023, Catalyst followed up with his fourth album, Mad in England, also on Wrath Records.

=== Ginger Wildheart/the Wildhearts ===
In 2005, Catalyst supported the Wildhearts in the UK and Japan, as 'Robochrist', a techno-metal comedy act he started In 2004. Catalyst performed backing vocals on the Ginger Wildheart album Yoni, recorded with Tim Smith and released in January 2007).

Catalyst helped record the concept album Market Harbour with Tim Smith and released in January 2008. Catalyst was involved in the electronics and production, as well as backing vocals.

In 2011, helped write and record the 555% triple-album, along with Willie Dowling, Jon Poole, Fyfe Ewing and Ritch Battersby. The album charted at Number 9 in the UK charts.

2013 saw Catalyst, Ginger, Jon Poole, Rich Jones, Denzel, Victoria Liedtke and Brian Scary collaborate for the Albion album. Another crowd-funded effort, this was described as 'spine tingling' and given 4/5 by Classic Rock magazine.

In 2021, Catalyst contributed backing vocals for the Wildhearts' ninth studio album 21st Century Love Songs, which peaked at 9 in the UK Album Charts.

Later that year, Wildhearts guitarist CJ contracted COVID-19, leading the band to ask Catalyst to step in for him for a number of shows on their 21st Century Love Songs album tour.

=== Ugly Kid Joe ===
Having been a touring guitar technician for American rock band Ugly Kid Joe on a tour with Skid Row in 2013, when guitarist Sonny Mayo, who filled in for rhythm guitarist Dave Fortman, was unavailable, Catalyst performed lead and rhythm guitar for a seven-week UK/Europe tour. Catalyst returned to Ugly Kid Joe in 2016 for some dates and 2023 for the end of their Rad Wings of Destiny USA leg, filling in for Fortman. Catalyst has been touring with Ugly Kid Joe since, bringing high-energy guitar and backing vocals.

=== The Professionals ===
In 2017 Catalyst contributed guitars to the reformed Professionals album What In The World. This was reprised on the 2021 album 'SNAFU', which also featured Billy Duffy, Phil Collen and Chris McCormack. Catalyst joined for a tour in Summer 2021.

=== Ghost ===
At the end of Ghost's European tour in April 2022, Catalyst revealed himself on Twitter as one of the band's "Nameless Ghouls". Catalyst has been playing the role of rhythm guitarist, Nameless Ghoul 'Aether' since 2017, with the band members previously hidden identities now public. As of 1 June 2023, he reported that he was no longer a member of Ghost.

=== Other work ===
Catalyst also played second drums and keyboards for Huddersfield band the Scaramanga Six from 2004 to 2009, recording the albums The Dance Of Death, Hot Flesh Rumble and Songs Of Prey with Tim Smith.
