= Wrath Records =

Wrath Records is a British small independent record label founded in 2002 and based in Leeds, Yorkshire, England. Unlike some independent labels, Wrath does not feature backing from any major record companies. Wrath Records release material on CD albums and singles, and also ran the Supersevens Singles Club (a subscriber-only series of vinyl seven-inch singles, each of which were split between two different artists). The label is associated with Poison Pen Films, Paul Morricone's film production company.

The label was originally set up by Steven and Paul Morricone of The Scaramanga Six to produce and market their own records, the label has expanded to release material by other artists.

== Roster ==
- Beachbuggy
- Being 747
- The Bilderberg Group
- Champion Kickboxer
- Chris T-T
- Chuck
- Engerica
- Eureka Machines
- Farming Incident
- Galitza
- Instant Species
- The Interiors
- Landspeed Loungers
- Les Flames
- Little Japanese Toy
- The Lodger
- Magoo
- Mama Scuba
- Me Against Them
- Piskie Sits
- The Playmates
- Sarandon
- The Scaramanga Six
- The Secret Hairdresser
- Stuffy/The Fuses
- The Terminals
- YSN
