= Paul Morricone =

English musician, songwriter and video director

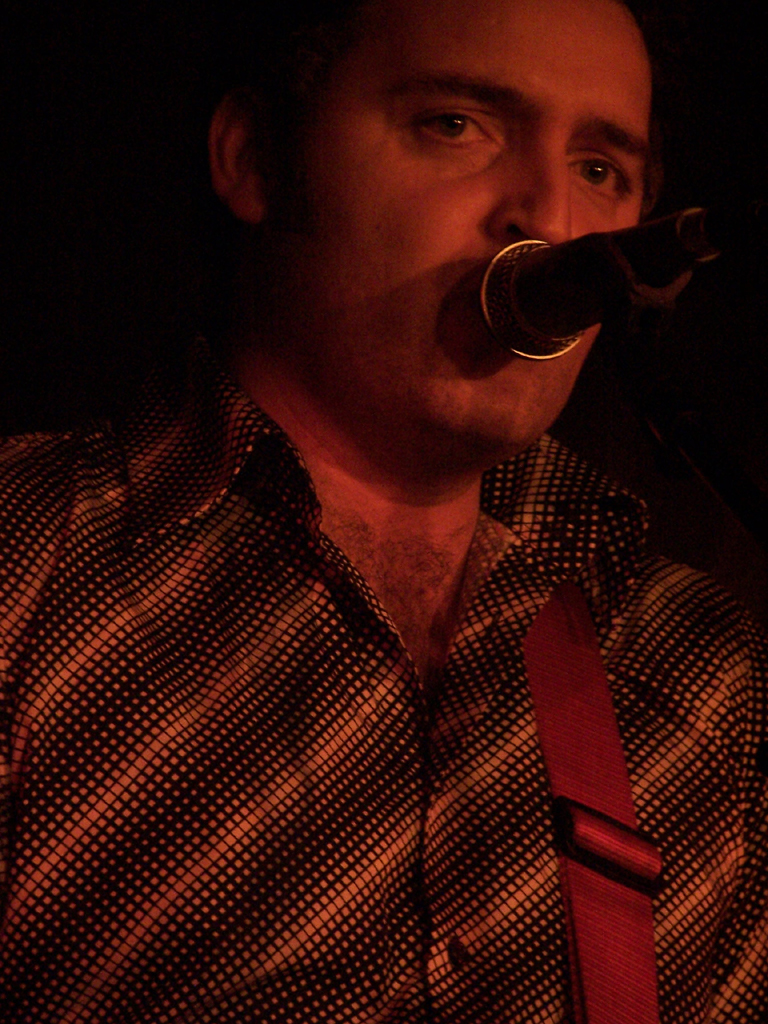
- Morricone with the Scaramanga Six in 2008

Background information
- Born: 8 November 1973 (age 52); Weston-super-Mare, Somerset, England
- Origin: Weston-super-Mare, Somerset, England
- Genres: alternative rock; orchestral pop; cinematic soul; art rock; rockabilly
- Occupations: Musician; singer; songwriter; record producer; video director
- Instruments: Vocals; guitar; saxophones; keyboards; synthesizer; dulcimer; Suzuki Qchord; tuned & untuned percussion
- Years active: 1988–present
- Label: Wrath
- Member of: The Scaramanga Six
- Formerly of: Being 747; Roger's Trout Farm; Supersaurus; Spawnmate
- Website: paulmorricone.com

Paul Morricone is an English musician, songwriter and video director. Best known as one of the two frontmen of the Scaramanga Six, he has also played with Being 747, and is currently also pursuing a solo career.

== History ==
=== Early years and bands ===
Paul Morricone was born in Weston-super-Mare, UK in 1973, half of a pair of musically inclined fraternal twin brothers (the other being Steve Morricone). The brothers began their musical careers as teenagers in 1988, both of them singing and playing saxophones in the Phobia, which developed into the deliberately eccentric rock band Roger's Trout Farm (also featuring future Spearmint guitarist James Parsons, whom the Morricones would also briefly work with in Supersaurus). Having switched from saxophone to guitar for Roger's Trout Farm, Paul rapidly developed as a songwriter, with Parsons noting in retrospect that "Paul... developed the envious skill of being able to place the listener in the song, making them feel connected, like they (were) being sung to."

=== The Scaramanga Six, the Disclaimers, Being 747 ===
In 1995, the Morricone brothers regrouped in Huddersfield to form The Scaramanga Six with another teenaged musical cohort, Julia Arnez (whom they'd played with in the Spawnmate project). The band has continued to the present day with the Morricones and Arnez as consistent members despite multiple personnel changes. With the two Morricone brothers as frontmen, Paul is responsible for writing and singing "about three-quarters of the songs" (the band's more melodious/crooner-type material). Although he is a multi-instrumentalist, he usually concentrates on voice and guitar.

Noted for their aggressive live act and their flamboyant and theatrical songs, the Scaramanga Six have released ten studio albums to date, plus multiple singles, EPs and live releases. Musically, the band has drawn diverse comparisons including "the Sex Pistols crossed with Queen";The Stranglers; Sonic Youth, Burt Bacharach and The Carpenters; Buffalo Tom, Hüsker Dü, The Dead Kennedys, Cardiacs, XTC, King Crimson, The Knack and Abba; Rainbow and Queens of the Stone Age. They've been described as "cinematic art-rock that combines thrashing guitars with orchestral and distinctly non-rock instruments to create something individual and that has instant replay value", as "riff-heavy, ballsy heavy rock (that) still throws in enough musical and lyrical curveballs to lift it out of the ordinary", and as delivering "instantly memorable riffs with many-layered lush vocals and a lot of heart." Entirely self-managed and self-releasing (via their own Wrath Records label), their independent business practices and active promotion of other artists has also seen them hailed as "the closest we'll see to a British answer to Fugazi" and described as "working entirely outside the indie scene, let alone the actual industry."

In between Scaramanga Six commitments, the Morricone brothers have also occasionally played as an acoustic duo called The Disclaimers and involved themselves in Being 747, a collaborative project with former Landspeed Loungers songwriter Dave Cooke. Being 747 divided its time between writing and performing pop songs, and writing and performing schools educational projects using songs to teach children about natural history, evolution and cosmology.

=== Initial steps ===
In mid-2009, Paul Morricone began performing intermittent solo acoustic sets of Scaramanga Six songs – one of which was released on Bandcamp as Paul Morricone Live @ All Hallows, Leeds 05/12/13 – but did not take this any further for another decade.

=== The Dissolving Man ===
In 2019, Paul began a full solo project under his own name, exploring the dark-pop aspects of Scaramanga work rather than the hard rock/rockabilly elements. The first evidence of this was the "Estranged" single, released on 10 June 2019. On his BBC Radio 6 show, Tom Robinson described the song as follows: "If there’d ever been a dream collaboration between Scott Walker and Massive Attack this is what it might have sounded like... so dense and ambitious: a huge widescreen soundscape where the harmonic surprises never stop coming."

21 July 2019 saw the release of Paul Morricone's self-produced debut solo album The Dissolving Man. The album was recorded with a live rhythm section of bass player Mitch Cockman and former Scaramanga Six drummer Anthony Sargeant, with TV/soundtrack composer Spike Scott taking Paul's original music loops and GarageBand programming and "recreat(ing) the string arrangements with a lot more whistles and bells on" for six of the album's tracks. In a review in Three Songs & Out, Andrew Forcer hailed Paul for "(having) mastered the disappearing art of songwriting" and described the album as "epic, cinematic, orchestral and very listenable... each song could be easily used in movie soundtracks, James Bond and the likes... If you like The Scaramanga Six, The Divine Comedy, Scott Walker, Sensational Alex Harvey Band or indeed good music, then The Dissolving Man by Paul Morricone is for you! It’s gotta be five stars from me."

Regarding the song contents, Paul commented (in an interview with The Sound of Fighting Dogs), "I’m a middle-aged man and things are falling off already. As you get older, you carry more baggage and life experiences with you. It is always good to incorporate things you observe from other people’s lives too. I mentioned that a lot of this was autobiographical but only as a reference to creating much more exaggerated stories to listen to. It is all a work of fiction but like any good crime writer, there has to be some element of darkness already in the mind to conceive of things."

Later in 2019 Paul also collaborated with Eureka Machines guitarist Dave "Davros" Archbold (as "The Paul Morricone and Davros Show") for a standalone single called "Nature Boy" released on 5 September 2019. A solo EP proper, December followed at the end of the year, on 1 December 2019. Dedicated "to anyone, anywhere who find themselves far away from the ones they love", it featured further orchestral arrangements by Spike Scott. Paul created a promotional clip for the title track, described as "a festive music video filled with twinkly lights and chocolate box visuals", with the confession "a simple trick for foreground interest – buy a load of coloured bottles with fairy lights in them from a pound shop and place them in front of the camera."

=== Cruel Designs ===
Almost exactly a year later (on 4 December 2020), Paul followed up The Dissolving Man with a second solo album Cruel Designs, which he described as "a cornucopial journey through the dark wanderings of the sub-conscious mind."

Reviewing, the Nite Songs webzine described Cruel Designs as "every bit as much of a dark and disturbing tour de force as those who are familiar with his day job band will expect... Easy listening Cruel Designs very much isn't, but there's definitely something about the sheer scope of it which makes it an engagingly dark listen with the mix of yearning vocals, lush orchestration and downright creepiness therein combining well to make something pretty good. Well worth a listen for those long dark nights of the soul."

Cruel Designs, in turn, spawned the Dreamfinder Remixes EP in July 2021, featuring contributions from Benbow, Debugger and Strss.

=== Go Sanction Yourself ===
Paul's third solo album Go Sanction Yourself (produced by Stephen Gilchrist at Brixton Hill Studios) was released on 19 April 2024. Promoting the album, Paul commented "this collection of songs is deeply cinematic and full of dark stories but with a pronounced stance on current affairs. I’ve found myself branching out into a more freely soulful mix of orchestration, dark dance and wonky beats."

Regarding the album content, Paul commented (in an interview with Just Listen to This) "I think I'm probably happy, angry and reflective at some point in every song. It's fair to say there are some very angry songs on this album though, many of which are explicitly about the passive acceptance of the state of our country. "I've Got You in the Palm of My Hand" pretty much sets this out from the start, which is a protest song about people giving up their right to protest. The album is called Go Sanction Yourself and is so called because sanction is a contronym – to approve of something whilst also to condemn it."

Hailing Paul Morricone as a "modern day Bryan Ferry" and Go Sanction Yourself as "an exceptional and accomplished album from a person who seems very much at the height of his power", Joyzine magazine noted that the album's "production, musical arrangements and playing throughout are exceptional" and observed that "Paul's main talent, apart from his suave good looks and rich velvety voice of course, is his ability to combine the classic with the unusual... to fuse classic influences with the avant-garde to create something unusual and unique... In amongst the strident piano and ascending bass lines there are creepy whispers and almost Penderecki style strings screaming, and a brass section and atonal sax from a Bernard Hermann noir thriller. Take also the frantic/frenetic textures of "People in My Way", with its nervous fast paced drumming and constant falling strings... There is also the spirit of Barry Adamson contained within, from his work with Magazine and The Bad Seeds, right through to his soundtrack and solo works, there is the similar combination between the orchestral and the avant-garde."

Reviewing the album for God is in the TV, Humphrey Fordham commented on "elements of baroque pop evoking a young and beautiful, well-dressed non-hippy couple cruising down a European boulevard circa 1969... While the album will inevitably make any (Scott) Walker fans sit up and take mental notes, there is a sense, on first listen, that this is a well-thought-out album that has its distinct mood festooned with krautrock and electronica... Go Sanction Yourself has a well-produced sense of universal appeal, and will generate enough enthusiasm to explore its prime influences as well as Paul’s previous work. A sense of poetic drama runs all the way through: a narrative by way of a multi-faceted aesthetic with superlatives in abundance."

Writing in Louder than War, Andy Kidd described the album as "a piece of work that reflects the disjointed times... an LP that moves in unexpected directions. Go Sanction Yourself presents drama and tension, reflecting Morricone’s perspective on the world around him. While Paul Morricone remains a DIY art-rocker, the album has been noted for its distinctive sound, whether heard on small speakers, broadcast media, or in cinematic contexts."

A single, "People in My Way" was released on 5 February 2024, with a self-directed video based on the art of Gilbert & George. The in-house review at Juno Download commented "Paul Morricone is clearly in no mood to suffer fools gladly here. With his powerful lungs turned up to eleven he lambasts anyone "standing still/or stopping suddenly" with just a hint of mischief and irony, we suspect. With a bed of Barry-esque strings and shit-kicking backbeats, everything from an unhinged sax solo to the occasional outburst of guitar and a piano outro to put Liberace to shame makes an appearance somewhere, making this an embarrassment of unexpected musical riches."

Paul himself commented "many times, people have come up to me and said "hey, you reckon you’re a crooner? Well, why don't you sing "My Way"?"... So here it is. My version of "My Way". Only it's about people in my way. It started with moulding a synth bass to sound like something out of the John Barry theme to On Her Majesty's Secret Service, then making the line plod around atonally like a meandering member of the public... As I'm getting older, I'm getting more impatient too. I’ve never been known to suffer fools, but these days you get two kinds of idiot in your way. Those who are oblivious who are a danger to themselves and those who know what they are doing and are a danger to everyone else. Perhaps this song is about someone other than me, who just sees other people as something in their path to be swept aside. You decide."

A second single and video, "Laughing At You", was released on 3 April 2024. In a Joyzine interview, Paul revealed "the full title to this song is actually ‘They’re Laughing at You, Not Laughing with You’ and is a message to anyone who thinks that a privileged Etonian is "just like one of us". You’ll be waiting a very, very long time for the rewards of their trickle-down economics, especially in places like Keighley and Dewsbury who got fooled by patriotic promises. Musically, I was trying to simplify things by writing over only a bass line. I was thinking along the lines of new wave electro bands like Blancmange or early Depeche Mode to inspire me for the LinnDrum programming. We wanted the organic drums to resemble the pots and pans that people have become accustomed to banging whenever they are told to celebrate something. The rest is a foray into eighties synths and funk minimalism you can clap outside your houses to. I’ve left room in some of these songs for the odd sax solo – always the baritone for me."

A companion remix album to Go Sanction Yourself — called Go Remix Myself — was released via Bandcamp on 8 August 2024. It featured remixes from Mo Wabb, The Big Boss, Orange Polygon, Ray Bentos, Flash Cassette, Benbow, Petrol Bastard, Sargerino and JP Delorian.

== Work in video ==
Paul Morricone previously worked as a video director with Poison Pen Films creating video promos for musicians including The Young Knives, The Pigeon Detectives, Graham Coxon, The Holloways, Eureka Machines Larrikin Love, Marvin The Martian, The Whip, The Go! Team, Little Man Tate, iLiKETRAiNS, Cold War Kids, Forward Russia, Gallows and Polytechnic as well as viral animations for The Charlatans. While with Poison Pen, he also created several Scaramanga Six videos.

Paul now runs his own full-service video production company, Thunder & Lightning Film Ltd. Clients have including the Universities of Bradford and York, Pizza Hut, Holland & Barrett, and the company has continued Paul's work on videos by The Scaramanga Six and Chris Catalyst.

In 2024, Paul commented "for some of my career I'd made a name for myself as a music video director, though these days have been put behind me for some time. You try working with an industry that wants it cheap, good and now. You can only have two of these three things. Still, I like to direct a music video every so often and I've got a full production company at my disposal."

== Influences ==
Paul Morricone has previously cited The Stranglers and Tony Bennett as being among his influences, resulting in the discovery that "there was much fun to be had in crooning and shouting in equal measures." In 2024, he expressed admiration for Ella Fitzgerald.

As a singer, he's also been compared to Tom Jones.

== Personal life ==
Morricone lives in Huddersfield, Yorkshire, England, allegedly because of "Marstons Chicken, Dixon's Milk Ices".

== Discography ==
=== as Paul Morricone ===
==== (studio albums) ====
- The Dissolving Man (Wrath Records, 2019)
- Cruel Designs (Wrath Records, 2020)
- Go Sanction Yourself (Wrath Records, 2024)

==== (compilation albums) ====
- Go Remix Myself (Wrath Records, 2024)

==== (live albums) ====
- Paul Morricone Live @All Hallows, Leeds 05/12/13 (Wrath Records, 2013)

==== (singles and EPs) ====
- "Estranged" single (Wrath Records, 2019)
- December EP (Wrath Records, 2019)
- Dreamfinder Remix EP (Wrath Records, 2021)
- "People in My Way" single (Wrath Records, 2024)

=== as The Paul Morricone and Davros Show ===
- "Nature Boy" single (Wrath Records, 2019)
