= Emma Stevens =

English singer-songwriter

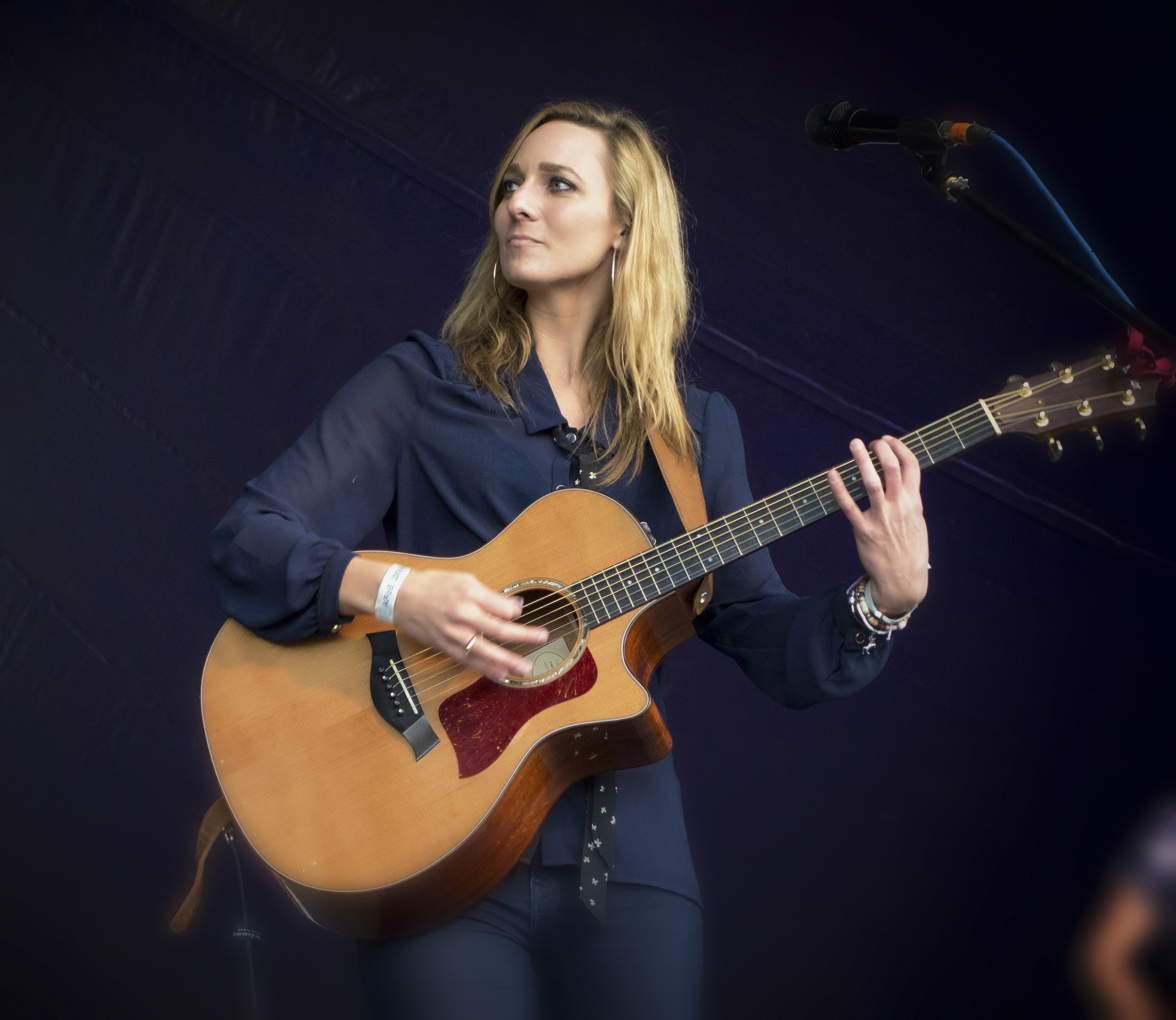
- Stevens in 2014

Background information
- Born: Emma Nadine Stevens; Guildford, Surrey, England
- Genres: Pop; country; folk
- Occupations: Singer-songwriter
- Instruments: Vocals; guitar; ukulele; mandolin; banjo; piano; cello; Bass
- Years active: 2008–present
- Labels: Emma Stevens Music Ltd; Rising Tide Music; Soft Rock Records; Bright Star Records
- Spouse: Sam Rommer (m. 2022)
- Website: emmastevensmusic.com

Emma Nadine Stevens is an English singer-songwriter based in Guildford, Surrey. She achieved mainstream success with her single "Riptide" from her first album Enchanted, which was featured as iTunes Single of the Week in October 2013 and had over 150,000 downloads. She describes her music as "sparkly folk pop".

== Early life and education ==
Born to parents Toby and Tina Stevens in Guildford in England, she has one younger sister, Ellen. Stevens grew up in Shalford just outside Guildford, where she lived until the age of 17. She attended Shalford First School, St Theresa's in Effingham and St Peter's in Merrow where she studied GCSE Music.

Stevens watched her mother play Spanish acoustic guitar at the age of two or three and made up "useless melodies". Spotting this early talent, her parents sent her to cello and piano lessons from the age of six. She later joined the Surrey Youth Orchestra. From the age of about 10, Stevens had orchestra and piano lessons at Charterhouse, and attended stage school at the Yvonne Arnaud Theatre in 1999. Her songwriting began around age 12 or 13 when she took up the guitar properly: "I'd write a lot of melodies on the piano then too. I started writing poetry as well – I got a poem published in a national competition – and I started combining them with melodies".

Stevens's first appearance on stage was at the age of 13 at a local venue in Guildford. "I was terrified but I remember loving being on stage and singing my songs as I do now".

From 2006 to 2007, Stevens attended the Academy of Contemporary Music and graduated with a diploma in Guitar and Contemporary Performance. This is also where she met her guitarist Sam Whiting.

== Early career ==
While still at ACM, Stevens and friend Charlotte "Charlie" Hewson formed Wildstar (described as "an acoustic/pop duo with a mix of harmony and mellow rock") with Hewson on lead vocals and Stevens on guitar and backing vocals. The duo played a combination of covers and original tracks including "Fine Day", "Looking For Love" and "Footprints". After graduating from ACM, Stevens worked as a session musician playing guitar and piano for groups such as Fin, H-Boogie and Ronit & The Aramingos. She met her first manager, Bob James, and started collaborating with writers across multiple genres. Her work included writing and performing on Britain's Got Talent finalist Andrew Muir's debut album (still unreleased); she co-wrote "Can't Say That It's Over", "Don't Let Me Go" and "You Don't Seem to Understand Me" for the album in 2009. Soon after, she wrote a song called "Wowowow" for Korean boy-band SHINee, which appeared on their second album Lucifer in 2010. The song sold 100,000 copies in its first week as a single.

Performing in the band Shooting Lead Rabbits (described as "a three-piece, retro, art house, alternative, folk rock band") led to a European tour in 2010 and a distribution deal with FNAC. The band's self-titled and only album release features Stevens on backing vocals on four of the tracks.

During songwriting sessions in Los Angeles with Charlie Midnight, with his encouragement, Stevens began to seriously consider a future solo career.

Other collaborations have included Sharon Vaughn, Eric Shermehorn, Andy Goldmark, Wayne Rodriguez, Mimoza Blinsson, Adam Kagan, Will Simms, Russ Ballard and John Beck.

In 2011, she toured with British rock band Fin, supporting Incubus, Mona, The Kooks and Feeder, regularly performing for crowds of 20,000.

== Solo career ==
=== 2012–2014: Enchanted ===
In early 2012, Stevens' mother was diagnosed with cancer. Along with Charlie Midnight, her mother had been strongly encouraging her to embark on a solo career – "she was my biggest supporter and believer in me and would say, ‘You’ve got the potential to do it yourself.’ So I thought, ‘Yeah, I’m going to do it!’".

Two weeks before her mother died on 26 March 2012, they sat down together and decided that the first album would be released initially as a series of four EPs. Tina Stevens designed the cover artwork that would be used, in four sections, for each of the EPs. Placed together, the four pieces form the entire cover of the full album, Enchanted.

Earlier, in November 2011, Stevens had started collaborating with songwriter/producer Pete Woodroffe (best known for his work with Def Leppard) who would eventually co-write 14 of the tracks and produce all four EPs and the album. In an interview in December 2013, she declared Woodroffe as her "Ultimate Hero".

In August 2012, Stevens was picked up by the BBC Introducing series for new and unsigned artists. On 19 August 2012 she performed four songs live on air with band members Sam Whiting, Belinda Webb and Emma Hughes.

The first single, "A Place Called You", was released on 28 October 2012 and received its first national airplay on BBC Radio 2's Weekend Wogan show on 2 September 2012. The single is one of her most successful songs, with over 3 million streams on Spotify.

Stevens toured extensively during the remainder of 2012, promoting the Heart on Hand EP.

In January 2013, she collaborated with English folk-rock singer-songwriter Passenger, which resulted in the song "I'll Be Your Man".

In early 2013, Terry Wogan continued to champion the Heart on Hand EP, culminating in a live appearance on Weekend Wogan on 17 March 2013, where Stevens performed the next single to be released, "Once". Also appearing on this show was American singer-songwriter Jenn Bostic, with whom she performed a live cover of Ed Sheeran's "Give Me Love". Stevens and Bostic would become firm friends and would tour together twice during 2013.

Soon after this appearance, "Once" was playlisted by BBC Radio 2 on 27 March 2013.

Following the success of "Once", the original single "A Place Called You" was re-released and was subsequently playlisted by BBC Radio 2 on 27 July 2013.

Further support came from BBC Radio 2 Breakfast presenter Chris Evans, resulting in a live appearance on the show on 16 August 2013, where Stevens performed "A Place Called You". During the show, Evans invited her to play at his Carfest festival in aid of the BBC Children in Need charity on 24 August 2013.

Another live appearance on BBC Radio 2 soon followed on 18 August 2013 when she performed "Sunflower" on Good Morning Sunday. The following month, Stevens headlined the BBC Introducing stage at Festival in a Day in Hyde Park on 8 September 2013.

Recording work on the debut album was completed on 9 September 2013, and growing success led to the accelerated release of the final two EPs. Sunflower, the final EP, was released on 20 October 2013 and contained the third single "Riptide" as well as the title track "Sunflower", the second of two songs Stevens wrote about coping with the loss of her mother. "When I wrote 'Sunflower' I came up with the title because my Mum used to grow Sunflowers at the bottom of the garden when I was a little girl, and I really felt the urge to use that and turn it into a lyric. It's one of the saddest songs I have written, but I just desperately needed to – it helped me in the grieving process after losing my Mum and it helps me every day when I sing it on stage".

"Riptide" and "Sunflower" were each written in less than a day. BBC Radio 2 again playlisted the new single on 28 September 2013, and further support followed from iTunes when the track became their Single of the Week in the UK, Ireland, Russia and India on 22 October 2013.

After the album was completed, rather than sign to a major label, Stevens decided to self-release Enchanted, and signed a deal with label services company Absolute Marketing and Distribution Ltd.

In January 2014, Stevens' manager announced that "Riptide" would be released via Go Entertainment in Benelux and Universal in Ireland. In the following month, the single was playlisted by Radio 2 and radiomol in Belgium and Radio 2 in the Netherlands.

=== 2014–2017: Waves and To My Roots ===
During 2014, Stevens again collaborated with co-writer and producer Pete Woodroffe on her second album, Waves. The first single from the new album, "Make My Day", was released in August 2014 and was, once again, playlisted by BBC Radio 2. Stevens performed the song live on Weekend Wogan on 7 September 2014.

Recording the album was completed on 15 August 2014 and Waves was subsequently released on 10 November 2014.

In August 2015, an expanded deluxe edition of Waves was released with new artwork and eight additional tracks (ten additional tracks were included on the limited edition CD digipack version). One of the new tracks, "Never Gonna Change", was released as a single in June 2015.

During the summer of 2015, Stevens spent a month in Nashville collaborating with musicians and songwriters as she prepared for her third studio album, To My Roots. This was to be her first self-produced album, and included songs co-written with Charlie Midnight, Pete Woodroffe and Buck Johnson. Musicians appearing on the album included Michael Spriggs, Bruce Bouton, Jonathan Yudkin and Miles Bould. A radio edit of "Sing Out (Hey La Hey Lo)", remixed by Ash Howes, was released as the first single from the album in June 2017 with a short headline tour to promote the album. To My Roots was released on 21 July 2017, followed by the second single, the title track from the album and another remix by Ash Howes, "To My Roots" in August 2017.

In April 2017, Stevens was invited to be a member of the UK national jury for the Eurovision Song Contest.

=== 2017–present: Christmas, Atoms, Light Year and Bloom ===
In November 2017, Christmas, a collection of four festive songs, was released digitally and as a limited edition CD EP. It included covers of "Stay Another Day", "Somewhere Only We Know" and the traditional carol "Silent Night", a collaboration with Nashville's Michael Spriggs.

Stevens' track "A Place Called You" became a streaming hit in China after being featured on Where Are We Going Dad? a Chinese reality TV show broadcast on Hunan Television attracting 75 million viewers. A new track, "The Cappuccino Song", was recorded in early 2019 and released (in China only) during April 2019 to coincide with Stevens' seven city tour of the country. The track was also included on the album A Place Called You, effectively a Greatest Hits compilation, released only in China.

During 2018, Stevens had collaborated with writers Charlie Midnight, Jessica Sharman and Kevin Jeremiah (from the band The Feeling) resulting in a five track EP entitled Atoms released 10 May 2019. The lead single, "Because It's You" is a duet with Kevin Jeremiah and also includes contributions from other The Feeling band members Ciaran Jeremiah (guitar) and Paul Stewart (drums). The title track from the EP, "Atoms", was subsequently remixed by Pete Woodroffe and released as the second single on 22 November 2019.

Stevens' fourth studio album, titled Light Year, was released on 30 April 2021. Its lead single, "Jump In", was released on 4 September 2020, and five additional singles were released before the album; "Forever", "The Rain Fell on Haikou", "Keep Dreaming", "On a Day Like Today" and "The Grass Is Always Greener".

Two further singles were released, "The Longing" was released on 29 October 2021 and "Love Revolution" was released on 3 June 2022. Both tracks mark a change to a heavier, more rock-orientated sound for the forthcoming album.

Further tracks from the forthcoming album, "Do You Think About Me?" and "Fragile" were released towards the end of 2022. After a break of over a year, two more tracks emerged, "Inside the Forest" and "Bloom" with the album itself (also entitled Bloom) finally released on 19 April 2024 with a remastered version of "The Longing" as its opening track.

== Personal life ==
Stevens still lives in the Guildford area.

Other than her music, her greatest passions are animal welfare, tennis, surfing and the sea. In 2023, Stevens visited Sri Lanka, volunteering to help protect sea turtles and street dogs. She is also a supporter of the Joanna Wildlife Hospital in Guildford. Stevens married her long-term boyfriend Sam Rommer at Croyde Bay in July 2022.

== Discography ==
=== EPs ===
- Heart on Hand (2012)
- Dreaming Trees (2013)
- Underwater (2013)
- Sunflower (2013)
- Christmas (2017)
- Atoms (2019)

=== Albums ===
- Enchanted (2013)
- Waves (2014)
- Waves (Deluxe Edition) (2015)
- To My Roots (2017)
- Light Year (2021)

=== Singles ===
- "A Place Called You" (October 2012)
- "Once" (March 2013)
- "Riptide" (October 2013)
- "Make My Day" (August 2014)
- "Gold Rush" (November 2014)
- "Never Gonna Change" (June 2015)
- "Sing Out (Hey La Hey Lo)" (June 2017)
- "To My Roots" (August 2017)
- "Because It's You" (May 2019)
- "Atoms" (November 2019)
- "Jump In" (September 2020)
- "Forever" (October 2020)
- "The Rain Fell on Haikou" (November 2020)
- "Keep Dreaming" (December 2020)
- "On a Day Like Today" (January 2021)
- "The Grass Is Always Greener" (February 2021)
- "The Longing" (October 2021)
- "Love Revolution" (June 2022)

== Notable television and radio live performances ==
- BBC Introducing Session (BBC Radio Surrey, 19 August 2012)
- The Late Show (BBC London, 30 September 2012)
- Weekend Wogan (BBC Radio 2, 17 March 2013)
- Danny Pike Show (BBC Sussex, 15 June 2013)
- Breakfast with Spencer Howson (ABC Radio Brisbane, 15 August 2013)
- Chris Evans Breakfast Show (BBC Radio 2, 16 August 2013)
- Good Morning Sunday (BBC Radio 2, 18 August 2013)
- Festival in a Day (BBC TV, 8 September 2013)
- Spencer Howson Christmas Show (ABC Radio Brisbane, 13 December 2013)
- The Janice Long Review Show (Vintage TV, 26 January 2014)
- The Janice Forsyth Show (BBC Radio Scotland, 7 April 2014)
- The Late Late Show (RTÉ, 16 May 2014)
- Langs de Lijn En Omstreken (NPO Radio 1, 17 May 2014)
- Muziekcafé (Radio 2 (Netherlands), 17 May 2014)
- Weekend Wogan (BBC Radio 2, 7 September 2014)
- GI:EL (NPO 3FM, 19 September 2014)
- Sound for Sight (BBC Radio 2, 8 October 2014)
- BBC South Today Children in Need (BBC South Today, 14 November 2014)
- The Janice Forsyth Show (BBC Radio Scotland, 23 April 2015)
- Chris Evans Breakfast Show (BBC Radio 2, 30 July 2015)
- BBC South Today Children in Need (BBC South Today, 6 November 2015)
- Brooklands Country with Alex Nairn (Brooklands Radio, 23 May 2016)
- Chongqing Music Interview and Sessions (Chongqing Music Radio, 22 April 2019)
- BBC South Today Evening News (BBC South Today, 1 May 2019)

== Solo tours ==
Stevens embarked on the Heart on Hand Tour following the release of her first EP.

Heart on Hand Tour
Date	City	Venue
5 September 2012	Islington	Old Queen's Head
8 September 2012	Kettering	Grendon Festival
27 September 2012	London	The Corner Shop
11 October 2012	Bolton	The Railway Music Venue
12 October 2012	Liverpool	Mello Mello
17 October 2012	London	The George & Vulture
26 October 2012	Matlock Bath	The Fishpond
2 November 2012	Llandudno	The Parade
3 November 2012	Chester	Crown & Liver
15 November 2012	Hove	The Brunswick
23 November 2012	Hartlepool	The Studio
27 November 2012	Milton Keynes	The Stables

During February 2013, Stevens supported Jenn Bostic on her first UK tour.

Supporting Jenn Bostic
Date	City	Venue
19 February 2013	London	Half Moon
21 February 2013	Birmingham	The Bull's Head
25 February 2013	Manchester	Band on the Wall
26 February 2013	Nottingham	The Maze
27 February 2013	Cardiff	10 Feet Tall
5 March 2013	London	The Social

The Dreaming Trees Tour promoted EP number two, the first to be released in 2013.

Dreaming Trees Tour
Date	City	Venue
6 March 2013	Guildford	Bar Des Arts
9 March 2013	Guildford	Boileroom
29 March 2013	York	The Basement
31 March 2013	Inverness	Hootananny
3 April 2013	Guildford	Bar Des Arts
17 April 2013	Cambridge	The Junction
18 April 2013	London	Surya
19 April 2013	Matlock Bath	The Fishpond
23 April 2013	Southsea	The Cellars
28 April 2013	Milton Keynes	The Stables
3 May 2013	York	Fibbers
13 May 2013	London	Dublin Castle
15 May 2013	Cardiff	10 Feet Tall
17 May 2013	Brighton	The Great Escape
19 May 2013	Manchester	Blue Cat Cafe
20 May 2013	Liverpool	International Pop Festival
21 May 2013	Worthing	Bar 42
22 May 2013	Sheffield	The Green Room
25 May 2013	London	International Pop Festival
26 May 2013	London	The Stag

During September and October 2013, Stevens supported British singer-songwriter Sam Gray on his UK tour.

Supporting Sam Gray
Date	City	Venue
24 September 2013	York	Fibbers
26 September 2013	Sheffield	The Greystones
30 September 2013	Bristol	Colston2
3 October 2013	Norwich	Waterfront
4 October 2013	Birmingham	The Institute
5 October 2013	Nottingham	Bodega
6 October 2013	Brighton	Komedia
7 October 2013	London	The Borderline
10 October 2013	Eastney	The Cellars
11 October 2013	Manchester	Sound Control

During November and December 2013, Stevens once again joined Jenn Bostic on her second UK tour.

Supporting Jenn Bostic – The Jealous Tour
Date	City	Venue
26 November 2013	London	The Borderline
27 November 2013	Southampton	The Chapel Sessions
29 November 2013	Bristol	Bristol Folk House
30 November 2013	Totnes	South Devon Arts Centre
2 December 2013	Glasgow	Broadcast
3 December 2013	York	Fibbers
4 December 2013	Sheffield	The Greystones
5 December 2013	Manchester	The Deaf Institute
8 December 2013	Hull	Fruit
10 December 2013	Norwich	Norwich Arts Centre

In March 2014, Stevens embarked on the Enchanted Tour, a national headline tour accompanied by her full band: Sam Whiting on guitar, Pete Snowdon on bass and James Rees-Flynn on drums.

The Enchanted Tour
Date	City	Venue
26 March 2014	Cambridge	Portland Arms
28 March 2014	Guildford	Boileroom
1 April 2014	Sheffield	The Greystones
2 April 2014	Wolverhampton	Robin 2
3 April 2014	York	Fibbers
4 April 2014	London	The Borderline
5 April 2014	Manchester	Sound Control
11 April 2014	Bristol	Louisiana
12 April 2014	Totnes	South Devon Arts Centre
15 April 2014	Newcastle	Cluny
16 April 2014	Runcorn	The Brindley
17 April 2014	Nottingham	Maze
18 April 2014	Glasgow	Broadcast
19 April 2014	Liverpool	Zanzibar
24 April 2014	Blackburn	Middle Earth Festival
1 May 2014	Southampton	The Brook
31 May 2014	Uttoxeter	Acoustic Festival

Beginning in April 2015, Stevens embarked on the Waves Tour, a national tour co-headlining with Blair Dunlop. Band members for the tour included Sam Whiting on guitar, Simon "Spud" Smith on bass and keys and James Rees-Flynn on drums.

The Waves Tour
Date	City	Venue
15 April 2015	Southampton	Chapel Sessions
18 April 2015	London	Bush Hall
19 April 2015	Marnhull	Pebble Sessions
22 April 2015	Manchester	The Deaf Institute
23 April 2015	Edinburgh	Caves
25 April 2015	York	Fibbers
28 April 2015	Lincoln	The Platform
29 April 2015	Birmingham	Glee
30 April 2015	Nottingham	Glee
1 May 2015	Bristol	Colston Hall
2 May 2015	Hull	Fruit

In June 2017, Stevens embarked on the to My Roots Tour, a full band national tour to promote her third studio album, with musicians Stu Wilkinson (Mandolin), Sam Rommer (Bass), Sam Whiting (Guitar) and Tom O. Mitchell (Drums & Percussion).

The to My Roots Tour
Date	City	Venue
1 June 2017	Guildford	Boileroom
2 June 2017	London	The Slaughtered Lamb
3 June 2017	Bristol	Louisiana
7 June 2017	Southampton	Chapel Sessions
9 June 2017	Manchester	Castle Hotel
10 June 2017	Stockton	Arc
11 June 2017	Sheffield	The Greystones
12 June 2017	Wolverhampton	Robin 2
13 June 2017	Glasgow	Hug and Pint
14 June 2017	Leicester	The Musician
23 June 2017	Totnes	Unit 23

In May and June 2018, Stevens embarked on the to My Roots Spring Tour, this time as a trio along with Stu Wilkinson (Mandolin) & Sam Rommer (Bass).

The to My Roots Spring Tour
Date	City	Venue
5 May 2018	Guildford	Boileroom
6 May 2018	Leicester	The Musician
17 May 2018	Sheffield	Greystones
18 May 2018	London	The Slaughtered Lamb
19 May 2018	Bristol	The Louisiana
28 May 2018	Manchester	Castle Hotel
29 May 2018	Wolverhampton	Robin 2
1 June 2018	Newbury	Arlington Arts Centre
3 June 2018	Southampton	The Brook
12 June 2018	Milton Keynes	The Stables 2
16 June 2018	Sittingbourne	The Dancing Dog

In April 2019, Stevens embarked on her first tour of mainland China.

The A Place Called You China Tour
Date	City	Venue
12 April 2019	Dongguan	Mati Music
13 April 2019	Haikou	Daqian Music Concert Hall
14 April 2019	Yinchuan	Gunshi Music
18 April 2019	Taiyuan	Zhangli Yun Lounge
19 April 2019	Zhengzhou	Henan University
20 April 2019	Pingdingshan	Hawaii Holiday Inn
21 April 2019	Chongqing	Dongni Music

In May 2019, Stevens embarked on the Atoms Tour promoting her Atoms EP.

The Atoms Tour
Date	City	Venue
9 May 2019	Bath	Chapel Arts Centre
10 May 2019	London	The Victoria Dalston
12 May 2019	Cardiff	Acapela Studio
13 May 2019	Leicester	The Musician
15 May 2019	Southampton	Chapel Sessions
16 May 2019	Birmingham	Kitchen Garden Cafe
17 May 2019	Milton Keynes	The Stables 2
18 May 2019	Horsham	The Rec Rooms
20 May 2019	Sheffield	Greystones
21 May 2019	Manchester	Gullivers
22 May 2019	Glasgow	The Hug and Pint
