= Weekend Wogan =

BBC radio show

- Genre: Talk, music
- Running time: 120 minutes
- Country of origin: United Kingdom
- Language: English
- Home station: BBC Radio 2
- Starring: Terry Wogan; Alan Dedicoat (2010–12); John Marsh (2010); Elio Pace (2010)
- Produced by: Alan Boyd; Anthony Cherry; Ste Softley; David Manero
- Recording studio: BBC Radio Theatre (2010) Western House, London (2011–2015)
- Original release: 14 February 2010 – 8 November 2015
- No. of series: 4
- Audio format: Stereo
- Website: Official Website
- Podcast: Official Podcast

Weekend Wogan is the incarnation of the Sunday morning show on BBC Radio 2 from 14 February 2010 to 8 November 2015. The show was presented by Terry Wogan, which marked his return to Radio 2 following his departure as presenter of the weekday breakfast show in December 2009.

In its first year, the show was broadcast in front of a live audience in the BBC Radio Theatre, before moving to Western House, Radio 2's headquarters, where it remained until the end of its run.

Wogan hosted the show for the final time on Remembrance Sunday 2015, as his health was beginning to decline due to cancer. He died from this illness on 31 January 2016. The show's slot was filled with guest hosts until 29 November 2015 after which regular cover show Madeley on Sunday, presented by Richard Madeley, took over the slot temporarily, until it was initially assumed that Wogan would return. Michael Ball took over the slot on a permanent basis from April 2016, returning to the show he vacated in 2010 to allow Wogan to present.

The programme featured guests and live music from BBC Radio 2's studios at Western House in London. It was broadcast for approximately forty Sundays a year, with the remaining twelve being taken by an interim show, which from May 2012 was Madeley on Sunday. Previously, until September 2011, the interim show was Michael Ball's Sunday Brunch.

== History ==
Wogan confirmed on 7 September 2009 that he would be leaving the breakfast show at the end of the year, with Chris Evans replacing him. He presented his final edition of Wake Up to Wogan on 18 December 2009, although by then it had been announced that Wogan would return to Radio 2 from 14 February 2010 to host a live weekly two-hour Sunday show, featuring live musical performance and guests, between 11:00 and 13:00.

The three 2010 series were broadcast in front of a live audience in the Radio Theatre at Broadcasting House and had an original run of three months. Tickets for the first block of twelve shows sold out within 24 hours. Wogan's first guests on his new show were actor Ian McKellen and jazz singers Norah Jones and Jamie Cullum. In its first year, the programme also featured a house band, led by musician Elio Pace.

In 2011, the televised version was cancelled, and Weekend Wogan was hosted from BBC Radio 2's studios in Western House.

On 3 July 2012, the BBC Trust ruled that Wogan had breached broadcasting guidelines following the 22 January edition, in which he made comments that appeared to make light of the Costa Concordia disaster, which had occurred nine days earlier. After playing "Rock the Boat" by The Hues Corporation, Wogan questioned whether it was an appropriate choice of song and joked about the Costa Concordia's captain. The ship ran aground and partially sank off the Italian coast with the loss of 33 lives.

== Show format ==
Airing from 11 am to 1 pm every Sunday, Weekend Wogan featured a mix of live and recorded music, together with guest singers. The show also included celebrity interviews, as well as contributions from Wogan's listeners and regular guests such as, in its first year, the newsreader John Marsh. Features of the show included parodies of the Janet and John stories, featuring Marsh, and which were a regular mainstay of Wake Up to Wogan. A podcast of the show was available online.

Wogan usually signed off the show saying "well, that's about the height of it" before thanking his guests and producers, previewing next week's show and playing his last record.

Throughout 2010 the show was also televised. Wogan was joined on stage by an eleven-piece house band led by musical director Elio Pace with backing vocals from Kirstie Roberts, Sue Acteson and Chloe Buswell. Video highlights of Weekend Wogan could also be viewed on the show's website from Mondays and on the Red Button.

== Televised episodes ==
=== Series 1 ===
No.	Guests	Original release date
1	Ian McKellen, Jamie Cullum and Norah Jones	14 February 2010
2	Andrew Lloyd Webber, David Gray and Sharleen Spiteri	21 February 2010
3	Peter Alliss, Neil Sedaka, Beth Nielsen Chapman and John Barrowman	28 February 2010
4	Carly Simon, Craig David and Jonathan Pryce	7 March 2010
5	June Whitfield, Beverley Knight and Paul Carrack	14 March 2010
6	Natalie Imbruglia, Mick Hucknall and Griff Rhys Jones	21 March 2010
7	Timothy B. Schmit, Albert Lee and Sheila Hancock	28 March 2010
8	Elkie Brooks, Mica Paris and Debbie Reynolds	4 April 2010
9	Ringo Starr, Mika and Nell Bryden	11 April 2010
10	Ricky Gervais, Don McLean and Scouting for Girls	18 April 2010
11	Graham Norton, Billy Ocean, Richard Briers and Red Hurley	25 April 2010
12	Katie Melua, Glen Campbell and Justin Lee Collins	2 May 2010

=== Series 2 ===
No.	Guests	Original release date
1	Jeff Goldblum, Nerina Pallot and Des O'Connor	13 June 2010
2	Ronnie Corbett, Sandi Thom and Ben Montague	20 June 2010
3	Tony Hadley, Jodie Prenger and Rick Astley	27 June 2010
4	Maureen Lipman, Brian Kennedy and The Real Thing	4 July 2010
5	Bernard Cribbins, Gabriella Cilmi and Jon Allen	11 July 2010
6	Esther Rantzen, Richard Hawley and Joe Longthorne	18 July 2010
7	Tony Christie, Gretchen Peters and Kiri Te Kanawa	25 July 2010
8	Richard Wilson, Marti Pellow and Paloma Faith	1 August 2010
9	Sharon Corr, Ben's Brother, Leon Russell, and James Martin	8 August 2010
10	Brian May, Kerry Ellis, Fyfe Dangerfield and Robert Lindsay	15 August 2010
11	Kiki Dee and Incognito	22 August 2010

=== Series 3 ===
No.	Guests	Original release date
1	A special show live from the London Palladium for Children in Need. Guests Included Status Quo, JLS, KT Tunstall, Beverley Knight, Imelda May, Ben Montague, Jimmy Tarbuck, Andrew Lloyd Webber and Danielle Hope	3 October 2010
2	Chris De Burgh, John Legend and Sandie Shaw	10 October 2010
3	The Hoosiers, Huey Lewis, Tift Merritt and Joshua Radin	17 October 2010
4	Judie Tzuke, Ruthie Henshall and Seth Lakeman	24 October 2010
5	Lulu, Mary Chapin Carpenter and Roy Hudd	31 October 2010
6	Westlife, Raul Malo and Thea Gilmore live from BBC Maida Vale Studios	7 November 2010
7	Money can't buy auction in aid of children in need live from the Radio 2 Studio	14 November 2010
8	The Script, Charlotte Church and Elaine Paige from BBC Maida Vale Studios	21 November 2010
9	Russell Watson, Brenda Edwards, Richard Craker and OMD	28 November 2010
10	Katherine Jenkins, Patrick Stewart and Chelsea Pensioners	5 December 2010
11	Josh Groban, Rumer and Great British Barbershop Boys	12 December 2010
12	Gilbert O'Sullivan, Nell Bryden and Jimmy Carr	19 December 2010
