= Love Always (Shane Filan album) =

- Standard edition cover; deluxe edition cover features the title in gold text with "deluxe edition" on the bottom left.

Studio album by Shane Filan
- Released: 25 August 2017
- Recorded: 2016–2017
- Studios: Metrophonic Studios; (London, UK)
- Genre: Pop
- Length: 44:39
- Labels: Ocean Wave; Absolute
- Producers: Rawling Meehan; Paul Meehan; Brian Rawling; Paul Barry

Shane Filan chronology
Right Here (2015)	Love Always (2017)

Singles from Love Always
- 1. "Unbreakable" Released: 21 July 2017; 2. "Back to You" Released: 6 April 2018; 3. "Beautiful in White" Released: 6 July 2018

Professional ratings
Review scores
Source	Rating
Renowned for Sound	5/5 stars

Love Always is the third solo album by Irish singer-songwriter Shane Filan, as a follow-up to Right Here (2015), through Ocean Wave Records. It was released worldwide on 25 August 2017, with a release in Asia following on 15 September. The deluxe edition was released on 4 May 2018. The album features Filan's favorite all-time love ballads, such as the Bangles' "Eternal Flame", Bob Dylan's "Make You Feel My Love" and Bryan Adams' "Heaven", along with some fans suggestions. He also wrote three original songs, in collaboration with Paul Barry and Patrick Mascall, who previously worked together on his debut album You and Me.

The album peaked at number three in Scotland, and number five in Ireland and United Kingdom, making it Filan's highest charting solo album in UK. The album's lead single, Jamie Scott's "Unbreakable" was released on 21 July 2017, along with the music video. Followed by its second single "Back to You" for the release of the deluxe edition of the album on 4 May 2018 in the UK and Ireland. Third single, "Beautiful in White", was released on 6 July 2018 in the promotion of release of Love Always: Asia Deluxe Edition which was first released on Spotify on the same day.

== Background and recording ==
On 3 February 2017, Filan posted a picture on his Instagram account that he was recording for his third album. Recording sessions for the album took place in Metrophonic Studios in London. On 9 February, he asked his fans on Twitter to pick their favorite love songs to be added to the album and have their names in the album credits. On 7 April, he posted a picture that he finished recording the album.

The album contained both original material and mostly covers of famous love songs. In an interview with Shropshire Star, Filan stated "This new album is full of songs people already know – 75 per cent of them are famous songs and there's new original songs as well. There's a good mix of different styles of ballads. The famous songs, I wanted to do my version of them." He also said that the album took a few months to put together and though he already finished recording the album, he may still have one more song to record before it is released. The album is expected to be released in summer 2017.

In an interview with The List, he stated "This is an album I have been wanting to make for a long time, I love singing ballads and this album is full of some of my all-time favourite songs as well as some fan choices such as the Bangles hit "Eternal Flame" which I had never thought about covering but loved recording, to one of my own personal favourites Bryan Adams' "Heaven"."

On 28 June, during a Q&A session on his Facebook and Instagram account, he stated that the album took him six, seven months to finish recording, longer than his previous album. He also revealed three original songs featured in the album, "Crazy Over You", "Eyes Don't Lie" and "Completely", in collaboration with Paul Barry and Patrick Mascall, who also co-wrote songs from Filan's debut album You and Me.

On 5 July, he reportedly signed to Absolute, which provides label services including distribution, marketing and project management. Fraser Earley, senior label manager of Absolute and also a coordinator for the album release stated, "We’re delighted that Shane has turned to Absolute to support his latest solo record. He's had a phenomenal career, both with Westlife and as a solo star, and remains as ambitious as ever. With a large, loyal fanbase always eager to hear more from Shane, he's in a position to do things on his own terms. It’s a privilege to power his independence and continued solo success."

On 20 August, Filan talked about the production of the love songs covers album during a Q&A session. He and Louis Walsh had been talking about recording an album of love songs for few years and he felt it was the right time to do it. He also stated that he may consider to do another love songs album in the future.

== Release ==
On 7 May 2017, Filan announced the title of the album and the tour dates through his Twitter account. He also released *NSYNC's "This I Promise You", one of the tracks from the album through his YouTube account. On 28 June, the official cover was revealed, along with the track list, and the album could be pre-ordered starting 29 June, except in Asia. Richard Marx responded to a fan about the recorded single: "Yeah really nice." and to Filan: "You did my song proud, mate. Hope to run into each other somewhere. Cheers and thanks. RM" on their official Twitter accounts. It was later announced that the album will be released in Asia on 15 September through iTunes, Spotify and other platforms.

The song "Beautiful in White" is a new recording of an unreleased solo song by Filan which was leaked onto the Internet in April 2010. Upon its leak, the song was incorrectly credited as being recorded by Shayne Ward instead of Filan.

He sang "Swear It Again" and his versions of "Unbreakable" and "I Can't Make You Love Me" on BBC Radio 2 that made it on the track listing of the BBC Radio 2: The Piano Room album. "Heaven" and "Eternal Flame" were sung in a Radio 2 Session the next day.

=== Singles ===
On 21 July, Filan released Jamie Scott's "Unbreakable" as the lead single, along with the music video. The song was taken from Scott's album My Hurricane and was written by himself. Filan said that his manager, Louis Walsh holds a strong influence on his decision to record "Unbreakable". He stated: "Louis played me "Unbreakable" almost three years ago and he said this is such a hit song, sometimes Louis can ramble on about a song and eventually you realise he's right and he's going on about this song for a reason, he went on about "You Raise Me Up" for a long time before we agreed to do it in Westlife and look what happened there!” The music video was filmed on location in Blackwater, Wexford in Ireland and on Brittas Bay beach, located in County Wicklow, Ireland. The video was directed by Jonathan Lambert. Filan's nephew and his real life girlfriend were also featured in the video.

Crowded House's "Don't Dream It's Over" was expected to be the second single but its release was cancelled. Instead, "Back to You" was released for promotion of the deluxe edition of the album on 4 May 2018 in the UK and Ireland.

The third single, "Beautiful in White", was released on 6 July 2018 for the promotion of release of Love Always: Asia Deluxe Edition.

=== Promotional singles ===
"Heaven" was released as a promotional single from Love Always on 29 June 2017. In Asia, Filan released on Spotify a new version of "Need You Now" released as an EP with Filipino bossa nova artist Sitti on 9 February 2018. Sitti said "Neil Gregorio, MCA's Senior Domestic Label Manager, sent me a text last Jan 12 informing me of the collaboration and the intended schedule for vocal recording." Filan added when he met her, that she is "a great singer" and that she sounds "exactly like the recording".

== Track listing ==
Love Always – Standard edition
No.	Title	Writer(s)	Producer(s)	Length
1.	"This I Promise You" (original by *NSYNC)	Richard Marx	Rawling Meehan	3:55
2.	"Don't Dream It's Over" (original by Crowded House)	Neil Finn	Paul Meehan	3:45
3.	"Make You Feel My Love" (original by Bob Dylan)	Bob Dylan	P. Meehan	3:32
4.	"Beautiful in White"	Savan Kotecha; Arnthor Birgisson	R. Meehan	3:52
5.	"Need You Now" (original by Lady Antebellum)	Hillary Scott; Charles Kelley; Dave Haywood; Josh Kear	R. Meehan	3:55
6.	"Heaven" (original by Bryan Adams)	Bryan Adams; Jim Vallance	P. Meehan	4:01
7.	"Completely"	Shane Filan; Paul Barry; Patrick Mascall	P. Meehan; Barry	3:36
8.	"Unbreakable" (original by Jamie Scott)	Jamie Scott	R. Meehan	3:49
9.	"Eyes Don't Lie"	Filan; Barry; Mascall	P. Meehan; Barry	3:40
10.	"I Can't Make You Love Me" (original by Bonnie Raitt)	Mike Reid; Allen Shamblin	P. Meehan; Brian Rawling	4:13
11.	"Crazy Over You"	Filan; Barry; Mascall	P. Meehan	3:11
12.	"Eternal Flame" (original by the Bangles)	Susanna Hoffs; Tom Kelly; Billy Steinberg	P. Meehan	3:09
Total length:				44:39

Love Always – Deluxe edition
No.	Title	Writer(s)	Length
13.	"Need You Now (featuring Anggun)"	H. Scott; Kelley; Haywood; Kear	3:55
14.	"Back to You"	Filan; Ed Drewett; Pete Hammerton	3:31
15.	"Girl in My Heart"	Filan; Fiona Bevan; Jonathan Quarmby	3:59
16.	"Heaven" (live in Glasgow)	Adams; Vallance	4:03
17.	"I Can't Make You Love Me" (live in London)	Reid; Shamblin	4:17
18.	"This I Promise You" (live in Belfast)	Marx	4:00
19.	"You Raise Me Up" (live in Dublin)	Brendan Graham; Rolf Løvland	4:57
Total length:			73:14

Love Always – Asia deluxe edition
No.	Title	Writer(s)	Length
16.	"Need You Now (featuring Sitti)"	Scott, Kelley, Haywood, Kear	3:55
17.	"Heaven" (live)	Adams, Vallance	4:03
18.	"I Can't Make You Love Me" (live)	Reid, Shamblin	4:17
19.	"This I Promise You" (live)	Marx	4:00
20.	"You Raise Me Up" (live)	Graham, Løvland	4:57
Total length:			77:14

== Personnel ==
Credits are adapted from liner notes.

- Shane Filan – lead vocals
- Rawling Meehan – producer, mixing
- Paul Meehan – keyboard, producer, mixing, programming, guitar, cello, strings
- Paul Barry – guitar, piano, producer
- Patrick Mascall – guitar
- Brian Rawling – drums, producer
- Adam Phillips – guitar
- Matt Furmidge – mixing
- Dom Liu – cello
- Jamie Scott – background vocals, piano (track 8)
- Lili Forberg – photography
- Tony Stott – photography

== Charts ==
Chart (2017–2018)	Peak position
Indonesian Albums	1
Irish Albums (IRMA)	5
Philippine Albums	1
Scottish Albums (Official Charts)	3
UK Albums (Official Charts)	5
UK Independent Albums (Official Charts)	3

== Release history ==
Region	Date	Format(s)	Edition(s)	Label	Ref.
United Kingdom	25 August 2017	CD; digital download	Standard	Ocean Wave	
Various	1 September 2017	CD	Standard	Ocean Wave	
Asia	15 September 2017	Streaming	Standard	Ocean Wave; Universal Music	
