= Me and the Moon =

Me and the Moon may refer to:

- "Me and the Moon", a single from the album Right Here by Shane Filan (2015)
- "Me and the Moon", a track on the debut album The Drums by The Drums (2010)
