= Beautiful in White =

Song by Shane Filan

from the album Love Always
- Recorded: 2006 (demo); 2017
- Studio: Abbey Road (London; demo)
- Genre: Pop
- Length: 3:52
- Label: Ocean Wave; Absolute
- Songwriters: Savan Kotecha; Arnthor Birgisson
- Producer: Rawling Meehan

Music video
- "Beautiful in White" on YouTube

"Beautiful in White" is a song recorded by Irish singer-songwriter Shane Filan from his third studio album, Love Always (2017). The track was originally written by Savan Kotecha and Arnthor Birgisson for a then-upcoming album of Filan's band, Westlife. After it was rejected, Filan's 2006 demo of the track surfaced online in 2010 and gained much success in Asia where it was a popular wedding song and making it as one of their sleeper hits. The singer eventually acknowledged the song's popularity four years later, and in 2017, he re-recorded the song for Love Always. In addition to including it on the Love Always Tour (2017–18) setlist, Filan also performed "Beautiful in White" on two television series, Rising Star Indonesia and Immortal Songs: Singing the Legend. Its music video was later released in July 2018.

== Background and composition ==
"Beautiful in White" is a song written by Savan Kotecha and Arnthor Birgisson. At Kotecha's request, Filan recorded a demo of the song sometime around 2006. The session took place at the Abbey Road Studios, and "Beautiful in White" was his only track recorded there. When the demo was leaked in 2010, it quickly received positive reaction from Westlife's fan base and its Asian audience.

Pachelbel's Canon
Arrangement for violins, harps and bass by Kevin MacLeod, 2006

Due to the great reception whenever he performed the song live, Filan later re-recorded "Beautiful in White" for his third studio album Love Always (2017), with a new production handled by Rawling Meehan. The album contained both original material and cover versions of famous love songs; "Beautiful in White" was among the original ones. According to the news website VnExpress, the track was written based on Johann Pachelbel's "Canon", which has also been a popular wedding song. It was composed in the traditional verse–chorus form in C major, with Filan's vocal ranging from the chords of E_{4} to B_{5}. The track's lyrics describes the speaker's feelings when he first met his bride wearing a wedding dress. Prior to this release, the demo was often incorrectly credited as being recorded by Shayne Ward instead of Filan.

== Live performances and music video ==
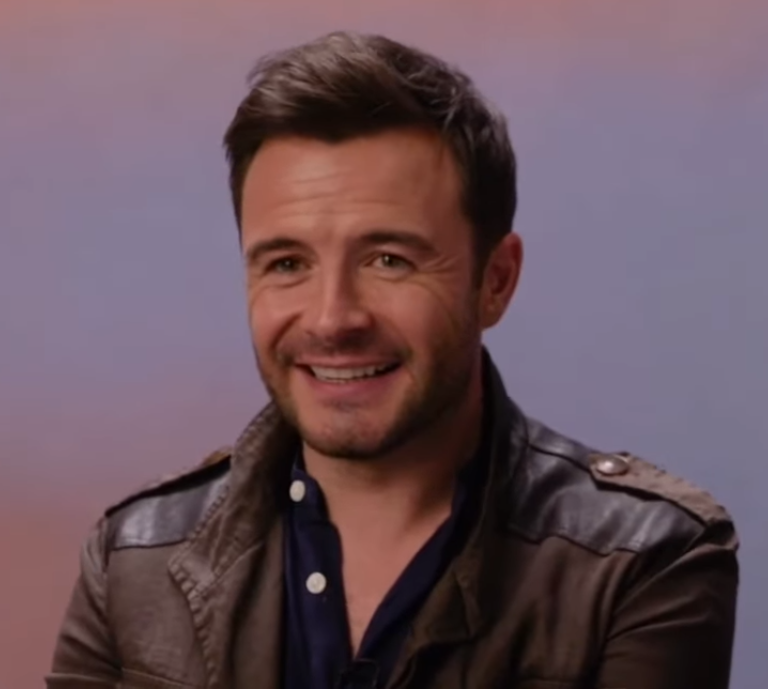
Filan in 2021

On 13 March 2017, Filan performed "My Love" and "Beautiful in White" while appearing on an episode of Rising Star Indonesia's season 2. On 19 May 2018, the singer performed "Beautiful in White" on the Korean competition show Immortal Songs: Singing the Legend. The theme of that week's episode had its contestants performing his and Westlife's music; Filan was invited to appear as a guest judge. Later on 8 July of that same year, he sang the song during the private wedding ceremony of Chryseis Tan and Faliq Nasimuddin, who are the heirs to two top Malaysian companies, Berjaya Corporation and Naza, respectively. Members of the English band Blue was another act that performed at the event. "Beautiful in White" was also included on the setlist for Filan's Love Always Tour (2017–18).

Jonathan Lambert, who had previously directed Filan's music video for "Unbreakable", also directed "Beautiful in White". The video was released on Filan's 39th birthday, 5 July 2018, via his Vevo account. On the day before, he tweeted about its release and posted a behind the scenes clip from the shoot on Instagram. Shot entirely in black and white, the video features a young couple (the male lead portrayed by Filan's nephew and godson, Killian Filan) getting married. Interspersed with the narrative are scenes of Filan performing the song at the D-Light Studios in Dublin, Ireland. The singer wanted to create "something classy and timeless," so as a result, the final product was a "performance-based" video. "[It] is very simple and elegant," he added.

In 2024, they exclusively included the song on Filan's group Westlife setlist on their fifteenth concert tour, With Love Tour.

== Credits ==
Credits adapted from the liner notes of Love Always.

- Savan Kotecha – writing
- Arnthor Birgisson – writing
- Rawling Meehan – production
- Paul Meehan – mixing, keyboards, programming
- Adam Phillips – guitar
- Brian Rawling – drums

== Charts ==
Chart (2017)	Peak position
Philippines (Philippine Hot 100)	51
