= Cut Out and Keep =

Cut Out And Keep

Studio album by Farrah
- Released: 2007
- Recorded: 2006
- Genre: Indie; Powerpop; Rock
- Length: 36:16
- Label: Lojinx (UK); Egging (Japan); Rock Indiana (Spain)
- Producer: Just A Noise

Farrah chronology
Me Too (album) (2004)	Cut Out And Keep (2007)

Cut Out And Keep is a 2007 album from UK band Farrah.

== Track listing ==
1. Dumb Dumb Ditty
2. Do You Ever Think Of Me
3. Awkward Situation
4. No Reason Why
5. As Soon As I Get Over You
6. Fear Of Flying
7. School Reunion
8. The Things We Shouldn't Say
9. No-one Stays Together
10. The Only Way
11. Removal Man
12. Wristband Generation (Japanese Version only)
13. Lonely Boy (Japanese Version only)

== Notes ==
- Lonely Boy is a cover version of the song originally written and performed by Andrew Gold.
