= Farrah (band) =

British indie rock band

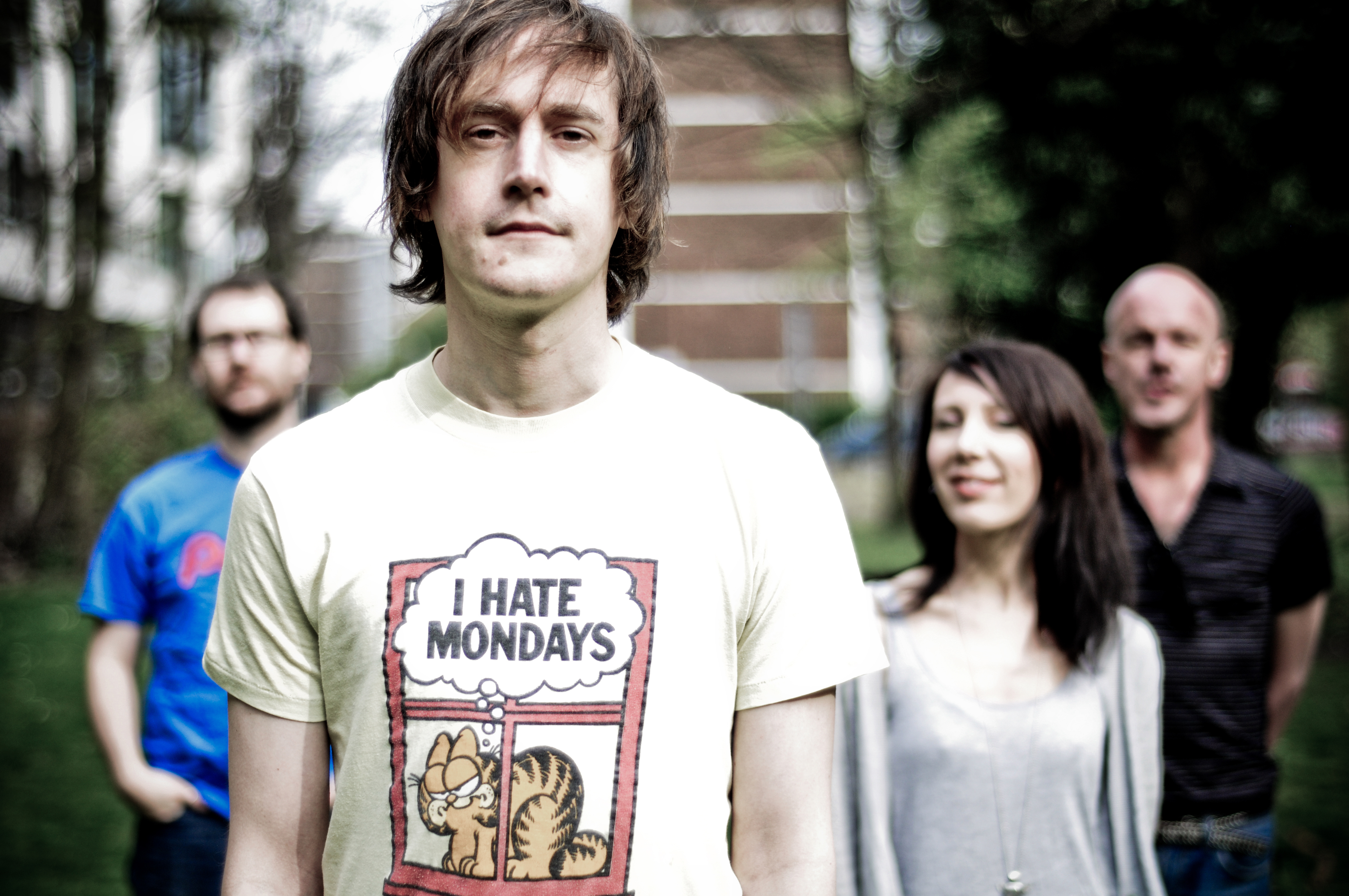
- Farrah in 2009

Background information
- Origin: London, England, United Kingdom
- Genres: Indie rock, power pop
- Years active: 1999–present
- Labels: Lojinx; Egging; Ark 21; Rock Indiana; Polaris Records/MVS; Fabtone
- Members: Jez Ashurst; Andrew Campbell; Henrik Irgens; Dana Myzer
- Past members: Mike Hopkins; Tom Marsh; Max Fidani; Mike Walker; Michelle Margherita
- Website: farrah.co.uk

Farrah are a British indie rock band. They have released four studio albums since 2001 and toured internationally since their formation.

== History ==
After releasing their debut single "Terry" on the indie Noisebox Records label in the UK they were signed to The Police manager Miles Copeland III's Ark 21 Records for the release of their debut album, Moustache. The album was released in the UK, US, Europe and Japan and saw the band tour the world extensively to support it. When Ark21 shut down operation in the UK, their second album Me Too, was released on various independent labels throughout the world.

Farrah have maintained their independent status ever since. Recording at their own South London recording studio, producing their own videos and managing their online presence.

In late 2006, Farrah completed their third album, Cut Out and Keep. It was released in 2007 in the UK, Spain and Japan and accompanied by a world tour.

In early 2007, Farrah began working with the Japanese pop rock artist Kaela Kimura. They composed two songs for her, and she covered their song, "No Reason Why". One of Japan's leading rock bands, Asian Kung-Fu Generation invited Farrah to appear at the Nano-Mugen Festival on two occasions.

In 2009, they released their self-titled fourth album in Japan with former Cotton Mather drummer Dana Myzer in its lineup. The album, with a slightly different track listing, was released in the rest of the world in May 2010.

Farrah's cover of Europe's "The Final Countdown" was included on Engine Room Recordings 2011 compilation album, Guilt by Association Vol. 3.

Farrah co-founder Andrew Campbell also owns and runs the indie record label Lojinx.

== Jez Ashurst ==
The lead singer of Farrah, Jez Ashurst, is also a producer and songwriter. In 2015 he worked with Shane Filan from Irish pop band Westlife for two tracks on the Right Here album, where it charted No. 1 in Irish Albums Chart.

Jez Ashurst has also written songs recorded by Gabrielle Aplin, Boyzone, Will Young, the Click Five, Natalie Bassingthwaighte, Brian McFadden, Hanson, Little Mix and Cliff Richard. He has also written with Maisie Peters and Tom Walker

== Discography ==
=== Studio albums ===
- 2001 – Moustache
- 2004 – Me Too
- 2005 – Stopgap Product (Japan only mini-album)
- 2007 – Cut Out and Keep
- 2009 – Farrah (Japanese version)
- 2010 – Farrah
- 2012 – Bees & Honey (demos, live & rarities compilation)

=== Singles ===
- 1999 – "Terry" (UK)
- 2000 – "Living For The Weekend" (UK)
- 2001 – "I Wanna Be Your Boyfriend" (UK)
- 2001 – "Tired Of Apologising" (UK)
- 2004 – "Daytime TV" (France)
- 2005 – "Tongue Tied" (UK)
- 2005 – "Christmas Is Cancelled" (free download)
- 2007 – "No Reason Why" (Japan)
- 2008 – "Can't Kick The Habit" (Japan)
- 2010 – "Swings & Roundabouts" (UK)
- 2011 – "Scarborough" (UK)

=== Compilations ===
- 2001 – Zipped Up And Down Under
- 2001 – The Cornerstone Player 024
- 2004 – Bob Harris Presents - Volume 5
- 2004 – Autumn Almanac 2004
- 2005 – Asian Kung-Fu Generation presents Nano-Mugen Compilation
- 2007 – International Pop Overthrow - Volume 10
- 2007 – Sweet Relief
- 2008 – Christmas Present
- 2009 – Asian Kung-Fu Generation presents Nano-Mugen Compilation 2009
- 2011 – "The Final Countdown" (Europe cover) from Guilt by Association Vol. 3
- 2013 – "Long Way Down" on Lojinx State of the Union label compilation sampler
