= Me Too (album) =

Studio album by Farrah
- Released: 2004
- Recorded: 2002–2003
- Genre: Indie; Powerpop; Rock
- Label: Lojinx (UK); Egging (Japan); Rock Indiana (Spain); Sony/Polaris (France)
- Producer: Just A Noise

Farrah chronology
Moustache (2001)	Me Too (2004)	Cut Out And Keep (2007)

Me Too is the second album released by UK band Farrah.

== Track listing ==
1. Tongue Tied
2. Daytime TV
3. He Gives an Inch
4. The One That Got Away
5. This Is My Life
6. Hopelessly Devoted
7. First and Last
8. It's Different for Girls
9. Half as Strong
10. Wake Up
11. School Disco (Japanese Version only)
12. The Last Word
13. Nigel (Japanese Version only)
14. High and Low

== Notes ==
- It's Different for Girls is a cover version of the song originally written and performed by Joe Jackson.
- The album was released on vinyl in Japan with alternative artwork.
