= Everything to Me (Shane Filan song) =

Single by Shane Filan

from the album You and Me
- Released: 23 August 2013
- Genre: Pop
- Length: 3:23
- Label: Capitol Records
- Songwriters: Shane Filan, Tom Wilding, Nick Atkinson
- Producer: Martin Terefe

Shane Filan singles chronology
"Everything to Me" (2013)	"About You" (2013)

Music video
- Everything to Me on YouTube

"Everything to Me (ETM)" is the debut solo single by Irish singer-songwriter Shane Filan, released on 23 August 2013 in Ireland and 25 August 2013 worldwide, from his debut studio album You and Me. The single together with his other song "One of These Days" of the album was also featured on the soundtrack album of the British animated comedy film Postman Pat: The Movie and released to UK radio stations afterward.

The song was written by Shane Filan, Nick Atkinson, and Tom Wilding. It was produced by Martin Terefe. It topped the Irish iTunes list on the day of release. The song peaked at number 7 on the Irish Singles Chart and number 14 on the UK Singles Chart. The single was included on the compilation albums For Mum With Love and Your Songs 2014.

== Background ==
This is Filan's first release as a solo artist after being a lead singer of Westlife for 14 years. The lyrics talk about optimism. After Westlife disbanded in 2012, Filan was signed up as a solo artist by Capitol Records.

== Music video ==
The video for the song shows Filan walking around a large land surrounded by planes with other people before waking up in a bed hung up on the wing of one of the planes.

== Track listing ==
Everything to Me - standard version
No.	Title	Writer(s)	Length
1.	"Everything to Me"	Nick Atkinson, Shane Filan, Tom Wilding	3:23
2.	"Everytime"	David Sneddon, James Bauer-Mein, Shane Filan	3:31
3.	"Once"	Kylie Sackley, Shane Filan	3:32
4.	"Today's Not Yesterday"	David Sneddon, James Bauer-Mein, Shane Filan	3:20

Everything to Me - Southeast Asian EP version
No.	Title	Writer(s)	Length
5.	"What About Now (Acoustic)"	Ben Moody, David Hodges, Josh Hartzler	4:09

== Chart performance ==
=== Weekly charts ===
Chart (2013)	Peak position
Ireland (IRMA)	7
Ireland Download (GfK Chart-Track)	7
Scotland Singles (OCC)	9
UK Singles (OCC)	14
UK Airplay (Music Week)	33
UK Download Singles (OCC)	44
UK Physical Singles (OCC)	1

== Release history ==
Country	Release date	Format	Label
Ireland	25 August 2013	Digital download	Capitol Records
