= Moustache (album) =

Studio album by Farrah
- Released: 2001
- Recorded: 1999–2000
- Genres: Indie rock, power pop
- Label: Ark 21
- Producers: Ron Rogers, Farrah

Farrah chronology
Moustache (2001)	Me Too (2004)

Professional ratings
Review scores
Source	Rating
AllMusic	2.5/5 stars

Moustache is the debut album from British indie rock band Farrah, released in 2001 through Ark 21 Records.

There are four different versions of the album, with two different covers and three different track listings.

The American version of the album features a band shot on the cover, whilst other versions show "Uncle Ted" (bass player Mike Walker's uncle who, at the time, claimed to have the longest moustache in the UK).

Moustache (with Extra Wax) was released in Spain and France and Moustache (with Exxtra Wax) was released in Japan - each version with differing bonus tracks (but the same album cover). The Japanese version was released on vinyl.
