= Baby Let's Dance =

"Baby, Let's Dance"

Promotional single by Shane Filan

from the album You and Me
- Released: 4 October 2013
- Length: 3:15
- Label: Capitol
- Songwriter(s): Shane Filan, Jon Green and Phil Thornalley.
- Producer(s): Martin Terefe

Music video
- Baby Let's Dance (Acoustic) on YouTube

"Baby Let's Dance" (stylized as Baby, Let's Dance) is a song by Irish singer-songwriter Shane Filan, released as the promotional single from his debut studio album You and Me (2013) on 4 October 2013. The song was written by Shane Filan, Jon Green and Phil Thornalley.

== Music video ==
A music video to accompany the release of "Baby Let's Dance" was first released onto YouTube on 4 October 2013 at a total length of five minutes and six seconds.

== Track listing ==
- Digital download
1. "Baby, Let's Dance" – 3:15

== Chart performance ==
Chart (2013)	Peak position
UK Singles (OCC)	198

== Release history ==
Country	Release date	Format	Label
Ireland	1 November 2013	Digital download	Capitol Records
