= Noisebox Records =

British record label

Noisebox Records was a UK record label based in Norwich in the early and mid-1990s run by Pete Morgan. The label released over 50 albums and singles from acts such as The Lemongrowers, Navigator, Waddle, Farrah, The Joeys, Steerpike, Magoo, UXB and Crest, as well as organising gigs locally and nationally. The label went out of existence in 1998. Pete Morgan still works within the industry, he is director of 'Noisebox Digital Media' and part owner of 'Burning Shed', an online record label.

== Discography ==
year	Artist	Title	Cat #	Format
1993	Volcanic, UXB, Resistance, Tribe of Senkrad	white label	NBX 001	12-inch
1993	Ivy, Steerpike, Spellbound, Lemongrowers	Backwater One	NBX 002	12-inch
1993	Republic, Waddle, NFL, Delta Radio	Backwater Two	NBX 004	12-inch
1993	Spellbound	Dark Days	NBX 005	CD EP
1993	the Joeys, Magoo, Compact Pussycat, Joyland	Backwater Three	NBX 006	CD EP
1993	Various	Mechanical Paradise	NBX 007	CD, Comp
1994	Waddle	Food	NBX 008	7-inch
1994	Lemongrowers, Neil Keeler, Soft Cotton County, Blue Script	Backwater Four	NBX 009	CD, Comp
1995	Faceless	Achievement	NBX 010	CD, Album
1995	Lemongrowers	Segment	NBX 011	CD, Album
1995	Ivy	How Do You Know It's For Real?	NBX 012	7-inch, CD
1995	Magoo	Mudshark EP	NBX 013	7-inch, Orange
1995	Joyland	Sun	NBX 014	CD, MiniAlbum
1995	The Joeys	Number One / Rain	NBX 015	7-inch, Black
1995	Magoo	Robot Carnival	NBX 016	7-inch, Blue
1996	Lemongrowers	Lemon Grove	NBX 017	7-inch, Yellow
1996	various	Now That's What I Call Noisebox	NBX 018	CD album
1996	The Joeys	Bruno Brown / Television	NBX 019	7-inch, Clear
1996	Magoo	Eye Spy EP	NBX 020	7-inch, Yellow
1996	Waddle	Arsehole Ride / Jungle	NBX 021	7-inch, Ltd, Brown
1996	Navigator	Killtaker	NBX 022	7-inch, Green
1996	Waddle	Cheeseburger	NBX 023	CD album
1996	Ivy	In The Absence of Angels	NBX 024	CD album
1996	Lemongrowers	You're Too Beautiful	NBX 025	CDS
1996	Navigator	A Little Astronomy	NBX 026	7-inch, Blue
1997	Navigator	When The Wires Fall	NBX 027	7-inch, Red
1997	Navigator	Assay EP	NBX 028	2×7″, CDS
1997	Crest / English Electric	split single	NBX 029	7-inch, green
1997	Velvie	Genial	NBX 030	7-inch, green
1997	Waddle / Egg	Untitled Split 7-inch EP	NBX 031	7-inch, EP
1997	Lemongrowers	Ultimate Mutation	NBX 032	CD album
1997	Various (33.3 bands)	33.3 EP	NBX 033	7-inch, black
1998	Crest	'68 Comeback	NBX 034	7-inch, Ltd, Orange
1998	Various	Split E.P.	NBX 035	7-inch, White
1998	Magoo	Close Continental D.N.A {Noisebox 94 - 96}	NBX 036	CD, Album, Comp
1998	Fleece	Mona Lisa / Driver	NBX 037	7-inch
1998	B-mer And Doolittle	Untitled Split 7-inch	NBX 038	7-inch, EP
1998	Crest	Summertime / Against The Landslide	NBX 039	7-inch, Yellow
1998	Fleece	This Is What You Get For Love	NBX 040	CD, Single
1999	Crest	The Small Details	NBX 042	7-inch, Ltd, Maroon
1999	Fleece	Man From Mars	NBX 043	7-inch, Red
1999	Farrah	Terry	NBX 044	7-inch, Red
2000	Fiel Garvie	Pre-VV EP	NBX 046	CDS
2000	Fiel Garvie	Vuka Vuka	NBX 047	CD album
2000	Fiel Garvie	Difference of Me/Risk	NBX 048	7-inch, yellow
2001	various	Tales From The Eastside	NBX 049	CD

== See also ==
- List of record labels
