= Shane Filan =

Irish pop singer (born 1979) 5 July

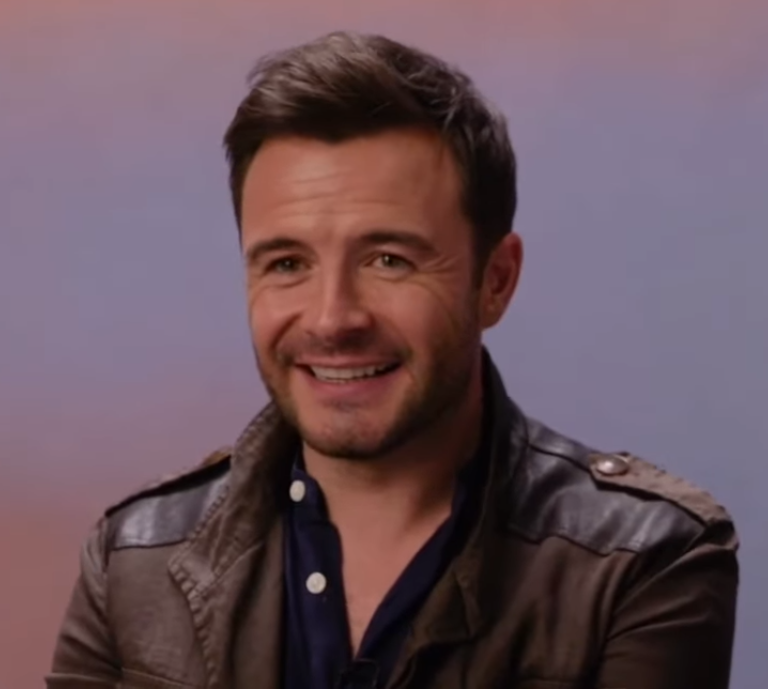
- Filan in 2021

Background information
- Also known as: Shane Steven Filan
- Born: 5 July 1979 (age 47); Sligo, Ireland
- Genres: Pop
- Occupations: Singer; songwriter
- Years active: 1997–present
- Labels: BMG; Sony BMG; Syco; RCA; Sony; Capitol; Parlophone; London; Ocean Wave; Universal; Virgin EMI; Warner; East West
- Member of: Westlife
- Website: shanefilan.com

Shane Steven Filan (born 5 July 1979) is an Irish singer best known for being a member and one of the lead singers of the pop vocal group Westlife.

Filan has released three solo albums: You and Me (2013), Right Here (2015), and Love Always (2017). He has appeared sixteen times in the UK Singles Chart with number-one hits, making him one of the most-appeared Irish music artists in British music number-one singles history.

== Early life ==
Shane Filan was born on 5 July 1979 in Sligo, Ireland. He is the son of Peter (1942–2020) and Mae Filan (née McNicholas) (1937–2019), natives of Roscommon and Mayo respectively. Filan is the youngest of seven siblings; he has three brothers and three sisters. From a very early age, Filan worked behind the counter of his parents' business – a diner in Sligo called the "Carlton Café". One of his cousins is Lucas Woodland, vocalist of Welsh band Holding Absence. He attended primary school at a local Catholic school, and secondary school at Summerhill College, with future Westlife bandmates Kian Egan and Mark Feehily. All three of them participated in a school production of Grease. The Hawkswell Theatre became a significant part of their careers.

Filan was a fan of Michael Jackson as a child, and says the singer inspired him to pursue a music career. Before Westlife, Filan studied business and accounting.

== Career ==
=== Six as One, IOYOU and Westlife (1997–2012) ===
Before Westlife, Egan, and Feehily were with Filan in a band known as Six as One and, later on, IOYOU, with other Sligonians Derrick Lacey, Graham Keighron, and Michael "Miggles" Garrett. Filan co-wrote the IOYOU song "Together Girl Forever." For six months, Shane's mother, Mae Filan, tried to phone Boyzone manager Louis Walsh, eventually succeeding in talking to him about her son's band. Three of the members were dropped and the other three, Filan, Egan, and Feehily, joined in finding two more singers for the band. The members that joined were Nicky Byrne and Brian McFadden, forming Westside. The name of the band was subsequently changed to Westlife as there were already several bands with the name Westside. Their first album was released in November 1999, titled Westlife.

With Westlife, Filan has received twenty-eight platinum discs and sold 55 million records worldwide. In his 2014 book My Side of Life, he revealed that in 2001, he had been the first member of Westlife to be offered a solo record deal, but that he had rejected it, as he was scared of going solo.

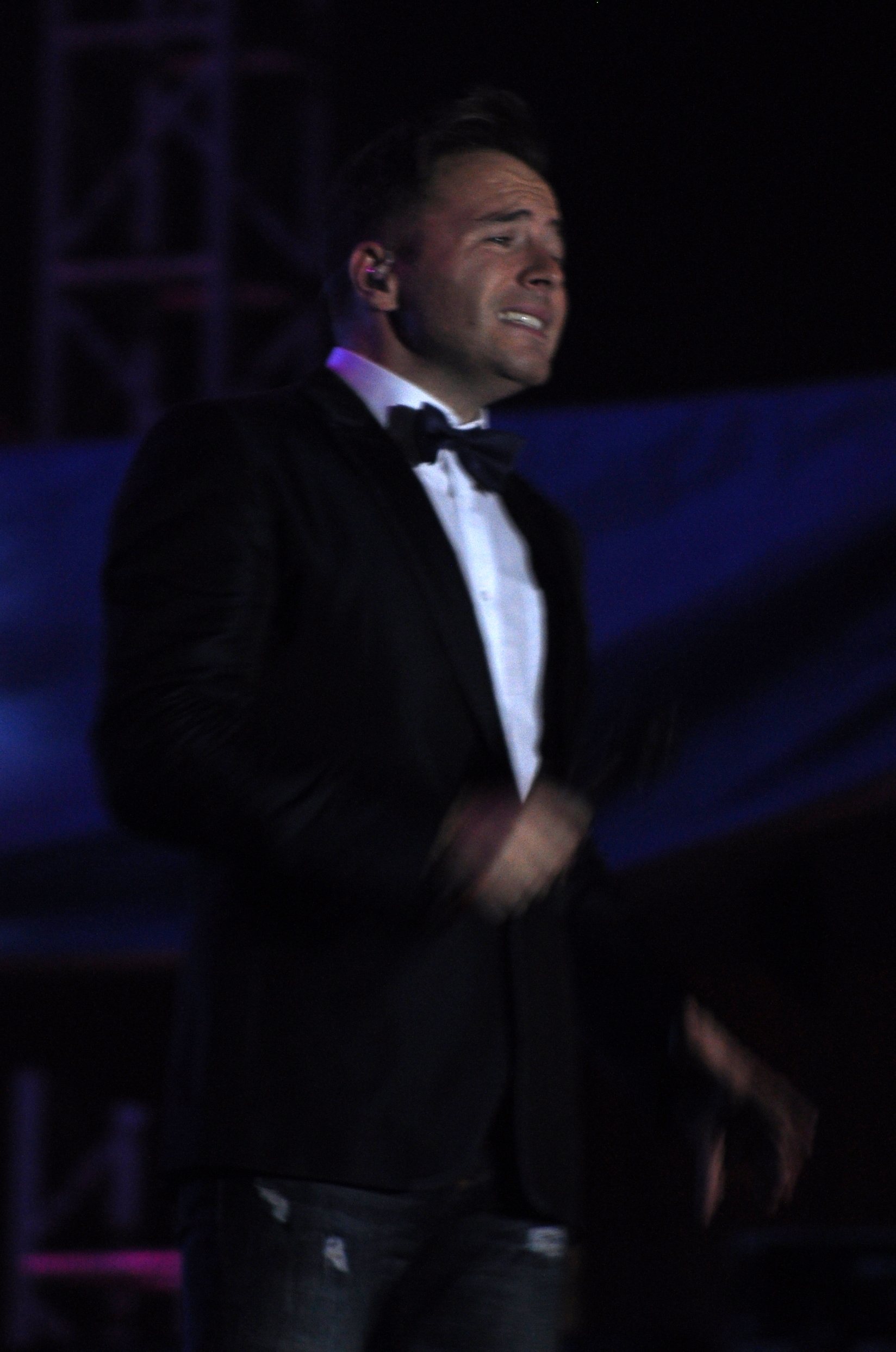
Shane Filan at the Gravity tour in Vietnam, 2011

=== Solo career, You and Me (2012–2014) ===
On 20 October 2011, Westlife announced that they had decided to split and go their separate ways at the end of their 2012 Farewell Tour. In December 2011, press reports announced Filan was close to signing a solo deal with one of several potential competing UK record labels. Filan and his manager Louis Walsh, had been in talks with several of the labels at the time. "There's four, possibly five labels so far who have made it clear that they want to sign Shane," said a music source to showbiz writer Paul Martin.

In a March 2012 interview with Paul Martin, Filan said he would be signing within the next few weeks.

"It's exciting but, of course, I'll be nervous. It's only natural when you're coming out of a band after 14 years, you don't know where your life's going to take you [...]

In 2013, Filan announced he had officially signed a record deal with UMG subsidiary London Records worth 20 million British pounds. UMG had previously offered him a solo deal in 2001; the first member of Westlife to have received such an offer, but turned it down. For the new deal, Filan stated that he had spent the past 12 months in both US and UK writing songs and recording, and that a forthcoming single and an album would be released later in the year.

On 10 May 2013, he announced that his first single would be released, along with three other tracks, later revealed in July to be "Everything to Me", and "Everytime", "Today's Not Yesterday" and "Once", respectively. The release date was announced as 25 August.

On 10 September 2013, Filan released About You, the second single from his album You and Me, followed by the album shortly after.

=== Right Here (2015) ===
After the Westlife split, bankruptcy, the You and Me Tour, and his debut autobiography My Side of Life, Filan announced on 13 March 2015 that he was working on his second studio album, Right Here. The album was mostly recorded in London and Denmark, and featured collaborations with Cutfather (The Saturdays, JLS), Jez Ashurst (Will Young, Gabrielle Aplin), Jon Maguire (Union J), Tre Jean-Marie (MNEK, Jason Derulo), and Girls Aloud. The album was released on 25 September 2015, reaching No. 1 on the Irish Album Charts during its first week.

=== Love Always (2017–2018) ===
On 25 August 2017, Filan released his third studio album Love Always. and announced his next tour, the Love Always Tour 2017.

Previously, in April 2010, an unreleased solo song by Filan called "Beautiful in White" leaked on the Internet, but was incorrectly credited as being recorded by Shayne Ward instead of Filan. During this time, Filan also sang a duet with Irish country singer Nathan Carter. The album reached No. 5 in the UK Album Charts, making it his highest-charting album in the United Kingdom.

In 2018, Filan also had success in Asia, including the Philippines, Indonesia, Malaysia, Singapore, and South Korea. Beautiful in White was particularly successful in Asia.

=== Westlife reunion with new single, album, and tour (2018–present) ===
On 3 October 2018 Westlife announced their reunion as a four-member group. In 2019 four singles were released, penned by Ed Sheeran. The group embarked on a hugely successful 50-date tour called "The 20 Tour", in honour of Westlife's 20th anniversary since the release of their first single in 1999. On 15 November their 13th studio album, Spectrum, was released.

== Personal life ==
Filan is a practising Catholic. He married his childhood sweetheart, Gillian Walsh, on 28 December 2003 at Ballintubber Abbey, followed by a reception at Ashford Castle, Ireland. They have a daughter, Nicole Rose Filan born on 23rd July 2005, and two sons, Patrick Michael Filan born on 15th September 2008 and Shane Peter Filan Jnr born on 22nd January 2010.

Gillian is the cousin of fellow band member Kian Egan, making Filan and Egan cousins-in-law.

Filan and his eldest brother, Finbarr, ran Shafin Developments – a property development company. The company was placed in receivership in May 2012 and Filan was declared bankrupt a little over a month later after suffering losses in Ireland's property crash.

== Discography ==
Filan has released three studio albums, eight singles, and two featured songs.

=== Studio albums ===
Title	Details	Peak chart positions		
Title	Details	IRE	SCO	UK
You and Me	Released: 4 November 2013; Labels: Capitol / London; Formats: CD, digital download, streaming	3	4	6
Right Here	Released: 25 September 2015; Labels: East West; Formats: CD, digital download, streaming	1	7	11
Love Always	Released: 25 August 2017; Labels: Ocean Wave; Formats: CD, digital download, streaming	5	3	5

=== Singles ===
==== As lead artist ====
Year	Title	Peak chart positions			Album
Year	Title	IRE	UK	SCO	Album
2013	"Everything to Me"	7	14	9	You and Me
2013	"About You"	60	54	39	You and Me
2013	"Knee Deep in My Heart"	92	69	72	You and Me
2015	"Me and the Moon"	—	—	—	Right Here
2015	"I Could Be" (featuring Nadine Coyle)	—	—	—	Right Here
2017	"Unbreakable"	—	—	—	Love Always
2018	"Back to You"	—	—	—	Love Always
2018	"Beautiful in White"	—	—	—	Love Always
"—" denotes a single that did not chart or was not released in that territory.

==== As featured artist ====
Year	Title	Album
2015	"When I Grow Up" (The Association of Irish Musical Societies featuring Shane Filan & Grace Lee)	Non-album singles
2017	"Bridge over Troubled Water" (as part of Artists for Grenfell)	Non-album singles

==== Promotional singles ====
Year	Title	Album
2013	"Baby Let's Dance"	You and Me

=== Music videos ===
==== As lead artist ====
List of videos, showing year released and director
Title	Year	Director
"Everything To Me"	2013	Unknown
"About You"	2013	Jason Ell
"Knee Deep in My Heart"	2013	Warren Smith
"Me and the Moon"	2015	Unknown
"Unbreakable"	2017	Jonathan Lambert
"This I Promise You"	2017	Unknown
"Back to You"	2017	Unknown
"Beautiful in White"	2017	Jonathan Lambert

== Songwriting ==
Sources: APRA, ASCAP, BMI, OSA, SESAC, SOCAN, SUISA Repertoires. In SESAC, Filan uses John Francis Filan as an alias. Filan has co-written a number of songs including:

=== Westlife (1998–2012; 2018–present) ===
- "Starlight"
- "Alone Together"
- "Wild Dreams"
- "Lifeline"
- "Rewind"
- "Magic"
- "Always With Me"
- "Take Me There"
- "L.O.V.E"
- "Fragile Heart"
- "Bop Bop Baby" (reached No. 5 in the UK Singles Chart)
- "Don't Say It's Too Late"
- "I Wanna Grow Old with You"
- "I'm Missing Loving You"
- "Singing Forever"
- "Where We Belong"
- "Never Knew I Was Losing You"
- "Love Crime"
- "How Does It Feel"
- "Crying Girl"
- "Reason for Living"
- "Miss You When I'm Dreaming"
- "A Little Part of Me / Little Part of Me / Extraordinary Love"^{1}
- "Love Ain't War"^{1}
- "This Life"^{1}
- "Closer"
- "Too Hard to Say Goodbye"
- "Last Mile of the Way"

=== Love Always (2017–2018) ===
- "Completely"
- "Eyes Don't Lie"
- "Crazy Over You"
- "Back To You"
- "Girl in My Heart"

=== Right Here (2015) ===
- "I Could Be"
- "Right Here"
- "Better off a Fool"
- "I Can't Get Over You"
- "Effortlessly You"
- "All My Love"

=== You and Me (2013) ===
- "Everything to Me"
- "About You"
- "All You Need to Know"
- "Knee Deep in My Heart"
- "One of These Days"
- "Everytime"
- "Always Tomorrow"
- "When I Met You"
- "Everything's Gonna Be Alright"
- "Coming Home"
- "Baby Let's Dance"
- "In the End"
- "You and Me"
- "Just the Way You Love Me"
- "Once"
- "Today's Not Yesterday"

^1 – Songs were found to be Filan's co-written songs during his time with Westlife. No other details whether it's for Westlife or not.

=== Unreleased ===
- All About You
- As Far As I Go
- Back Home
- Best is Yet to Come
- Don't Look Back
- Counting the Days
- Fall in Love With Me
- Feel Alive
- Headed for a Fall
- I Can't Get By
- I Got Nothing at All
- I Love You
- Intimate
- Lean Back
- Learn to Fly
- Letting it Go
- Like 'Em Wild
- Love and Plan B
- Lullaby
- More
- Never Give Up Lullaby
- Night Sky
- No One's in Control
- Not in This Alone
- One Last Second Chance
- Only Got Tonight
- Only You
- Our Story
- Save Me
- Say We'll Meet Again
- Shine Down
- Slowing Down
- Skyline
- The Perfect Storm
- The Truth
- Things are Looking Up
- Too Strong
- Wherever You Are
- Wouldn't Change a Thing About You
- You Always Will
- Your Ordinary Man

=== Songs written for other artists ===
- "Listen Girl" performed by Johan Östberg
- "Let Me Be the One" performed by Simon Casey
- "Sei Parte Ormai Di Me" performed by Il Divo, in their self-titled album (2004)
- "The Music Won't Last / Music Won't Last" performed by Jerry Given

== Tours ==
=== Concert tours ===
==== Headlining ====
===== As a solo performer =====
Year	Title	Duration	Number of shows	Notes
2014	You and Me Tour	20 February 2014 – 5 December 2014	52	
2016	Right Here Tour	3 March 2016 – 4 December 2016	33	
2017–2019	Love Always Tour	16 July 2017 – 16 March 2019	65	

===== You and Me Tour (2014) =====
Setlist

Setlist A

1. When I Met You
2. Uptown Girl
3. My Love
4. What Makes a Man
5. Everytime
6. Baby Let's Dance
7. Amazed
8. Once
9. Always Tomorrow
10. Flying Without Wings
11. Blurred Lines
12. Wake Me Up
13. What About Now
14. Mandy
15. Let It Be
16. All You Need To Know
17. About You
18. You Raise Me Up
19. Everything to Me
20. Knee Deep in My Heart

Setlist B

1. When I Met You
2. Uptown Girl
3. What Makes a Man
4. In the End
5. Amazed
6. Baby Let's Dance
7. True Colors
8. Always Tomorrow
9. Once
10. Flying Without Wings
11. Blurred Lines
12. Wake Me Up
13. What About Now
14. Mandy
15. Let It Be
16. All You Need To Know
17. About You
18. You Raise Me Up
19. Everything to Me
20. Knee Deep in My Heart

Support acts

- Klarisse de Guzman
- Ben Montague

Date	Country	City	Venue
Leg One: Europe
20 February 2014	United Kingdom	Liverpool	Philharmonic Hall
21 February 2014	United Kingdom	Birmingham	Symphony Hall
22 February 2014	United Kingdom	Reading	Hexagon Theatre
24 February 2014	United Kingdom	Manchester	Bridgewater Hall
25 February 2014	United Kingdom	Glasgow	Glasgow Concert Halls
26 February 2014	United Kingdom	Newcastle	Newcastle City Hall
27 February 2014	United Kingdom	York	Barbican Centre
1 March 2014	United Kingdom	Blackpool	Opera House Theatre
2 March 2014	United Kingdom	Cardiff	St Davids Hall
3 March 2014	United Kingdom	Nottingham	Royal Concert Hall
5 March 2014	United Kingdom	Bournemouth	Bournemouth Pavilion
6 March 2014	United Kingdom	Southend-on-Sea	Cliffs Pavilion
7 March 2014	United Kingdom	London	Hammersmith Apollo
Leg Two: Asia
13 September 2014	Indonesia	Jakarta	Upper Road Annex Building
16 September 2014	Vietnam	Ho Chi Minh City	Cargo Bar
21 September 2014	China	Shanghai	Shanghai Grand Stage
23 September 2014	China	Beijing	Workers Gymnasium
25 September 2014	China	Guangzhou	Sun Yat-Sen Memorial Hall
26 September 2014	China	Nanjing	Wutaishan Gymnasium
27 September 2014	China	Chengdu	UESTC Gymnasium
29 September 2014	China	Hong Kong	Asia World Expo 10
1 October 2014	Philippines	Manila	World Trade Center Metro Manila
Leg Three: Europe
23 October 2014	United Kingdom	Portsmouth	Portsmouth Guildhall
24 October 2014	United Kingdom	Tunbridge Wells	Assembly Hall Theatre
25 October 2014	United Kingdom	Worthing	Assembly Hall
26 October 2014	United Kingdom	Bradford	St. Georges Hall
28 October 2014	United Kingdom	Motherwell	Motherwell Concert Hall
29 October 2014	United Kingdom	Aberdeen	Music Hall
30 October 2014	United Kingdom	Kilmarnock	The Grand Hall
31 October 2014	United Kingdom	Carlisle	Carlisle Sands Centre
2 November 2014	United Kingdom	Barrow in Furness	The Forum
3 November 2014	United Kingdom	Brighton	Floral Pavilion
5 November 2014	United Kingdom	Leicester	De Montfort Hall
6 November 2014	United Kingdom	Bolton	Albert Halls
7 November 2014	United Kingdom	Rhyl	Pavilion
9 November 2014	United Kingdom	Warrington	Parr Hall
10 November 2014	United Kingdom	Crawley	The Hawth
11 November 2014	United Kingdom	King's Lynn	Corn Exchange
12 November 2014	United Kingdom	Lowestoft	Marina Theatre
14 November 2014	United Kingdom	Porthcawl	Grand Pavilion
15 November 2014	United Kingdom	St Albans	St Albans Arena
16 November 2014	United Kingdom	Cheltenham	Cheltenham Town Hall
17 November 2014	United Kingdom	Croydon	Fairfield Hall
19 November 2014	United Kingdom	Weston-super-Mare	Super Mare Playhouse Theatre
20 November 2014	United Kingdom	Margate	Margate Winter Gardens
21 November 2014	United Kingdom	Basildon	Towngate Theatre
23 November 2014	United Kingdom	Stevenage	Stevenage Leisure Centre
24 November 2014	United Kingdom	Cambridge	Cambridge Corn Exchange
25 November 2014	United Kingdom	Ipswich	Regent Theatre
27 November 2014	United Kingdom	Hull	Hull City Hall
28 November 2014	United Kingdom	Redhill	Harlequin Theatre
5 December 2014	Ireland	Sligo	Knocknarea Arena

Cancelled Shows

Date	Country	City	Venue	Reason for Cancellation
19 September 2014	Taiwan	Taipei	Nangang 101	Transportation Issues

===== Right Here Tour (2016) =====
Setlist
1. Everything to Me
2. What About Now
3. Effortlessly You
4. Home
5. About You
6. Swear It Again
7. Shut Up and Dance
8. World of Our Own
9. Worst Kind of Love
10. I Can't Get Over You
11. Fool Again
12. Knee Deep in My Heart
13. I Could Be
14. Right Here
15. Uptown Girl
16. Me and the Moon
17. You Raise Me Up
18. White Christmas (Manado date only)
19. Merry Christmas Everyone (Manado date only)

Support acts

- Joe Miles
- Nikki Loy

Date	Country	City	Venue
Leg One: Europe
3 March 2016	United Kingdom	Reading	Hexagon Theatre
4 March 2016	United Kingdom	Nottingham	Royal Concert Hall
5 March 2016	United Kingdom	Northampton	Royal and Derngate
7 March 2016	United Kingdom	Plymouth	Plymouth Pavilions
8 March 2016	United Kingdom	Bournemouth	Bournemouth Pavilion
9 March 2016	United Kingdom	Cardiff	St David Hall
10 March 2016	United Kingdom	Southend-on-Sea	Cliffs Pavilion
12 March 2016	United Kingdom	Eastbourne	Congress Theatre
13 March 2016	United Kingdom	London	London Palladium
15 March 2016	United Kingdom	Belfast	Ulster Hall
18 March 2016	Ireland	Cork	Cork Opera House
19 March 2016	Ireland	Dublin	Olympia Theatre
21 March 2016	United Kingdom	York	Barbican Centre
22 March 2016	United Kingdom	Manchester	Bridgewater Hall
23 March 2016	United Kingdom	Llandudno	Venue Cymru
25 March 2016	United Kingdom	Newcastle	Newcastle City Hall
26 March 2016	United Kingdom	Birmingham	Symphony Hall
28 March 2016	United Kingdom	Liverpool	Philharmonic Hall
29 March 2016	United Kingdom	Glasgow	Clyde Auditorium
30 March 2016	United Kingdom	Inverness	Inverness Leisure
Leg Two: Asia
29 September 2016	Indonesia	Jakarta	Colosseum
30 September 2016	Indonesia	Medan	Retrospective
Leg Three: Europe
12 October 2016	United Kingdom	Dundee	Caird Hall
13 October 2016	United Kingdom	Motherwell	Motherwell Concert Hall
14 October 2016	United Kingdom	Newcastle	Tyne Theatre and Opera House
16 October 2016	United Kingdom	Hull	Hull City Hall
17 October 2016	United Kingdom	Bradford	Alhambra Theatre
18 October 2016	United Kingdom	Peterborough	The Cresset
19 October 2016	United Kingdom	Watford	Colosseum
21 October 2016	United Kingdom	Tunbridge Wells	Assembly Hall Theatre
22 October 2016	United Kingdom	Portsmouth	Portsmouth Guildhall
23 October 2016	United Kingdom	Stoke-on-Trent	Victoria Hall
Leg Four: Asia
4 December 2016	Indonesia	Manado	Megamas Marina Plaza

===== Love Always Tour (2017–2019) =====
Setlist

Setlist A

1. When You're Looking Like That
2. About You
3. Unbreakable
4. This I Promise You
5. What Makes a Man
6. Everything to Me
7. Beautiful in White
8. What About Now
9. Knee Deep in My Heart
10. Eternal Flame
11. I Can't Make You Love Me
12. Heaven
13. Cake by the Ocean
14. Power of Love
15. Uptown Girl
16. If I Let You Go
17. You Raise Me Up
18. Don't Dream It's Over
19. World of Our Own

Setlist B

1. Unbreakable
2. My Love
3. Beautiful in White
4. Need You Now
5. Uptown Girl

Setlist C

1. Unbreakable
2. My Love
3. Beautiful in White
4. Uptown Girl

Setlist D

1. When You're Looking Like That
2. About You
3. Unbreakable
4. This I Promise You
5. Swear It Again
6. Beautiful in White
7. My Love
8. What About Now
9. Need You Now
10. If I Let You Go
11. Heaven
12. Uptown Girl
13. You Raise Me Up
14. World of Our Own
15. Back to You
16. Home
17. Knee Deep in My Heart

Setlist E

1. Knee Deep in My Heart
2. About You
3. Swear It Again
4. My Love
5. Heaven
6. Need You Now
7. Unbreakable
8. Beautiful in White
9. If I Let You Go
10. What About Now
11. This I Promise You
12. Uptown Girl
13. You Raise Me Up
14. World of Our Own

Setlist F

1. Everything to Me
2. About You
3. Unbreakable
4. This I Promise You
5. Swear It Again
6. Beautiful in White
7. What About Now
8. Home
9. Heaven
10. Need You Now
11. My Love
12. If I Let You Go
13. Fool Again
14. Happy Birthday
15. Uptown Girl
16. You Raise Me Up
17. Flying Without Wings
18. World of Our Own

Setlist G

1. Everything to Me
2. About You
3. Unbreakable
4. This I Promise You
5. Swear It Again
6. Beautiful in White
7. What About Now
8. Knee Deep in My Heart
9. Home
10. Heaven
11. My Love
12. If I Let You Go
13. Flying Without Wings
14. Need You Now
15. You Raise Me Up
16. Uptown Girl
17. World of Our Own

Setlist H

1. When You're Looking Like That
2. What About Now
3. Swear It Again
4. Beautiful in White
5. Heaven
6. My Love
7. If I Let You Go
8. You Raise Me Up
9. Uptown Girl
10. World of Our Own

Support acts:

- Guy Sebastian
- Matt Gresham
- Max Restaino
- Andy Brown
- Sitti
- Sabrina
- V.O.S.
- Angeline Quinto (replacement for Morissette in the Davao leg)
- Morissette (cancelled due to voice rest)
- Jed Madela

Date	Country	City	Venue
Leg One: Asia
16 July 2017	Vietnam	Ho Chi Minh City	Lan Anh Stadium
22 July 2017	Indonesia	Surabaya	Surabaya Convention Hall
Leg Two: Europe
29 July 2017	Ireland	Naas	Punchestown
Leg Three: Asia
18 August 2017	Indonesia	Jogjakarta	Prambanan Jazz Festival
19 August 2017	Indonesia	Bandung	Trans Studio
Leg Four: Europe
20 September 2017	United Kingdom	Dundee	Caird Hall
21 September 2017	United Kingdom	Glasgow	SEC Armadillo
23 September 2017	United Kingdom	Edinburgh	Edinburgh Festival Theatre
24 September 2017	United Kingdom	Carlisle	Carlisle Sands Centre
25 September 2017	United Kingdom	Newcastle	Tyne Theatre
26 September 2017	United Kingdom	Halifax	Victoria Theatre
28 September 2017	United Kingdom	York	Barbican Centre
29 September 2017	United Kingdom	Buxton	Opera House Buxton
30 September 2017	United Kingdom	Nottingham	Royal Concert Hall
1 October 2017	United Kingdom	London	O2 Shepherd's Bush Empire
3 October 2017	United Kingdom	Northampton	Royal and Derngate
4 October 2017	United Kingdom	Telford	Oakengates Theatre
6 October 2017	United Kingdom	Liverpool	Liverpool Olympia
7 October 2017	United Kingdom	Colchester	Charter Hall
8 October 2017	United Kingdom	Swindon	Wyvern Theatre
9 October 2017	United Kingdom	Peterborough	The Cresset
11 October 2017	United Kingdom	Leicester	De Montfort Hall
12 October 2017	United Kingdom	Margate	Margate Winter Gardens
13 October 2017	United Kingdom	Reading	Hexagon Theatre
14 October 2017	United Kingdom	Salisbury	Salisbury City Hall
16 October 2017	United Kingdom	Birmingham	Birmingham Town Hall
17 October 2017	United Kingdom	Portsmouth	Portsmouth Guildhall
18 October 2017	United Kingdom	Cardiff	St David's Hall
19 October 2017	Ireland	Dublin	Olympia Theatre
22 October 2017	United Kingdom	Belfast	Waterfront Hall
Leg Five: Asia
4 February 2018	Singapore		Esplande Annexe Studio
6 February 2018	Malaysia	Kuala Lumpur	The Westin KL
9 February 2018	Philippines	Manila	Robinsons Mall – Ermita
10 February 2018	Philippines	Cebu City	Robinsons Mall – Cebu
11 February 2018	Philippines	Quezon City	Robinsons Magnolia
4 March 2018	Indonesia	Surabaya	Ciputra Hall
10 March 2018	Singapore		Resorts World Sentosa, Hard Rock Cafe Hotel Coliseum
17 March 2018	Indonesia	Yogyakarta	Sahid Jaya Convention Hall
18 March 2018	Indonesia	Palembang	Palembang Sports Convention Centre
Leg Six: Europe
30 April 2018	United Kingdom	Gateshead	Sage Gateshead
1 May 2018	United Kingdom	Leicester	De Montfort Hall
2 May 2018	United Kingdom	Sheffield	Sheffield City Hall
4 May 2018	United Kingdom	Hull	Hull City Hall
5 May 2018	United Kingdom	Birmingham	New Alexandra Theatre
6 May 2018	United Kingdom	Northampton	Royal and Derngate
7 May 2018	United Kingdom	Ipswich	Regent Theatre
9 May 2018	United Kingdom	Tunbridge Wells	Assembly Hall
10 May 2018	United Kingdom	Cambridge	Cambridge Corn Exchange
11 May 2018	United Kingdom	Guildford	G Live
12 May 2018	United Kingdom	Manchester	Opera House
14 May 2018	United Kingdom	Swansea	Swansea Grand Theatre
15 May 2018	United Kingdom	Liverpool	Liverpool Olympia
16 May 2018	United Kingdom	Glasgow	Theatre Royal
Leg Seven: Asia
27 July 2018	South Korea	Seoul	Jangchung Gymnasium
Leg Eight: Europe
11 August 2018	United Kingdom	Doncaster	Yorkshire Wildlife Park (Wildlife Safari Night)
25 August 2018	United Kingdom	London	Dagenham Central Park (Now That's a Festival)
Leg Nine: Asia
15 September 2018	Philippines	Quezon City	Kia Theatre
16 September 2018	Philippines	Davao City	SMX Convention Center
31 December 2018	Vietnam	Hanoi	Hang Day Stadium
19 January 2019	Malaysia	Shah Alam	Elmina Central Park
16 March 2019	Indonesia	Jakarta	Panin Bank Super Bonanza
12 April 2019	China	Chengdu	Hewlett-Packard Event at Shangrila Chengdu

==== Supporting ====
===== Lionel Richie (2018) =====
Date	City	Venue
Europe
16 June 2018	Leigh	Leigh Sports Village
17 June 2018	Carlisle	Brunton Park
23 June 2018	Hove	County Cricket Ground
24 June 2018	Wells-next-The-Sea	Holkham Hall

=== Promotional tours ===
- 2013–2017 UK and Ireland Tour
- 2013, 2014, 2018 Indonesia, Malaysia, Philippine, Singapore Tour

== Honours and awards ==
Year	Ceremony	Category	Result
2000	TV Hits Awards	Voice of the 21st century	Won
2000	TV Hits Awards	Good Looking Pop Star	Won
2000	Smash Hits Awards	Most Fanciable Male	Won
2001	Smash Hits Awards	Sexiest Male Celebrity	Won

== See also ==
- Westlife songlist
- Westlife tours
- Westlife awards
- UK Singles Chart records and statistics
- List of artists who reached number one on the UK Singles Chart
- List of best-selling music artists in the United Kingdom in singles sales
- List of artists by number of UK Singles Chart number ones
- List of UK Singles Chart number ones of the 2000s
- List of UK Singles Downloads Chart number ones of the 2000s
- List of UK Albums Chart number ones of the 2000s
- List of artists who reached number one in Ireland
