= About You (Shane Filan song) =

Single by Shane Filan

from the album You and Me
- Released: 3 November 2013
- Genre: Pop
- Length: 3:47
- Label: Capitol
- Songwriter(s): Shane Filan, Steve Mac, Wayne Hector
- Producer(s): Martin Terefe

Shane Filan singles chronology
"Everything to Me" (2013)	"About You" (2013)	"Knee Deep in My Heart" (2013)

Music video
- About You on YouTube

"About You" is a single by Irish singer-songwriter Shane Filan, released as the second single from his debut studio album You and Me (2013). The single was released on 3 November 2013 in Ireland and 25 August 2013 worldwide. The song was written by Shane Filan, Steve Mac and Wayne Hector

== Music video ==
A music video to accompany the release of "About You" was first released onto YouTube on 6 October 2013 at a total length of four minutes and twelve seconds. It was credited under Parlophone Records.

== Track listing ==
Digital download
No.	Title	Length
1.	"About You"	3:47

== Chart performance ==
Chart (2013)	Peak position
Ireland (IRMA)	60
Scotland (OCC)	39
UK Singles (Official Charts Company)	54
UK Singles Downloads (OCC)	54

== Release history ==
Country	Release date	Format	Label
Ireland	3 November 2013	Digital download	Capitol Records
