= Knee Deep in My Heart =

Single by Shane Filan

from the album You and Me
- Released: 29 November 2013
- Genre: Pop, folk rock
- Length: 3:06
- Label: Capitol Records
- Songwriter(s): Shane Filan, Jon Green, Cass Lowe
- Producer(s): Martin Terefe, Cass Lowe

Shane Filan singles chronology
"About You" (2013)	"Knee Deep in My Heart" (2013)	"True Colours" (2014)

Music video
- Knee Deep in My Heart on YouTube

"Knee Deep in My Heart" is a song by Irish singer-songwriter Shane Filan, released as the third single from his debut studio album You and Me (2013). The song was released as a single on 29 November 2013. The song has peaked to number 92 on the Irish Singles Chart and number 69 on the UK Singles Chart.

== Background ==
In an interview with Digital Spy, Shane Filan said "Knee Deep In My Heart' is one of my favourite songs from the album. It's all about when I fell in love with my wife Gillian. And musically it was inspired by my trip to Nashville. It's a real singalong number, and I can't wait to play it on tour next year!”.

== Music video ==
Filan's wife Gillian and his three children all feature in the music video for the single. The video was set in the English countryside and shows Shane driving past rolling hills in a vintage car before arriving at a friend's wedding. All the while, the singer is waxing lyrical about a love who stole his heart. Despite being set in the UK, the video is trying to channel the spirit of a traditional Irish wedding, complete with a traditional band. Filan was joined by several members of his family and friends for the reception scenes where the wedding party continues. His wife Gillian can be seen spinning around on the dance floor wearing a pretty frock. Meanwhile, his children feature prominently. The drummer in the video is also a family friend as are several of the other participants. The music Video also features Linedance instructor Maggie Gallagher and her dance troupe Celtica from Coventry. After missing the wedding, the singer arrives in his car before taking to the stage and performing at the wedding reception. The video is set in the summer time and sees Filan enjoying a few pints of Guinness with his pals before dancing the night away and singing his heart out.

== Track listing ==
Digital download
No.	Title	Length
1.	"Knee Deep in My Heart"	3:06

== Chart performance ==
Chart (2013)	Peak position
Ireland (IRMA)	92
Scotland (OCC)	72
UK Singles (OCC)	69
UK Singles Downloads (OCC)	67
