= Magoo (band) =

- Origin: Norfolk, England
- Genres: Alternative rock, indie rock
- Years active: 1992–2014
- Labels: Noisebox Records, Chemikal Underground, Global Warming Records, MayGoZero, Series 8 Records
- Members: Andrew Rayner; Owen Turner; Stacy Gow; Dave Lake
- Past members: Adam Blackbourn; Gill Sandell; Stephen Gilchrist; David Bamford; Andrew Hodge; Chris Thorpe-Tracey; Rhys Harper; Jen Heagren; Adam Maggots; Catherine Rayner; Charlie Taylor
- Website: thesickroom.co.uk

Magoo are an English indie rock band which formed in Norfolk, England in 1992.

== Biography ==
The band's influences include Guided by Voices, Stereolab, Pavement, the Flaming Lips and John Peel, and spent their early years playing local venues in the Norwich area. Having released several singles on Norwich's Noisebox Records, they were signed by the Scottish record label, Chemikal Underground.

During their time with Chemikal Underground, Magoo played at the CMJ Music Marathon in New York and the Glastonbury Festival, as well as smaller events around the UK.

In June 1996, the band recorded four songs in session for the John Peel show on BBC Radio 1. They went on to record a further six sessions and were one of the last bands to record a session before Peel's untimely death.

The band subsequently parted company with Chemikal Underground and set up their own studio Sickroom Studios, in the heart of Norfolk to record their new material in. Magoo continue to play shows around the UK.

== Discography ==
=== Albums ===
- The Soateramic Sounds of Magoo (1997), Beggars Banquet/Chemikal Underground
- Close Continental D.N.A. (1998), Noisebox Records
- Vote the Pacifist Ticket Today (1998), Chemikal Underground
- Realist Week (2001), Global Warming Records
- Popsongs (2005), MayGoZero
- The All Electric Amusement Arcade (2006), Series 8 Records
- The Continuing Adventures of Magoo (2012), Hungry Audio

=== Singles and EPs ===
- The Mudshark EP (1995), Noisebox Records
- "Robot Carnival" (1995), Noisebox Records
- "Eye Spy" (1996), Noisebox Records
- "Tremor, Tremor, Tremor" (1997), Elefant Records
- "A to Z and Back Again" (1997), Chemikal Underground
- "Red Lines (Are Fine)" (1997), Chemikal Underground
- "Holy Smoke!" (1998), Chemikal Underground
- "Swiss Border Escape" (1998), Chemikal Underground
- "Champion The Wonderhorse - Another Vibrations From The Edge of Sanity Record Compilation EP" (1999), Vibrations From The Edge of Sanity
- "Nastro Adhesivo/Big Eyed Beans From Venus (Promo Only)" (2001), Sickroom Gramophonic Collective
- "East Polar Opposite Can Dream" (2001), Global Warming
- "Knowledge Is Power" (2001), Global Warming
- "The Big Comeback Starts Here" (2002), Starharbour
- "Soft Family Rock" (2002), MaYGoZero
- "Can't Get Off the Ground Today / Expansion Ride" (2003), MaYGoZero
- "Superteen Scene" (2006), Series 8 Records
- "Four Song E.P." (2014), No Label
