= Ben Montague =

- Origin: Farnborough, Hampshire, England
- Genres: Pop
- Occupation: Singer-songwriter
- Instrument(s): Guitar, piano
- Years active: 2009–present
- Labels: MWM limited
- Website: benmontague.co.uk

Ben Montague is an English musician, singer-songwriter and multi instrumentalist from Farnborough, Kent, England. He is perhaps best known for his single "Haunted" from the first album, Overcome. His latest album, Back into Paradise, was launched in June 2015 through the MWM label. He was on a nationwide tour which culminated in the Dello bar in Dublin on 12 December 2015. Prior to that Montague supported Simply Red in Brighton on the 28 and 29 November 2015.

== History ==
=== Overcome and early successes ===
His musical career began in earnest in 2010 when the singles from what would become his first album Overcome received high praise from UK Radio stations. "Can't hold Me Down" was added to the BBC Radio 2 playlist for 5 weeks and follow up "Haunted" later became their Record of the Week followed in June 2010 by "Broken". The album Overcome commercially released via his management company in early 2011.The album, titled Tales of Flying And Falling was released in 2013 through Nusic and EMI Label Services – the full-length album was produced at Rockfield Studios by Dave Eringa, the producer behind records for Manic Street Preachers, Idlewild and Kylie Minogue.The first single from the album, "Love Like Stars", was released on 6 July 2012. Second single "Another Hard Fall" was released on 26 August 2012 and was added to the Radio 2 B List from 4 August 2012. After a period of reflection and being involved in the start up of a specialist guitar company, The American Guitar Company, Montague has produced his third album, Back into Paradise, in 2015 through MWM Limited.

=== 2015–present ===
In June 2015, his third album Back into Paradise was released with the support of producer Peter-John Vettese who co wrote "Runaway", engineering and mixing by Tuft Evans, guidance of John Giddins, and key musicians, Jimmy Sims on bass, Mark Pusey playing drums, and Robbie McIntosh on lead guitar. Montague's single "We Start Over" achieved BBC Radio 2's Record of the Week. He was also asked to perform on The Chris Evans Breakfast Show with Sara Cox.

Back into Paradise Deluxe Album reached no. 7 in the iTunes singer songwriter chart.

== Touring ==
In the past, Montague has performed live appearances with The Lighthouse Family, playing as main support in Academy venues, alongside Stereophonics as a part of F1 Rocks, a music event run at the 2010 Italian Grand Prix in Milan; and later on The Code Tour 2012 with The Wanted and Lawson. The Code Tour 2012 saw Montague perform alongside Lawson and The Wanted. 2014 saw Montague support Shane Filan of Westlife.

== Discography ==
=== Albums ===
- Overcome (2011)
- Unknown Reward (2012)
- Tales of Flying And Falling (2013)
- Back into Paradise (2015) MWM Limited through Absolute.

=== Singles ===
- "Can't Hold Me Down" (2009)
- "Haunted" (2010) UK No. 97
- "Love Like Stars" (2012)
- "Another Hard Fall" (2012)
- "Deep End"/"Liberty Road" (2012)
- "Sweet Amelia" (2013)
- "The Truth" (2013)
- "Another Chance" (2015)
- "We Start Over" (2016)
