= You and Me (Shane Filan album) =

Studio album by Shane Filan
- Released: 1 November 2013
- Recorded: November 2012 – August 2013
- Studio: Dublin, London and Nashville
- Genre: Pop, folk rock, country
- Length: 74:19
- Label: Capitol
- Producer: Steve Mac, Paul Barry, Martin Terefe, David Sneddon#The Nexus, Patrick Mascall

Shane Filan chronology
You and Me (2013)	Right Here (2015)

Singles from You and Me
- 1. "Everything to Me" Released: 23 August 2013; 2. "About You" Released: 1 November 2013; 3. "Knee Deep in My Heart" Released: 29 November 2013

Professional ratings
Review scores
Source	Rating
The Irish Times	2/5 stars
Renowned for Sound	4.5/5 stars

You and Me is the debut solo album by Irish singer-songwriter Shane Filan. It was released via Capitol Records on 1 November 2013 in Ireland. The album was preceded by the release of his debut single "Everything to Me" which peaked at number 14 on the UK Singles Chart on the week of release. The album's second single, "About You", co-written by long-term collaborators Steve Mac and Wayne Hector, was released on 1 November 2013. "Knee Deep in My Heart" was released as the third and final single on 29 November 2013. The song "Baby Let's Dance" was released as promotional single on 4 October 2013. The album reached No. 6 in the UK.

== Background ==
Filan reportedly signed a record deal which would see him cut his first studio album in April of this year. Filan said of the deal; ""I am so excited to be joining London Records, Universal Music, and being back in the studio in London and Nashville recording new songs has been amazing. One of the things that pleases me the most about this record is that I've been given the opportunity to write my own songs. I'm so excited for people to hear them!" Filan later announced the release of his debut single "Everything to Me" on 5 July, stating "Working on solo material is something I had always dreamed of doing, and I'm incredibly happy with the results. 'Everything To Me' is a very personal song to me lyrically; it is such an upbeat and optimistic record, perfect for the summer. I can't wait for people to hear it!"

== Recording ==
Filan said of the album; "I got off to a really good start. Everything to Me felt like beginners' luck, but I didn't know how good it was. Then the label were phoning, going "This is great!" I’d shown to myself I could do this and that took the pressure off. I was flying in those first two weeks and then suddenly I was in Nashville with really famous songwriters, partly thinking 'WOW!' but also 'Right, let's do this.'" The album features writing credits and production from the likes of Steve Mac, Wayne Hector, Nick Atkinson, David Sneddon#The Nexus, Paul Barry, Cass Lowe, Patrick Mascall, Kylie Sackley, Brandon Hood and Martin Terefe, who between them have produced for the likes of Gabrielle Aplin, Lana Del Rey, Enrique Iglesias, LeAnn Rimes, Faith Hill and Jason Mraz. Filan revealed that he took inspiration from the likes of The Lumineers, Train and Mumford & Sons when writing and recording the album.

== Promotion ==
He had television and radio promo tour in United Kingdom like on 7 August 2014: 0800 Real Radio, Cardiff; 1030 Town and Broadcasting, Cardiff; 1330 BBC Radio Wales Cardiff; 1545 96.4 Wave Swansea; 1610 Swansea Sound. The Everything to Me single together with his other song "One of These Days" off the album were also featured in the soundtrack album of a British animated comedy film Postman Pat: The Movie and released in UK radio stations afterwards. He later went on to his You and Me Tour in 2013 (for Everything to Me Southeast Asian EP), 2014 in Western Europe and East Asia.

== Track listing ==
You and Me – Standard edition
No.	Title	Writer(s)	Producer(s)	Length
1.	"Everything to Me"	Shane Filan, Nick Atkinson, Tom Wilding	Martin Terefe	3:23
2.	"About You"	Filan, Steve Mac, Wayne Hector	Mac	3:47
3.	"All You Need to Know"	Filan, Paul Barry, Patrick Mascall	Terefe	3:34
4.	"Knee Deep in My Heart"	Filan, Jon Green, Cass Lowe	Terefe, Cass Lowe	3:06
5.	"One of These Days"	Filan, Barry, Mascall	Terefe	3:35
6.	"Everytime"	Filan, James Bauer-Mein, David Sneddon	The Nexus	3:32
7.	"Always Tomorrow"	Filan, Ben Earle	Terefe	3:40
8.	"When I Met You"	Filan, Brandon Hood	Terefe	3:27
9.	"Everything's Gonna Be Alright"	Filan, Drew Lawrence, Chen Neeman	Terefe	3:50
10.	"Coming Home"	Filan, Barry, Mascall	Paul Meehan, Brian Rawling	3:12
11.	"Baby Let's Dance"	Filan, Green, Phil Thornalley	Terefe	3:15
12.	"In the End"	Filan, Hector, Tim Powell	Terefe	4:00
13.	"You and Me"	Filan, Jack McManus, Tim Woodcock	Terefe	3:42

You and Me – Deluxe edition bonus disc
No.	Title	Writer(s)	Producer(s)	Length
1.	"Just the Way You Love Me"	Filan, Powell, Iain James, Sandy Buglass	Terefe	3:37
2.	"Once"	Filan, Kylie Sackley	The Nexus	3:32
3.	"Today's Not Yesterday"	Filan, Bauer-Mein, Sneddon	The Nexus	3:20
4.	"About You" (acoustic)	Filan, Mac, Hector		3:50
5.	"All You Need to Know" (acoustic)	Filan, Barry, Mascall		3:36
6.	"Everytime" (acoustic)	Filan, Bauer-Mein, Sneddon		3:17
7.	"Everything to Me" (acoustic)	Filan, Atkinson, Wilding		3:19
8.	"Amazed" (acoustic)	Marv Green, Chris Lindsey, Aimee Mayo		3:45

You and Me – Super deluxe edition bonus DVD
No.	Title	Length
1.	"All You Need to Know – Documentary"

== Charts and certifications ==
=== Weekly charts ===
Chart (2013)	Peak position
Irish Albums (IRMA)	3
Scottish Albums (OCC)	4
South Korean Albums (Circle)	18
UK Albums (OCC)	6

=== Year-end charts ===
Chart (2013)	Position
UK Albums (OCC)	182

=== Certifications ===
Certifications for You and Me
Region	Certification	Certified units/sales
United Kingdom (BPI)	Silver	60,000^{*}
^{*} Sales figures based on certification alone.

== Release history ==
Region	Date	Format	Label
United Kingdom	4 November 2013	Digital download, CD	Capitol
