= Elio Pace =

English singer, songwriter

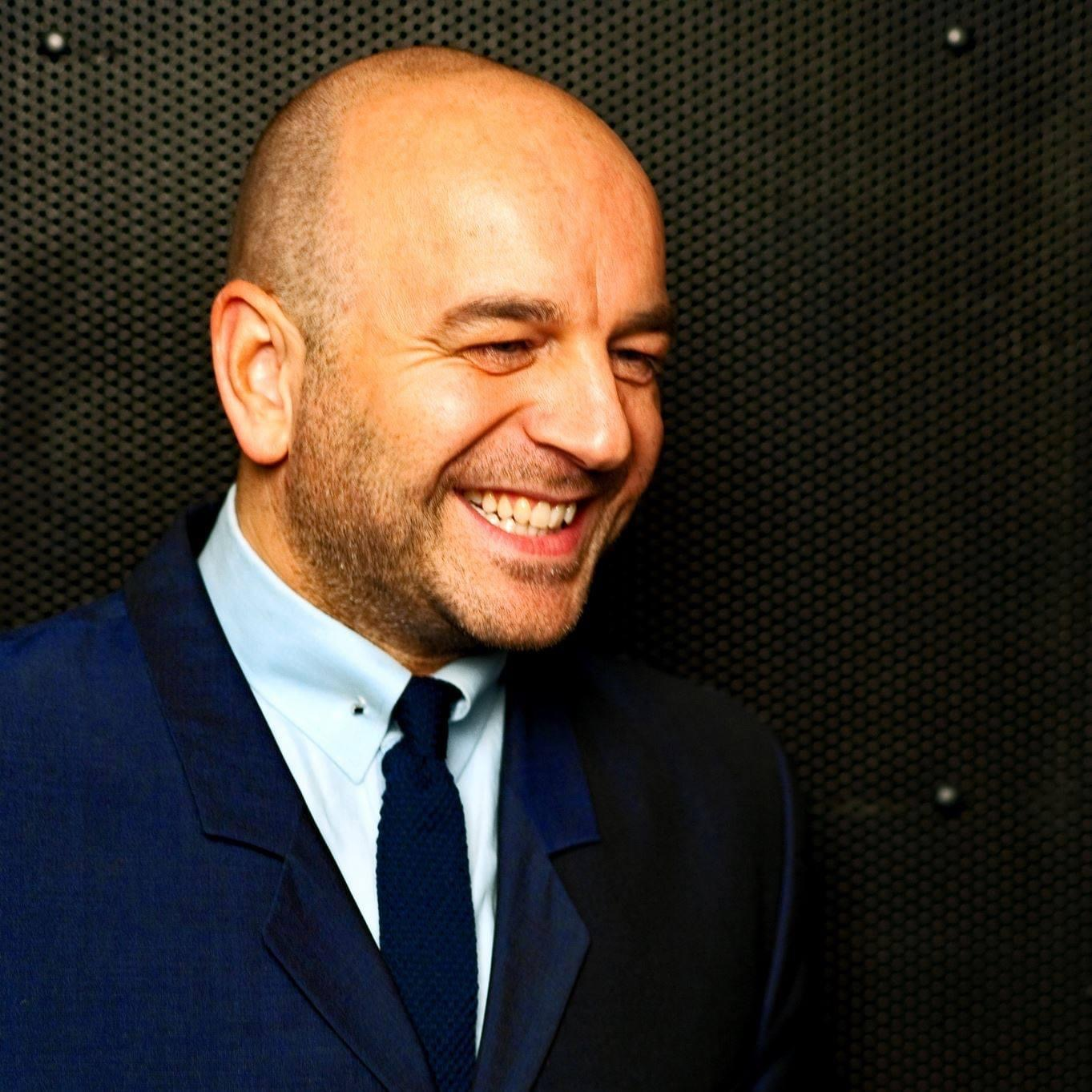
- Elio Pace

Background information
- Born: 8 February 1968 (age 58); Woking, England
- Genre: Pop rock
- Occupations: Singer-songwriter, musician, musical director
- Instruments: Vocals, piano
- Years active: 1987–present
- Label: Rosa Records
- Website: www.eliopace.com

Elio Pace (born 8 February 1968) is an English singer, songwriter, pianist, producer, and arranger.

== Early life ==
Elio was born in Woking, Surrey, in 1968 of Italian parents. He showed early signs of natural musical talent when he started to sing and play the piano at the age of four. Throughout his childhood he developed his ear for music as well as his love of rock & roll. He had his first 'proper' piano lesson at the age of eleven achieving the highest qualification of Grade 8 by the time he was seventeen.

Elio went on to train at the Leeds College of Music, and in 1988, singing and playing his own songs, he reached the final of Bob Says Opportunity Knocks on BBC TV, which led to numerous radio and television appearances including, Wogan, Michael Barrymore's Saturday Night Out and The Les Dawson Show with Shirley Bassey and Randy Crawford. In 1989, he starred in his own 30-minute documentary about his life and music, as part of ITV's The Music Makers.

== Career ==
Toured the UK in the original casts of Tutti Frutti, Great Balls of Fire and Dancing in the Street. He appeared in and was musical director for many shows, including Joseph and the Amazing Technicolor Dreamcoat (as the Pharaoh), West Side Story (as Tony); five DGM productions, Rave On, Summer in the City, Itchycoo Park, Hold Tight It's 60's Night and Hold Tight It's 70's Night, and Bill Kenwright's Thank You for the Music in which he appeared as Elton John and Billy Joel.

In 2000, he was asked to put together and direct a 15-piece band for an outdoor concert, to perform and to back other artists including Art Garfunkel, David Soul and Katrina Leskanich. Great Balls of Fire recorded live at this concert features on the album Come And Get It. In the same year he went to the USA twice – in June to Nashville to play piano and sing background vocals on a re-recording of his own song, Got The Bug Back, by a newly signed RCA recording artist and in August to act as musical director and co-star in a three-month run of the musical comedy Song of Singapore, playing the blind, jazz-pianist Freddy S. Lyme, at The New Theatre, Kansas City starring Loretta Swit from M*A*S*H. He appeared in Song of Singapore at The Minerva Theatre, Chichester in 1998 in its British Premiere and in July 2001 he again appeared as Freddy when Song of Singapore opened at The Mayfair Theatre in London's West End.

The Elio Pace Band (which he formed in 1993) has headlined at many venues performing his own material and the band was twice featured on Gloria Hunniford's Upstaged (BBC Radio 2) sharing the bill with Neil Sedaka. The band has become a corporate event favourite and has provided musical entertainment for many companies including Warner Bros., Disney, Vodafone, Sotheby's, Manchester United Football Club, UNICEF and Hello and OK magazines. The band were also invited to play for Hollywood actress Sandra Bullock's 30th birthday party. February 2002 saw the release of The Elio Pace Band's Come And Get It, an album featuring his covers of classic songs originally recorded by some of his favourite artists and also including three of his own compositions. The album has a special guest appearance James Burton, guitarist for Elvis Presley. Pace's version of Two More Bottles of Wine, taken from the album, was featured by Sir Terry Wogan on his BBC Radio 2 breakfast show Wake Up To Wogan. Tracks from the album were also featured on Desmond Carrington's All Time Greats, also on Radio 2.

In 2004 he was musical director for an eight-week tour of Dancing in the Streets, a Motown musical revue starring Martha Reeves.

In February 2004 he joined the Shakin' Stevens band as piano-player and backing vocalist. As well as a one-off performance at Frankfurt's Opera House that month, he travelled with Stevens to Denmark in July 2004 to play at the Langelands Festival.

In June 2004 he was invited by Suzi Quatro to become a regular member of her band and in February 2005 Pace completed a three-week, fifteen date tour of Australia with Quatro.

June 2005 – played piano on a new album by Katrina Leskanich and accompanied her on a string of live appearances around the UK.

September 2005 – appeared as Ronnie Corbett's special guest in his only live stand-up performance of the year as part of the Dublin Bulmers Comedy Festival. Also in September 2005, The Elio Pace Band was invited to perform at Bill Kenwright's 60th Birthday party in Mayfair, London during which Pace duetted with Kiki Dee on Don't Go Breaking My Heart.

In 2005, The Shakin' Stevens band (with Pace on piano) performed twice at the Shepherd's Bush Empire, won the final of ITV's Hit Me, Baby, One More Time, reached No.20 in the UK Singles chart and appeared on Top of the Pops, travelled to Denmark and the Faroe Islands and completed a four-week UK tour. In early 2006, Pace completed recording sessions on Now Listen, Shaky's first studio album for thirteen years.

In August 2006, Pace appeared on the soundtrack of the movie Severance singing a song written by Christian Henson and Caroline Lost called Summertimin' which features over the closing credits of the film. In May 2007 the soundtrack was nominated for an Ivor Novello Award.

From September 2006 to December 2009, Pace toured with Grammy Award winning, Albert Lee and his band, Hogan's Heroes, producing their critically acclaimed studio album Like This which features Can Your Grandpa Rock And Roll Like This written by Pace with Matt Daniel-Baker especially for Lee.

May 2009 – release of Pace's new album A Seat at My Table featuring 12 of his own songs. The album features special guest appearances by Albert Lee and Elvis Presley's bass player, Jerry Scheff.

In November 2009, at the request of Sir Terry Wogan, Pace featured on the Bandaged Together CD in aid of BBC Children in Need with his version of a long-forgotten Elvis Presley movie song, "Confidence".

December 2009 not only saw Pace's Christmas single, "What A Day", playlisted by BBC Radio 2 and the whole of the BBC Local Radio Network, it also brought the announcement that Pace is to be musical director and house band for Sir Terry Wogan's new live Radio 2 show, Weekend Wogan.

In January 2010, Pace completed an eleven-date UK tour with his eleven-piece band to promote his new album.

As of June 2014, Elio Pace was touring the UK and Ireland with his 'Elio Pace Plays the Billy Joel Songbook' show. (www.eliopace.com) Pace, a longtime Joel fan, presents a 3-hour show featuring almost 40 Billy Joel songs, all played faithful to the original arrangements. In 2013 Pace was invited to New York to appear with members of Joel's original touring band. August 2014 saw him returning to the states for more concerts with Joel's original line-up. A live CD from this show, Long Long Time - The Sigma Reunion Live in New York City, was released in 2022.

For the 2015 Ashes series, Pace rewrote a rendition of Billy Joel's hit We Didn't Start the Fire that features the Sky Sports pundits.

Pace's concert film, The Billy Joel Songbook Live, won a prestigious award at The 17th Annual Independent Music Awards for 'Best Overall Long Form Music Video' in New York City!

== Discography ==
- Long Long Time - The Sigma Reunion Live in New York City (CD 2022)
- Elio Pace presents Elvis Presley (Double CD and DVD 2019)
- The Billy Joel Songbook Live (Double CD and DVD 2018)
- A Seat at My Table – Reissue with 3 bonus tracks (album 2011)
- "Got The Bug Back" – Remix (single 2011)
- A Seat at My Table (album 2009)
- "What A Day" (single 2006)
- Come and Get It (album 2002)
