= Right Here (Shane Filan album) =

Studio album by Shane Filan
- Released: 25 September 2015
- Recorded: 2013–2015
- Genre: Pop
- Label: East West
- Producers: Jon Maguire, Jacob Attwooll, Cutfather, Tre Jean-Marie, Kay, Alex Davies, Durn

Shane Filan chronology
You and Me (2013)	Right Here (2015)	Love Always (2017)

Singles from Right Here
- 1. "Me and the Moon" Released: 10 August 2015

Professional ratings
Review scores
Source	Rating
Mancunion	6/10 stars
Renowned for Sound	4.5/5 stars

Right Here is the second studio album by Irish singer-songwriter Shane Filan. The album was released on 25 September 2015 by East West Records. The album reached number one in Ireland.

== Background ==
In 2013, Filan released his debut studio album, You and Me, through Capitol Records. In June 2015, it was reported that he had signed a recording contract with Warner Music.

== Singles ==
"Me and the Moon" was released as the album's first single on 10 August 2015. Filan has said of the song; "What I love about it is that it has a universal meaning. It's about losing someone you love, but it could be that you've lost a relationship, or someone has died, or you could be miles away from your loved ones on the other side of the world. I can really relate to it in that sense."

== Track listing ==
No.	Title	Writer(s)	Producer(s)	Length
1.	"Me and the Moon"	Jacob Attwooll, Paddy Dalton, Jordan Luppi, Jon Maguire	Jacob Attwooll, Jon Maguire	3:35
2.	"I Could Be" (duet with Nadine Coyle)	Shane Filan, Engelina Larsen, Kasper Larsen, Mich Hansen, Martin Hoberg Hedegaard, Sharon Vaughn	Cutfather, Kay	2:57
3.	"Right Here"	Filan, Alex Davies, Danny Shah, Julian Emery	Davies, Maguire	3:39
4.	"Beautiful to Me"	Maguire, Jon Lilygreen, Nathan Towell	Maguire	3:34
5.	"Your Love Carries Me"	Don Mescall, Steve Robson	Maguire	3:10
6.	"Better Off a Fool"	Filan, Daniel Durn, Katrine Klith Andersen, Hansen, Vaughn	Cutfather, Durn	3:24
7.	"Worst Kind of Love"	Tre Jean-Marie, Karen Poole	Jean-Marie	3:04
8.	"I Can't Get Over You"	Filan, E. Larsen, K. Larsen, Hansen, Vaughn	Cutfather, Kay	3:26
9.	"Effortlessly You"	Filan, Jez Ashurst, Emily Philips, Emma Rohan	Ashurst	3:37
10.	"All My Love"	Filan, Rohan, Ashurst	Ashurst	3:26

== Charts ==
Chart (2015)	Peak position
Irish Albums (IRMA)	1
Scottish Albums (Official Charts)	7
UK Albums (Official Charts)	11
