= Fin (band) =

- Origin: South West London, England
- Genres: Rock, alternative rock,
- Years active: 2011–present
- Labels: Artisan
- Website: www.finofficial.com

Fin (stylised as fiN) is an English rock band formed in South West London, Surrey, in 2011. The band consists of Luke Joyce (vocals/guitar), Jonny Garner (guitar), Kerry Lambert (bass), and Simon Harding (drums). Fin released their debut, "The Artisan"/"It Changes Everything" — a double a-side single — in October 2011. They self-recorded their debut album Life Is Wasted on the Living and released it digitally on 25 March 2013. The album was mixed by Adrian Bushby Foo Fighters, Muse. Originally planned for release on six 7" singles, they stopped after the first four. They have been vocal about their DIY approach and have received much praise for this and their ambition

== Touring ==
In late 2011, Fin toured the UK and Europe with Incubus. The band has also Toured with The Kooks, Feeder, Howler and most recently supported Muse at The O2 Arena.

== Record label ==
Artisan Records was founded in 2011 by Fin in order to self-release the band's 7 Inch singles and debut album Life Is Wasted on the Living.

== Press ==
Fin were The Guardian's band of the week. Evening Standard wrote a review on the band's single release at Bush Hall, and The Digital Fix said "Fin are born for the live arena". Clash ran a piece on the band and their DIY approach to music.

== Discography ==
=== Albums ===
- Life Is Wasted on the Living, digital (2013, Artisan)

=== Singles ===
- "The Artisan" b/w "It Changes Everything" 7" (2011, Artisan)
- "Everybody Dies Alone" b/w "Rapture" 7" (2011, Artisan)
- "Twenty Three" b/w "Eve" 7" (2012, Artisan)
- "Life Is Wasted on the Living" b/w "Lucky You" 7" (2012, Artisan)
