= Charlotte Egerton, Countess of Bridgewater =

British noblewoman (1763–1849)

Charlotte Egerton
- Countess of Bridgewater
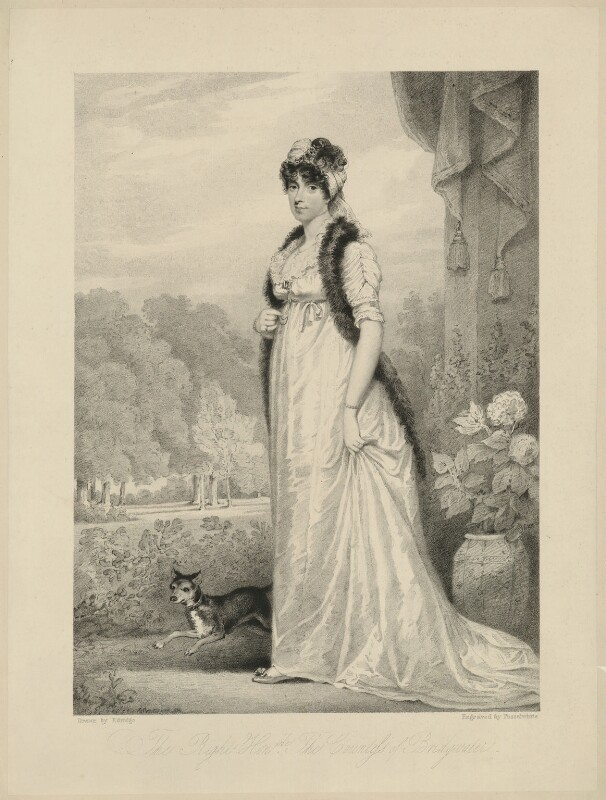
- 1805 engraving of Charlotte Egerton by James Posselwhite (after Henry Edridge)
- Born: Charlotte Catherine Anne Haynes; 20 November 1763
- Died: 11 February 1849 (aged 85); Ashridge, Hertfordshire
- Buried: Church of St Peter and St Paul, Little Gaddesden
- Noble family: Egerton family
- Spouse: John Egerton, 7th Earl of Bridgewater (m. 1783; died 1823)
- Father: Samuel Haynes
- Mother: Elizabeth Haynes
- Memorials: Rectory Lane Cemetery, Berkhamsted, Hertfordshire

Charlotte Catherine Anne, Countess of Bridgewater (20 November 1763 – 11 February 1849), née Charlotte Haynes, was a British noblewoman. She was known for her philanthropic and charitable acts, and supported numerous educational and religious causes. She was responsible for the laying out of the ornamental gardens around her family home at Ashridge in Hertfordshire.

Charlotte married John Egerton, 7th Earl of Bridgewater of the Egerton family in 1783 and from 1803 assumed the title Countess of Bridgewater through her marriage. After the death of her husband, she lived for a further 26 years as a dowager.

== Early life ==
Charlotte Catherine Anne Haynes was born on 20 November 1763. She was the daughter of Samuel Haynes (1789-1802) and Elizabeth. Her father was the son of Rev Hopton Haynes and Margaret Haynes, rector of Elmsett, Suffolk.

== Marriage to the Earl of Bridgewater ==
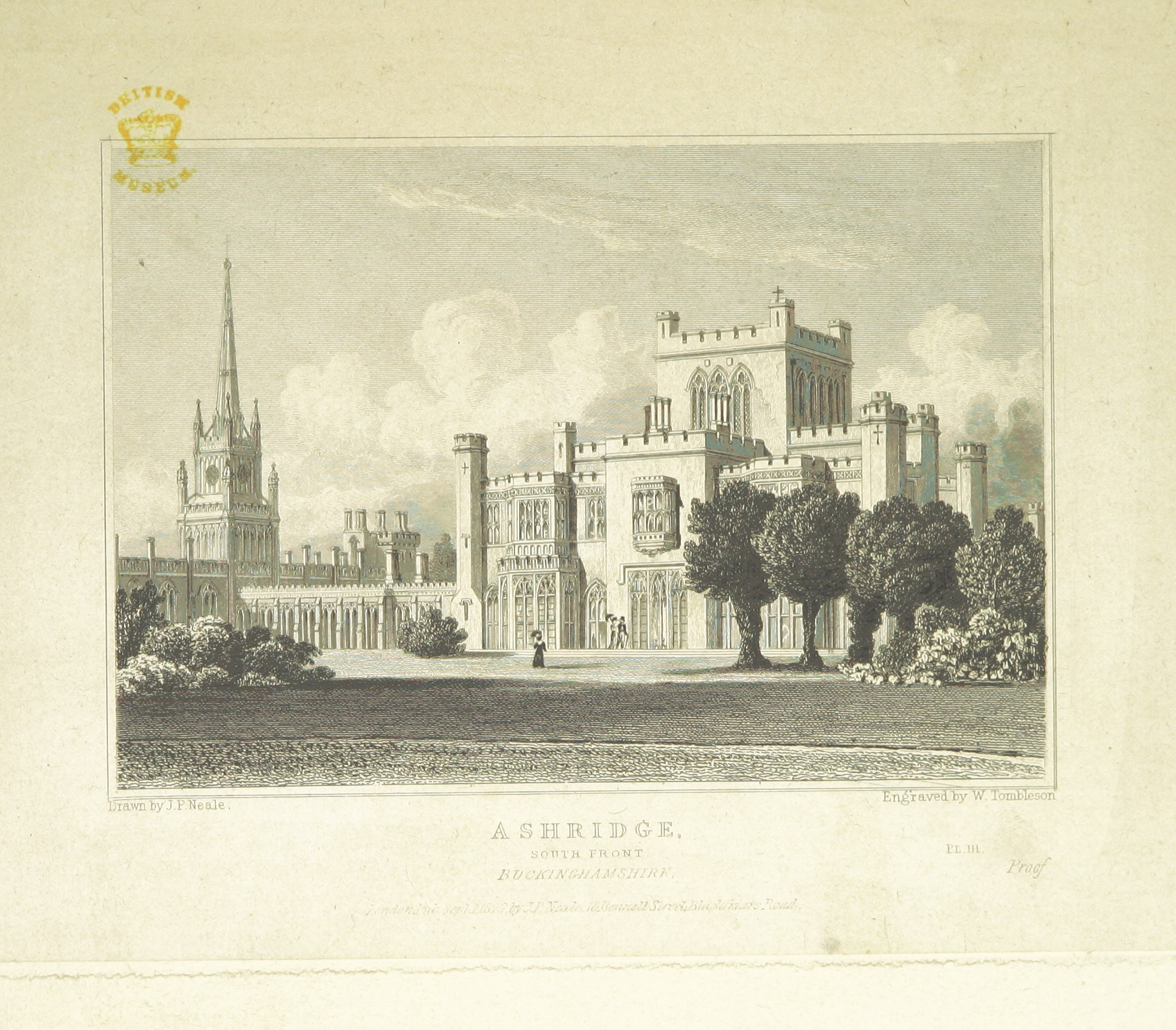
1829 engraving of Ashridge by John Preston Neale

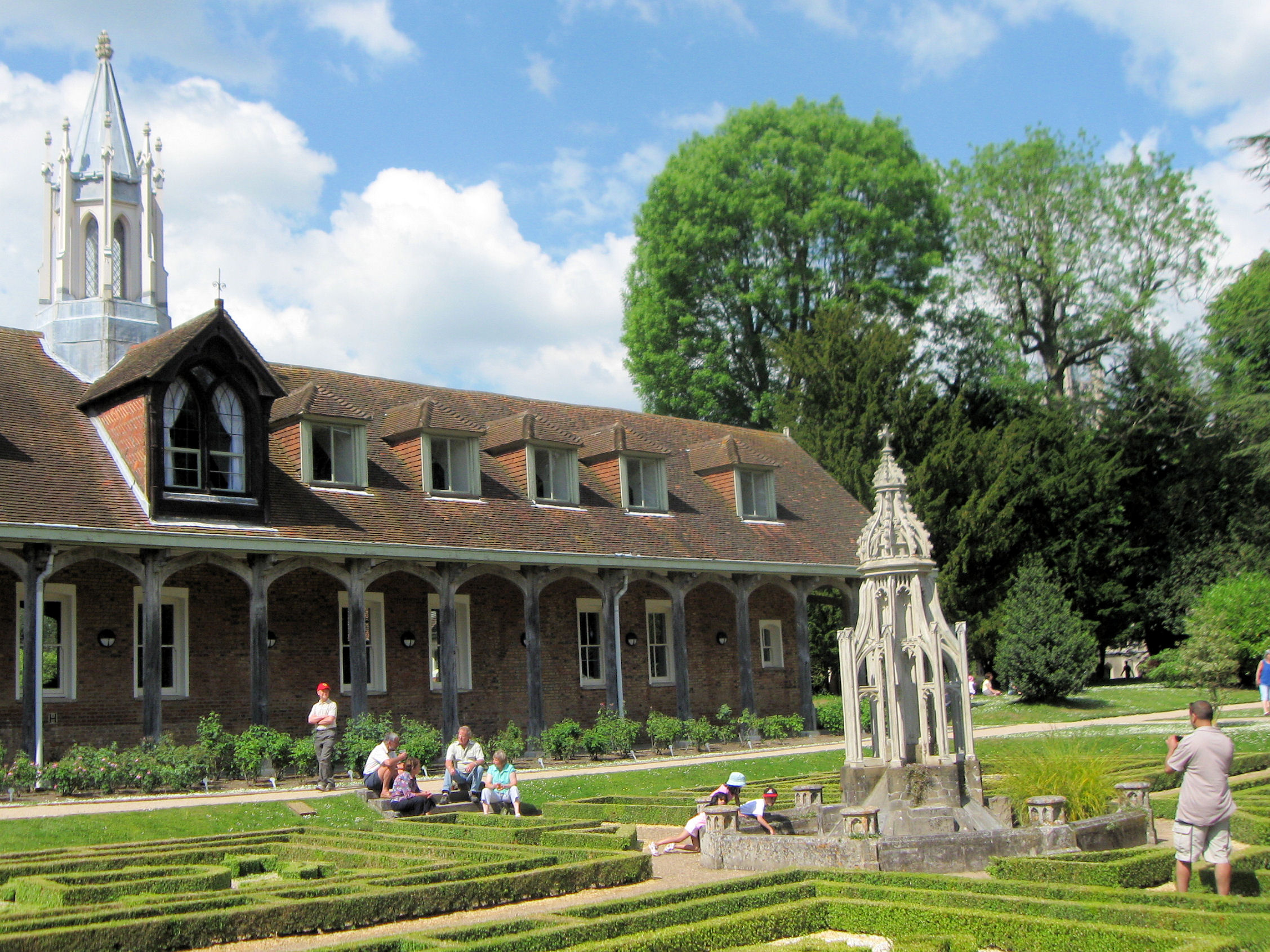
The Monks' Garden at Ashridge House, conceived by the Countess in 1813

Charlotte Haynes married General John Egerton on 14 January 1783 at 58 Welbeck Street in London. Egerton was the eldest son of the Right Reverend John Egerton, Bishop of Durham and Lady Anne Sophia Grey and a prominent member of the Egerton family. As well as being a serving army officer, Egerton was serving as MP for Brackley in Northamptonshire.

On 8 March 1803, John Egerton's first cousin once removed, Francis Egerton, 3rd Duke of Bridgewater and 6th Earl of Bridgewater, died unmarried and without issue. The ducal title became extinct, but the Earldom of Bridgewater passed to John Egerton, who became the 7th Earl. Correspondingly, Charlotte assumed the title of Countess of Bridgewater. The late duke, known as the "Canal Duke", had amassed a fortune with his canal building in the North of England, and John and Charlotte Egerton were beneficiaries of that fortune.

=== Ashridge ===
Lord and Lady Bridgewater went to live at the Egerton family seat, Ashridge in Hertfordshire. The estate had been in the family since 1604. Prior to his death, the 3rd Duke, Lord Egerton's predecessor, had begun to demolish the medieval Ashridge Priory in order to build a new country house. The 7th Earl of Bridgewater commissioned the architect James Wyatt to build a new Ashridge House. Charlotte laid the foundation stone for the new house on 25 October 1808, the 48th anniversary of the accession of George III of Great Britain. The ceremony is commemorated by a brass plaque by the main entrance. In 1813, part-way through the construction works, Wyatt died, and the project was completed the following year by his nephew Jeffry Wyatt (later known as Sir Jeffry Wyatville). Ashridge House is highly regarded today as one of the finest examples of early Gothic Revival architecture and is now a Grade I listed building.

The Countess took a particular interest in the horticultural aspects of the new estate and took a leading role in the laying out of the gardens at Ashridge. She commissioned the noted landscape gardener Humphrey Repton, and they formed a friendship on his many visits to the estate. Repton presented many ideas in his Red Book for the estate in 1813, including a rosarie (or rosarium) and a "Monks' Garden" commemorating Ashridge's monastic heritage with a layout of grave-shaped flower beds. Charlotte approved many of his designs, but also had her own ideas for the estate and made alterations to his proposals. Writing in 1824, the chaplain to the Earl of Bridgewater, Rev Henry Todd, noted that "the profusion of flowers which abound here, as the walks and conservatories together with the elegance of their arrangement, sufficiently indicates the care and attention bestowed by the Countess of Bridgewater upon her delightful pursuits of the garden." The rosarie and the Monks' Garden are still visible at Ashridge today.

In addition to Ashridge, Lady Bridgewater and her husband also owned a London property at 7 Grosvenor Square, which they renovated with the assistance of Wyatville. In 1826, the widowed Charlotte sold the house and purchased a smaller property in the same square, at No. 20.

=== Death of the 7th Earl ===
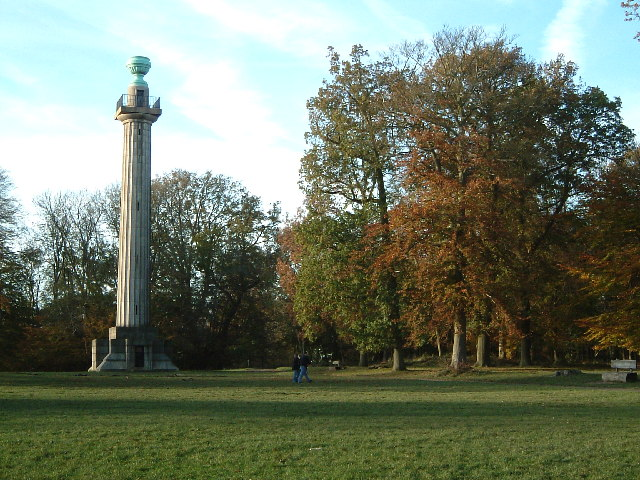
Charlotte approved the erection of the Bridgewater Monument at Ashridge in 1832 after some disagreement

The 7th Earl of Bridgewater died in October 1823, aged 70. He had no children, and left part of his estate to Charlotte. The dowager countess was aged 60 at the time of her husband's death, and outlived him by 26 years. She continued to live at the family seat at Ashridge.

On the death in 1829 of her brother-in-law, Francis Egerton, 8th Earl of Bridgewater, she inherited £5719.18s.6d. in dividends from shares in the family's shares in the Bridgewater Canal. The 8th Earl's will also made provision for a monument to be erected to his predecessor, the "Canal Duke". Charlotte objected to the erection of an obelisk, which she considered to be poor taste. Sir Jeffry Wyattville, the architect who completed Ashridge House, was again appointed, and in response to the countess's objections, he designed the monument as a Neoclassical Doric column. At Charlotte's behest, the Bridgewater Monument was sited some distance from Ashridge House so as not to be seen. A brass plaque inside the monument records that it was erected "with the approbation of Charlotte C. Anne, Countess of Bridgewater".

With the death of the 8th Earl, the Bridgwater title became extinct.

== Charitable work ==
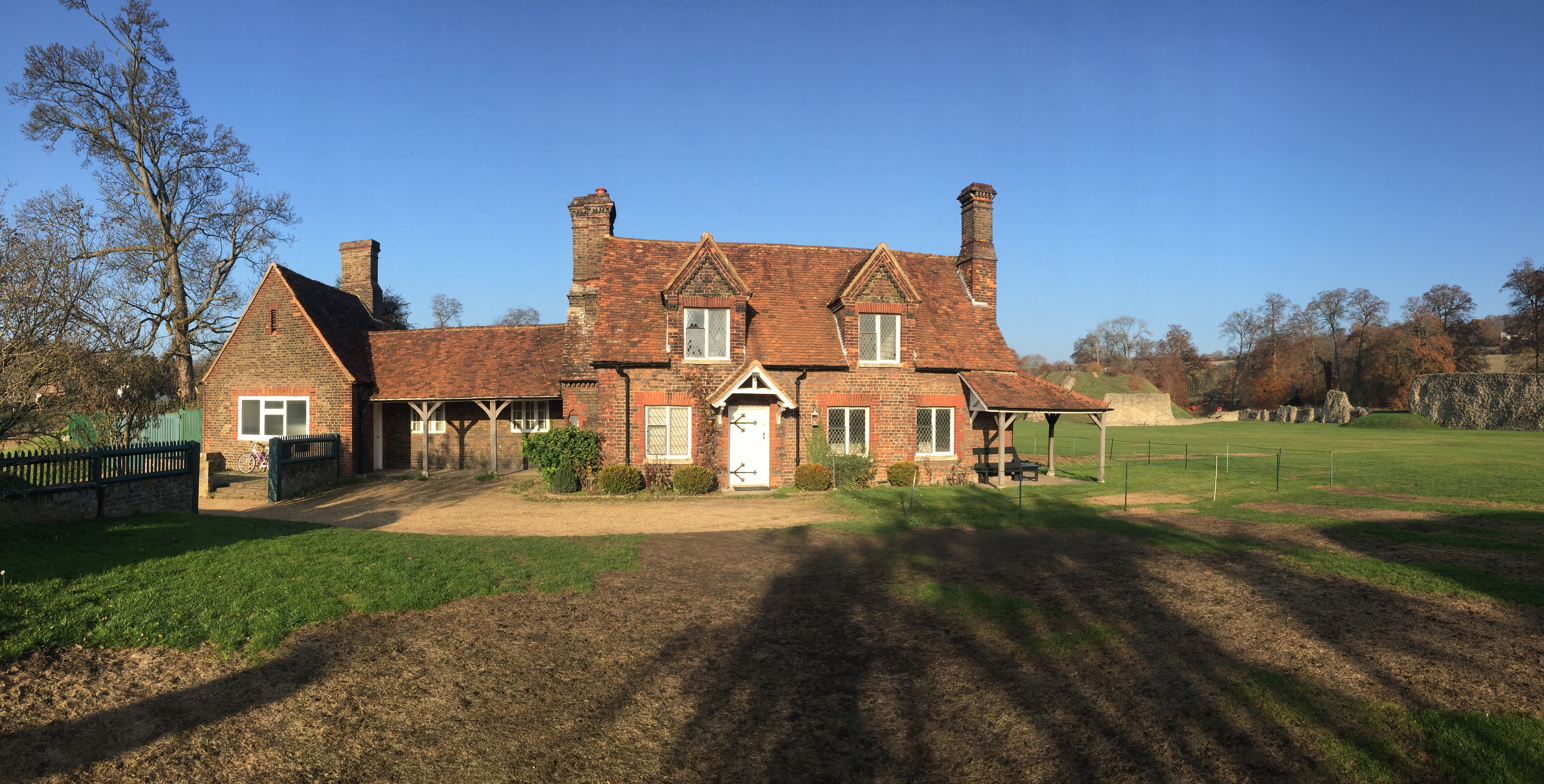
The Keeper's Lodge at Berkhamsted Castle, thought to be the location of the Countess of Bridgewater's soup kitchen, c.1841-79

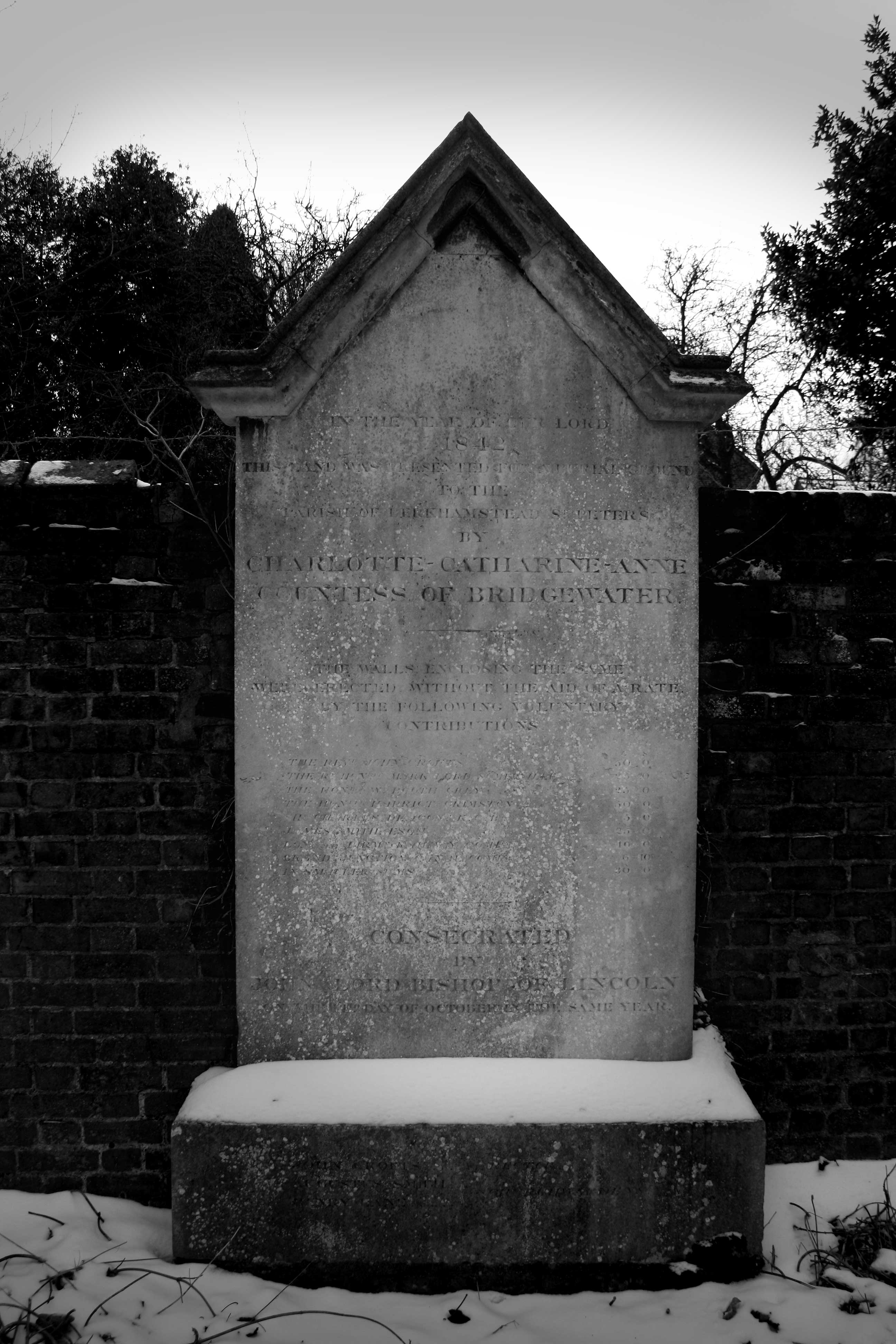
Berkhamsted cemetery commemoration stone

The Countess was known for her benevolence, and in her widowhood acted as benefactor to a number of charitable causes.

Many of her donations were to fund local schools in towns on Bridgewater Estate lands across the country. On 22 March 1844 she founded The Countess of Bridgewater's Endowment of Winston School in support of the parochial school in Winston, County Durham. The Countess also donated £3,300 towards the restoration of St Mary's Church, Ellesmere in Shropshire and also funded the construction of the National school in Ellesmere as well as the Old Town Hall there. Closer to Ashridge, in Ivinghoe, Buckinghamshire, she endowed a National school there in 1865.

Charlotte exhibited concern for the poor; agricultural workers on the Bridgewater lands had been made destitute during the winter months were unable to feed themselves and their families, and sometime around 1841 the Countess established a soup kitchen within the ruins of Berkhamsted Castle. Contemporary accounts in the Bucks Herald describe the distribution of soup and bread to hundreds of poor people from a house in the castle grounds, thought to be the 19th-century keeper's lodge which still stands today.

The Countess was a dedicated benefactor to the Church of England. In 1835 she gave £2,000 to pay for the construction of a church at Tilstock in Whitchurch, Shropshire, and the following year she donated £8,000 to build a church in Dodington, also in Whitchurch. In 1842, she purchased a mansion in Berkhamsted, Egerton House, and donated part of the land to the nearby Parish Church of St Peter for use as a detached cemetery. A foundation stone in Rectory Lane Cemetery commemorates the donation of the Countess and the consecration of the burial ground by John Kaye, Bishop of Lincoln, on 11 October 1842. In 1844, the Countess funded the construction of a chapel of ease in the village of Caldwell, North Yorkshire, on Bridgewater Estate lands. A commemorative board inside the chapel of St. Hilda records the Countess of Bridgewater's donation in 1844 of £1526.14s 4d. The chapel closed to public worship in 2016.

== Death and legacy ==
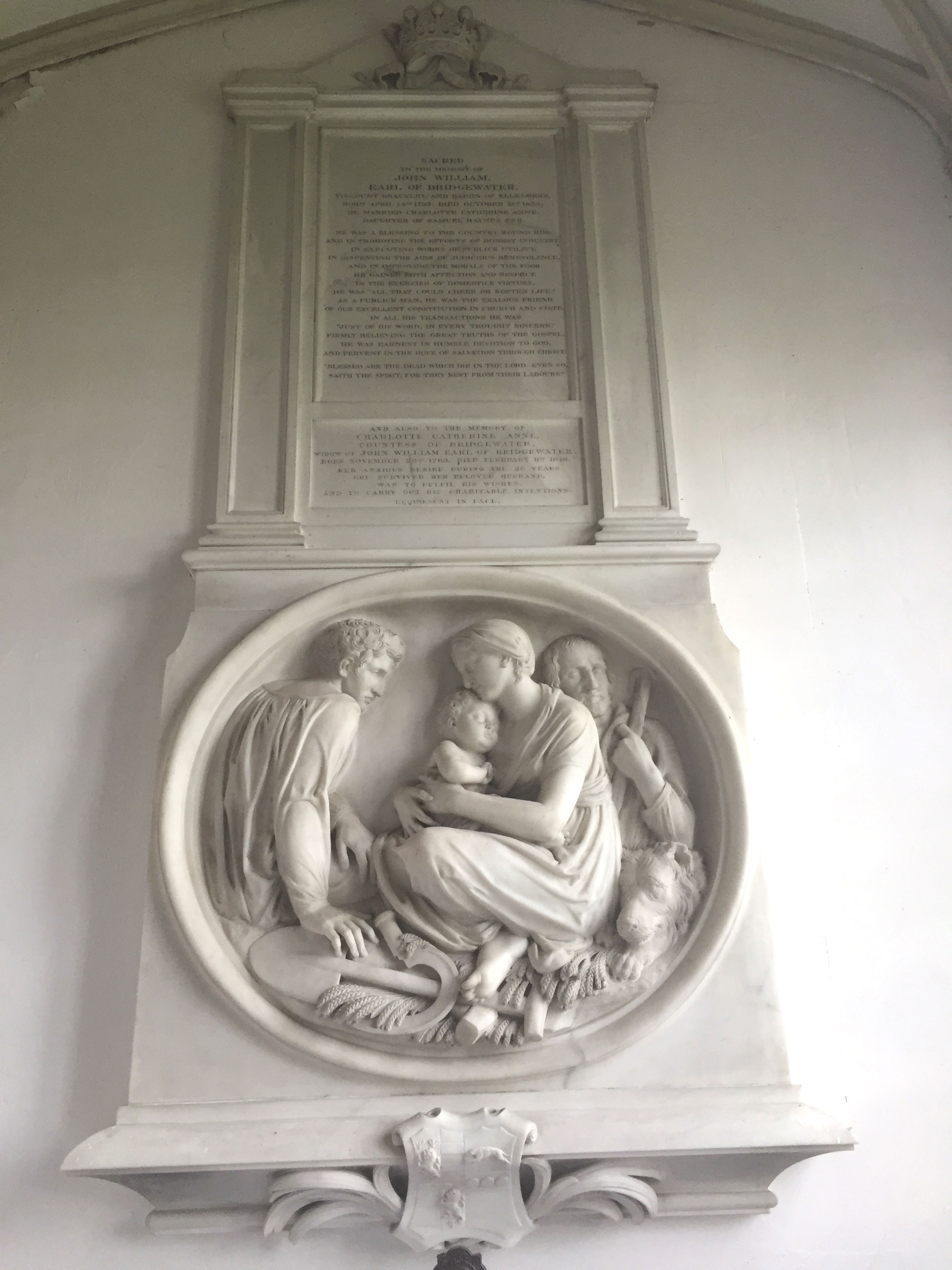
7th Earl of Bridgewater Memorial, Little Gaddesden

Charlotte died suddenly on 11 February 1849 whilst sitting in her chair at Ashridge, aged 86. Her published obituary in The Gentleman's Magazine stated that "She was a very pious and benevolent person, and many recipients of her charity will have to bewail her loss." She was buried on 22 February 1849 in the Egerton Family vault in the Church of St Peter and St Paul in Little Gaddesden, on the Ashridge Estate. A marble wall monument designed by Richard Westmacott commemorates the 7th Earl and a dedication to the Countess:

"And also to the memory of Charlotte Catherine Anne, widow of John William, Earl of Bridgewater, Born November 20th 1763, died February 11th 1840.
Her anxious desire during the 26 years she survived her beloved husband, was to fulfil his wishes, and to carry out his charitable intentions."

— Memorial in St Peter and St Paul, Little Gaddesden

In accordance with the will of her late husband, the Countess left the bulk of the Bridgewater estate to John Egerton, Viscount Alford, the eldest son of John Cust, 1st Earl Brownlow. Lord Alford also inherited the right to bear the Egerton family arms. Among other beneficiaries, Charlotte bequeathed £2000 to the Society for Promoting Christian Knowledge.

Few portraits survive of Charlotte. A pencil and chalk portrait of the Countess standing in a landscape with her dog was drawn by Henry Edridge in around 1805 and is now in the National Trust's collection at Tatton Hall, Cheshire. A stipple engraving was made of the portrait by James Posselwhite, now in the collection of the National Portrait Gallery, London, and a copy hangs in Belton House, Lincolnshire. Also in the Tatton Collection is a portrait miniature of Charlotte painted by Richard Cosway in watercolour on ivory.
