= Ashridge =

National Trust country estate in England

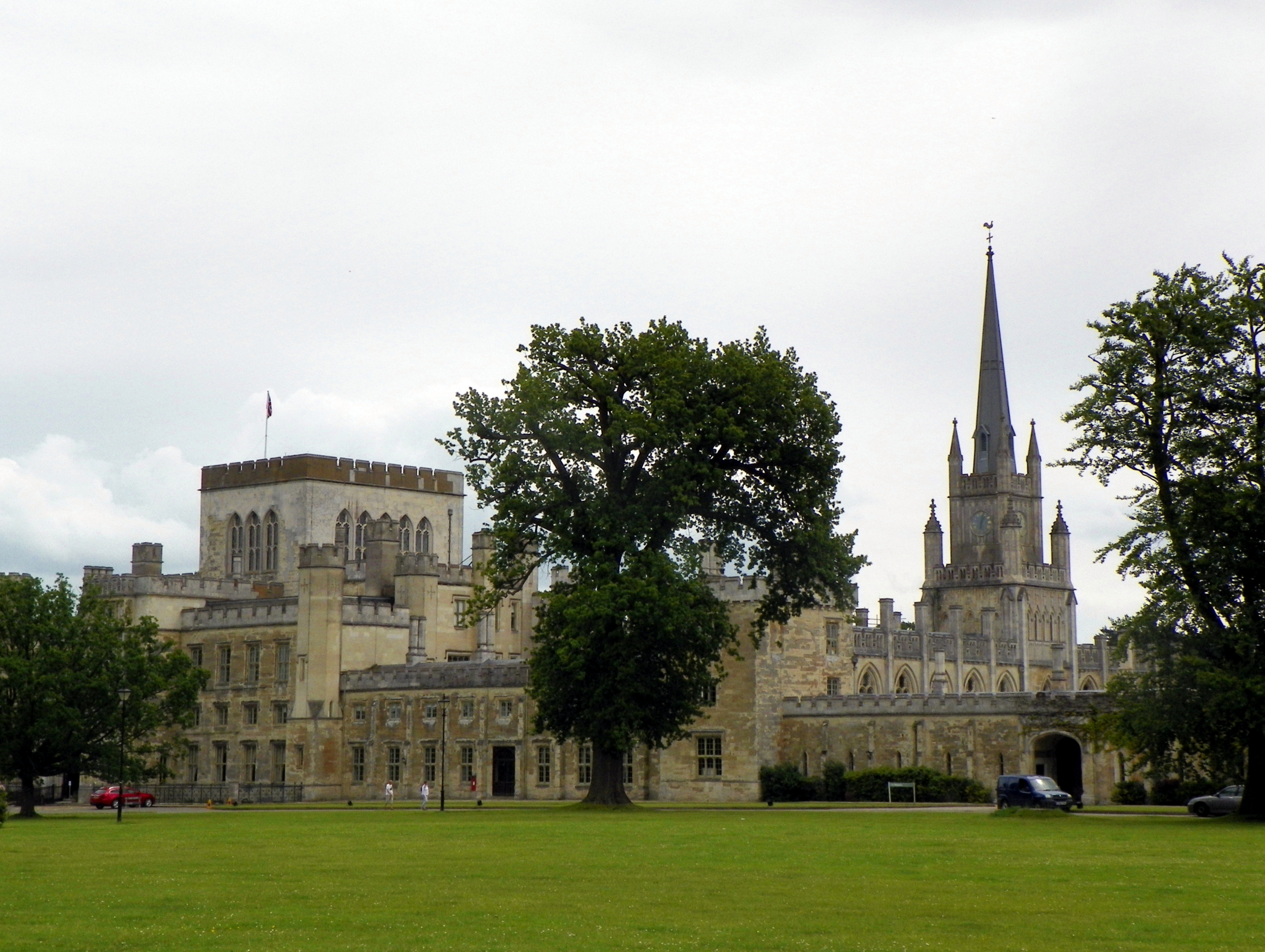
- Ashridge house

- Location within Hertfordshire
- 51°47′59″N 0°33′34″W
- Type: Country house and estate
- Location: Little Gaddesden
- OS grid reference: SP975135

History
- Built: 1808–1814

Site notes
- Area: Hertfordshire
- Owner: House: Private; Estate: National Trust

Listed Building – Grade I
- Official name: Ashridge House, including raised terrace, walls and steps to east and south, and iron railings to north
- Designated: 14 May 1952
- Reference no.: 1348442

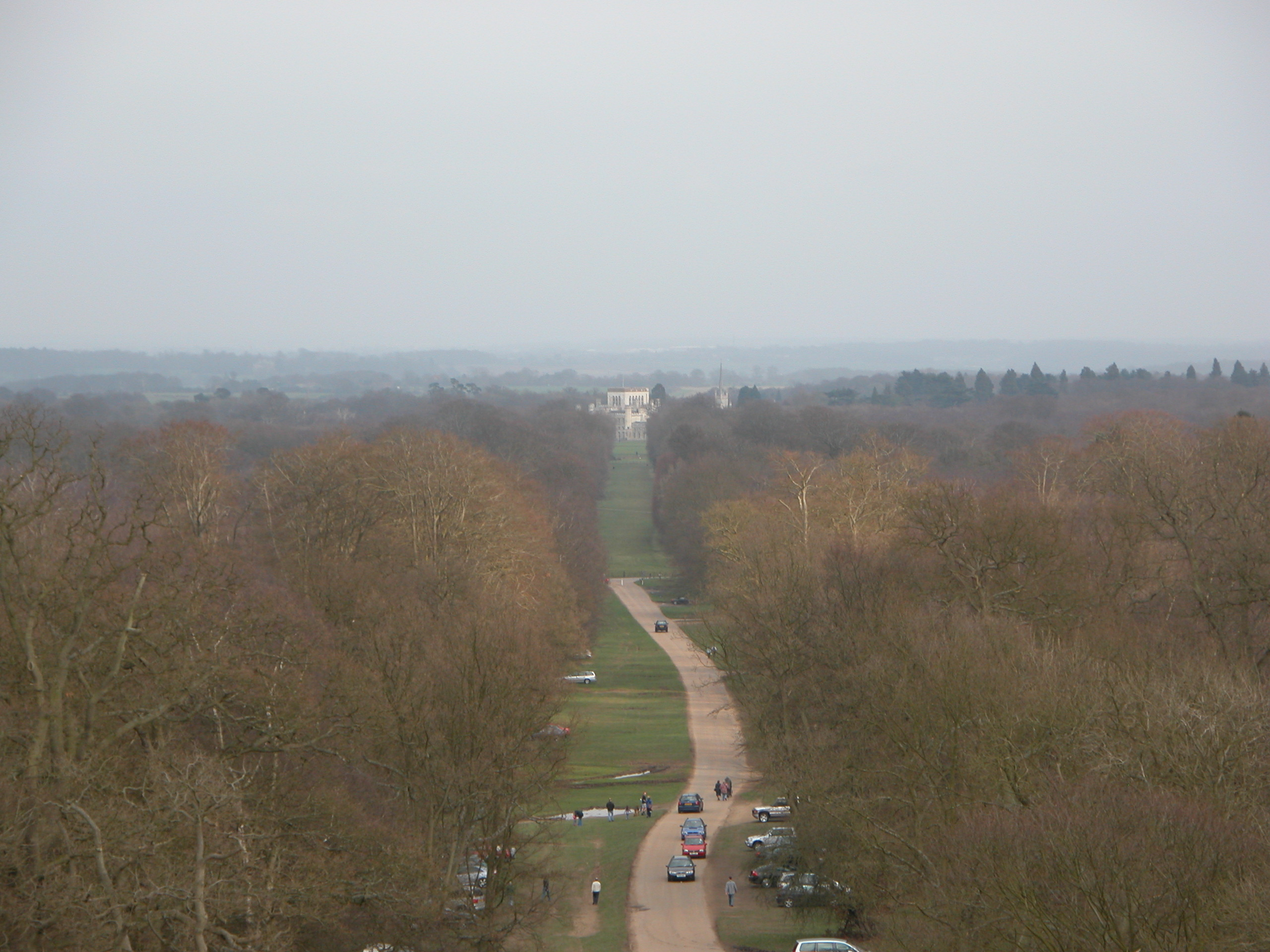
View from Bridgewater Monument to the house

Ashridge is a country estate and stately home in Hertfordshire, England. It is situated in the Chiltern Hills, an Area of Outstanding Natural Beauty, about 2 miles (3.2 km) north of Berkhamsted and 23 miles (37 km) north west of London. The estate comprises 5,000 acres (20 km^{2}) of woodlands (known as Ashridge Forest), commons and chalk downland which supports a variety of wildlife.

Today, Ashridge is home to Hult Ashridge, Hult International Business School's executive education programme. The estate is currently owned by the National Trust.

== History ==
=== Ashridge Priory ===
In mediæval times, Ashridge was the location of Ashridge Priory, a college of the monastic order of Bonhommes founded in 1283 by Edmund, 2nd Earl of Cornwall, whose palace was at nearby Berkhamsted Castle. At the dissolution of the monasteries the priory was surrendered to the crown and King Henry VIII used it to house his children, namely Prince Edward and the Princesses Mary and Elizabeth. Eventually he bequeathed the property to his daughter Elizabeth. The priory church was demolished during the reign of Elizabeth I.

=== The Egerton family ===
In 1604, the estate became the property of Sir Thomas Egerton. Egerton's son, John Egerton, was created 1st Earl of Bridgewater on 27 May 1617. In 1800, redevelopment of the estate as the Bridgewater residence was begun by Francis Egerton, 3rd Duke of Bridgewater. The Duke demolished most of the Priory and after his death, the present house was constructed between 1808 and 1814 by John Egerton, 7th Earl of Bridgewater. The 3rd Duke of Bridgewater was buried in the Egerton family vault in Little Gaddesden Church, close to Ashridge.

In 1848, the estate passed to the Earls Brownlow, another strand of the Egerton family, and then in 1921 it was split, with the land passing to the National Trust, while the house and garden was acquired by speculators.

=== Conservative Staff College ===
In 1928, Urban Hanlon Broughton purchased the house as a gift for the Conservative Party, intended to commemorate Bonar Law. In July 1929, Ashridge opened by Stanley Baldwin as a College under the governance of the Bonar Law Memorial Trust (BLMT). The BLMT was charged by its Founding Deed to pursue the following goals, namely:

(a) honouring the memory of a great statesman,

(b) the preservation of the house and grounds as an historic building,

(c) to create an educational centre ...

(d) to train lecturers, speakers and writers to further the study of the subjects outlined above

(e) ... provide lectures and/or discussions on these subjects open to the public or for those who had paid fees to attend,

(f) ... provide a supporting staff,

(g) to allow boarding by those attending the lectures and discussions.

For the next fifteen years the college, the full title of which was the Bonar Law Memorial College, Ashridge was to act as a school for Conservative intellectuals creating, in their own words, 'Conservative Fabians', and as a 'College of Citizenship' for 'the general education of the electorate'. Associated with the College were regional or county circles or clubs, such the Ashridge Dining Club in London; their activities were reported by The Ashridge Journal. In 1954, its Deed of Foundation was changed by Act of Parliament, and Ashridge was 're-founded' as an educational charity. In 1959, it became a Management College, which it remains today.

=== Hult International Business School ===
In 1959, Ashridge College was re-launched to provide management training, and was named Ashridge Business School. In 2015, Ashridge Business School operationally merged with Hult International Business School, an American business school with campuses in seven cities around the world. As part of the merger, Ashridge Business School changed its name to Ashridge Executive Education, later Hult Ashridge.

== Estate ==
=== Ashridge House ===
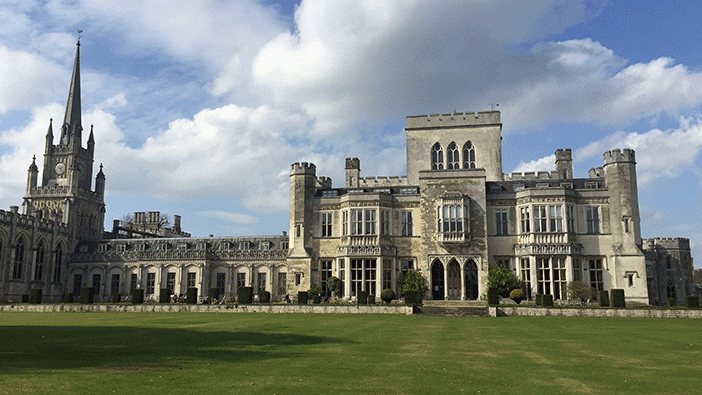
Ashridge is a noted example of early Gothic Revival architecture and features decorative crenellations

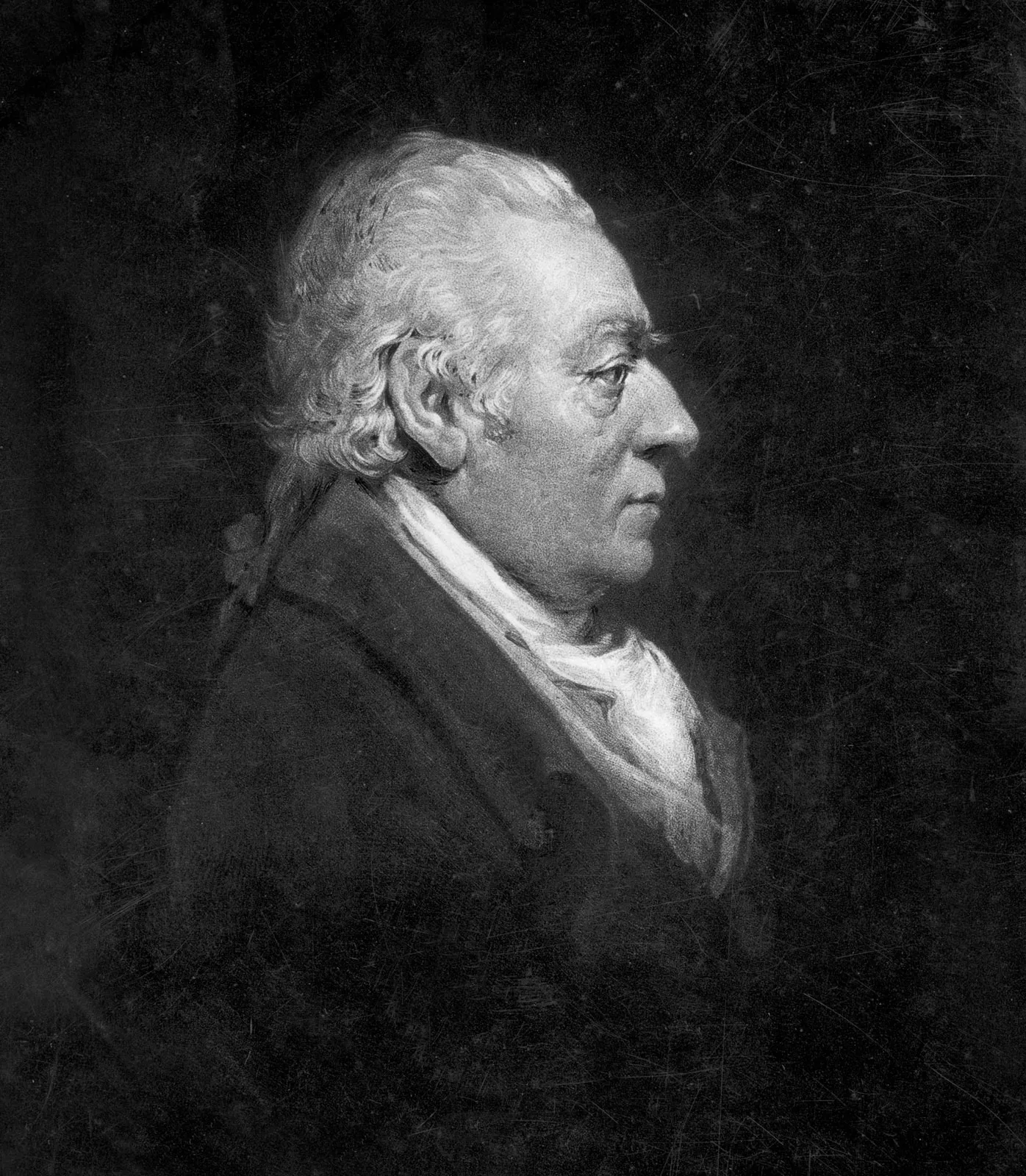
Architect James Wyatt

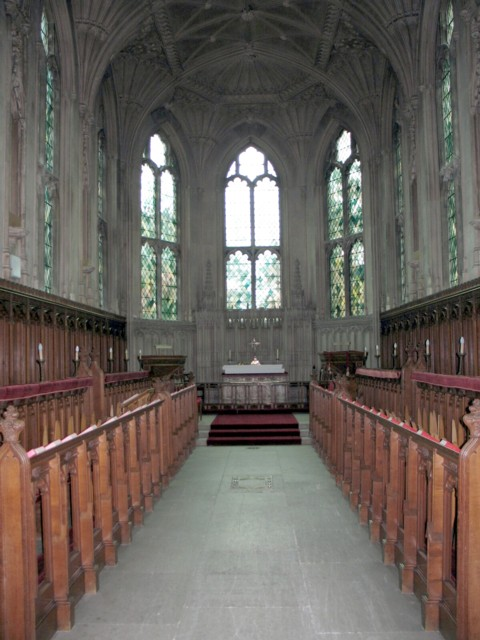
Ashridge chapel

Prior to his death in the early 1800s, the 3rd Duke of Bridgewater had begun to demolish the Medieval Priory buildings in order to build a new country house. His successor, the 7th Earl of Bridgewater commissioned the architect James Wyatt to build his new home, Ashridge House. The foundation stone for the new house was laid by the 7th Earl's wife, Charlotte Catherine Anne, Countess of Bridgewater, on 25 October 1808, the 48th anniversary of the accession of George III of Great Britain. The ceremony is commemorated by a brass plaque by the main entrance.

In 1813, part-way through the construction works, Wyatt died unexpectedly, and the building project was completed the following year by his nephew Jeffry Wyatt (later known as Sir Jeffry Wyatville). The present house is regarded as one of the finest examples of early Gothic Revival architecture and is now a Grade I listed building.

Ashridge house was built on the site of the 13th-century priory building which had been demolished in 1800. Some parts of the old priory were incorporated into the house by James Wyatt, including the undercroft of the monastic refectory, featuring two aisles, seven bays and a rib-vaulted ceiling, which he repurposed as a beer cellar below the dining room and drawing room.

The mansion is built of ashlar faced with Totternhoe stone with a castellated parapet and low-pitched slate roofs. It features a variety of casement windows including pointed arch and ogee lights typical of the early Gothic Revival style. Before his untimely death, James Wyatt completed the north-facing front entrance and the central block, containing the state apartments and western courtyards. Jeffry Wyatt added private apartment blocks at an angle to the main building and an orangery with a turret in 1815–17. The main entrance features a projecting porte-cochère and octagonal turrets, added by Jeffry Wyatt c.1814.

Inside the mansion are a number of richly decorated state rooms; of the interior features, only the hall, the staircase tower and the chapel are Gothic in design. The high staircase hall features a stone stair with iron railing, surrounded by niches containing statues by Sir Richard Westmacott. At the centre of the fan-vaulted ceiling is a large dial connected to the weather vane on the roof which displays the current wind direction. The Brownlow Hall contains a giant frieze of the goddess Venus surrounded by putti with an armorial centrepiece and three early-Twentieth Century murals. Redecoration of the interiors was commissioned by Lady Marian Alford and executed in the neoclassical style in 1855–63 by Sir Matthew Digby Wyatt, including a replica of Guido Reni's Aurora ceiling and aedicular door surrounds. Among the alterations carried out after the conversion of the mansion into a college, the conservatory was altered by Clough Williams-Ellis in 1919 to form a dining-room. The boundary between Hertfordshire and Buckinghamshire originally passed through the dining room, though the house is now entirely in Hertfordshire.

The house incorporates a Gothic Revival Chapel designed by James Wyatt, completed by Jeffry Wyatt in 1817. The most notable exterior feature of the chapel is its spire which was demolished in 1922 by Lord Brownlow as it had become structurally unsound. The spire which can be seen today is in fact a fibreglass replica which was erected in 1969. The chapel interior features a pair of Fourteenth-Century carved doors, fan-vaulted coving supporting a canted panelled ceiling; a set of carved oak choir stalls designed by Jeffry; and an array of Rayonnant lancet windows. The windows were originally fitted with stained glass panels depicting scenes from the Bible; the glass was imported by the 7th Earl from Germany, having been originally designed in the Sixteenth Century for Steinfeld Abbey and Mariawald Abbey. The glass was auctioned off at Sotheby's in 1928 and acquired by the Victoria and Albert Museum. One glass panel featuring the Blessed Virgin was placed in the nearby Church of Ss Peter and Paul at Little Gaddesden; another, depicting St Peter was in Christ Church, Croydon in London. Beneath the chapel is a vaulted medieval wellhouse with a 224-foot (68 m) well.

=== Gardens ===
Outside the house stands the timber-frame and brick Fourteenth-Century Monks' Barn in the Monks' Garden. It was remodelled in 1816 by Jeffry Wyatt who added a covered walkway. In 1884 Mathew Digby Wyatt added the red brick Fern House.

The gardens were laid out from 1813 onwards under the direction of Charlotte Catherine Anne, Countess of Bridgewater, wife of the 7th Earl. She commissioned the noted landscape gardener Humphrey Repton, and they formed a friendship on his many visits to the estate. Repton presented many ideas in his Red Book for the estate in 1813, including a rosarie (or rosarium) and a "Monks' Garden" commemorating Ashridge's monastic heritage with a layout of grave-shaped flower beds. The Countess approved many of his designs, but also had her own ideas for the estate and made alterations to his proposals. Writing in 1824, the chaplain to the Earl of Bridgewater, Rev Henry Todd, noted that "the profusion of flowers which abound here, as the walks and conservatories together with the elegance of their arrangement, sufficiently indicates the care and attention bestowed by the Countess of Bridgewater upon her delightful pursuits of the garden." The rosarie and the Monks' Garden are still visible at Ashridge today.

=== Bridgewater Monument ===
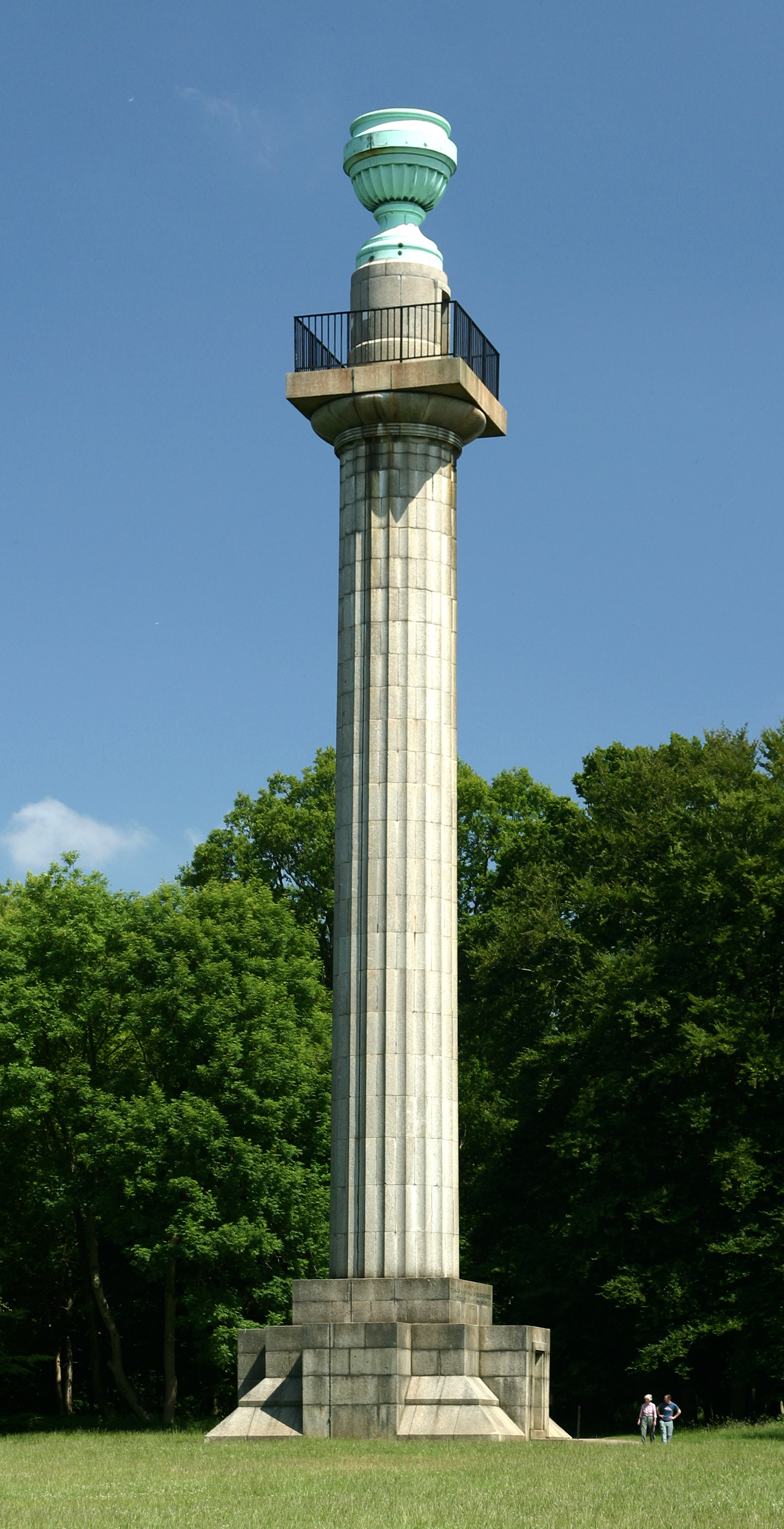
The Bridgewater Monument

The Grade II* listed Bridgewater Monument (grid reference SP970131) is a tower on the Ashridge estate, built in 1832 in memory of Francis Egerton, 3rd Duke of Bridgewater (1736–1803), "the father of inland navigation".

=== Ashridge Commons and Woods ===
Ashridge Commons & Woods (grid reference SP975135) is a 640.1 hectare (1581.7 acre) Biological Site of Special Scientific Interest. The site was notified in 1987 under the Wildlife and Countryside Act 1981 and lies on the Buckinghamshire and Hertfordshire border and is home to much semi-natural vegetation. As well as this, the site has extensive areas of woodland, grass and plantations. Ashridge Woods are also well known for their Bluebell woods.

=== Later developments ===
Part of the estate became Ashridge Golf Club in 1932, and had Henry Cotton as its club professional in the late 1930s, including his most successful year 1937.

During the Second World War, the building and the lawn in front of it was used as a secondary site for Charing Cross Hospital.

The house has housed the Ashridge Executive Education programme, of Hult International Business School, since 1959.

== In popular culture ==
Ashridge Common has been featured many times in film and television series due to its distinction as an area of natural beauty. Scenes for: Maleficent, Plotlands, Sleepy Hollow, Jonathan Creek and Harry Potter and the Goblet of Fire were filmed in Ashridge's Frithsden Beeches wood. Ashridge House, which is now Ashridge Business School, has been featured in films such as The Dirty Dozen. It has also been used as a location for The Crown and Pennyworth, and the Harry Potter TV series.

In early 2023, the English singer-songwriter Sam Smith released a music video for his song I'm Not Here to Make Friends, almost entirely shot in and outside the property.

== Sources ==
- Pevsner, Nikolaus (2002). Cherry, Bridget (ed.). Hertfordshire (2nd ed.). New Haven: Yale University Press. ISBN 9780300096118.
- Sanecki, Kay (1996). Ashridge – A Living History. Phillimore. ISBN 978-1-86077-020-3.
- Way, Dr Twigs (2013). Virgins, Weeders and Queens. History Press. ISBN 978-0-7524-9578-1.
- Williamson, Tom (2020). Humphry Repton : landscape design in an age of revolution. London. ISBN 9781789143003.
