= Caldwell, North Yorkshire =

Village and civil parish in North Yorkshire, England

Coordinates: 54.51609°N 1.75325°W

Caldwell
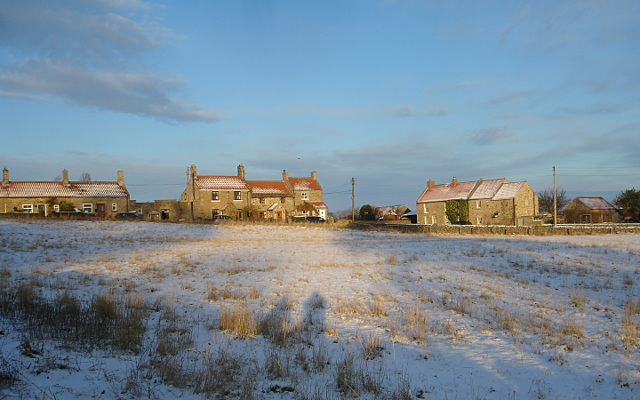
- Houses in Caldwell

- Location within North Yorkshire
- Population: 138 (2011 census)
- OS grid reference: NZ160134
- Civil parish: Caldwell
- Unitary authority: North Yorkshire
- Ceremonial county: North Yorkshire
- Region: Yorkshire and the Humber
- Country: England
- Sovereign state: United Kingdom
- Post town: Richmond
- Postcode district: DL11
- Police: North Yorkshire
- Fire: North Yorkshire
- Ambulance: Yorkshire

Caldwell is a village and civil parish in the county of North Yorkshire, England, close to the border with County Durham and approximately 10 miles west of Darlington. According to the 2011 UK census the parish had a population of 138, increasing from 115 at the 2001 census.

== History ==
The name Caldwell derives from the Old English caldwella meaning 'cold spring'.

Caldwell was mentioned in the Domesday Book in 1096 as being in the hundred of "Land of Count Alan" and the county of Yorkshire, although no population was recorded.

It is recorded in Leland's Itinerary that Caldwell once had a castle. The castle was probably Norman in origin as Leland refers to it as a ruin as early as 1540. It apparently stood very near to the spring in the village, but no other details are known.

Leland had written of the ruined castle at Aldbrough St John and went on to say:

There appere ruines of like buildinges at Cawdewelle village a ii . miles west from Alburcge. Cawdewel is so caullid of a little font, or spring, by the ruines of the olde place, and so rennith into a bekke half a quarter of a mile of. This bekke rennith thens to Alburcg, and a v . miles of into Tese, ripa citer. This bek risith in a marisk about a ii . myle southe west above Caaldwell.

In 1870–72 John Marius Wilson's Imperial Gazetteer of England and Wales described Caldwell as:

"a township in St. John-Stanwick parish, N. R. Yorkshire; on an affluent of the river Tees, 8 miles N of Richmond. Acres, 2,000. Real property, £2,102. Pop., 162. Houses, 34."

== Governance ==
The village lies within the Richmond and Northallerton parliamentary constituency, which is under the control of the Conservative Party. The current Member of Parliament, since the 2015 general election, is Rishi Sunak.

From 1974 to 2023 it was part of the district of Richmondshire, it is now administered by the unitary North Yorkshire Council.

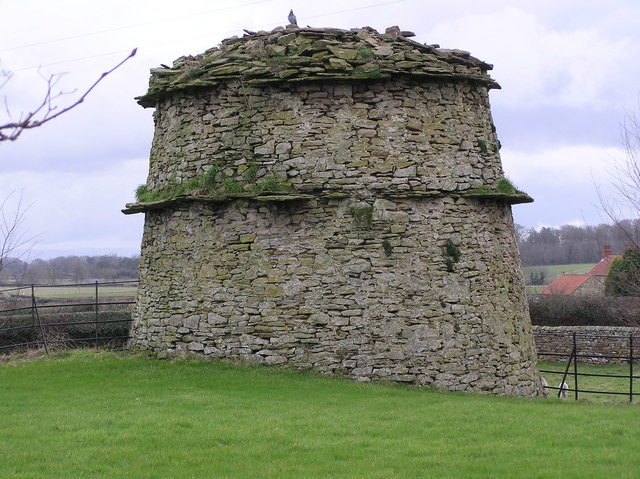
Dovecot in Caldwell

== Community and culture ==
The chapel of St. Hilda, built in 1844, was funded by Charlotte Catherine Anne, Countess of Bridgewater, and was formerly part of the Stanwick St John parish. The village has one public house,The Brownlow Arms.

== See also ==
- Listed buildings in Caldwell, North Yorkshire
