= Bridgewater Monument =

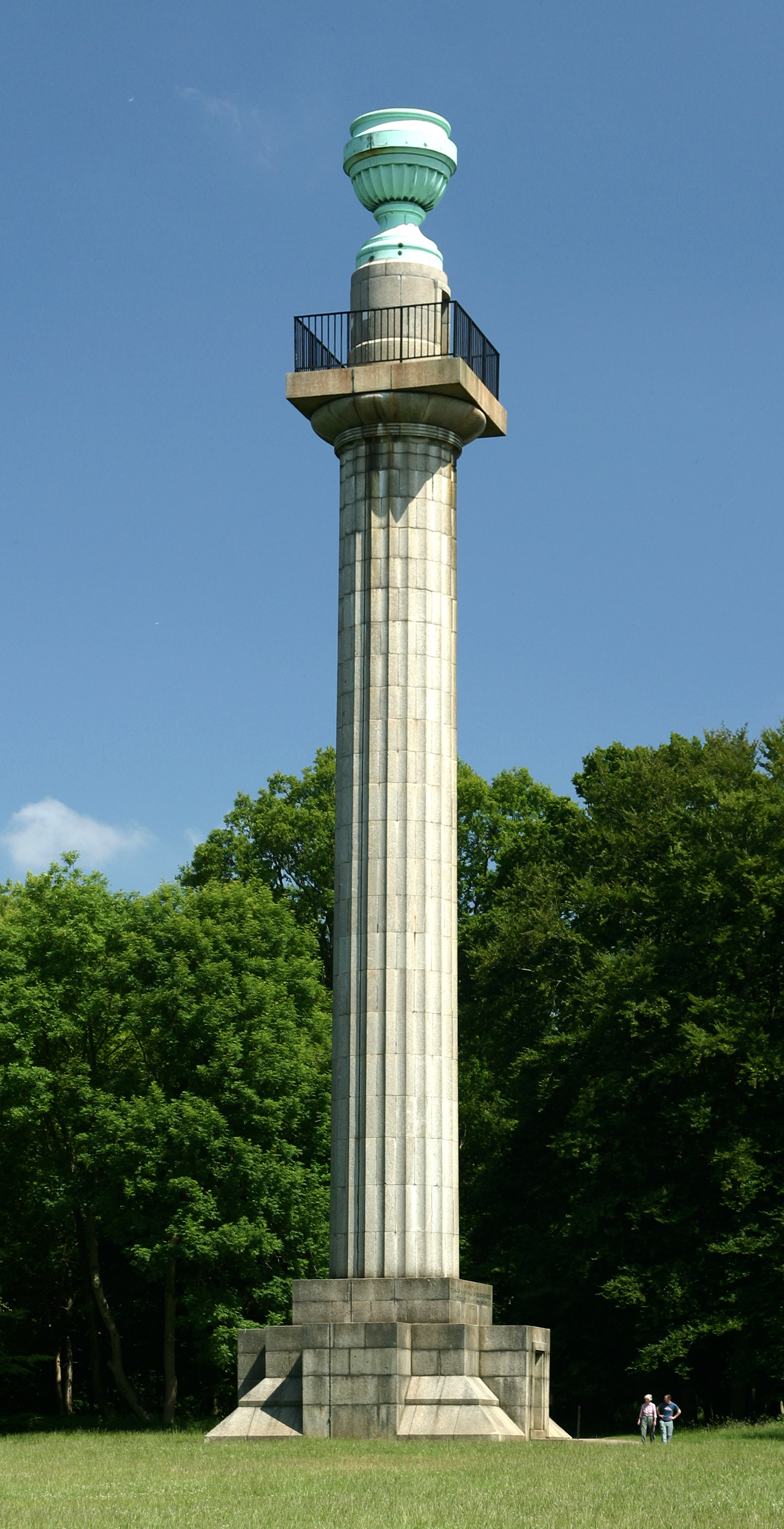
- The Bridgewater Monument
- Interactive map of Bridgewater Monument
- Location: Ashridge, Hertfordshire; United Kingdom
- Coordinates: 51.80829°N 0.59426°W grid reference SP968132
- Type: Victory column
- Material: Granite
- Height: 108 feet (33 m)
- Completion date: 1832
- Dedicated to: Francis Egerton, 3rd Duke of Bridgewater
- Website: nationaltrust.org.uk

The Bridgewater Monument is a Grade II* listed monumental column in the Ashridge estate in Hertfordshire, England. It was built in 1832 to commemorate Francis Egerton, 3rd Duke of Bridgewater (1736–1803), known as the "Canal Duke".

== History ==
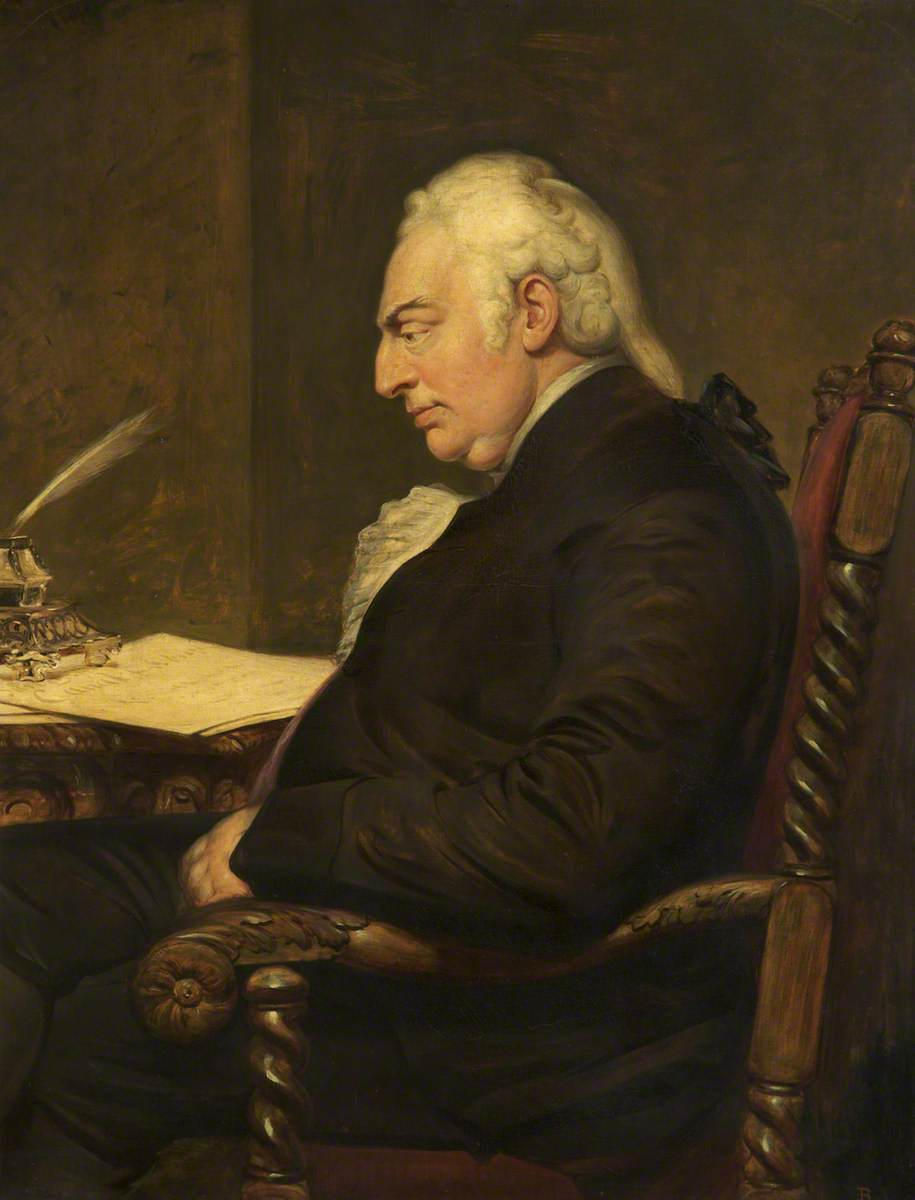
The 3rd Duke of Bridgewater, whom the monument commemorates

Francis Egerton, 3rd Duke of Bridgewater and 6th Earl of Bridgewater was a pioneer in the construction of canals during the early part of the Industrial Revolution. In 1761, he opened the Bridgewater Canal in North West England to transport coal from his mines in Worsley to Manchester, later extending it to Runcorn and then to Leigh. It is often said to be the first true canal in Britain, and earned him the nickname of "the Canal Duke".

The monument is near the family seat, Ashridge House in Hertfordshire, which the Duke neglected for many years and then decided to rebuild. Although he demolished the dilapidated house, he did not see through his ambitious plans as he died in 1803, leaving the ruins to his successor, John Egerton, 7th Earl of Bridgewater, who built a new house.

The Canal Duke was buried in the family mausoleum in the Church of St Peter and St Paul in the village of Little Gaddesden, around 1.8 miles (2.9 km) east of the monument. A marble wall monument there commemorates his death.

A memorial to the Duke was considered by his successor, the 7th Earl of Bridgewater, but it was not until the death of his brother, Francis Egerton, 8th Earl of Bridgewater in 1829 that funds were made available. The 8th Earl left in his will £13,500 (equivalent to £1,306,804 in 2025) and instructions to build a monument to the Canal Duke.

== Construction ==
At the time, Charlotte Catherine Anne, Countess of Bridgewater and widow of the 7th Earl, was still in residence at Ashridge. She objected to the erection of an obelisk, which she considered to be in poor taste, and at her behest, the monument to the Canal Duke was sited some distance from Ashridge House so as not to be seen. To build the monument, the family appointed Sir Jeffry Wyattville, the architect who also worked on the Gothic Revival house on the estate. In line with the countess's wishes, he altered the design to that of a Greek column.

The Bridgewater Monument was designed by Wyattville in a Neoclassical style, consisting of a giant 108-foot (33 m)-tall fluted Greek Doric column surmounted by a giant copper funerary urn finial.

There are 172 steps inside and the abacus provides a viewing platform. At the base, the large pedestal is inscribed with the words:

'IN HONOUR OF
FRANCIS, THIRD DUKE OF BRIDGEWATER
"FATHER OF INLAND NAVIGATION"
1832'

Inside the entrance passage leading up to the staircase is a brass plate, which records the instruction of the 8th Earl to erect the monument with the inscription:

THIS COLUMN WAS ERECTED CONFORMABLE WITH THE INTENTION OF JOHN WILLIAM EARL OF BRIDGEWATER ACCORDING TO THE TESTAMENTARY DIRECTION OF FRANCIS HENRY EARL OF BRIDGEWATER AND WITH THE APPROBATION OF CHARLOTTE C. ANNE COUNTESS OF BRIDGEWATER IN HONOUR OF FRANCIS THIRD DUKE OF BRIDGEWATER, WHO BY DEVOTING THE ENERGIES OF HIS MIND TO THE ACCOMPLISHMENT OF THE MOST SPLENDID WORKS OF INLAND NAVIGATION OPENED A NEW FIELD TO NATIONAL INDUSTRY AND RENDERED THE MOST IMPORTANT SERVICES TO THE COMMERCIAL INTERESTS OF HIS COUNTRY

Although the waterway most closely associated with the deceased was the Bridgewater Canal, it is thought that the monument was erected to celebrate the construction of the Grand Junction Canal, which passes around 1.3 miles (2.1 km) south-west of the site. The Bridgewater Monument stands on Moneybury Hill, a protruding part of the Ashridge plateau, and overlooks the village of Aldbury.

== Visitor attraction ==
Today the Bridgewater Monument, like the Ashridge Estate, is in the care of the National Trust. At weekends, the monument is open to visitors, who can climb 172 steps inside the column to enjoy views of Ashridge and the Chiltern Hills. It is also possible to see as far as Canary Wharf in east London.

== Image gallery ==
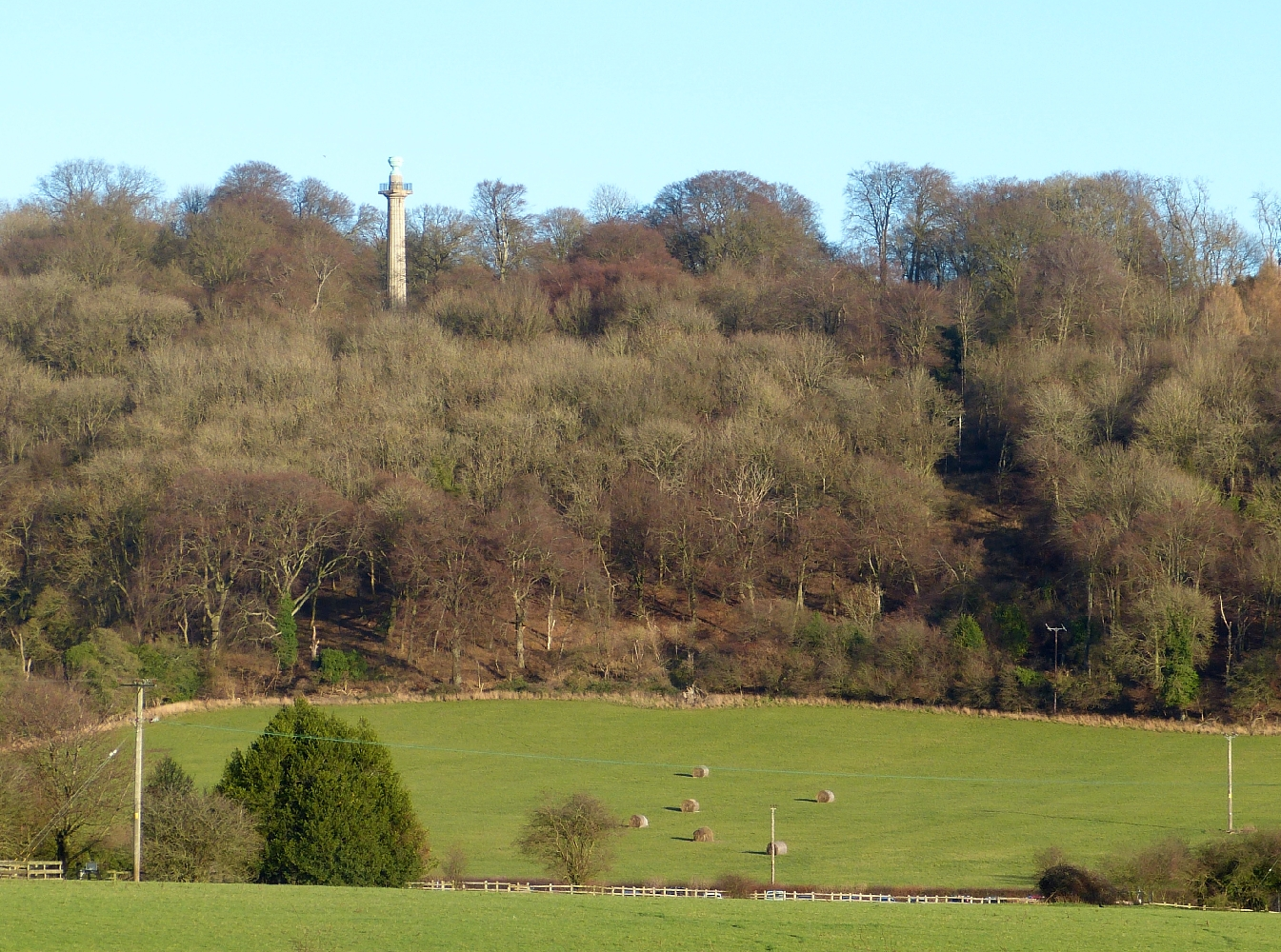
The monument seen from Aldbury

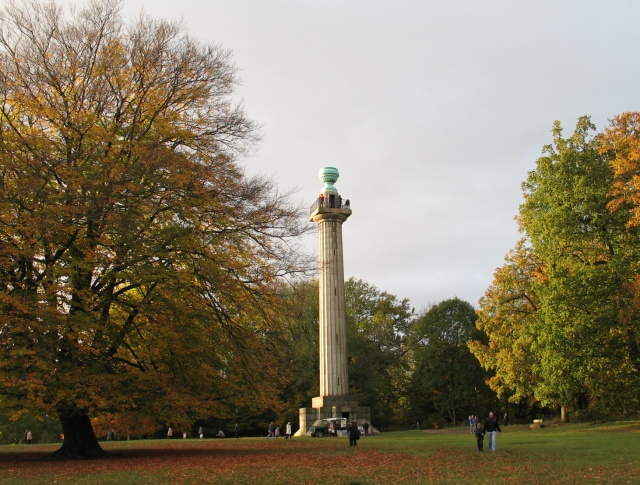
The monument

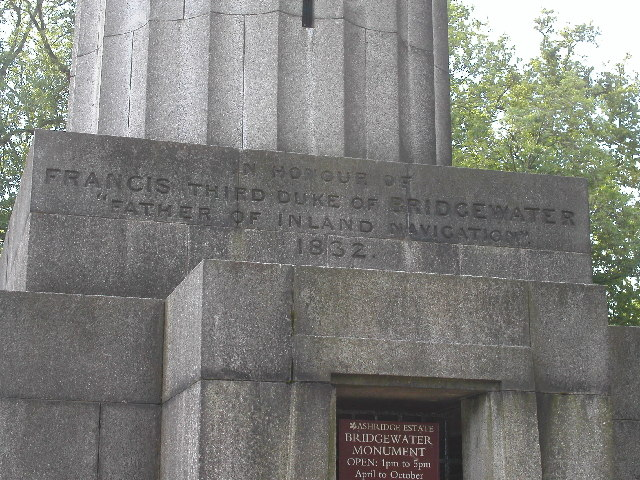
Inscription on the plinth

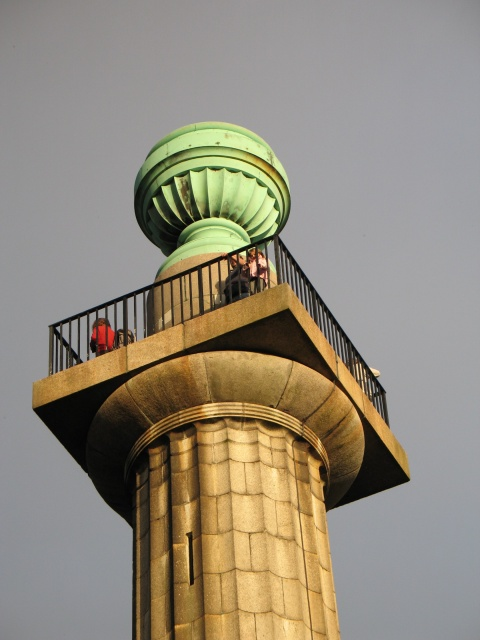
The finial urn and viewing platform

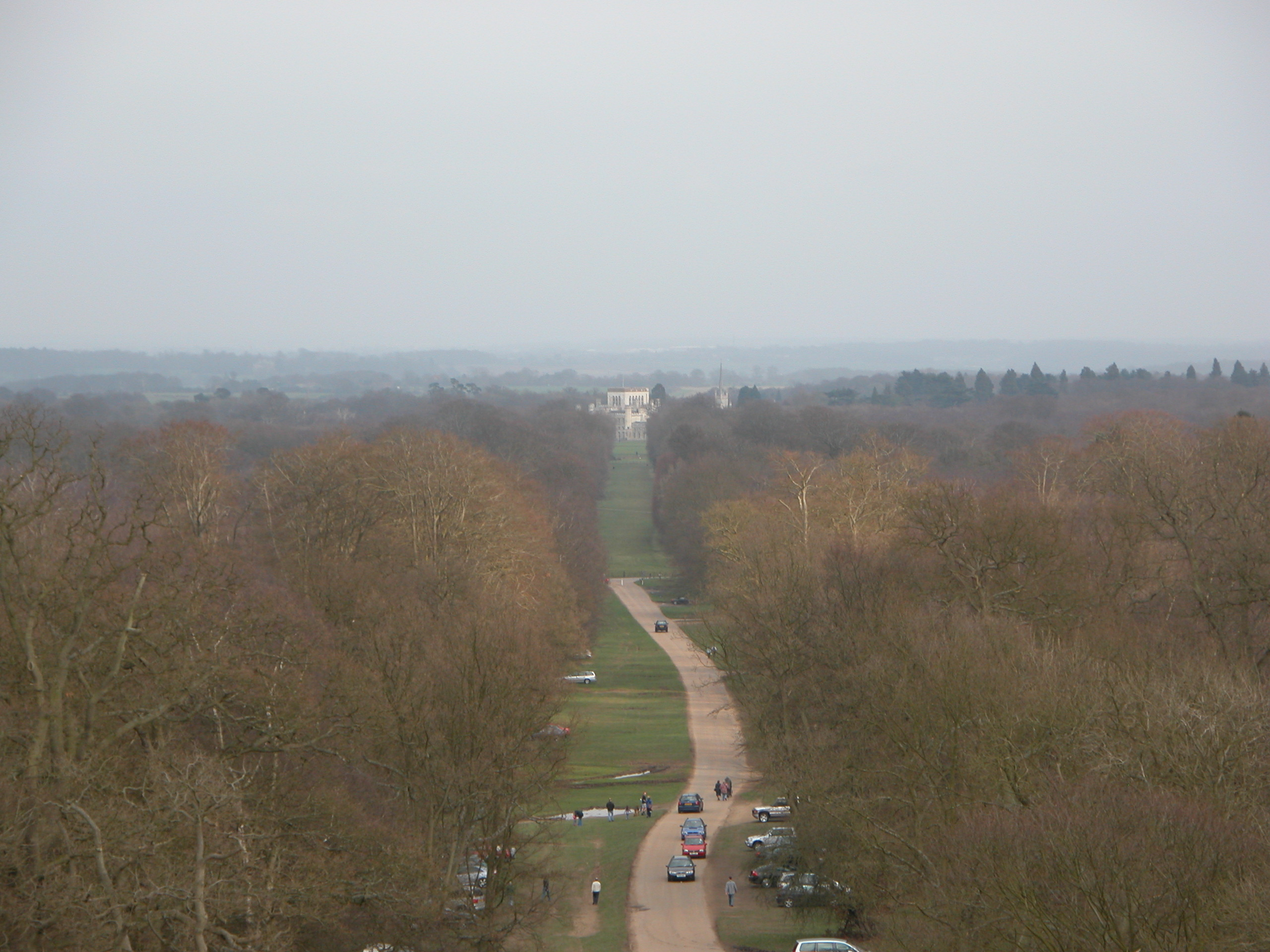
View from the top looking along Princes Riding to Ashridge House
