= Listed buildings in Caldwell, North Yorkshire =

Caldwell is a civil parish in the county of North Yorkshire, England. It contains two listed buildings that are recorded in the National Heritage List for England. Both the listed buildings are designated at Grade II, the lowest of the three grades, which is applied to "buildings of national importance and special interest". The parish contains the village of Caldwell and the surrounding countryside, and the listed buildings consist of a pigeoncote and a farmhouse.

== Buildings ==
Name and location	Photograph	Date	Notes
Pigeoncote; 54.51618°N 1.75053°W		Late 16th or early 17th century	The pigeoncote is in stone, it has a circular plan, and is tapering. There are two tiers of projecting courses, and a corbelled roof with a shallow saucer dome. On the southeast is a small door with a timber lintel, and inside are nesting boxes and ledges.
Mill Farmhouse; 54.51223°N 1.75050°W	—	Late 18th to early 19th century	The farmhouse is in stone, with quoins, and a pantile roof with stone slates at the eaves and stone coping. There are two storeys and an L-shaped plan, with a main range of two bays, and a rear wing. The windows are sashes, most of them horizontally-sliding. Attached to the farmhouse are a former cornmill and sawmill, which have been converted for other purposes.
