= Vicars Bell =

Vicars Bell MBE
- Vicars Walker Bell by Elliott & Fry, 1948
- Born: Vicars Walker Bell; 24 January 1904; Redhill, Surrey, England
- Died: 21 April 1988 (aged 84); Tavistock, Devon, England
- Education: University College London
- Occupations: Schoolteacher; Author
- Spouse: Dorothy E. Carley (m. 1926)
- Writing career
- Genres: Children's; Mystery; History
- Notable works: Little Gaddesden: The Story of an English Parish; The Dodo: The Story of a Village Schoolmaster

Vicars Walker Bell MBE (24 January 1904 – 21 April 1988) was a schoolteacher, and later headmaster, at Little Gaddesden Church of England School in Hertfordshire, England, from 1929 to 1963. He was also a successful author who wrote children's books, detective stories set in a rural village, and autobiographical and non-fiction works. He was described by The Times as a "village chronicler".

== Early life and family ==
Vicars Bell was born on 24 January 1904 in Redhill in the borough of Reigate, Surrey. He studied at University College London, and intended to become a clergyman, but decided to teach, instead, due to his poor health.

He married Dorothy E. Carley in Reigate in 1926.

== Career ==
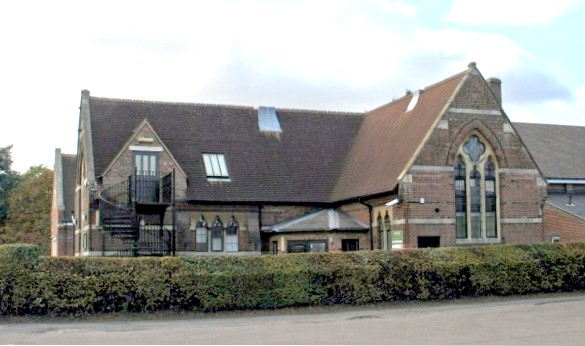
Little Gaddesden Church of England Primary School, seen in 2009

Bell was a schoolteacher at Little Gaddesden Church of England School from 1929 to 1963, eventually becoming headmaster of the school.

He was also a successful author. In 1950, he produced his autobiography, The Dodo: The Story of a Village Schoolmaster, which, like most of his books, was published by Faber and Faber. A bibliography of British biographies described it as covering his schooldays and work as a teacher, his teaching philosophy, his distaste for modern education, and his love of the countryside.

He wrote several children's books and a number of detective stories set in a rural village, the protagonist of which is the disabled entomologist Dr. Douglas Baynes who helps the local police solve murder cases. His novels were regarded as competent, rather than outstanding. The Times described Death and the Night Watches (1955) as written with "much ingenuity, and an amiable knowledge of village ways [but] Mr. Bell does not seem to succeed in making his story matter very much". The Spectator described Death Walks by the River (1959) as a "pleasant, unexciting, agreeably written tale of murder in an English village, with some pleasant cricket-match and country-pub embroideries", but one in which coincidence played too great a role.

His historical To Meet Mr. Ellis (1956), an account of village life in Little Gaddesden in the eighteenth century, was described by The Times as the work of a "village chronicler" who "sees the past in the present, and the present prompts him to seek for origins".

He was appointed MBE in Queen Elizabeth's 1964 New Year Honours.

== Death and legacy ==
Vicars Bell died alongside his wife in a car crash in Tavistock, Devon, on 21 April 1988. In 2012, two of his works, Little Gaddesden and The Dodo, were republished by the Rural Heritage Society of Little Gaddesden in a combined volume.

== Selected publications ==
Works by Vicars Bell include:

=== Non-fiction ===
- Little Gaddesden: The Story of an English Parish. Faber and Faber, London, 1949.
- The Dodo: The Story of a Village Schoolmaster. Faber and Faber, London, 1950.
- This Way Home: The Story of a Voyage in Search of the Earth. Faber and Faber, London, 1951.
- On Learning the English Tongue. Faber and Faber, London, 1953.
- To Meet Mr. Ellis: Little Gaddesden in the Eighteenth Century. Faber and Faber, London, 1956.
- Steep Ways and Narrow. A Layman's Autobiography. Faber and Faber, London, 1963.

=== Detective stories ===
- Death Under the Stars. Faber and Faber, London, 1949.
- Death Has Two Doors. Faber and Faber, London, 1950.
- Two by Day and One by Night. Faber and Faber, London, 1950.
- Death Darkens Council. Faber and Faber, London, 1952.
- Death and the Night Watches. Faber and Faber, London, 1955.
- Death Walks by the River. Faber and Faber, London, 1959.

=== Children's ===
- That Night: A Play for the Nativity. Faber and Faber, London, 1959.
- Orlando and Rosalind: Three Tales. Faber and Faber, London, 1960. (Illustrated by Dorothea Patterson)
- The Flying Cat. Faber and Faber, London, 1964. (Illustrated by Dorothea Patterson)
- Prayers for Every Day: A Book for Schools. Oxford University Press, London, 1965. (Editor)
