= William Ellis (writer on agriculture) =

English farmer and writer on agriculture

William Ellis (c. 1700—1758) was an English farmer of Little Gaddesden, near Hemel Hempstead, in Hertfordshire, known as writer on agriculture.

== Biography ==
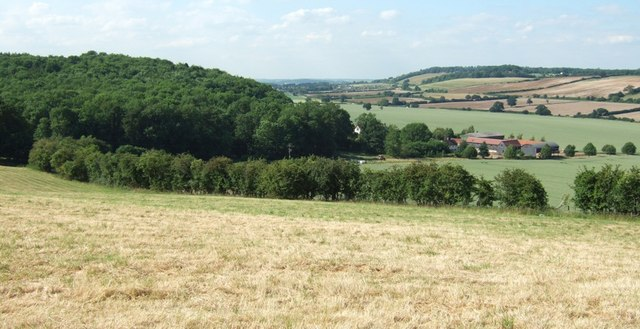
Farm lands near Little Gaddesden.

Ellis is supposed to have been born about 1700, received an ordinary education, and began life as a plain farmer. For nearly fifty years he held a farm at Little Gaddesden, Hertfordshire, on which, however, he made no pretense to scientific agriculture. He was evidently a person of intelligence, and had travelled much both in this country and on the continent.

His early works brought him into 'repute,' and many applications were made to him by landed proprietors in all parts of the country to visit and report on their farms. Thus he traveled over the north of England in order to give those who complied with his terms the benefit of his experience.

Ellis seems to have been a shrewd man of business, for he soon added to his income by frequently traveling as an agent for seeds and seller of farming implements; in short he was ready to execute any sort of country business at a fixed price. Many eager farmers, led by his fame and his books, proceeded to visit Ellis's farm, but found, to their surprise and disappointment, that he did not carry out any of the views which he advocated in print, that his implements were old-fashioned, and that his land was neglected and in bad condition. This report, speedily reacted on the sale of his books. They had introduced many new methods of treating manure, sheep and turnips, and lucerne, but now their reputation began to decline. Ellis perceived with sorrow that he was outliving his fame.

== Work ==
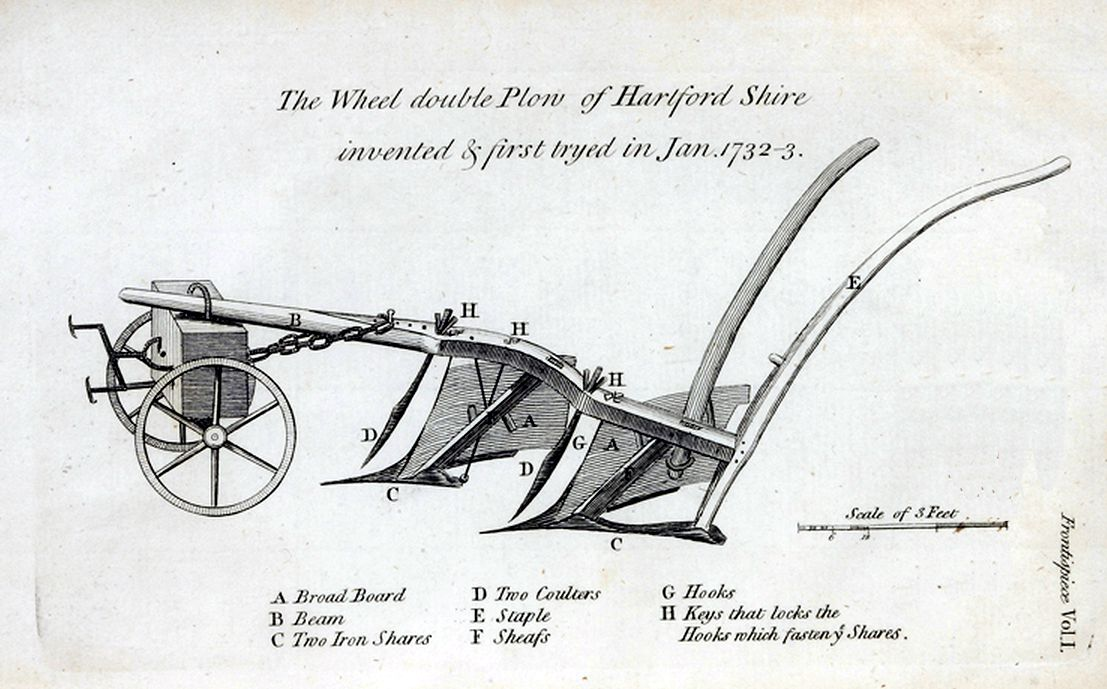
Title plate Husbandry Abridged and Methodized, 1772

The success which his work on timber obtained (it ran through three editions in less than three years) tempted Osborne, the book-seller, to engage him as a writer, and Ellis produced with much fecundity volume after volume. Gradually he advanced to monthly works and more voluminous productions, in which, to fill up his stipulated number of pages, he was driven to introduce those ridiculous anecdotes and unnecessary details which have so much marred his writings.

So long as Ellis proceeded according to his own rule (Preface to Farriery), "I always considered experience as the only touchstone of truth, and by that unerring rule every particular here advanced has been sufficiently tried," all was well, and his books were valued accordingly. But the editor of his last book was compelled before printing it to exclude many foolish stories of gipsies, thieves, and the like, also many absurd nostrums and receipts, evidently only inserted to fill space. Ellis's books have become useless, from the advance in agricultural science.

=== The Practical Farmer, or the Hertfordshire Husbandman, 1732 ===
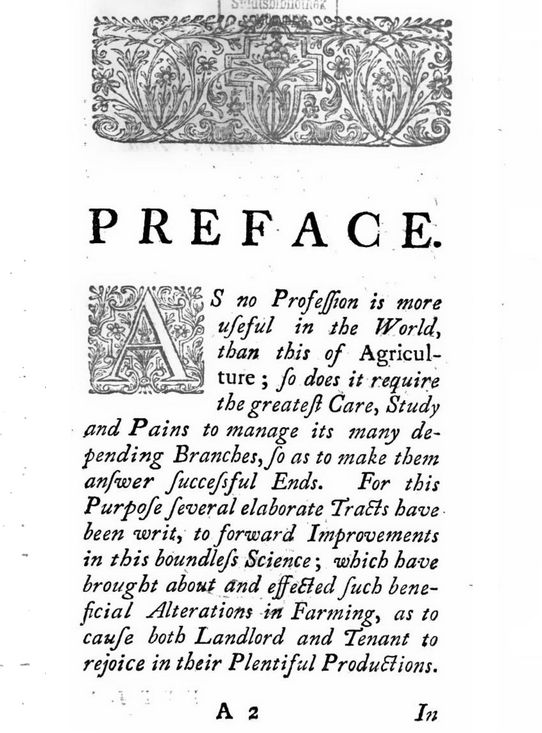
Preface of The Practical Farmer, 1732

The work of The Practical Farmer, or the Hertfordshire Husbandman, 223 pages octavo size, was first published in 1732. It has gone through five editions, the last edition published in 1759. It treats the meliorating of soils, the grains, grasses, cows, sheep, and suckling of calves; pigeons and rabbits; forest trees; manures, hops, foreign wheats; comparison of different methods of farming. The author recommends horse-hoeing of peas and beans, and burnt clay as a manure, and seems fully aware of the vast benefit to light lands from consuming the turnips on the ground by sheep.

Cows pay £1 a-year clear profit by suckling fat calves, or from butter and cheese, and last for ten years. The diseases are treated and cured. The author reckons sheep the most eligible of all animals, and where they are not kept a farmer's destiny may easily be read. The rot is the great misfortune, and is caused by water, and grows. It is cured by salt and dry food. Fruit trees are not forgotten for the farmer's use, and the making of cyder ana1 perry. Manures are mentioned, but not at much length, and hops are noticed; the comparison of the farming of different counties; states the practices of use, but does not enter into the merits of preference.

=== Chiltern and Vale Farming, 1733 ===
Chiltern and Vale Farming explained forms an octavo volume of 400 pages; and treats the cropping of sour clay lands, with the common grain and leguminous plants; the natural and artificial grasses; ploughing in general; seeds; weeds; liquor for a corn steep; horse-hoeing; turnips, use and value; manures in general. The wheel-plough, with two mould-boards, is figured and largely described; and the author seems very fond of its supposed value. The management of the works is confused; the planting of oak and fruit trees being introduced in the very middle of a book on arable lands.

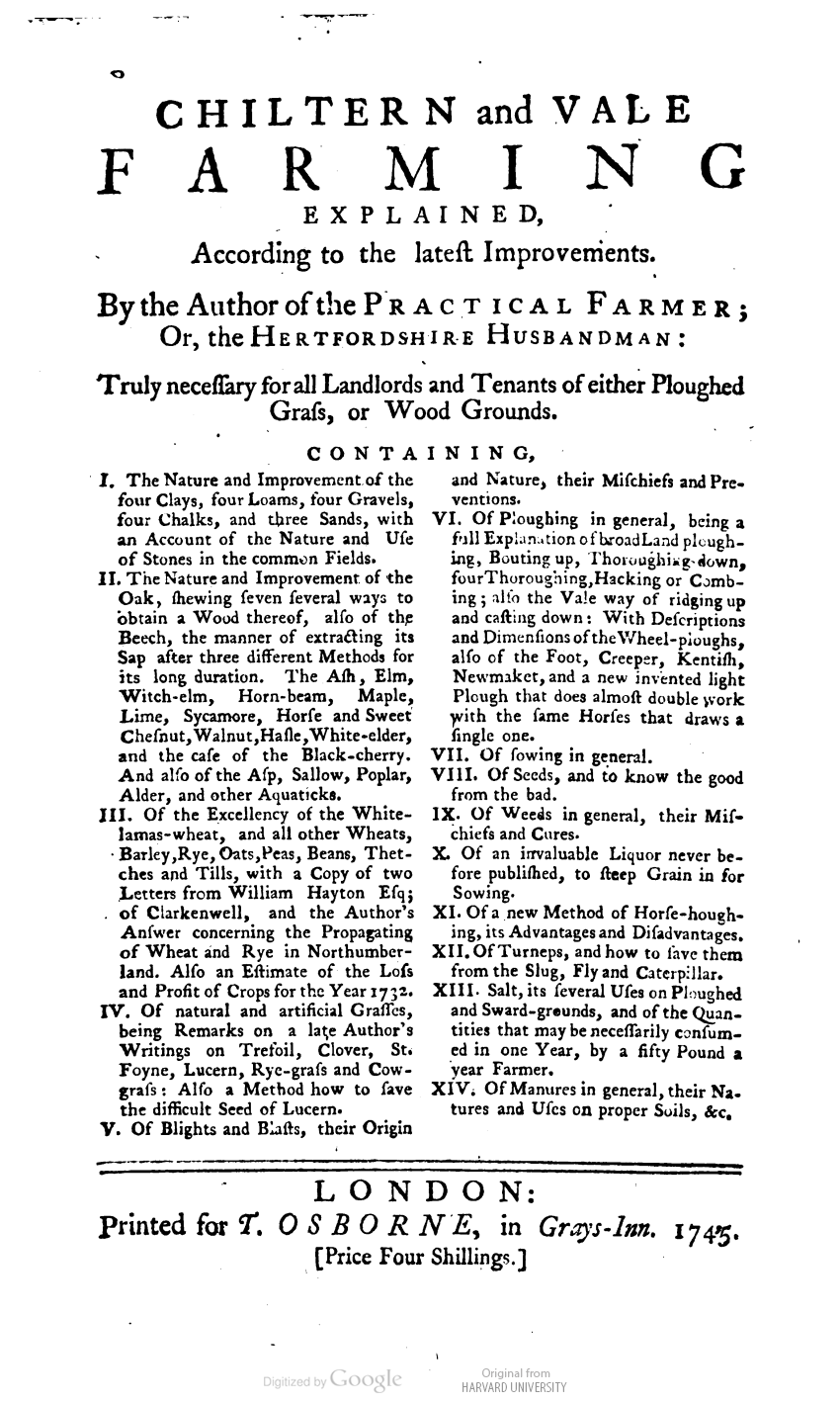
Title page Chiltern and Vale Farming, 1745 edition.

The grains are separately discussed in the management and value, and the following estimate is given of beans:

Rent of an acre of land in one year..	£	0 12 0
Ploughing once, straining in the beans, and harrowing		0 7 6
Seed four bushels		0 8 0
Mowing and cocking an acre of them		0 5 0
Carrying four loads out of the field ...		0 6 0
Thrashing and cleaning thirty bushels of beans		0 5 0
Taxes and tytbe		0 4 0
	£	2 7 6
Whereof received for 30 bushels of wheat	£	2 14 0
For straw and chaff		1 0 0
	£	3 14 0
Profit	£	1 6 6

Oats yield a profit of £1 1s.; and in the year 1732, quoted by the author, wheat cost 10s.9d and barley 3s. 6d. on an acre. The artificial grasses are white and red clovers; sainfoin, lucerne, ryegrass, and cow-grass. The latter plant means the cow-grass, or Trifolium medium of botany. The manures are well described; bat no new substance is added to former lists, only hoofs come very near to the knowledge of bones. Of lime the author thinks that calcination sets free and enables to act a balsamic alkaline salt that is coagulated in the crude stone or chalk, and till the acid barren quality is evaporated by tire, the salts in them are of little or no signification to the land. Fire, fermentation, and putrefaction cure the dead quality and bring out the dormant powers. Lime is used in three ways—by mixing it with turf or mould, by being sown over the ground when pulverized, and over the ground with turnip seed, on a clover ley sometime previous to being ploughed. He thinks hot lime kills the small animals of the soil, and that it must benefit lands of every kind in some degree. Chalk is reckoned an excellent alternative, and corrects every kind of acidity.

=== The Modern Husbandman, 1750 ===
This treats of the farmer's year month by month and of rural economy in general; it is Ellis's best work, though such a sentence as 'Be yourself the first man up in a morning for sounding at your door your harvest horn to call your men at four o'clock,' contrasts amusingly with the writer's own practice according to those who went to visit him at Little Gaddesden.

== Publications ==
Ellis's works consist of:

- William Ellis. The Practical Farmer, Or, the Hertfordshire Husbandman: Containing Many New Improvements in Husbandry 1732; 5th ed. 1759
- William Ellis. Chiltern and Vale Farming, 1733.
- William Ellis. The Practice of Farming and Husbandry in all Sorts of Soils, according to the latest Improvements, 1735
- William Ellis. New Experiments in Husbandry for the Month of April,' 1736.
- William Ellis. The London and country brewer, 1737
- William Ellis. The Timber-Tree Improved, 1738. These last two are tracts.
- William Ellis. Agriculture improv'd: or, The practice of husbandry display'd, 1746
- William Ellis. The Shepherd's Sure Guide, 1749; full of fatuous anecdotes of sheep and dogs.
- William Ellis. The Modern Husbandman, 8 vols., 1750. Vol. 1; Vol. 2; Vol. 3; Vol. 4; Vol. 8
- William Ellis. The Country House wife's Family Companion, 1750.
- William Ellis. The Compleat Cyderman: Or, the Present Practice of Raising Plantations of the Best Cyder Apple and Perry Pear-trees, with the Improvement of Their Excellent Juices. ... By Experienc'd Hands, R. Baldwin, 1754
- William Ellis. Every Farmer his own Farrier, 1769.
- William Ellis. Husbandry Abridged and Methodized, 2 vols., 1772. Vol. 1
