= Little Gaddesden =

Village in Hertfordshire, England

Coordinates: 51°48′17″N 00°33′14″W

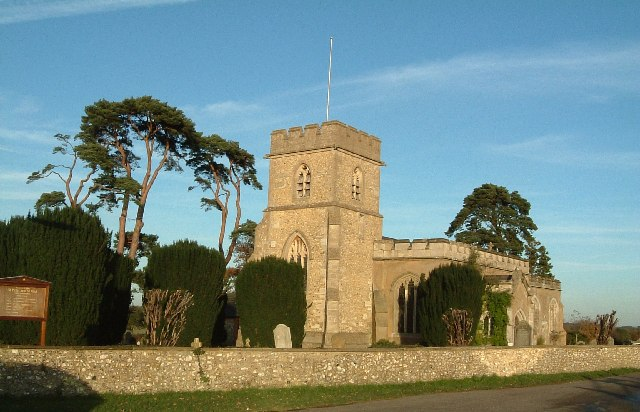
- Saint Peter and Saint Paul's church at Little Gaddesden

- Location within Hertfordshire
- Population: 1,125 (2011)
- OS grid reference: SP997127
- Civil parish: Little Gaddesden
- District: Dacorum
- Shire county: Hertfordshire
- Region: East
- Country: England
- Sovereign state: United Kingdom
- Post town: Berkhamsted
- Postcode district: HP4
- Dialling code: 01442
- Police: Hertfordshire
- Fire: Hertfordshire
- Ambulance: East of England
- UK Parliament: Harpenden and Berkhamsted

Little Gaddesden (pronounced /lɪtl ɡædzdən/) is a village and civil parish in the borough of Dacorum, Hertfordshire 3 miles (4.8 km) north of Berkhamsted, close to the border with Bedfordshire. As well as Little Gaddesden village (population 694), the parish contains the settlements of Ashridge (population 53), Hudnall (population 139), and part of Ringshall (population 81). The total population at the 2011 Census was 1,125.

Little Gaddesden is an area of outstanding natural beauty (AONB) and a conservation area protected by the National Trust.

Little Gaddesden and the surrounding area of the Ashridge Estate is owned and managed by the National Trust. This area has been used in many films, notably: First Knight, Stardust, the Harry Potter series, Son of Rambow, Robin Hood starring Russell Crowe, and more recently Fast & Furious 9: The Fast Saga.

TV programmes filmed here include the Netflix biographical drama The Crown, Marchlands, Midsomer Murders, Lewis, Cranford, and a Jamie Oliver advertisement for Sainsbury's.

There is a vigorous community life with over 25 different clubs and societies.

Local residents are kept updated on events in Little Gaddesden through The Gaddesden Diary, published seasonally. The Parish News also provides a further summary.

== History ==
In the early 17th century, Thomas Egerton, 1st Viscount Brackley, purchased Ashridge House, a large country house, from Queen Elizabeth I, who had inherited it from her father who had appropriated it after the Dissolution of the Monasteries in 1539. Ashridge House served the Egerton family as a residence until the 19th century. The Egertons later had a family chapel (the Bridgewater Chapel) with burial vault in Little Gaddesden Church.

Hudnall was formerly in the parish of Edlesborough, Buckinghamshire until it was transferred to the parish of Little Gaddesden in 1884. Hudnall was first recorded as a farmstead in 1545, and later held by the Earl of Chesterfield, via inheritance from Lady Elizabeth Dormer.

== Landmarks ==
Little Gaddesden has many period properties, of note: Ashridge House, (designed by Sir James Wyattville along with gardens and grounds designed by Humphry Repton and Capability Brown), The Manor House situated on the Green along with John O’Gaddesden House and Marian House, Little Gaddesden House along Nettleden Road heading towards the hamlet of Nettleden and the Old Rectory past the village shop heading to Ringshall.

A memorial cross and drinking fountain erected to the memory of Marian Alford is situated in Little Gaddesden. It is listed Grade II on the National Heritage List for England.

=== Parish Church ===
The Church of St Peter and St Paul at the north end of the village is mostly 15th century in origin. It was refurbished in 1819 by Jeffry Wyatt for John Egerton, 7th Earl of Bridgewater. The interior contains many 19th-century fittings and adornments, including an 1896 fresco on the east wall, which is a copy of a fresco by Benozzo Gozzoli in the chapel of the Palazzo Medici Riccardi in Florence.

The church is particularly noted for the Bridgewater Chapel, built as a mausoleum for the Dukes and Earls of Bridgewater of Ashridge and their families. It is covered by a plaster ribbed vaulted ceiling with floral bosses designed by Francis Bernasconi in 1817, and contains a number of sculptured monuments to members of the Bridgewater family. Among these is a monument to the 7th Earl, John William Egerton and his wife Charlotte Catherine Anne, Countess of Bridgewater, designed by the sculptor Sir Richard Westmacott; a monument to Francis Egerton, 8th Earl of Bridgewater (d.1829). also by Westmacott, depicting a seated female accompanied by an elephant, celebrating the 'Works of the Creation'; a memorial to Elizabeth Viscountess Brackley (d.1669), and a monument to the 3rd Duke of Bridgewater, famous as the originator of British inland navigation and the Bridgewater Canal.

Other monuments of note in the church include a monument to John Egerton, 2nd Earl of Bridgewater; and the "Red Lady" monument in the South Aisle, commemorating Elizabeth Dutton, granddaughter of Sir Thomas Egerton, which was originally located in the old church of St Martin’s-in-the-Fields in London before it was pulled down in the 1720s.

Bridgewater memorials

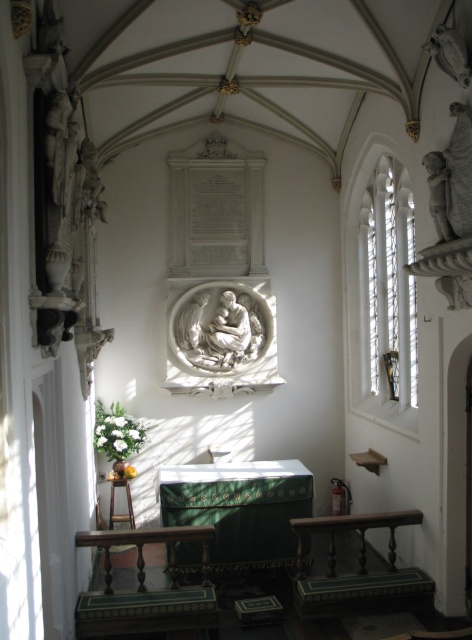
The Bridgewater Chapel

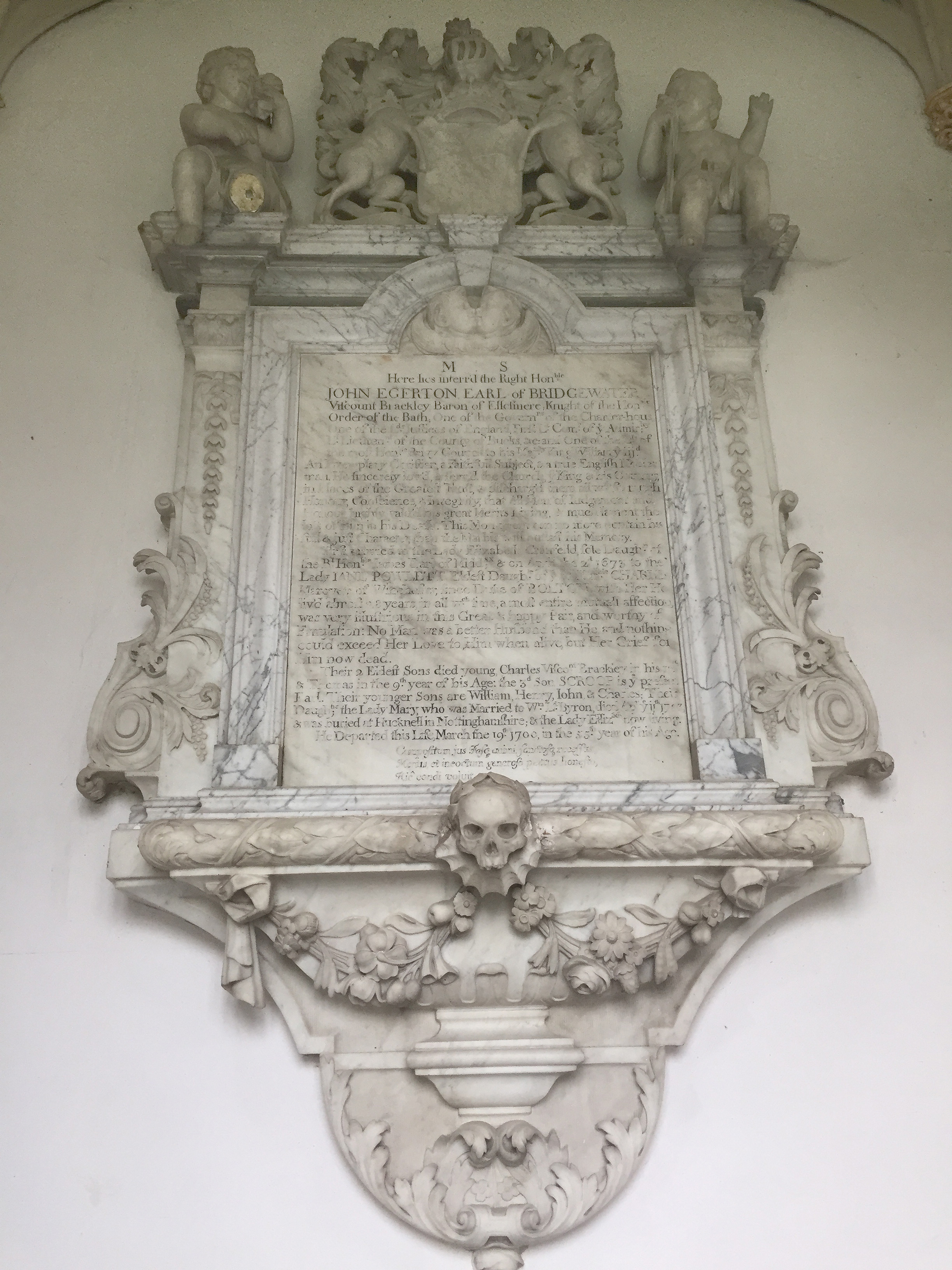
Memorial to John Egerton, 3rd Earl of Bridgewater (1646–1701)

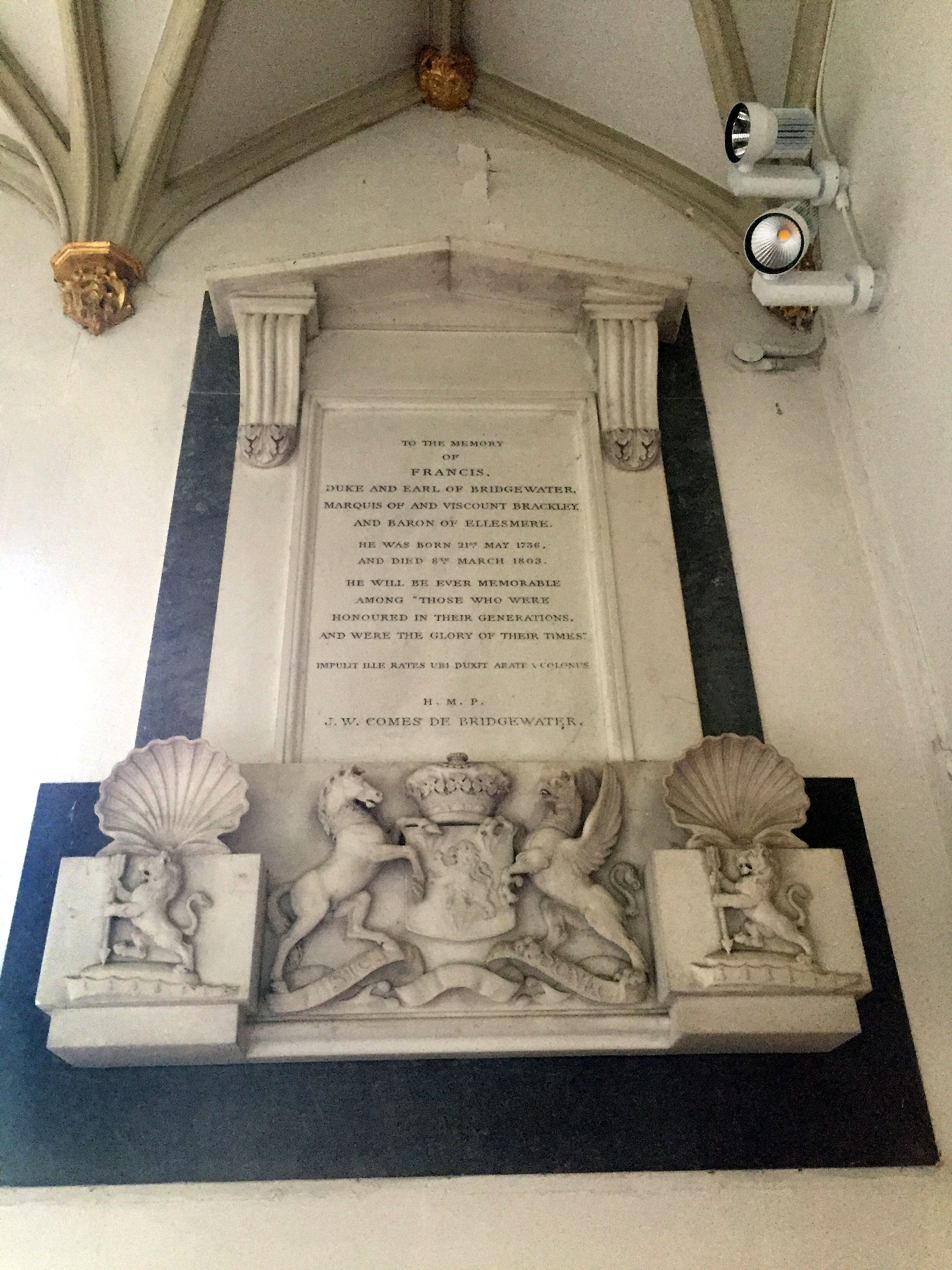
Memorial to Francis Egerton, 3rd Duke of Bridgewater, 6th Earl of Bridgewater (1736–1803)

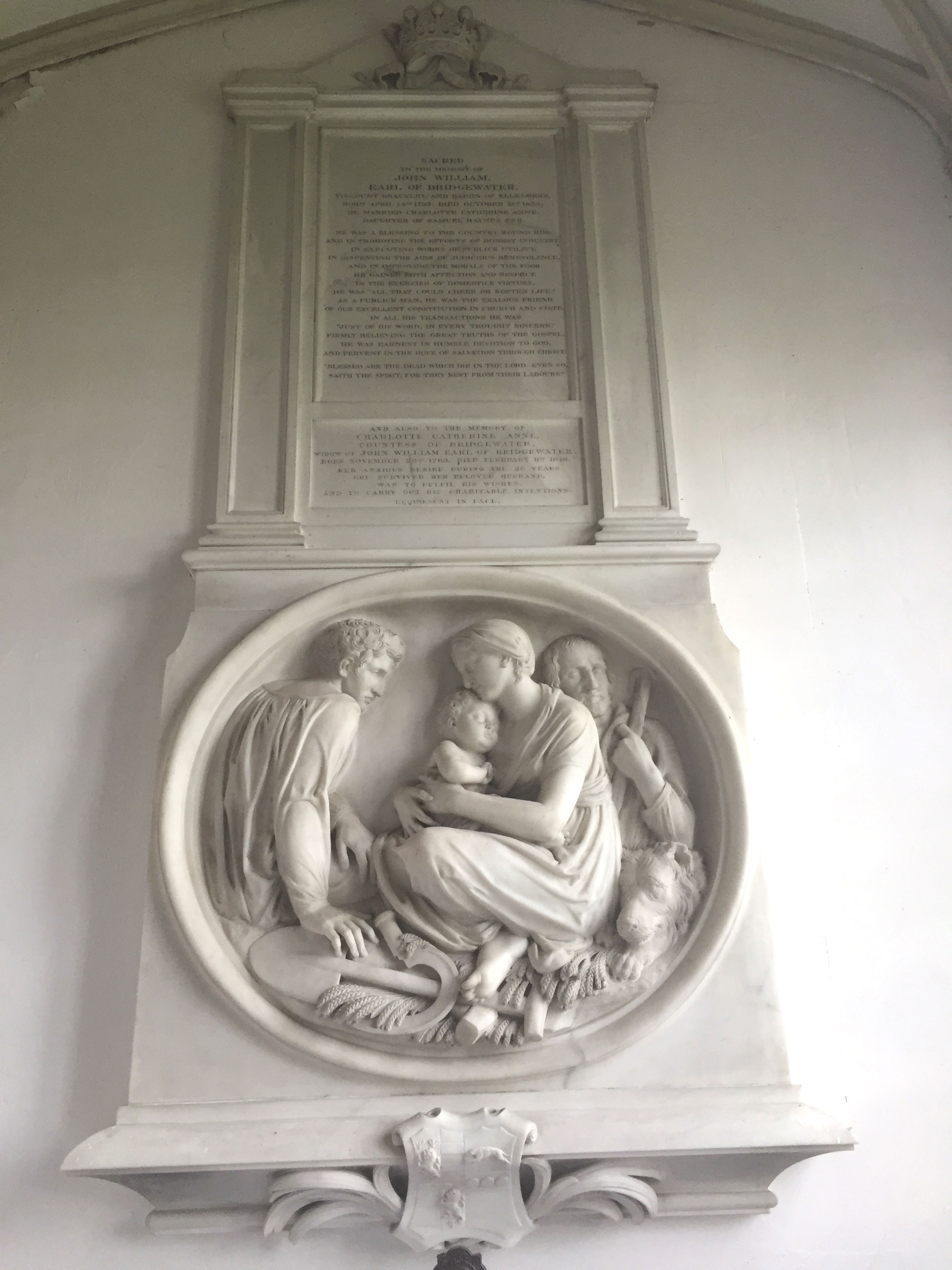
Memorial to John William Egerton, 7th Earl of Bridgewater (1753–1823)

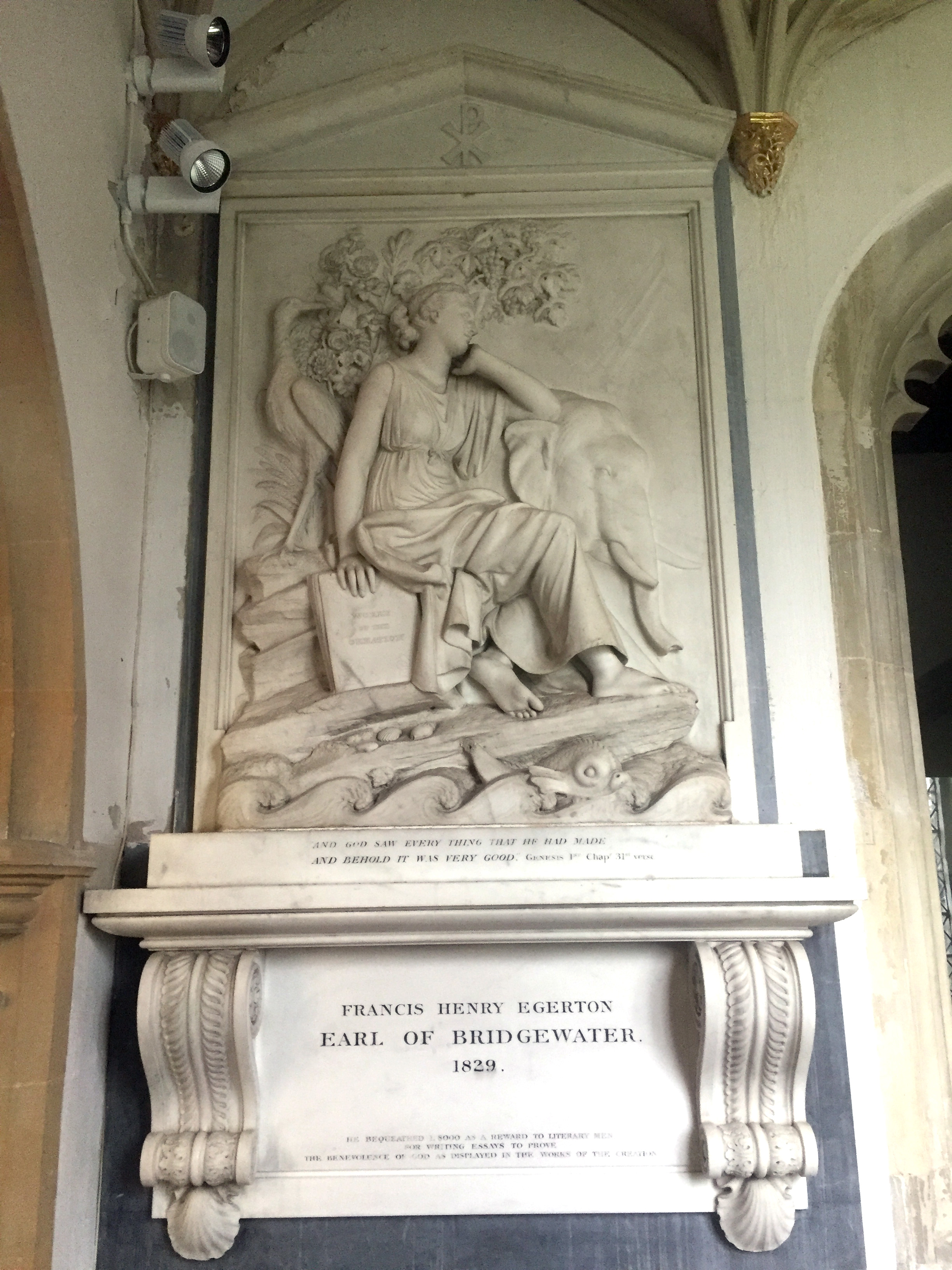
Memorial to Francis Henry Egerton, 8th Earl of Bridgewater (1756–1829)

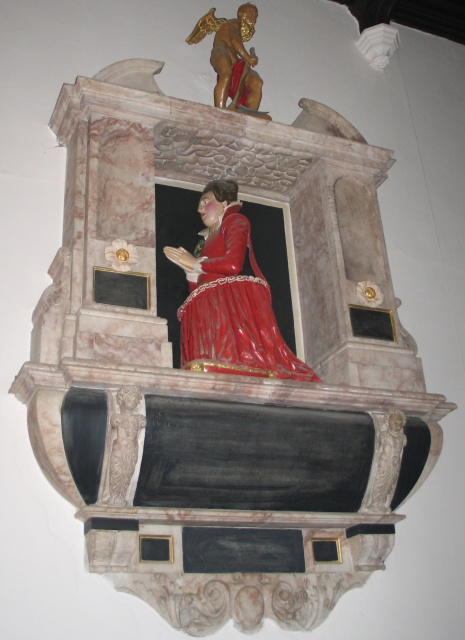
The "Red Lady" memorial to Elizabeth Dutton

== Geography ==
Nearby villages and Hamlets of Little Gaddesden include: Aldbury, Great Gaddesden, Gaddesden Row, Frithsden, Nettleden, Potten End, Ivinghoe, Northchurch, Ringshall, Studham, Dudswell, Wigginton, Dagnall and Flamstead.

=== Environment ===
The Ashridge Estate that surrounds the village is a 5,000-acre (20 km^{2}) area of open countryside and woodland on the edge of the Chiltern Hills, with a rich variety of wildlife including fallow deer and muntjac. There are large areas of mature woodlands with carpets of spring bluebells and fine autumnal displays, along with the panorama from the Bridgewater Monument.

== Economy ==
Local amenities include the Alford Arms public house, Bridgewater Arms public house, Little Gaddesden Village Shop and Post Office, Munn's Farm Shop, Ivinghoe Beacon, Pitstone Windmill, Frithsden Vineyard, Gaddesden Place, the Gaddesden Estate, Walter Swinburn racing stables, Stocks House, Ashridge Business School also known as Ashridge House, London Gliding Club, Dunstable Downs and Whipsnade Zoo.

== Education ==
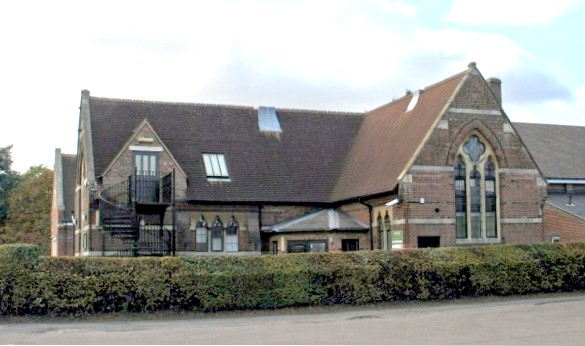
Little Gaddesden Church of England Primary School, seen in 2009.

Little Gaddesden Church of England primary school is a primary school with approximately 100 students (aged 4–11). The school is voluntarily-aided and is linked with the Diocese of St. Albans. Vicars Bell was headmaster of the school for 34 years (1929-1963).

== Sport ==
Little Gaddesden plays host to a variety of sports clubs, this includes badminton, Little Gaddesden Bowls & Croquet club, Little Gaddesden Cricket Club (which plays in the Mid-Bucks League), a junior football club, a tennis club, and Ashridge golf club.

== Notable people ==
- William Ellis (c. 1700—1758), local writer on agriculture.
- John Motson, football commentator, owned a house in the village.
- Vicars Bell (1904-1988), local schoolteacher and author.
- Sarah Brightman, singer, grew up in Little Gaddesden
- Ronnie Wood, musician with the Rolling Stones, lives in the village.

== Gallery ==
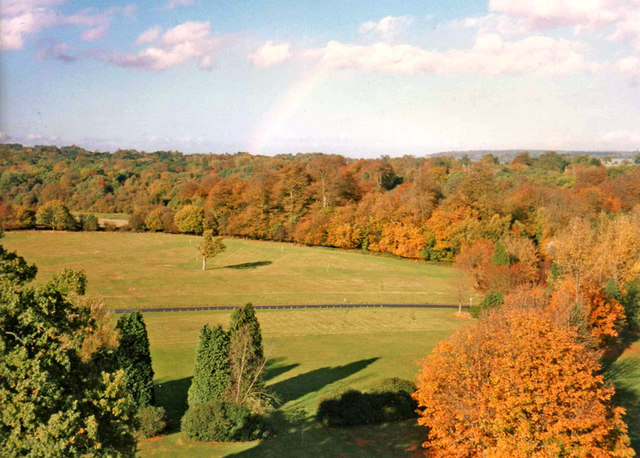
Ashridge Park, Little Gaddesden

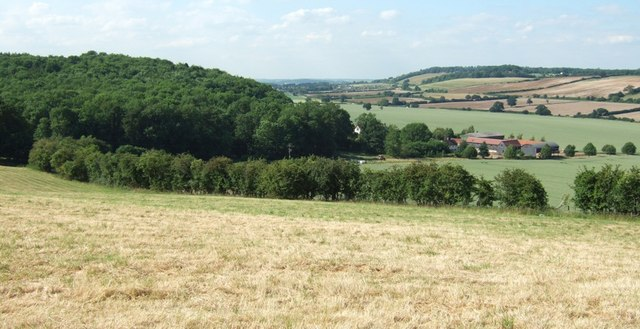
Lamsey Farm, Little Gaddesden

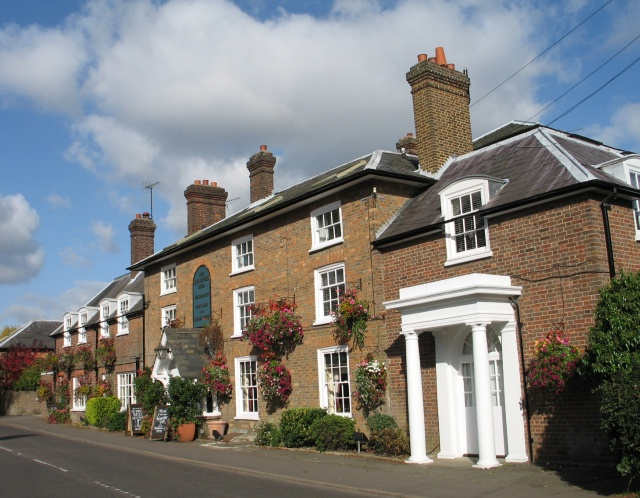
The Bridgewater arms public house, Little Gaddesden
