= Viscount Brackley =

Viscountcy in the Peerage of the United Kingdom

The title Viscount Brackley has been created twice for members of the Egerton family; once in the Peerage of England and once in the Peerage of the United Kingdom.

The first creation in the Peerage of England was in 1616 for Thomas Egerton, 1st Baron Ellesmere (1540–1617), who had been created 1st Baron Ellesmere in 1603. He died a year later and his barony and viscountcy merged with the earldom of Bridgewater, which was created for his son, John Egerton. The earldom had been meant for Thomas Egerton, but he died before he could receive it.

The second creation in the Peerage of the United Kingdom was in 1846 for Francis Egerton (1800–1857) as a subsidiary title of the earldom of Ellesmere. In 1963, the 5th Earl of Ellesmere (1915–2000) succeeded as Duke of Sutherland and the title of Viscount Brackley merged with the dukedom.

== Viscounts Brackley, first Creation (1616) ==
- Thomas Egerton, 1st Baron Ellesmere (1540–1617) (created Viscount Brackley)
- John Egerton, 2nd Viscount Brackley (1579–1649) (created Earl of Bridgewater in 1617)

For further succession, see Earl of Bridgewater, second creation

Family tree of the Barons Daubeney, Earls of Bridgewater, and Dukes of Bridgewater

Baron Daubeney, 1486
Giles Daubeney; 1451–1508; 1st Baron Daubeney
Earl of Bridgewater (1st creation), 1538
Henry Daubeney; 1493–1548; 1st Earl of Bridgewater, 2nd Baron Daubeney
Earldom of Bridgewater and Barony Daubeney extinct, 1548
Baron Ellesmere, 1603; Viscount Brackley, 1616
Thomas Egerton; 1540–1617; 1st Viscount Brackley and Baron Ellesmere
Earl of Bridgewater (2nd creation), 1617
John Egerton; 1579–1649; 1st Earl of Bridgewater, 2nd Viscount Brackley and Baron Ellesmere
John Egerton; 1623–1686; 2nd Earl of Bridgewater, 3rd Viscount Brackley and Baron Ellesmere
John Egerton; 1646–1701; 3rd Earl of Bridgewater, 4th Viscount Brackley and Baron Ellesmere
Duke of Bridgewater and Marquess of Brackley, 1720
Scroop Egerton; 1681–1745; 1st Duke of Bridgewater and Marquess of Brackley, 4th Earl of Bridgewater, 5th Viscount Brackley and Baron Ellesmere	Henry Egerton; 1689–1746
John Egerton; 1727–1748; 2nd Duke of Bridgewater and Marquess of Brackley, 5th Earl of Bridgewater, 6th Viscount Brackley and Baron Ellesmere	Francis Egerton; 1736–1803; 3rd Duke of Bridgewater and Marquess of Brackley, 6th Earl of Bridgewater, 7th Viscount Brackley and Baron Ellesmere	John Egerton; 1721–1787
John William Egerton; 1753–1823; 4th Duke of Bridgewater and Marquess of Brackley, 7th Earl of Bridgewater, 8th Viscount Brackley and Baron Ellesmere	Francis Henry Egerton; 1756–1829; 5th Duke of Bridgewater and Marquess of Brackley, 8th Earl of Bridgewater, 9th Viscount Brackley and Baron Ellesmere
All titles extinct, 1803

== See also ==
- Earl of Ellesmere – for Viscounts Brackley, second Creation (1846)
