= Earl of Bridgewater =

Title in the peerage of England

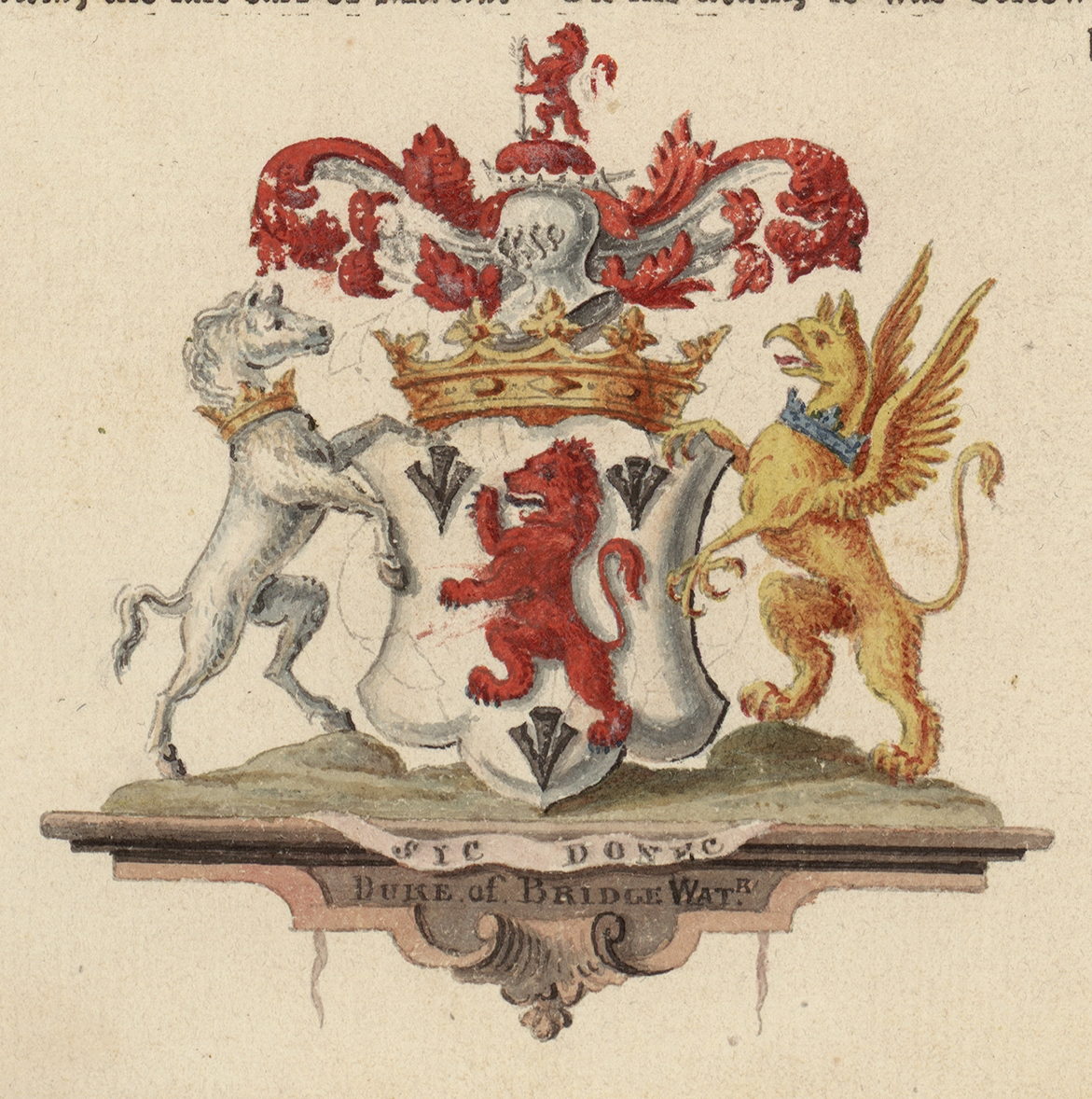
Arms of Egerton, Dukes of Bridgewater: Argent, a lion rampant gules between three pheons sable

Earl of Bridgewater was a title that has been created twice in the Peerage of England, once for the Daubeny family (1538) and once for the Egerton family (1617). From 1720 to 1803, the Earls of Bridgewater also held the title of Duke of Bridgewater. The 3rd Duke of Bridgewater is known as the "Canal Duke", for his creation of a series of canals in North West England.

== History ==
=== Creation for the Daubeny family (1538) ===
The title Earl of Bridgewater was first created in 1538 for Henry Daubeny, 9th Baron Daubeny. The Daubeney (or Dabney) family descended from Elias Daubeny, who in 1295 was summoned by writ to the Model Parliament as Lord Daubeny. The eighth Baron was created Baron Daubeny by letters patent in the Peerage of England in 1486 and was also made a Knight of the Garter the following year. All three titles became extinct on the first Earl of Bridgewater's death in 1548.

=== Creation for the Egerton family (1617) ===
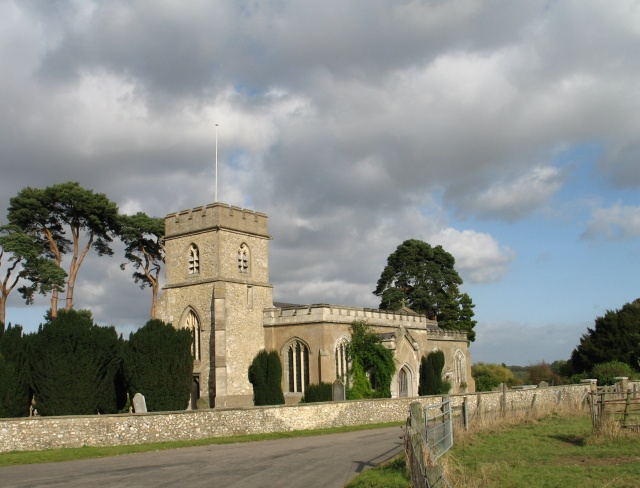
St. Peter and St. Paul Church at Little Gaddesden, where many Egerton family members are buried in the Bridgewater Chapel

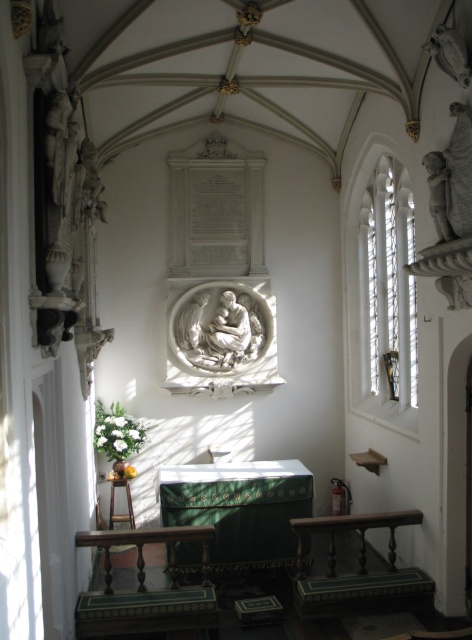
The Bridgewater Chapel at St. Peter and St. Paul Church, Little Gaddesden

The title Earl of Bridgewater was created secondly in 1617 for John Egerton, Baron Ellesmere and Viscount Brackley, after the town of Bridgwater in Somerset, where he owned estates. The Egerton family descended from Sir Richard Egerton of Ridley, Cheshire, whose illegitimate son Sir Thomas Egerton was a prominent lawyer who served as Master of the Rolls from 1594 to 1603, as Lord Keeper of the Great Seal from 1593 to 1603 and as Lord High Chancellor of England from 1603 to 1617. Thomas Egerton was knighted in 1594, admitted to the Privy Council in 1596 and in 1603 he was raised to the Peerage of England as Baron Ellesmere, in the County of Shropshire, and in 1616 to Viscount Brackley. In 1598 he had inherited the Tatton estate in Cheshire from his brother-in-law Richard Brereton. He was succeeded by his son, John who represented Callington and Shropshire in the House of Commons and served as Lord-Lieutenant of several counties in Wales and western England and who in 1617 was made Earl of Bridgewater in the Peerage of England.

He was succeeded by his eldest surviving son, the second Earl. He was Lord-Lieutenant of Buckinghamshire, Lancashire, Cheshire and Herefordshire. On his death the titles passed to his eldest son, the third Earl. He was a Whig politician and served as First Lord of Trade and as First Lord of the Admiralty. His eldest son from his first marriage, John Egerton, died as an infant, while his two elder sons from his second marriage, Charles Egerton, Viscount Brackley, and the Hon. Thomas Egerton, both died in the fire which destroyed Bridgwater House in London. Lord Bridgewater was succeeded by his eldest surviving son from his second marriage, the fourth Earl. He served as Lord-Lieutenant of Buckinghamshire and also held several positions at court. In 1720 he was created Marquess of Brackley, in the County of Northampton, and Duke of Bridgewater, in the County of Somerset. Both titles were in the Peerage of Great Britain.

The first Duke outlived his two elder sons and was succeeded by his second but eldest surviving son from his second marriage, the second Duke. He died from fever at an early age. On his death the titles passed to his younger brother, the third Duke. He is remembered as the father of British inland navigation and commissioned the Bridgewater Canal, said to be the first true canal in Britain and the modern world. Bridgewater never married and on his death in 1803 the marquessate and dukedom became extinct.

The last Duke was succeeded in the other titles by his first cousin once removed, the seventh Earl. He was the son of the Right Reverend the Hon. John Egerton, Bishop of Durham, son of the Right Reverend the Hon. Henry Egerton, Bishop of Hereford, youngest son of the third Earl. Lord Bridgewater was a General in the Army and also sat as Tory Member of Parliament for Morpeth and for Brackley. He was childless and on his death in 1823 the titles passed to his younger brother, the eighth Earl. He was known as a patron of science as well as a great eccentric. Lord Bridgewater never married and on his death in 1829 his titles became extinct.

In the early 17th century, Thomas Egerton, 1st Viscount Brackley, had purchased Ashridge House in Hertfordshire, one of the largest country houses in England, from Queen Elizabeth I, who had inherited it from her father who had appropriated it after the dissolution of the monasteries in 1539. Ashridge House served the Egerton family as a residence until the 19th century. The Egertons later had a family chapel (the Bridgewater Chapel) with burial vault in Little Gaddesden Church, where many monuments commemorate the Dukes and Earls of Bridgewater and their families. Among those buried here is the 3rd Duke of Bridgewater.

Lady Amelia Egerton, sister of the seventh and eighth Earls, married Sir Abraham Hume, 2nd Baronet. Their daughter Sophia Hume married John Cust, 1st Earl Brownlow. Their grandson John William Spencer Brownlow Egerton-Cust, 2nd Earl Brownlow (1842–1867), assumed the additional surname of Egerton and inherited the Bridgewater estates after a lengthy lawsuit (see the Baron Brownlow for additional information on the Cust family). Also, Lady Louisa Egerton, daughter of the first Duke of Bridgewater, married Granville Leveson-Gower, 1st Marquess of Stafford. Their son George Leveson-Gower, 2nd Marquess of Stafford, was created Duke of Sutherland in 1833. His second son Lord Francis Leveson-Gower assumed by Royal licence the surname of Egerton in lieu of Leveson-Gower according to the will of the third Duke of Bridgewater. In 1846 the Brackley and Ellesmere titles were revived when he was made Viscount Brackley and Earl of Ellesmere. The Hon. Thomas Egerton, of Tatton Park, Cheshire, youngest son of the second Earl of Bridgewater, was the grandfather of Hester Egerton (d. 1780). She married William Tatton. In 1780 they assumed by Royal licence the surname of Egerton in lieu of Tatton. Their great-grandson William Tatton Egerton was created Baron Egerton in 1859.

The original spelling is likely to have been Bridgwater, meaning the burg of Water, and the same as Bridgwater in Somerset (see archive reference 2/79).

== In literature ==
In Mark Twain's Adventures of Huckleberry Finn (1885), set in 1840s America, Huck encounters two odd characters who turn out to be professional con men. One of them claims that he should be treated with deference, since he is "really" an impoverished Duke of Bridgwater, and the other, not to be outdone, reveals that he is "really" the Dauphin of France "Looy the Seventeen, son of Looy the Sixteen and Marry Antonet".

== Holders of the title ==
Arms of Baron Daubeney, also known as Dabney. Not to be confused with their cousins, the Abney and Abney-Hastings family. Coat of arms: Gules, 4 fusils conjoined in fess argent. The arms are derived from their ancestral home of Saint-Aubin-d'Aubigné.

=== Daubeny family ===
==== Barons Daubeney (1486) ====
- Giles Daubeney, 1st Baron Daubeney (d. 1508)
- Henry Daubeney, 2nd Baron Daubeney (1494–1548) (created Earl of Bridgewater in 1538)

==== Earls of Bridgewater, First Creation (1538) ====
- Henry Daubeney, 1st Earl of Bridgewater (1493–1548)

=== Egerton family ===
Arms of Egerton: Argent, a lion rampant gules between three pheons sable

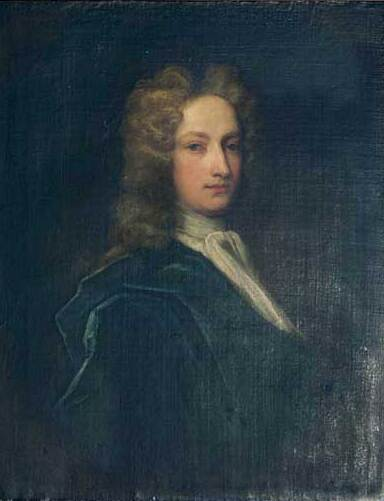
Scroop Egerton, 1st Duke of Bridgewater

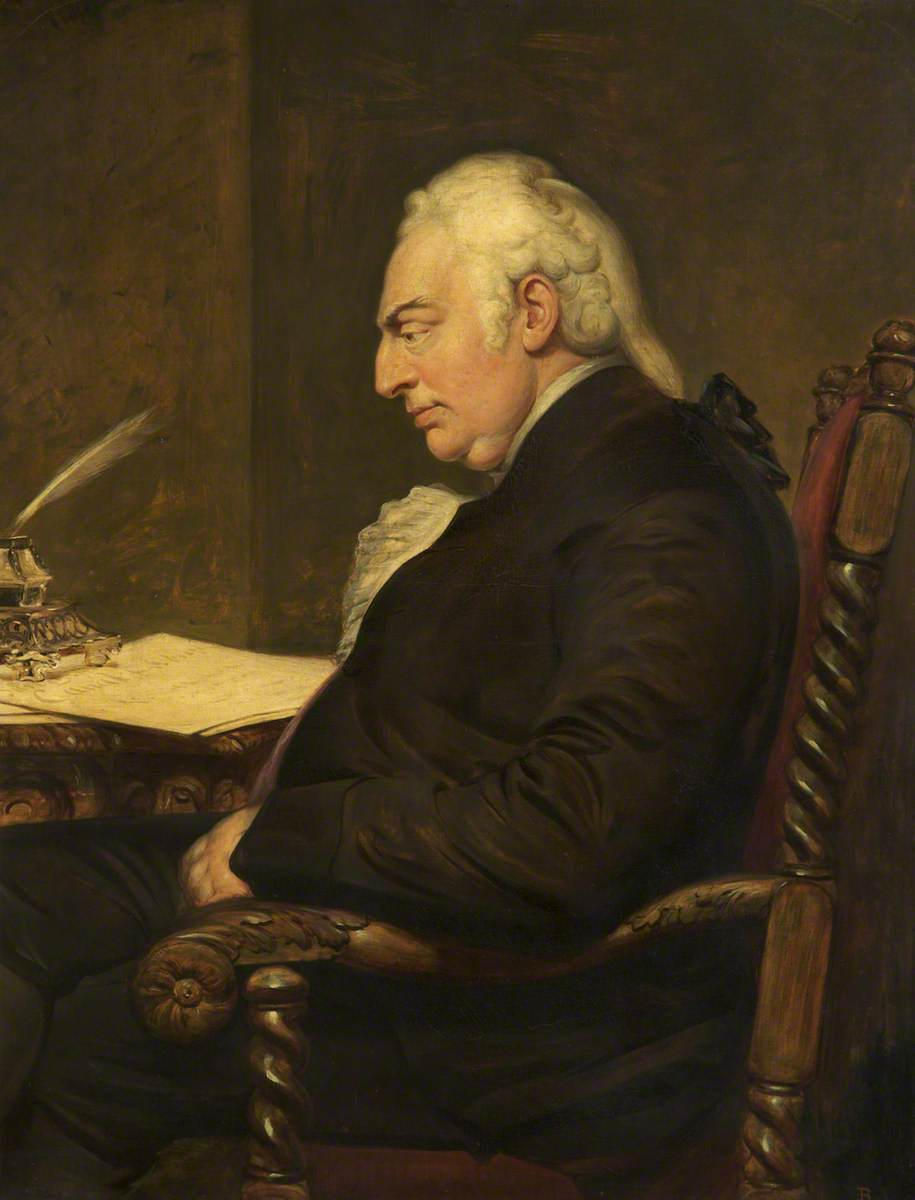
Francis Egerton, 3rd Duke of Bridgewater

==== Earls of Bridgewater, Second Creation (1617) ====
Other titles: Baron Ellesmere (1603) and Viscount Brackley (1616)

- John Egerton, 1st Earl of Bridgewater, 2nd Viscount Brackley (1579–1649), second son of Thomas Egerton, 1st Viscount Brackley and 1st Baron Ellesmere
  - James Egerton, Viscount Brackley (1616–1620), his eldest son, who died in childhood
  - Charles Egerton, Viscount Brackley (c. 1617–1623), his next brother, who also died in childhood
- John Egerton, 2nd Earl of Bridgewater (1623–1686), his only adult brother
- John Egerton, 3rd Earl of Bridgewater (1646–1701), his eldest son
  - Hon. John Egerton (1669–1670), his eldest son, who died in infancy
  - Charles Egerton, Viscount Brackley (1675–1687), his younger half-brother, who died in childhood
- Scroop Egerton, 4th Earl of Bridgewater (1681–1745), his younger brother, who was created Duke of Bridgewater and Marquess of Brackley in 1720
  - John Egerton, Viscount Brackley (1704–1719), his eldest son, who died before adulthood

==== Dukes of Bridgewater (1720) ====
Other titles: Baron Ellesmere (1603), Viscount Brackley (1616), Earl of Bridgewater (1617) and Marquess of Brackley (1720)

- Scroop Egerton, 1st Duke of Bridgewater, 4th Earl of Bridgewater (1681–1745)
- John Egerton, 2nd Duke of Bridgewater, 5th Earl of Bridgewater (1727–1748), his son, who died young and unmarried
- Francis Egerton, 3rd Duke of Bridgewater, 6th Earl of Bridgewater (1736–1803), his younger brother, who also died unmarried

==== Earls of Bridgewater, Second creation (1617; Reverted) ====
Other titles: Baron Ellesmere (1603) and Viscount Brackley (1616)

- John William Egerton, 7th Earl of Bridgewater (1753–1823), great-grandson of the 3rd Earl (via John Egerton, Bishop of Durham, and Henry Egerton, Bishop of Hereford)
- Francis Henry Egerton, 8th Earl of Bridgewater (1756–1829), his younger brother, who died without heirs

== Family tree ==
Family tree of the Barons Daubeney, Earls of Bridgewater, and Dukes of Bridgewater

Baron Daubeney (by writ), 1486
Giles Daubeney; 1451–1508; 1st Baron Daubeney
Earl of Bridgewater (1st creation), 1538
Henry Daubeney; 1493–1548; 1st Earl of Bridgewater, 2nd Baron Daubeney
Earldom of Bridgewater and Barony Daubeney extinct, 1548
Baron Ellesmere, 1603; Viscount Brackley, 1616
Thomas Egerton; 1540–1617; 1st Viscount Brackley, etc.
Earl of Bridgewater (2nd creation), 1617
John Egerton; 1579–1649; 1st Earl of Bridgewater, 2nd Viscount Brackley, etc.
John Egerton; 1623–1686; 2nd Earl of Bridgewater, 3rd Viscount Brackley, etc.
John Egerton; 1646–1701; 3rd Earl of Bridgewater, 4th Viscount Brackley, etc.
Duke of Bridgewater and Marquess of Brackley, 1720
Scroop Egerton; 1681–1745; 1st Duke of Bridgewater, etc., 4th Earl of Bridgewater, 5th Viscount Brackley, etc.	Henry Egerton; 1689–1746
John Egerton; 1727–1748; 2nd Duke of Bridgewater, etc., 5th Earl of Bridgewater, 6th Viscount Brackley, etc.	Francis Egerton; 1736–1803; 3rd Duke of Bridgewater, etc., 6th Earl of Bridgewater, 7th Viscount Brackley, etc.	John Egerton; 1721–1787
John William Egerton; 1753–1823; 7th Earl of Bridgewater, 8th Viscount Brackley, etc.	Francis Henry Egerton; 1756–1829; 8th Earl of Bridgewater, 9th Viscount Brackley, etc.
All titles extinct, 1803

== See also ==
- Countess of Bridgewater
- Baron Brownlow
- Viscount Brackley
- Earl of Ellesmere
