= Albini =

Albini or de Albini (of white) is a surname. Notable people with the surname include:

- Abramo Albini (born 1948), Italian Olympic rower
- Alessandro Albini (1568–1646), Italian painter
- Alfred Albini (1896–1978), Croatian architect
- Carlo Albini (1914–1976), Italian footballer
- Franco Albini (1905–1977), Italian architect and designer
- Franz von Albini (1748–1816), German judge and statesman
- Giuseppe Albini (admiral) (1780–1859), Italian admiral and senator
- Giuseppe Albini (1827–1911), Italian physician
- Giuseppe Albini (philologist) (1863–1933), Italian philologist, latinist and politician
- Septimiu Albini (1861–1919), Romanian journalist and activist
- Srećko Albini (1869–1933), Croatian composer, conductor, and music publisher
- Steve Albini (1962–2024), American singer-songwriter and recording engineer
- Umberto Albini (1895-1973), Italian Fascist politician
- Walter Albini pseudonym of Gualtiero Angelo Albini (1941–1983), Italian fashion designer

== See also ==
- Albini-Braendlin rifle, a single-shot Belgian rifle adopted in 1867
- William d'Aubigny (disambiguation)
