= Thomas Egerton (killed 1599) =

English landowner, soldier and politician

Sir Thomas Egerton MP
- Egerton arms: Argent a lion rampant gules between three pheons sable

Member of Parliament for Cheshire
- In office 1597–1598

Military service
- Allegiance: England
- Branch/service: Marines
- Rank: Captain
- Battles/wars: Azores (1597); Ireland (1599)

Sir Thomas Egerton (born 1574, Cheshire – killed 1599, Ireland) was an English landowner, soldier and politician who represented Cheshire in the House of Commons from 1597 to 1598.

== Life ==
The elder son of Sir Thomas Egerton (later Viscount Brackley), he was educated at Lincoln's Inn before going up to Brasenose College, Oxford (graduating BA 1591).

Seated at Dodleston-in-Ridley in Cheshire and heir to his family's other estates in neighbouring counties, Egerton was appointed a Justice of the Peace for Denbighshire and Flintshire in 1591 and for Cheshire in 1592. He then became Clerk to the Exchequer of Chester in 1595, before being returned de jure patris to Parliament in 1597.

With England under continued attack by Spain, in 1597 Egerton embarked on the Azores expedition and served with distinction. He received the accolade of the realm and, in 1599, was commissioned as Captain to muster Cheshire militiamen for serving in Ireland under the Earl of Essex. During the Irish campaign, Egerton was killed in action, his body being returned for burial at St Mary's Church, Dodleston, with full military honours.

== Family ==
In 1591, Egerton married Elizabeth Venables, daughter of Thomas Venables, of Kinderton Hall, Cheshire (and aunt of Peter Venables MP), by whom he had three daughters (Elizabeth Dutton, Vere Booth, and Mary Leigh). Lady Egerton, his dowager, remained resident at Ridley Hall, Cheshire until her death.

Predeceasing his father, Sir Thomas' younger brother, the Hon. John Egerton, succeeded to his father's peerage titles (Baron Ellesmere, cr. 1603; Viscount Brackley, cr. 1616) in 1617, being further created Earl of Bridgewater.

== See also ==
- Egerton family
- Sir Ralph Egerton (great-grandfather)
