= Phantom Head =

Studio album by the Scaramanga Six
- Released: 2013
- Genres: Alternative rock; art rock; psychobilly
- Length: 54:39
- Label: Wrath
- Producer: Steve Albini

The Scaramanga Six chronology
Cursed (2011)	Phantom Head (2013)	Scenes of Mild Peril – The Scaramanga Six Live in Session 2013–2014 (2014)

Phantom Head is the seventh album by English rock group the Scaramanga Six.

== Background ==
In 2012, the Scaramanga Six used a crowd-sourcing initiative to raise funds to travel to Chicago and record with Steve Albini. For these sessions, the band expanded to a sextet for the first time since 2002, with the usual quartet of the Morricone brothers, Julia Arnez and Gareth Champion augmented by a second drummer (Steve Gilchrist, who'd played stints with the band on previous occasions) and James Kenosha on piano (who'd previously both produced and drummed for the band)

In keeping with Albini's audio verité production ethos, the band recorded live to two-track tape. The session involved few overdubs. A follow-up session was recorded later in the year, with further vocals being recorded. The completed Phantom Head was released in April 2013. The six-piece lineup of the Scaramanga Six played concerts to support the album before reverting to the standard quartet lineup in 2014.

== Reception ==
The album was well received by press. In the national media, The Sun gave Phantom Head a four-out-of-five rating and said "this self-styled evil pop-group persist in producing great albums that demand loudly – to be heard.″ The Quietus described it as "another great album from a band that really deserve a much bigger audience." Louder Than War wrote "the guitars are tight, the melodies are memorable and effective and the production is spot on."

Vibrations hailed the album as a release which "must surely rank amongst their finest work to date". Splizz Magazine noted "dark sounding art rock songs that sound like Nick Cave crossed with The Editors" while Pure Rawk said: "think bands like Magazine and Wire or even Bowie's Berlin output with a fixation on death, murder and dystopia and you wouldn’t be far off the mark. Unsettling, but brilliant stuff." Soundsphere wrote that "The Scaramanga Six produce a sound which conveys similarities to The Stranglers at their best and vocals as powerful as Bowie back in the day."

Unpeeled described Phantom Head as "a top notch, modern rock record." while Contact Music said "if you like your music somewhat dark and bizarre, Phantom Head has a great deal to offer you." and Counterfeit Magazine said: "from smooth keys to dirty rock guitars, dark soundscapes to edgy punk, there’s something for everyone... Highly recommended." Entertainment Focus described the album as "one huge, often sad, dark and angry rant... and it’s something that we love."

Soundblab commented "the album’s energy-levels are frequently manic, and you can positively feel the intelligence of its makers behind the riffs." My Dad Rocks said: "It’s this kind of touch and skill, in both delivery and recording, that means this album rates highly amongst the swathe of indie rock offerings out recently." Awarding eleven marks out of thirteen, Room 13 congratulated the band on "eclectic brilliance″ while 7 Bit Arcade concluded "while some bands falter with age, and some just fade away, there’s no such fate for the Morricones & Co., who simply go from strength to strength." Beat 2 a Chord observed "for lovers of punk/rock/metal and everything in between, Scaramanga Six have a clear talent for genre-blending and story-telling throughout their music" and congratulated the band for "continuing to push their boundaries and deliver something fresh years after their formation. Hats off to them."

== Track listing ==
All tracks are written by Paul Morricone/Steven Morricone.

No.	Title	Length
1.	"I Will Crush Your Heart"	5:42
2.	"I Am the Rain"	4:39
3.	"The Bristol Butcher"	4:55
4.	"Blunt Force Trauma"	3:40
5.	"The Spider"	4:04
6.	"We Are the Blind"	5:27
7.	"They Put You On a Pedestal"	4:14
8.	"Twist the Knife"	3:45
9.	"Missing"	4:09
10.	"The Cardinal"	3:09
11.	"It's Just a Matter of Time"	6:16
12.	"The Stepford Bands"	4:39

== Personnel ==
- Paul Morricone – vocals, guitars, baritone saxophone
- Steven Morricone – vocals, bass guitar, tenor saxophone
- Julia Arnez– guitars, vocals
- James Kenosha – piano
- Gareth Champion - drums
- Stephen Gilchrist - drums
