= Abney (surname) =

Abney is an English surname, which evolved in spelling from the surname D'Aubigny. The name originated from meaning "of" or "from" Saint-Aubin-d'Aubigné (now in Ille-et-Vilaine department). Notable people with the surname include:

- Derek Abney (born 1980), American footballer
- Don Abney (1923–2000), American jazz pianist
- Keith Abney II (born 2005), American football player
- Larry Abney (born 1977), American basketball player
- Mary Abney (1676–1750), English aristocrat
- Sir Thomas Abney (1640–1722), Lord Mayor of London
- Thomas Abney (judge) (1690 or 1691 – 1750), English barrister and judge
- William de Wiveleslie Abney (1844–1920), English chemist and educationist

== See also ==
- Abney (disambiguation)
- Abney-Hastings
