= John Egerton, 7th Earl of Bridgewater =

British soldier and politician (1753–1823)

General The Right Honourable The Earl of Bridgewater FRS
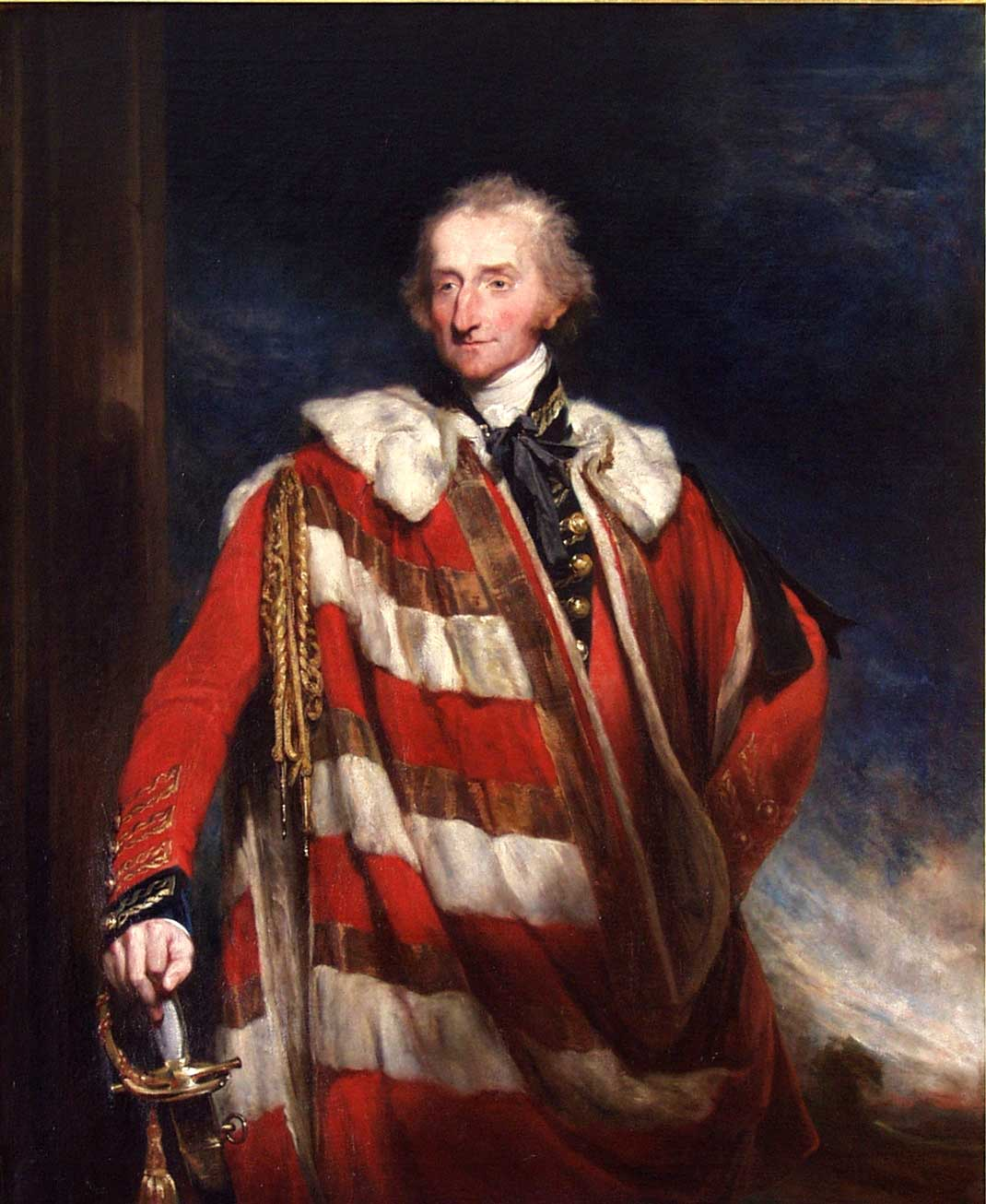
- Portrait by William Owen, 1817

Member of Parliament for Brackley
- In office 1780–1803
- Preceded by: William Egerton
- Succeeded by: Anthony Henderson

Member of Parliament for Morpeth
- In office 1777–1780
- Preceded by: Gilbert Elliot
- Succeeded by: Anthony Morris Storer

Personal details
- Born: 14 April 1753
- Died: 21 October 1823 (aged 70)
- Party: Tory
- Spouse: Charlotte Haynes (m. 1783)
- Parent(s): John Egerton; Anne Grey
- Occupation: Cavalry officer

John William Egerton, 7th Earl of Bridgewater, FRS (14 April 1753 – 21 October 1823), known as John Egerton until 1803, was a British cavalry officer, and Tory politician who sat in the House of Commons from 1777 to 1803 when he succeeded to the peerage as Earl of Bridgewater. He was from the Egerton family.

== Biography ==
Egerton was the eldest son of the Right Reverend John Egerton, Bishop of Durham, and the grandson of the Right Reverend Henry Egerton, Bishop of Hereford, youngest son of John Egerton, 3rd Earl of Bridgewater. His mother was Lady Anne Sophia Grey.

He joined the British Army in 1771 and was promoted to captain in 1776, to major in 1779, and to lieutenant-colonel in 1790. He was promoted to colonel of 7th Light Dragoons in 1793, but in 1797 transferred to be Colonel of 14th Light Dragoons, serving under Major-general Craufurd during the Peninsular War to great acclaim. He remained colonel of the 14th Dragoons for the rest of his life and was promoted major-general in 1795, lieutenant-general in 1802 and full general in 1812.

Egerton also sat as a Tory Member of Parliament for Morpeth from 1777 to 1780 and for Brackley from 1780 to 1803. The latter year, on the death of his first cousin once removed, Francis Egerton, 3rd Duke of Bridgewater, he succeeded as seventh Earl of Bridgewater.

He was elected a Fellow of the Royal Society in 1808. and a Fellow of the Society of Antiquaries (F.S.A.) on 4 February 1808.

Lord Bridgewater died in October 1823, aged 70. On 14 January 1783 he had married Charlotte Catherine Anne (died 1849 aged 85), only daughter and heir of Samuel Haynes. Their marriage was childless, and therefore his younger brother Francis inherited the title of Earl of Bridgewater. Egerton left his estates in Bedfordshire, Buckinghamshire, Cheshire, Durham, Flintshire, Hertfordshire, Middlesex, Northamptonshire, Oxfordshire, Shropshire and Yorkshire to John, Viscount Alford, provided he had managed to become Duke or Marquess of Bridgwater with a suitable remainder. John did not fulfil the proviso in the will, failing in court to persuade the judge. However his heir got the clause declared illegal, so the 2nd Earl Brownlow commenced a damaging and lengthy case of litigation that in 1851 resulted in the Egerton family forfeiting the estates.

== Monuments and memorials ==
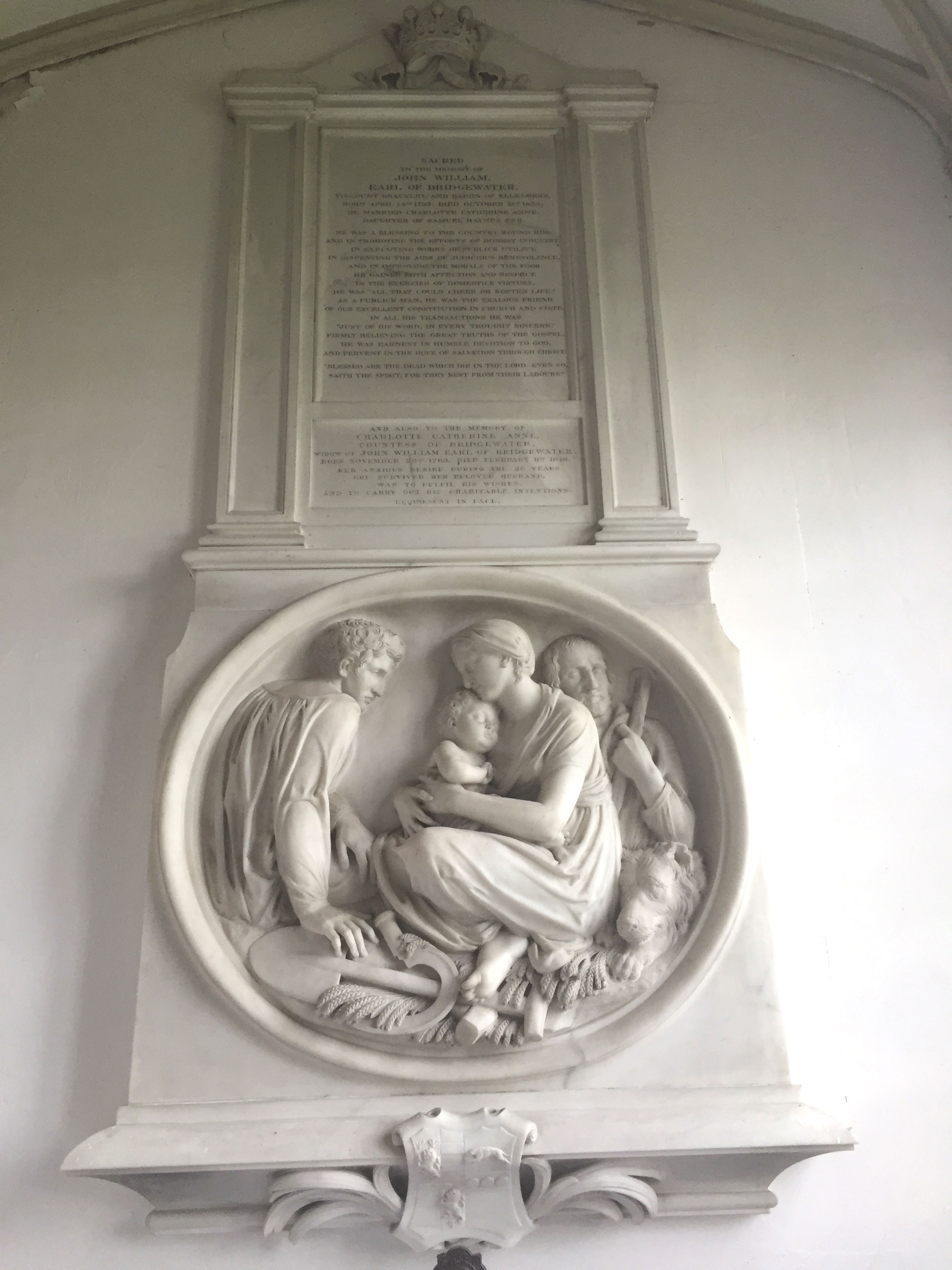
Memorial to the 7th Earl of Bridgewater and Charlotte Anne in the Bridgewater Chapel at St. Peter and St. Paul Church, Little Gaddesden, where many Egerton family members are buried

Lord Bridgewater is commemorated by a memorial at the Bridgewater Chapel at St. Peter and St. Paul Church, Little Gaddesden. In the early 17th century, Thomas Egerton, 1st Viscount Brackley, had purchased Ashridge House, one of the largest country houses in England, from Queen Elizabeth I, who had inherited it from her father Henry VIII, who had appropriated it after the dissolution of the monasteries in 1539. Ashridge House served the Egerton family as a residence until the 19th century. The Egertons later had a family chapel with burial vault in Little Gaddesden Church, where many monuments commemorate the Dukes and Earls of Bridgewater and their families.

== Notes ==
Parliament of Great Britain
Preceded by Peter Delmé; Gilbert Elliot	Member of Parliament for Morpeth; 1777–1780; With: Peter Delmé	Succeeded by Peter Delmé; Anthony Morris Storer
Preceded by William Egerton; Timothy Caswall	Member of Parliament for Brackley; 1780–1801; With: Timothy Caswall 1780–1789; Samuel Haynes 1789–1801	Parliament of the United Kingdom
Parliament of the United Kingdom
Preceded by Parliament of Great Britain	Member of Parliament for Brackley; 1801–1803; With: Samuel Haynes 1801–1802; Robert Haldane Bradshaw 1802–1803	Succeeded by Robert Haldane Bradshaw; Anthony Henderson
Peerage of England
Preceded by Francis Egerton	Earl of Bridgewater; 2nd creation 1803–1823	Succeeded by Francis Henry Egerton
Military offices
Preceded by Robert Sloper	Colonel of the 14th (The Duchess of York's Own); Regiment of (Light) Dragoons; 1797–1823	
