= Caswall =

Caswall is an English surname. Notable people with the surname include:

- Edward Caswall (1814–1878), British clergyman and hymn writer
- George Caswall (died 1742), British banker and politician
- Timothy Caswall (c. 1733–1802), British Army officer and politician
