= Pasquale Sfameni =

Italian physician and scientist

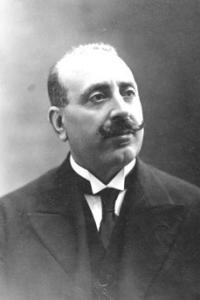

Rector of the Alma Mater Studiorum University of Bologna
- In office 1923–1927
- Preceded by: Leone Pesci
- Succeeded by: Giuseppe Albini

Personal details
- Born: 30 October 1868 Torregrotta, Italy
- Died: 7 October 1955 (aged 86) Torregrotta, Italy
- Education: Degree in Medicine
- Alma mater: University of Bologna
- Profession: Physician, University professor

Pasquale Sfameni (30 October 1868, Torregrotta, Italy – 7 October 1955, Torregrotta, Italy) was an Italian physician and scientist.

== Biography ==
Born in Torregrotta in 1868 into a bourgeois family, he graduated from the University of Bologna in 1893 with a thesis on artificial and cadaveric alterations of the central and peripheral nervous system. He later moved to Pisa, where he pursued an academic career, becoming a student of Ermanno Pinzani in specialized studies in obstetrics from 1895 to 1905. He then became a professor at the Universities of Perugia, Cagliari, Messina, and Parma. In 1918, he returned as a full professor to Bologna where he founded the journal Monitore Ostetrico, concurrently becoming the director of the Obstetrics Clinic until 1936. From 1923 to 1927, he served as the Rector of the University of Bologna. He was also a member of the Italian Society for the Progress of Sciences and from 1947 to 1949, of the Academy of Sciences of Bologna. In 1940, together with his wife, he donated all his writings and much of his real estate to the University of Bologna, which used them to establish the Pasquale Sfameni Foundation. The foundation awards an international quinquennial prize and several annual scholarships. He returned to his hometown of Torregrotta in 1948, where he died in 1955.

A Freemason, he was a member of the Bologna lodge "VIII Agosto" of the Ancient and Accepted Scottish Rite belonging to the Grand Orient of Italy, from which he resigned in 1925.

== Major contributions ==
Pasquale Sfameni is internationally known for his research on pregnancy and childbirth, which led him, in 1922, to the publication of the theory on the Utero-Ovarian Revolution and the active dilation of the uterus. His studies focused on the female egg cell and the origin and development of the placenta, demonstrating the endocrine nature of the decidua basalis. His studies on vesicovaginal fistulae, which he successfully treated for the first time through surgical intervention, are also noteworthy. The body of his major works is known in medical literature as the Humoral Hormonal Doctrine of Sfameni.

== Works ==
- Commemorazione del Prof. Giovanni Calderini (1922)

== Honours ==
- Commander of the Order of the Crown of Italy – 20 December 1924
- Officer of the Order of Saints Maurice and Lazarus
- Order of San Marino
- Commander of the Civil Order of Alfonso X, the Wise

== Bibliography ==
- Luigi Bacialli. "Brief biography of Pasquale Sfameni" (PDF). archiviostorico.unibo.it. University of Bologna. Bacialli, 1955.
- Paolo Gaifami. "Pasquale Sfameni". treccani.it. Treccani Encyclopedia. Gaifami, 1936.
