= Lord Ellesmere =

Lord Ellesmere may refer to:

- Baron Ellesmere, title created 1603, later a subsidiary to the first creation of Viscount Brackley
- Earl of Ellesmere, title created 1846, with the second creation of Viscount Brackley a subsidiary
