= William Egerton (disambiguation) =

William Egerton may refer to:

- Sir William Egerton (1649–1691) English politician
- William Egerton (1684–1732), English Army officer and MP
- William Egerton, originally William Tatton, (1749–1806), English politician
- William Egerton (died 1783) English politician
- William Egerton, 1st Baron Egerton (1806–1883)
- Bill Egerton (1944–2019) English politician
