= Abney =

Abney may refer to:

== Places ==
- Abney, Derbyshire, a village in the county of Derbyshire, England
- Abney, West Virginia, a locality in Raleigh County, West Virginia, US
- Abney Grange, a village in the county of Derbyshire, England

== Other uses ==
- Abney (surname), includes a list of people with the name
- Abney effect, a colour-related phenomenon

== See also ==
- Abney Park
- Abney Hall
- Abney and Abney Grange
- Topographic Abney level
