= Bridgewater Square =

Residential square in London, England

Coordinates: 51.5211°N 0.0956°W

Bridgewater Square is a residential square in the ward of Aldersgate in the City of London. (Note: Before 2013, the ward of Cripplegate.) It was formed from the gardens of the former mansion Bridgewater House, long the home of the Earls of Bridgewater, which was destroyed by fire in 1687 when the then Earl's sons, Charles Egerton, styled Viscount Brackley, aged 11, and his younger brother, Thomas Egerton, aged 8, and their tutor were all burnt to death. The mansion, which was not rebuilt, had been on the east side of Aldersgate Street, near the Barbican, with gardens on the south side of the house.

== History ==
Later historians of the area quoted by John James Baddeley in his Cripplegate (1921) show that in 1756 the square was "A very handsome open space ...The middle is neatly enclosed with palisado pales and set around with trees, which renders the place very delightful". In 1806, "the centre of the square is a grass plot, shaded with trees, and encompassed by iron rails". In 1817 there were twenty-two houses around the square, including the businesses of fifteen traders, who (as Baddeley wrote) "probably resided over their workshops", but in the following century the surrounding area was increasingly covered with poorer housing, which in turn was being replaced by high warehouses. William Miller of H.M. India Office wrote in 1867, "The once charming grounds and plantations annexed to Bridgewater House are now covered with blocks of houses let out in tenements to the working classes, and although still bearing the high sounding names of Bridgewater Gardens and Brackley Street, with their courts and alleys, present a dingy and ill-conditioned appearance."

In 1865 Cripplegate Boys' School took a tall building on the north corner of the square, and for many years the central area was used as a drill ground by its 300 boys, until it closed in 1904 and was replaced by another warehouse. The school's neighbour to the west was the six-floor emporium of Moritz Wolfsky, a renowned leather travelling bag and dressing case maker originally from Frankfort who in 1881 employed here 87 people in his newly erected workrooms, but ceased trading in 1908. On the south side of the square five four-storey houses were occupied from 1859 by George Tranter's temperance hotel. After the closure of the school, the garden was let to Tranter's Hotel for the use of his guests, but the hotel closed early in the First World War and the garden's railed enclosure was given over to the cultivation of vegetables. Baddeley wrote in 1921 that there was "an especially fine lime tree" there.

== 20th century onwards ==
In 1925 there was a campaign to save the central garden from development and to keep it as a public open space. As a result, the square was acquired for £5,000 by public subscription and opened on 15 October 1928 for use by local workers. This anticipated a wider involvement which culminated in the passing of the London Squares Preservation Act 1931, "to provide for the preservation and restricting the user of certain squares gardens and enclosures in the administrative county of London and for other purposes", in which the "Garden enclosure bounded on all sides by the roadway of Bridgewater Square" formed the first item in the Schedules incorporated in the Act.

Section 3(1) of the Act stated that such squares can only be used for "authorized play, rest or recreation". No structures can be erected or placed on or over any protected square unless it is necessary or convenient, or in connection with the use and maintenance of the square for the authorized purposes. Section 3(10) of the Act provides that an offence is committed if the provisions of the Act are breached. There is a statutory duty under Section 11 to enforce the Act. Every person who fails to comply with its provision is liable to a penalty "not exceeding twenty pounds and to a daily penalty not exceeding the like amount".

An article, "London Day by Day; City's Open Spaces", in the Edinburgh Evening News for 27 January 1934 commended the Corporation of the City of London as keen to preserve every open space, saying that this "little oasis" had been threatened by building operations nearby and that "the City Corporation stepped in and not only secured the area for the work people in the neighbourhood but laid it out as a garden and erected a shelter".

During the Second World War, the area was almost obliterated by bombing. Immediately after, the ruined premises facing the square were compulsorily purchased by order of the Court of Common Council under the Acquisition of Land (Authorisation Procedure) Act 1946, but no mention was made of the central garden; and an article by the London Parks & Gardens Trust, in 2013, London Gardens Trust noted that the square is "now essentially part of the Barbican Estate, it is used as a playground for a children's nursery", it having been leased to the Bright Horizons City Child Nursery. In the 2020s the whole of the remaining garden area was enclosed by a padlocked palisade nearly eight feet high. Several buildings were erected there (all said to be temporary and thus not needing planning permission), and a stair and ramp leading to the nursery's offices in Bunyan Court were built on its western side. As a result, the square is now inaccessible to the public.
