= London Squares Preservation Act 1931 =

Act of the Parliament of the United Kingdom

- Act of Parliament
- Parliament of the United Kingdom
- Long title: An Act to provide for the preservation and for restricting the user of certain squares gardens and enclosures in the administrative county of London and for other purposes.
- Citation: 21 & 22 Geo. 5. c. xciii

Dates
- Royal assent: 31 July 1931

Text of statute as originally enacted

The London Squares Preservation Act 1931 (21 & 22 Geo. 5. c. xciii) was an act of the Parliament of the United Kingdom that aimed to improve the protection afforded to squares in London.

This act was a result of the Royal Commission on London Squares. It introduced the term protected square and applied this to 461 named squares, gardens, and other enclosures within the County of London, including the City of London.

Protected squares can only be used for authorised purposes. These are "an ornamental garden, pleasure ground or ground for play, rest or recreation". Explicitly prohibited is the construction of any building or structure except as required for an authorised purpose.

== Protected squares ==
Squares listed in the schedule of the 1931 act are as follows.

- City of London: Bridgewater Square, Finsbury Circus, Inner Temple Garden, Middle Temple Garden, West Smithfield
- Holborn: Bedford Square, Gray's Inn Gardens, Gray's Inn Square, New Square, Lincoln's Inn, Old Buildings, Lincoln's Inn, Old Square, Lincoln's Inn, South Square, Gray's Inn, Woburn Square

== See also ==
- List of acts of the Parliament of the United Kingdom from 1931
