= Royal Commission on London Squares =

Government inquiry regarding the urban open spaces of London, England

The Royal Commission on London Squares, also known as the Londonderry Commission, was a royal commission created in 1927 regarding the urban open spaces of London, England. Its report in 1928 led to the enactment of the London Squares Preservation Act 1931 (21 & 22 Geo. 5. c. xciii).

The terms of reference of the commission were:

"To inquire and report on the squares and similar open spaces existing in the area of the administrative county of London with special reference to the conditions on which they are held and used and the desirability of their preservation as open spaces and to recommend whether any or all of them should be permanently safeguarded against any use detrimental to their character as open spaces, and, if so, by what means and on what terms and conditions."

The commission was chaired by Charles Vane-Tempest-Stewart, the Marquess of Londonderry.

== See also ==
- London Squares and Enclosures (Preservation) Act 1906 (6 Edw. 7. c. clxxxvii)
- London Squares Preservation Act 1931 (21 & 22 Geo. 5. c. xciii)
- Roosevelt Memorial Act 1946 (9 & 10 Geo. 6. c. 83)
