= D'Aubigny =

d'Aubigny may refer to:

== Places ==
- Saint-Martin-d'Aubigny,

== People ==
- Claude de Boutroue d'Aubigny
- Hugh d'Aubigny, 5th Earl of Arundel
- Julie d'Aubigny
- Nigel d'Aubigny
- Philip d'Aubigny (ca. 1166 – ca. 1236), knight and royal chancellor
- William d'Aubigny (disambiguation), several people:
  - William d'Aubigny (died 1139)
  - William d'Aubigny (Brito)
  - William d'Aubigny (rebel)
  - William d'Aubigny, 1st Earl of Arundel
  - William d'Aubigny, 2nd Earl of Arundel
  - William d'Aubigny, 3rd Earl of Arundel
  - William d'Aubigny, 4th Earl of Arundel

== Other ==
- Seigneur d'Aubigny,
