= Francis Egerton, 8th Earl of Bridgewater =

British eccentric

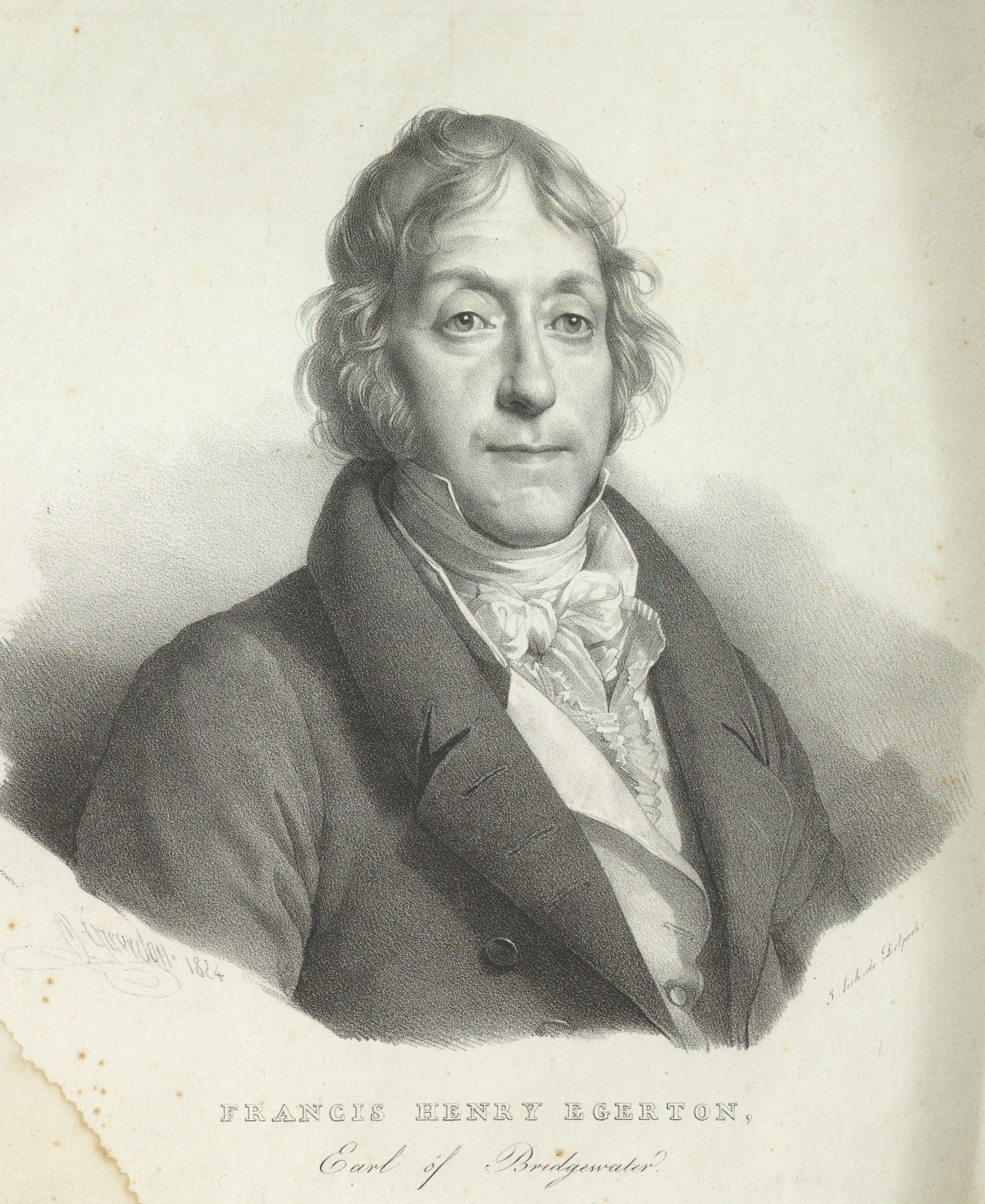
Francis Henry Egerton, 1824

Arms of the Earl of Bridgewater (Egerton family)

Francis Henry Egerton, 8th Earl of Bridgewater, FRS, FSA (11 November 1756 – 11 February 1829), known as Francis Egerton until 1823, was a British eccentric from the Egerton family and supporter of natural theology.

Bridgewater was a Church of England clergyman who held the rectories of Myddle (1781) and Whitchurch (1797) in Shropshire, but the duties were performed by a proxy. He succeeded his brother John in the earldom in 1823, and spent the latter part of his life in Paris. He was a fair scholar, and a zealous naturalist and antiquarian. When he died in February 1829 the earldom became extinct.

== Early life ==
Born in London in 1756, Bridgewater was the younger son of John Egerton, Bishop of Durham and Anne Sophia Grey. He was educated at Eton and Christ Church, Oxford where he gained his Bachelor of Arts in 1776, and became a fellow of All Souls in 1780, and Fellow of the Royal Society in 1781. He inherited his title and a large fortune in 1823 from his brother, the 7th Earl.

== Career ==
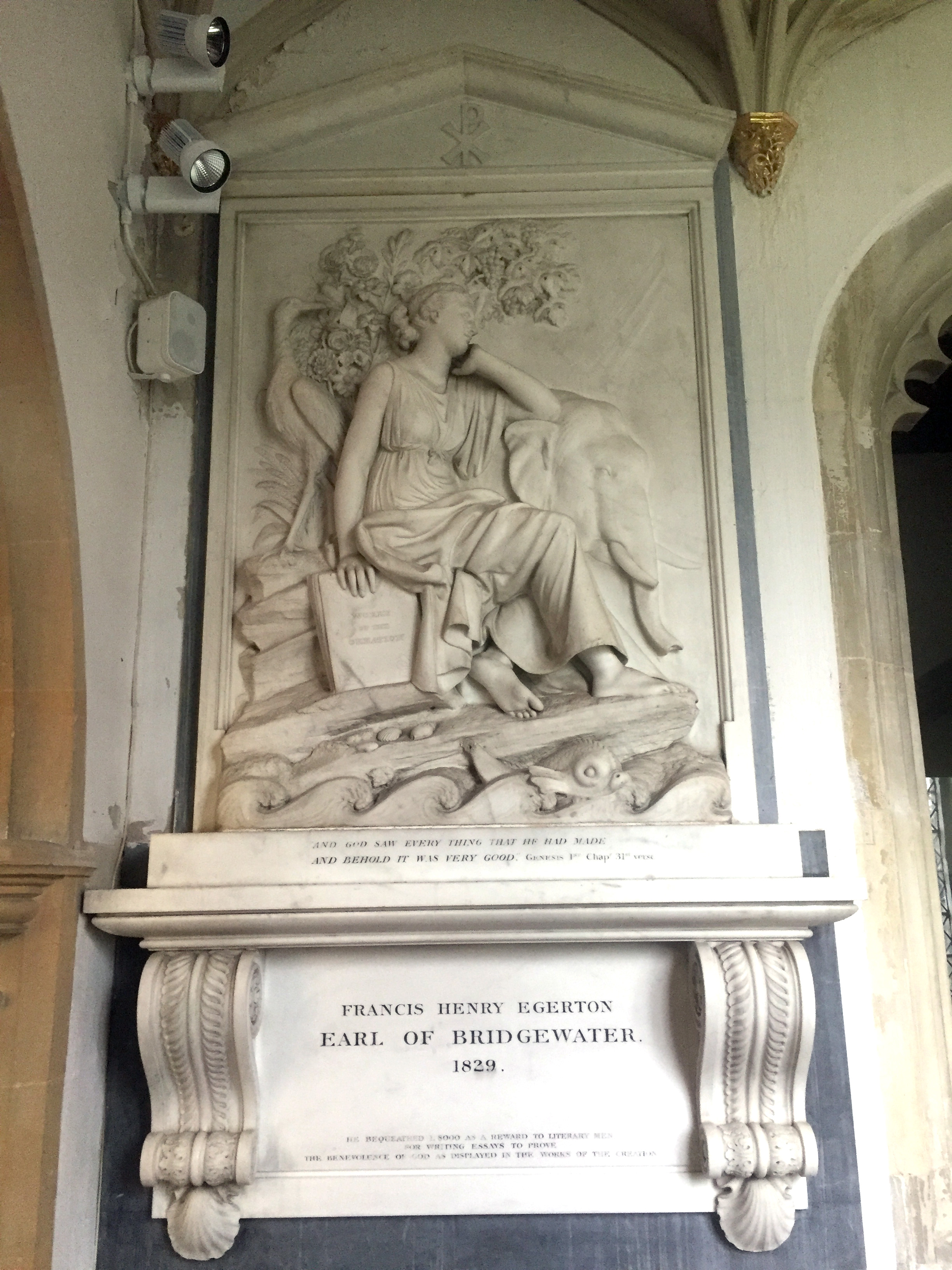
Memorial to Francis Egerton, 8th Earl of Bridgewater in the Bridgewater Chapel at St. Peter and St. Paul Church, Little Gaddesden, where many Egerton family members are buried

Bridgewater was eccentric. According to the Parisian police, Bridgewater kept dogs and cats in his house which he dressed as ladies and gentlemen and would take them with him in his carriage. He kept partridges and pigeons with clipped wings in his garden, allowing him to shoot them despite failing eyesight. He never married, and upon his death, his title became extinct. He was buried at Little Gaddesden, Hertfordshire.

In the early 17th century, Thomas Egerton, 1st Viscount Brackley, had purchased Ashridge House, one of the largest country houses in England, from Queen Elizabeth I, who had inherited it from her father who had appropriated it after the dissolution of the monasteries in 1539. Ashridge House served the Egerton family as a residence until the 19th century. The Egertons later had a family chapel (the Bridgewater Chapel) with burial vault in Little Gaddesden Church, where many monuments commemorate the Dukes and Earls of Bridgewater and their families.

== Arts and science ==
Bridgewater was invested as a Fellow of the Royal Society (F.R.S.) on 8 November 1781 and as a Fellow of the Society of Antiquaries of London (F.S.A.) on 31 March 1791.

In 1812, he wrote "Description du Plan Incliné Souterrain" about the underground canals of the Worsley Navigable Levels, coal mines in Worsley, Greater Manchester, part of the Bridgewater estate.

A Freemason who had been Initiated in France, from 10 August 1786 until 1800 Bridgewater was Provincial Grand Master for Shropshire and North Wales, adding Staffordshire, Flint, Denbighshire and Montgomeryshire to his responsibilities in 1791. For all that this was an extensive area, the duties associated with the position at that time were light, and in many cases (up to 1795) left in the hands of his Deputy/Provincial Grand Secretary Charles Shirreff. The Secretary of Whitchurch Lodge no. 1, John Collier, was one of the curates who deputised for Bridgewater at the church in the town.

== Bridgewater estate ==
At his death in Paris in 1829, Bridgewater's titles became extinct. He left the majority of his estates, including Ashridge, to John Hume Cust, Viscount Alford, heir to Earl Brownlow. Alford's grandmother was Lady Amelia Egerton, great-granddaughter of John Egerton, 3rd Earl of Bridgewater. The estates drew income of £70,000 annually (equivalent to £6,644,000 in 2025). However, Bridgewater left the estates with a peculiar stipulation: Alford could only keep them provided he be raised to the peerage as Duke or Marquess of Bridgewater, and that if he failed to do so, the estates would go to his younger brother the Hon. Charles Henry Cust, with the same requirement.

"Provided also, and I declare my will to be, that it shall happen that the said John Hume, Lord Viscount Alford shall not acquire the title and dignity of the Duke Marquis Bridgewater, to him or the heirs male of his body, with the immediate limitation over of such title and dignity to the said Charles Henry Cust and the heirs male of his body, or to the heirs male of his body if he shall be dead leaving issue male, and also, that the said Charles Henry Cust shall not acquire the title and dignity of Duke or of Bridgewater, to him and the heirs male of his body, then such case the use and estate hereinbefore directed be limited to the heirs male of the body of the said Charles Henry Cust shall cease and be absolutely void."

Alford assumed the name and arms of Egerton, but died in January 1851, aged only 38. His eldest son, John Brownlow Cust, just shy of 9 years old, adopted the Egerton surname as his father's heir. Charles Cust then adopted the surname Egerton and in February 1851 sued his nephew for the Bridgewater estates, as his brother had failed to meet the conditions of Bridgewater's will.

The court initially ruled in Charles Cust's favor. Lord Justice Lord Cranworth ruled in 1852 that as Alford had died without the title and dignity of Marquess or Duke of Bridgewater, therefore his heirs were not entitled to the estates. Alford's son, who succeeded his grandfather as 2nd Earl Brownlow in 1853, appealed the ruling to the House of Lords. The majority of the judges agreed with Cranworth's opinion that the estate should go in accordance with Bridgewater's wishes as outlined in his will. However, surprisingly, Lord Lyndhurst, Brougham, Truro, and St Leonards argued that the codicil was in fact illegal. They successfully argued that such a demand could lead to heirs acquiring peerages purely for financial gain, and thus the court allowing Bridgewater's request to stand went against the public good.

The duties of a peer were of grave and important character——he had duties the Legislature, as well those of judicial character to accomplish. Moreover, a peer had the right to demand audience of the Sovereign to offer his advice upon the subject of public affairs. These were high and important functions both as to power and as to duty. In those, as well political matters, a peer was bound to act free from any improper motive——least of all, ought there to be any motive of a pecuniary character to influence his movements in the discharge of the duties attached to his position and station. This was the position, these were the obligations and duties of peer. It followed, then, that any disposition of property which in any way tended to interfere with the discharge of those duties was at variance with the public good.

Brownlow's appeal was successful and Lord Cranworth's earlier ruling was reversed.

=== Bequests ===
Bridgewater bequeathed to the British Museum the valuable Egerton Manuscripts, consisting of 67 volumes and 96 charters dealing with the literature of France and Italy. Additionally, he left two bequests totalling £12,000 (equivalent to £1,139,000 in 2025) to establish the Egerton Fund from which the Museum could purchase additional manuscripts. More than 3,800 manuscripts have been purchased using the Egerton fund.

He also left £8,000 (equivalent to £759,000 in 2025) at the disposal of the president of the Royal Society, to be paid to the author or authors who might be selected to write and publish 1,000 copies of a treatise On the Power, Wisdom and Goodness of God, as manifested in the Creation. The resulting eight Bridgewater Treatises first appeared between 1833 and 1836, and afterwards in Bohn's Scientific Library.

== See also ==
- Egerton Collection

== Notes ==
Peerage of England
Preceded by John William Egerton	Earl of Bridgewater; 2nd creation 1823–1829	Extinct
