= Henry Daubeney, 1st Earl of Bridgewater =

Daubeney coat of arms. Derived from their ancestral home of Saint-Aubin-d'Aubigné.

Henry Daubeney – also known as, Dabney, 1st Earl of Bridgewater and 2nd Baron Daubeney (December 1493 – 8 April 1548) was an English peer who sat in the House of Lords.

== Origins ==
He was the son and heir of Giles, 1st Baron Daubeney, KG (1451–1508), by his wife Elizabeth Arundell, daughter of Sir John Arundell, of Lanherne, Cornwall.

== Childhood ==
His father had intended Henry before his sixteenth birthday to marry one of the daughters of Sir John Basset (1462–1528), of Tehidy in Cornwall, and Whitechapel in Devon, and at some time before December 1504 for that eventual purpose had taken into his household two of Basset's daughters, Anne Basset and Thomasine Basset, to give the 11 year-old Henry a choice for a future bride. However no such marriage took place, possibly due to his father's early death four years later in 1508 and Henry's subsequent entry into the wardship of his mother Elizabeth, who at the same time obtained his marriage "without disparagement", apparently an escape clause from the contract. In 1511 Anne Basset married James Courtenay, so it appears the contract had been abandoned by that time. The proposed Daubeney-Basset marriage was the result of Henry's father having invested heavily, in excess of 3,000 marks, to enable John Basset to redeem his substantial inheritance from the Beaumont family, comprising amongst others the Devonshire manors of Shirwell, Umberleigh and Heanton Punchardon. The redemption of these lands by Daubeney snr. was part of the "great indenture" of 11 December 1504 made with Basset, which would require ownership of the lands to descend to the male issue of the marriage between Henry Daubeney and one of the Basset daughters. Even though he had failed to meet his part of the bargain of marrying one of the Basset daughters, Henry spent considerable effort in later life trying to prevent the Basset family obtaining the reversion of these properties, as the indenture provided for. The dispute figures prominently in the Lisle Letters. Indeed, Henry tried to alienate the Beaumont lands to Edward Seymour, the queen's brother, then trying to build up a Devon estate, who was also a key influence in obtaining Henry's earldom.

== Career ==
In 1513 Lord Daubeney served at the Battle of the Spurs and in 1520 was present at the Field of the Cloth of Gold, together with his first wife, as well as at the Calais Congress of 1532. He was advanced as Earl of Bridgewater on 19 July 1538.

== Marriages ==
Henry married twice but left no children:

- Firstly to Elizabeth Neville, the daughter of George Neville, 5th Baron Bergavenny, by his first wife, Lady Joan FitzAlan (died 1508), daughter of Thomas FitzAlan, 17th Earl of Arundel, and Margaret Woodville (died 1492), second daughter of Richard Woodville, 1st Earl Rivers, and a younger sister of Elizabeth Woodville, wife of King Edward IV.
- Secondly to Lady Katherine Howard (died 1554), daughter of Thomas Howard, 2nd Duke of Norfolk by his second wife Agnes Tilney (died 1545). They married sometime after 1531, the year her first husband was executed. They quarreled by 1535 and sought a divorce.

== Death and succession ==
There was no issue from either marriage, and upon his death in 1548 the barony of Daubeney and the earldom of Bridgewater became extinct.

== Notes ==
Peerage of England
New creation	Earl of Bridgewater; 1st creation 1538–1548	Extinct
Preceded by Sir Giles Daubeney	Baron Daubeney; 1508–1548	Extinct
