= Giuseppe Albini =

Italian physiologist and physician

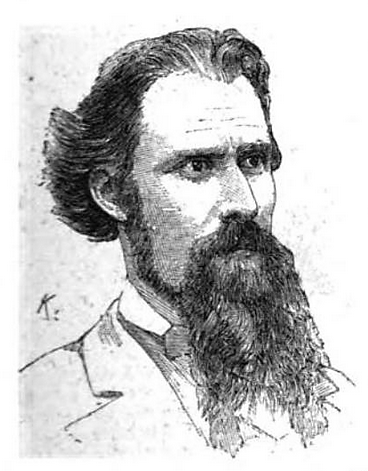
- Born: 27 September 1827; Milan, Italy
- Died: 18 January 1911 (aged 83); Turin, Italy
- Occupations: Physiologist, Physician

Giuseppe Albini (27 September 1827 – 18 January 1911) was an Italian physiologist and physician.

== Biography ==
Giuseppe Albini was born 27 September 1827 in Milan. In 1845, he began his medical studies in Pavia, where he attended Bartolomeo Panizza's anatomy courses. Expelled from Pavia for having taken part in the Springtime of the Peoples of 1848, he took part in the Five Days of Milan and the battle of Novara. Following these events, he went to Vienna, where he completed his medical studies and graduated in 1852. He became the student and then assistant of Ernst Wilhelm von Brücke, professor of physiology at the University of Vienna. He then left for Berlin, where he followed the lectures of Brücke's friend, Emil du Bois-Reymond, and Christian Gottfried Ehrenberg. Thereafter went to Bonn, Halle, and Utrecht. In October 1857, he was named professor of physiology at the University of Krakow. In 1859, Lombardy was liberated from the Austrians following the Armistice of Villafranca: Giuseppe Albini, despite his important position at the University of Krakow, resigned and returned to Italy to work as a natural history teacher at the secondary school of Casale Monferrato. In January 1860, he was appointed professor of physiology in Parma and in October of the same year, at the suggestion of Angelo Camillo De Meis, he was hired by the University of Naples, where in February 1861 he became director of the Institute of Physiology, a position he held until 1905. On 27 October 1877 he was elected foreign honorary member of the Royal Academy of Medicine of Belgium. He died in Turin on 18 January 1911 and was buried in the chapel of Abbiate Guazzone, near Como.

== Works ==
Giuseppe Albini was particularly interested in optics and chemistry and published articles on glandular secretions, embryology, and nerve physiology. He described small fibrous nodules on the margins of the mitral and tricuspid valves of the heart, residues of fetal tissue, which now bear his name: Albini's nodules.

== Works (selection) ==
- Ricerche sul veleno della salamandra maculata (1854)
- Lezioni di embriologia (1867)
- Trattato delle funzioni riproduttive e d'embriologia (1868)
- Sull'istruzione superiore e sull'ordinamento degli studj di medicina e di chirurgia, third edition (1882)

== Translations ==
- G. Hermann Meyer, Trattato di anatomia fisiologica umana (1867)
