= John Egerton (bishop) =

English bishop (1721–1787)

The Right Reverend John Egerton
- Bishop of Durham
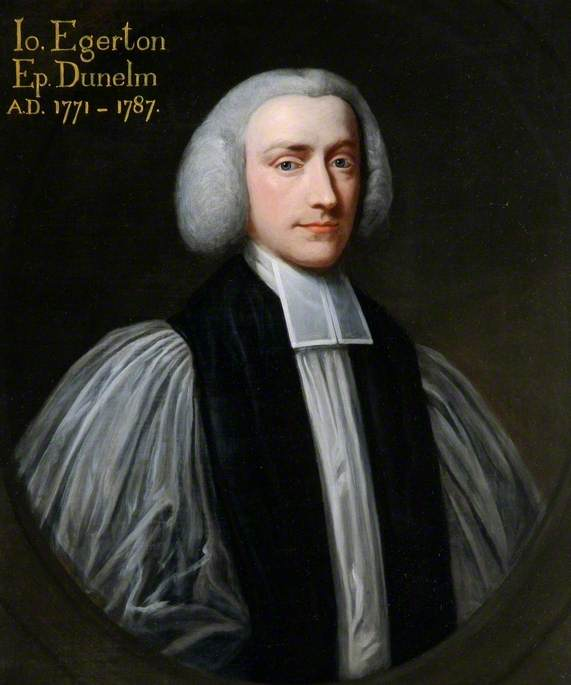
- Diocese: Diocese of Durham
- In office: 1771–1787 (death)
- Predecessor: Richard Trevor
- Successor: Thomas Thurlow
- Other posts: Dean of Hereford (24 July 1750–1756); Bishop of Bangor (1756–1768); Bishop of Lichfield and Coventry (12 October 1768 {translated}–1771)

Personal details
- Born: 30 November 1721 St James's, Middlesex, Great Britain
- Died: 18 June 1787 (aged 65) Mayfair, Middlesex, Great Britain
- Buried: St James's Church, Piccadilly
- Denomination: Anglican
- Residence: Grosvenor Square, Mayfair (at death)
- Parents: the Hon Henry Egerton (Bishop of Hereford) & Lady Elizabeth Bentinck
- Spouse: Lady Anne Grey (m. 1748; died 1780) Mary Boughton (m. 1782–1787)
- Children: Amelia Egerton, Lady Hume; John Egerton, 7th Earl of Bridgewater; Francis Egerton, 8th Earl of Bridgewater
- Profession: Church of England
- Education: Eton College; Oriel College, Oxford

Ordination history of John Egerton
History
Diaconal ordination
- Ordained by: Benjamin Hoadly, Bishop of Winchester
- Date: 21 December 1745
- Place: Grosvenor Chapel
Priestly ordination
- Ordained by: Hoadly
- Date: 22 December 1745
- Place: Grosvenor Chapel
Episcopal consecration
- Date: 4 July 1756

John Egerton (30 November 1721 –18 June 1787) was a Church of England clergyman from the Egerton family who eventually rose to be Bishop of Durham. As a young man he was associated with the beginning of tourism down the River Wye and later with the controversial appointment of an English monoglot to a Welsh-speaking parish in Anglesey.

== Life ==
John Egerton was the son of Henry Egerton, Bishop of Hereford, by Lady Elizabeth Ariana Bentinck, daughter of the Earl of Portland. After education at Eton College and at Oriel College, Oxford, he followed his father into the church and was ordained priest on 22 December 1745, and on the 23rd of the same month was collated by his father to the rectory of Ross-on-Wye. The rectory at Ross was a favorite residence of his for much of his life, to which he often invited friends and family members. Having had a boat specially made, he began taking his visitors on trips down the River Wye and such was their popularity that they became a regular feature. In consequence Egerton was later credited as "the father of the voyage down the Wye".

Egerton was later made Bishop of Bangor 1756–68, during which time he caused controversy by appointing Thomas Bowles, a priest who spoke no Welsh, to a parish where almost no one spoke English. The case did not come to court until after Egerton had become Bishop of Lichfield and Coventry (1768–71). Afterwards, having previously declined the primacy of Ireland, he shortly succeeded as Bishop of Durham and held that office until his death in 1787. At Durham he displayed a talent for conciliation in promoting peace and prosperity in the county, which had been divided by elections, and in the city, which had been torn by disputes. He was also a benefactor to the county by encouraging public works: He promoted the enclosure of Walling Fen; assisted materially in rebuilding a bridge over the Tyne between Newcastle and Gateshead; and in 1780 granted a new charter to the city of Durham. In addition, he made extensive improvements at the episcopal palaces and was a liberal supporter of many religious and educational institutions.

== Family ==
Egerton was the eldest son of Henry Egerton, himself a younger son of the 3rd Earl of Bridgewater. On 21 November 1748, he married his cousin, Lady Anne Grey, a daughter and coheiress of the 1st Duke of Kent. They had four children, one of whom died in infancy; the three others were:

- Amelia (1751–1809), married Sir Abraham Hume, 2nd Baronet.
- John William, later 7th Earl of Bridgewater (1753–1823)
- Francis Henry, later 8th Earl of Bridgewater (1756–1829)

Lady Anne died in 1780, and on 31 March 1782, Egerton married Mary Boughton, a sister of Sir Edward Boughton. Egerton died in 1787 and the title Earl of Bridgewater (a subsidiary title of his childless cousin, the 3rd Duke of Bridgewater) later passed to his eldest son in 1803.

== Sources ==
- Ellis, Peter Berresford (1994) [1993]. Celt and Saxon The Struggle for Britain AD 410–937. London: Constable & Co. pp. 241–242. ISBN 0-09-473260-4.

Church of England titles
Preceded by Edmund Castle	Dean of Hereford; 1750–1756	Succeeded by Francis Webber
Preceded by Zachary Pearce	Bishop of Bangor; 1756–1768	Succeeded by John Ewer
Preceded by Frederick Cornwallis	Bishop of Lichfield; 1768–1771	Succeeded by Brownlow North
Preceded by Richard Trevor	Bishop of Durham; 1771–1787	Succeeded by Thomas Thurlow
