= William d'Aubigny (Brito) =

English judge

William d'Aubigny I (d. after 1148), was an itinerant justice under King Henry I of England. He was commonly known by the appellation Brito.

== Life ==
William was a son of Main d'Aubigny, Breton lord of Saint-Aubin-d'Aubigné (now in Ille-et-Vilaine department) and Adelaïde de Bohun, daughter of Humphrey with the Beard. He fought at the Battle of Tinchebray (1106) and was high in Henry I's favour. He was allowed to marry Cecily, the elder daughter of Roger Bigod, sheriff of Norfolk. Through her, he acquired a part of the honour of Belvoir in Leicestershire – his castle became the centre of the family estates – after his mother-in-law, who had been the heir of Robert de Todeni, lord of Belvoir, died about 1130.

After the death of King Henry I in 1135, William was and remained a loyal supporter of King Stephen, who presumably confirmed him in succession of Belvoir which passed to his son William.

== Marriage and issue ==
William and Cecily had:

- William, who married Maud Fitz Robert, daughter of Robert Fitz Richard.
- Matildis married Gille Brigte, Earl of Strathearn.

== Sources ==
- Keats-Rohan, K. S. B. (2004). "Aubigné, William d'". Aubigné, William d' [William de Albini; known as William d'Aubigné Brito] (D. In or after 1148), baron. Oxford Dictionary of National Biography (online ed.). Oxford University Press. doi:10.1093/ref:odnb/281. (Subscription, Wikipedia Library access or UK public library membership required.)
- Neville, Cynthia J. (2002). "Native Lords and the Church in Thirteenth-Century Strathearn, Scotland". The Journal of Ecclesiastical History. 53 (3 (July)). Cambridge University Press.
