= William d'Aubigny =

William d'Aubigny may refer to:

- William d'Aubigny (died 1139), Pincerna Regis (Chief Butler of England)
- William d'Aubigny (Brito) (died c. 1148), itinerant justice under King Henry I of England
- William d'Aubigny (rebel) (died 1216), Magna Carta surety
- William d'Aubigny, 1st Earl of Arundel and Pincerna Regis (c. 1109–1176)
- William d'Aubigny, 2nd Earl of Arundel (c. 1150–1193)
- William d'Aubigny, 3rd Earl of Arundel (c. 1167–1221)
- William d'Aubigny, 4th Earl of Arundel (c. 1203 – before 7 August 1224)
