= William Egerton (politician, died 1783) =

British soldier and politician

William Egerton (c. 1730 – 26 May 1783), was a British soldier and politician who sat in the House of Commons from 1768 to 1780.

== Early life ==
Egerton was the son of Hon. Henry Egerton, Bishop of Hereford and his wife Lady Elizabeth Bentinck, daughter of William Bentinck, 1st Earl of Portland and educated at Eton College from 1742 to 1745.

He served in the army and was sub-brigadier 2nd Troop of Horse Guards in 1755. In 1761 he became yeoman and clerk of the Jewel Office a post he held to his death, and Gentleman usher to the Princess Dowager of Wales until her death in 1772. He became a captain in 1764.

== Political career ==
In the 1768 general election Egerton was returned as Member of Parliament for Brackley on the Bridgwater interest. He was re-elected in the 1774 general election and left Parliament in 1780. He is not known to have spoken in the House of Commons. While he was an MP, he continued to serve in the army and became major in 1771 and lieutenant-colonel in 1773. He was lieutenant governor of the Scilly Isles from 1776 until his retirement from the army in 1779.

== Later life ==
Egerton died on 26 May 1783. He had married Mary Kirke, daughter of Robert Kirke, on 15 August 1751 and had 2 sons and 3 daughters.

Parliament of Great Britain
Preceded by Viscount Hinchingbrooke; Robert Wood	Member of Parliament for Brackley; 1768–1780; With: Robert Wood 1768-1771; Timothy Caswall 1771-1780	Succeeded by John William Egerton; Timothy Caswall
