= Giles Daubeney, 1st Baron Daubeney =

Member of the Parliament of England

Giles Daubeney
- Baron Daubeney
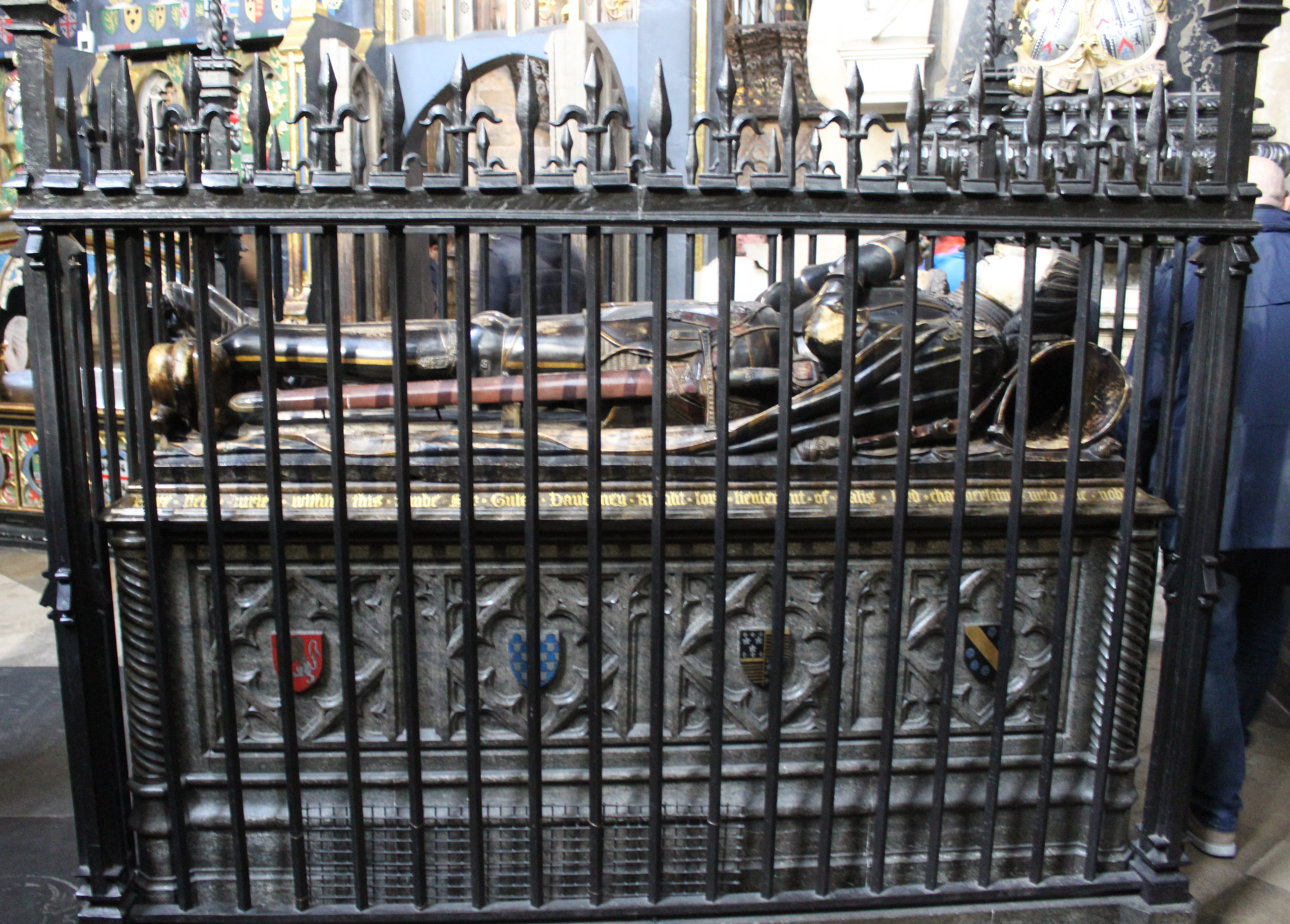
- Tomb effigy of Giles Daubeney in Westminster Abbey
- Born: 1 June 1451
- Died: 21 May 1508 (aged 57)
- Spouse: Elizabeth Arundell
- Issue: Henry Daubeney, 1st Earl of Bridgewater; Cecily Daubeney; Anne Daubeney
- Father: Sir William Daubeney
- Mother: Alice Stourton

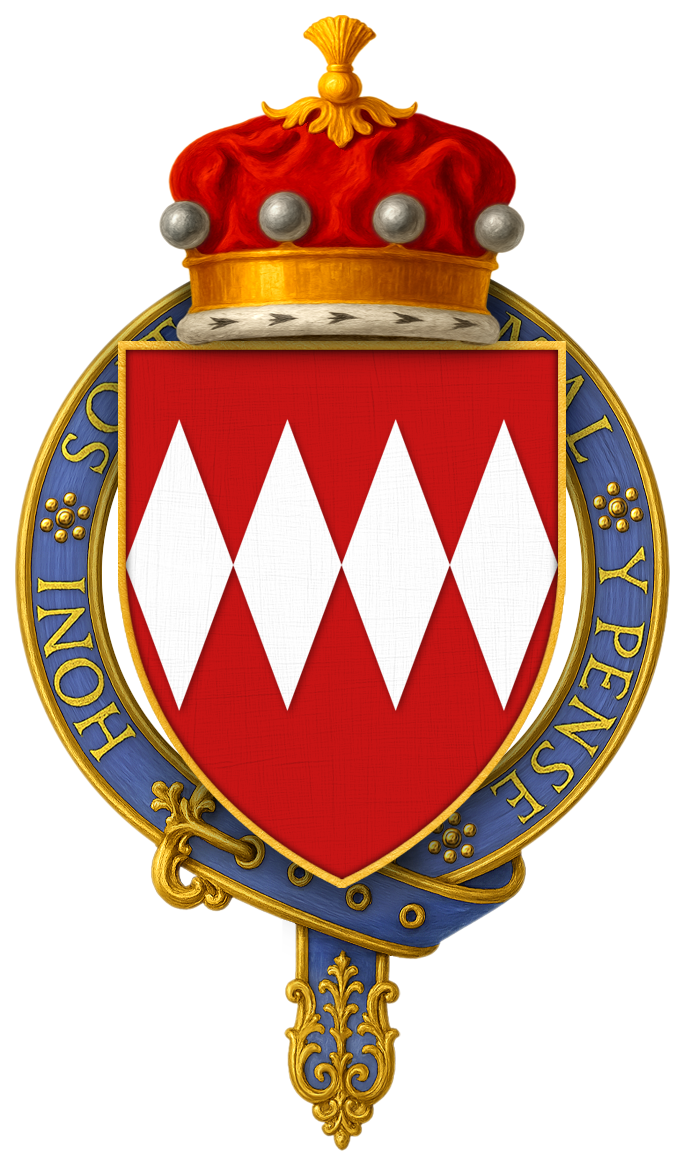
Arms of Sir Giles Daubeney, 1st Baron Daubeney, KG: Gules, four fusils conjoined in fess argent

Giles Daubeney, 1st Baron Daubeney (1 June 1451 – 21 May 1508) was an English soldier, diplomat, courtier and politician.

== Origins ==
Giles Daubeney was the eldest son and heir of Sir William Daubeney (1424-1460/1) of South Ingelby in Lincolnshire, and South Petherton and Barrington Court in Somerset, MP for Bedfordshire 1448/9, and Sheriff of Cornwall 1452/3. His mother, Alice Stourton, was the youngest of the three daughters and co-heiresses (by his 3rd wife Katherine Payne) of John Stourton (died 1438), builder of the Abbey Farm House, Preston Plucknett and owner of Brympton d'Evercy in Somerset, who was seven times MP for Somerset, in 1419, 1420, December 1421, 1423, 1426, 1429 and 1435. He was probably born at South Petherton in Somerset, where his father seems to have been resident. He had a brother James and sister Eleanor.

== Career ==
In 1475 he went over to France with Edward IV, from whom he obtained a licence before going to make a trust-deed of his lands in the counties of Somerset and Dorset. He was then designated esquire, and he went in command of four men-at-arms and fifty archers. Soon after he became one of the esquires for the king's body, and two years later he had a grant for life of the custody of the king's park at Petherton, near Bridgwater. Member of Parliament for Somerset in 1477–8, he was knighted before the end of King Edward's reign. He was also present at the coronation of Richard III on 6 July 1483.

He was consulted before anyone else by Reginald Bray about the projected invasion of Henry Tudor, Earl of Richmond, planned with Henry Stafford, 2nd Duke of Buckingham. On the failure of Buckingham's rebellion he with others fled to Richmond in Brittany, and he was consequently attainted in Richard's parliament. The custody of Petherton Park was granted to Richard FitzHugh, 6th Baron FitzHugh and Daubeney's lands in Somerset, Lincolnshire and Cornwall were confiscated.

== Under Henry VII ==
His fortunes were revived when Henry became King Henry VII in 1485. His attainder was reversed in Henry's first parliament, and he became a privy councillor. On 2 November he was appointed Master of the Mint, an office in which Bartholomew Reade of London, goldsmith, as the practical 'worker of monies,' was associated with him in survivorship. On 7 March 1486 he was appointed Lieutenant of Calais for a term of seven years, as reward for his services to the king; and on 12 March he was created Baron Daubeney with succession in tail male.

On 15 December 1486 he was named at the head of a major embassy to treat for a league with Maximilian, King of the Romans. About this time he was made a knight of the Garter. On 25 November 1487 he was present at the coronation of Elizabeth of York. On 20 December 1487 he was appointed one of the chamberlains of the receipt of the exchequer. He appears about this time to have gone on an embassy to France, and then was with the king at Greenwich on Twelfth Night, 1488. On 7 July 1488 of the same year he and Richard Foxe, bishop of Exeter, as commissioners for Henry VII, arranged with the Spanish ambassadors the first treaty for the marriage of Prince Arthur with Catherine of Aragon.

== Military operations ==
In 1489 he crossed to Calais, raised the siege of Diksmuide, and took Ostend from the French. In 1490 he was sent to the Duchess Anne in Brittany to arrange the terms of a treaty against France, and later in the year he was appointed commander of a body of troops sent to her assistance. In June 1492, Brittany having now lost her independence, he was again sent over to France, but this time as ambassador, with Foxe, then bishop of Bath and Wells, to negotiate a treaty of peace with Charles VIII. No settlement, however, was arrived at, and the king four months later invaded France and besieged Boulogne. The French then at once agreed to treat, and Daubeney was commissioned to arrange a treaty with the Sieur des Querdes, which was concluded at Étaples on 3 November.

In 1495, after the execution of Sir William Stanley, he was made Lord Chamberlain. On the meeting of parliament in October the same year he was elected one of the triers of petitions, as he also was in the parliaments of 1497 and 1504. In 1496 he, as the lieutenant of Calais, with Sir Richard Nanfan his deputy there, was commissioned to receive for the king payment of the twenty-five thousand francs due half-yearly from the French king under the Peace of Étaples.

In 1497 the king had prepared an army to invade Scotland to punish James IV for his support of Perkin Warbeck, and had given the command to Daubeney. He had hardly marched when he was recalled to put down the Cornish rebels, who came to Blackheath unmolested, and was criticised by the king. He set on the rebels at Deptford Strand, and they took him prisoner, but soon after let him go and were defeated (17 June). This ended the Cornish revolt. In September, Perkin having landed in Cornwall, there was a new disturbance in the west, to meet which Daubeney was sent with a troop of light horse, announcing that the king himself would shortly follow. The siege of Exeter was raised on his approach, and Perkin soon left.

== Later life ==
In 1500 Daubeney accompanied Henry VII to Calais, and was present at his meeting with the Archduke Philip. In 1501 he had charge of many of the arrangements for Catherine's reception in London, and in November he was a witness to Prince Arthur's assignment of her dower. On Thursday 18 May 1508, after riding with the king from Eltham to Greenwich, he was taken suddenly ill. He was ferried down the river to his house in London. On Saturday the 20th he received the sacrament. He died about ten o'clock in the evening of the 21st, aged 57, and his obit, according to old ecclesiastical custom, was kept on the 22nd. On the afternoon of the 26th his body was conveyed to Westminster by the river, and almost all the nobility of the kingdom witnessed his funeral rites.

He had in his will appointed Westminster Abbey as his place of sepulture, and his body rests now under a monument in St Paul's chapel (Westminster Abbey) with alabaster effigies of himself and his wife by his side. A Latin epitaph was written for him by Bernard André, and may have been inscribed on his tomb.

== Family ==
His wife Elizabeth, was a daughter of Sir John Arundell of Lanherne in Cornwall. She survived him some years, and obtained from Henry VIII the wardship of his son and heir Henry, 2nd Lord Daubeney, later 1st Earl of Bridgewater. Their first daughter, Cecily Daubeney, married John Bourchier, 1st Earl of Bath, and had descendants. Their second daughter, Anne, married Alexander Buller.

== Notes ==
Political offices
| Preceded by Robert Palmer | High Sheriff of Somerset; 1474–1475 | Succeeded by William Collingbourne |
| Preceded by John Fortescue | Undersheriff of Cornwall for John Fortescue; 1476–1477 | Succeeded by William Carnesew |
| Preceded by Edward Hardgill | High Sheriff of Somerset; 1480–1481 | Succeeded by Richard Morton |
| Preceded by Sir Robert Willoughby | High Sheriff of Devon; 1481–1482 | Succeeded by Sir William Courtenay |
| Preceded by Sir Richard Guildford | Chamberlain of the Exchequer; 1487–1508 | Succeeded by The Earl of Shrewsbury |
| Preceded by Sir William Stanley | Lord Chamberlain; 1494–1508 | Succeeded by The Lord Herbert |
Peerage of England
| New creation | Baron Daubeney; 1486–1508 | Succeeded by Henry Daubeney |
