= Carlo Albini =

Italian footballer (1914–1976)

Personal information
- Date of birth: 22 March 1914
- Place of birth: Brescia, Italy
- Date of death: 18 November 1976 (aged 62)
- Place of death: Rho, Lombardy, Italy
- Position: Defender

Senior career*
Years	Team	Apps	(Gls)
1935–1949	Brescia	327	(20)
- * Club domestic league appearances and goals

Carlo Albini (22 March 1914 – 18 November 1976) was an Italian footballer who played as a defender. He spent his entire career with Brescia.
