= Timothy Caswall =

Timothy Caswall (c. 1733–1802) was a British Army officer and politician who sat in the House of Commons between 1761 and 1789.

== Early life ==
Caswall was the son of George Caswall of London and Weybridge, son of Sir George Caswall an MP and banker. He joined the army in the 2nd Foot Guards (Coldstreams) and was Ensign in 1750 and lieutenant and captain in 1756. In 1758 at the Battle of St. Cast, he was wounded with both legs broken by a cannonball. After being taken prisoner, he was held at St Malo languishing in great pain for four months. He was then brought back to England at great expense, where his wound was healed.

== Political career ==
Caswall applied for promotion in the army or a government post but obtained neither. In the 1761 general election he was returned unopposed as Member of Parliament for Hertford on the interest of Nathaniel Brassey, his uncle. He continued to seek a salaried government post, but having sold his commission in the army in 1762, he disqualified himself in the King’s opinion. He married Mary Constantia Rolt on 28 January 1762, daughter and heir of Thomas Rolt of Sacombe Park. Mary's brother Captain Thomas Rolt (1st Foot Guards) the only son of Thomas Rolt, died at the battle at the Battle of St. Cast.

In 1768 Caswall was made deputy paymaster of the forces and did not stand at the general election of 1768. In 1771 he was elected MP for Brackley in the interest of the Duke of Bridgwater. He was returned for Brackley again in 1774, 1780 and 1784. In September 1789 he vacated his seat in Parliament when he was appointed as a Commissioner of Excise.

== Later life ==
Caswall died on 24 August 1802.

Parliament of Great Britain
Preceded by Nathaniel Brassey; Viscount Fordwich	Member of Parliament for Hertford; 1761–1768; With: John Calvert	Succeeded by John Calvert; William Cowper
Preceded by William Egerton; Robert Wood	Member of Parliament for Brackley; 1771–1789; With: William Egerton 1771-1780; John William Egerton 1780-1789	Succeeded by John William Egerton; Samuel Haynes
