= Giuseppe Albini (philologist) =

Italian classical philologist and politician (1863–1933)

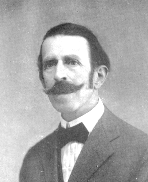
- Born: January 22, 1863; Bologna, Kingdom of Italy
- Died: December 7, 1933 (aged 70); Bologna, Kingdom of Italy
- Occupations: Philologist, Latinist, politician

Giuseppe Albini (January 22, 1863 – December 7, 1933) was an Italian philologist, Latinist and politician.

== Biography ==
Giuseppe Albini was born on January 22, 1863, in Bologna. As a student of Giosuè Carducci, he taught Latin grammar and Greek at a young age and succeeded Giovanni Battista Gandino in the chair of Latin philology, which he held until his death. At the Bolognese university, he served as dean of the Faculty of Letters and Philosophy (1912–1918) and Rector of the university (1927–1930).

He wrote poetry in Italian and in Latin, edited editions of Persius, Dante, Giovanni del Virgilio; translated the complete works of Virgil including the Georgics in hendecasyllabic verse. He also wrote his own essays.

He was a member of the Deputation of homeland history for Romagna, corresponding member of the Academy of Sciences, Letters and Arts of Padua and of the Accademia Nazionale Virgiliana di Scienze Lettere ed Arti of Mantua.

Albini participated in the Certamen poeticum Hoeufftianum in Amsterdam, winning the gold medal in 1919 with the poem Vercingetorix and the great praise five times with Sponsa nautae (1882), Ad Vergilium (1885), Ad Bononiam (1888), Ravenna (1911) and Aeriae voces (1912).

Giuseppe Albini was a member of the Fascist Party since 1925. He was a municipal councilor and from 1924, a senator of the Kingdom.

He died on December 7, 1933, in Bologna. He is buried at the Certosa di Bologna.

== Works ==
- Il Modesti e la Veneziade, Imola, Tipografia Galeati, 1886.
- Poesie varie, Bologna, Zanichelli, 1897.
- Il libro sesto dell'Odissea, Torino, Loescher, 1889.
- Liriche, Torino, Loescher, 1894.
- A Giosue Carducci, Bologna, Zanichelli, 1896.
- Epigrammi romani, Bologna, Zanichelli, 1896.
- Il canto, Bologna, Zanichelli, 1897.
- Le Bucoliche di Virgilio, Bologna, Zanichelli, 1898.
- Poesie, Bologna, Zanichelli, 1901.
- Il canto quarto del Paradiso, Firenze, Sansoni, 1903.
- Le egloghe (di Dante), Firenze, Sansoni, 1905.
- Il Giorno di Parini, Firenze, Sansoni, 1907.
- I Carracci, Bologna, Zanichelli, 1909.
- Ottobre italico, Bologna, Zanichelli, 1909.
- Carmina, Tipografia Gallatania, 1909.
- Il Leopardi cento anni fa, Bologna, Zanichelli, 1917.
- Ascensioni eroiche, Bologna, Zanichelli, 1921.
- L'Eneide di Virgilio, Bologna, Zanichelli, 1925.
- Le Georgiche, Roma, Sapientia, 1931.
- Virgilio, l'anima e l'arte, Milano, Vita e pensiero, 1931.
- Ecloga responsiva (di Giovanni del Virgilio), Firenze, Olschki, 1933.

== Honors ==
- Order of the Crown of Italy
- Order of Saints Maurice and Lazarus

== Bibliography ==
- Concetto Marchesi, Giuseppe Albini, in «Rivista mensile del Comune di Bologna», December 1933, p. 49.
- Alfredo Galletti, La poesia e il concetto dell'arte negli scritti di Giuseppe Albini, in «Rivista mensile del Comune di Bologna», January 1934, p. 18.
- Gino Funaioli, Commemoration, in «Annuario della Regia Università di Bologna», 1935, pp. 55–79.
- Lorenzo Bianchi, Intorno all'opera di Giuseppe Albini, in «Rendiconti delle sessioni della Regia Accademia delle scienze dell'Istituto di Bologna», 3, IX, 1936, pp. 16–53.
- Emilio Lovarini, Commemoration di Giuseppe Albini, in «Annuario della Regia Università di Bologna», 1935, pp. 81–109.
- Giovan Battista Pighi, in «Aevum», XIII, 1939.
- Enrico Maria Fusco, Giuseppe Albini, in Scrittori e idee, Turin, S. E. I., 1956, p. 12.
- Nicola Terzaghi (1960). Dizionario Biografico degli Italiani (in Italian). Vol. 2: Albicante–Ammannati. Rome: Istituto dell'Enciclopedia Italiana. OCLC 883370.
- Luciana Martinelli, Albini, Giuseppe, in Enciclopedia dantesca, Rome, Treccani, 1970, URL consulted on May 16, 2019.
- Gino Funaioli, Giuseppe Albini, in Letteratura italiana – I Critici, volume secondo, Milan, Marzorati, 1970, pp. 1411–1418.
