= Thomas Egerton, 1st Viscount Brackley =

English politician (1540–1617)

The Right Honourable The Viscount Brackley KG
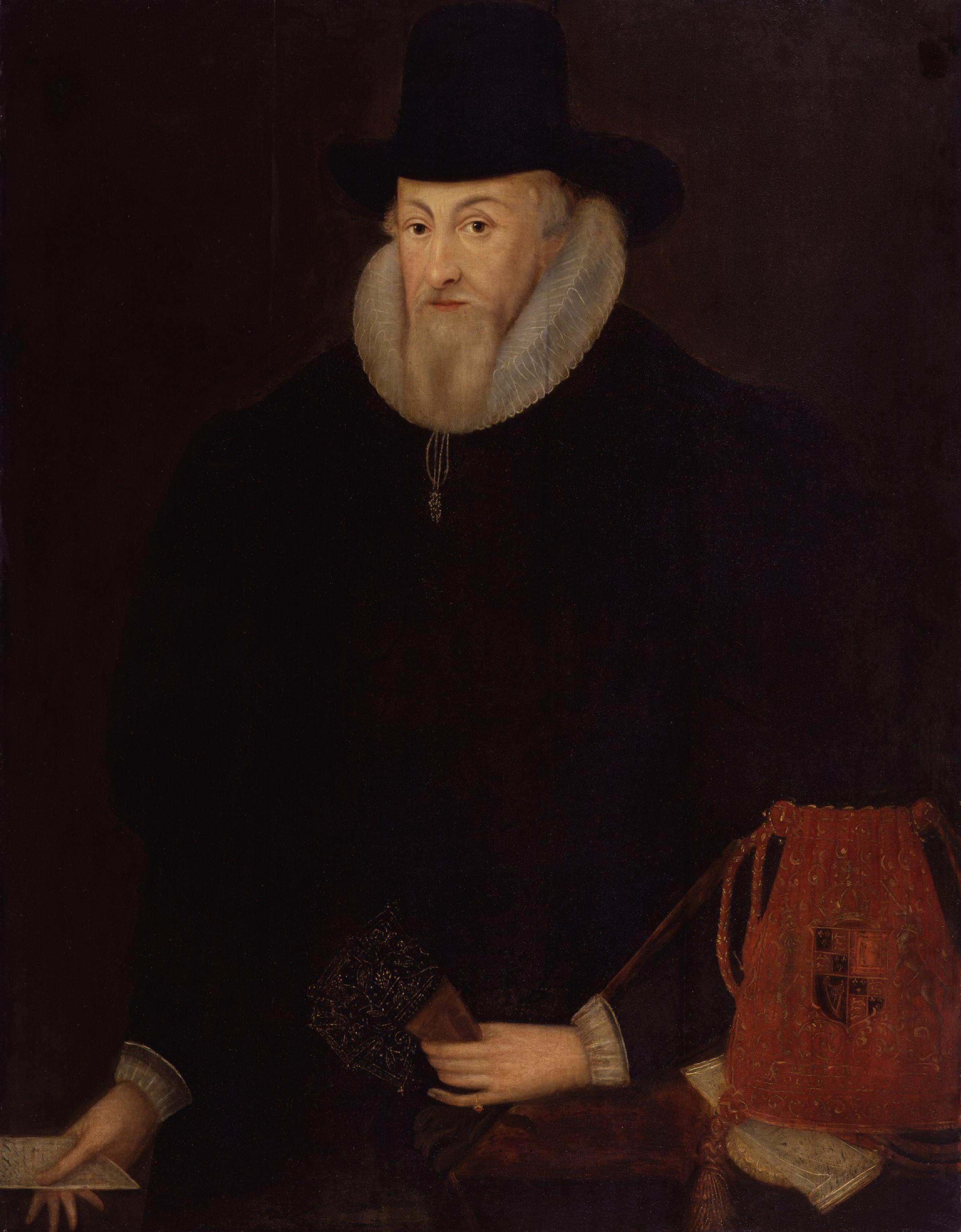

Lord High Treasurer
- In office 1613–1614
- Preceded by: The Earl of Northampton
- Succeeded by: The Earl of Suffolk

Lord High Chancellor of England
- In office 6 May 1596 – 5 March 1617
- Preceded by: Sir John Puckering
- Succeeded by: Sir Francis Bacon

Lord Keeper of the Great Seal
- In office 6 May 1596 – 5 March 1617
- Preceded by: Sir John Puckering
- Succeeded by: Sir Francis Bacon
Additional offices
Master of the Rolls
In office 10 April 1594 – 18 May 1603
Preceded by	Sir Gilbert Gerard
Succeeded by	Edward Bruce, 1st Lord Kinloss
Attorney General for England and Wales
In office 2 June 1592 – 10 April 1594
Preceded by	Sir John Popham
Succeeded by	Sir Edward Coke
Solicitor General for England and Wales
Preceded by	Sir John Popham
Succeeded by	Sir Edward Coke

Personal details
- Born: (c.1540) Dodleston, Cheshire, England
- Died: 15 March 1617
- Spouse: Elizabeth Ravenscroft
- Children: Sir Thomas Egerton; John Egerton, 1st Earl of Bridgwater; Mary Egerton
- Parent(s): Sir Richard Egerton; Alice Sparks

Arms of Egerton: Argent, a lion rampant gules between three pheons sable

Thomas Egerton, 1st Viscount Brackley, PC (c. 1540 – 15 March 1617), known as Lord Ellesmere from 1603 to 1616, was an English nobleman, judge and statesman from the Egerton family, also recorded Edgerton and Egert, who served as Lord Keeper and Lord Chancellor for twenty-one years.

== Early life, education and legal career ==
Thomas Egerton was born in 1540 in the parish of Dodleston, Cheshire, England. He was the illegitimate son of Sir Richard Egerton and an unmarried woman named Alice Sparks from Bickerton. He was acknowledged by his father's family, who paid for his education, in some documents he is recorded under the shortened form Egert, known as a variation for collateral members. He studied Liberal Arts at Brasenose College, Oxford, and received a bachelor's degree in 1559. He then studied law at Lincoln's Inn and was called as a barrister by 1572. He was a Roman Catholic, until a point in 1570 when his non-conformity with the Church of England became an issue with his Inn passing on a complaint from the Privy Council.

Egerton built a respectable legal practice pleading cases in the Courts of Queen's Bench, Chancery and Exchequer. After Queen Elizabeth I saw him plead a case against the Crown he was appointed Queen's Counsel. In 1579 he was elected Master of the Bench of Lincoln's Inn. On 28 June 1581 he was appointed Solicitor General.

He married Elizabeth Ravenscroft, daughter of Thomas Ravenscroft of Bretton, Flint, in 1576 and by her had issue:

- Thomas (died 1599), who married Elizabeth Venables; their youngest daughter, Mary, was married to Thomas Leigh, 1st Baron Leigh
- John (his heir),
- Mary, who married Sir Francis Leigh.

== Solicitor General, Attorney General and Master of the Rolls ==
As Solicitor General, Egerton became a frequent legal advocate for the crown, often arguing cases instead of the Attorney General. Briefly, he was MP for Cheshire, 1584–87. He was one of the prosecutors at the trial of Mary, Queen of Scots, in 1586 at Sheffield. He was also the prosecutor in the trial of Philip Howard, Earl of Arundel, for high treason. He was made Attorney General on 2 June 1592, he was knighted the next year. He was made Master of the Rolls on 10 April 1594 where he excelled as an equity judge and became a patron of the young Francis Bacon. After the death of the Lord Keeper Puckering he was appointed Lord Keeper of the Great Seal and sworn a Privy Councillor on 6 May 1596, remaining Master of the Rolls and thus the sole judge in the Court of Chancery.

During this time his first wife died, and he married Elizabeth Wolley, the widow of Sir John Wolley, and daughter of Sir William More of Loseley, Surrey. He bought Tatton Park, in 1598. It would stay in the family for more than three centuries. Also at this time (1597 or 1598) he hired John Donne as secretary. This arrangement ended in some embarrassment since Donne secretly married Ann More, Elizabeth's niece, in 1601.

Elizabeth died around the beginning of 1600, and in October 1600 Egerton married Alice Spencer, whose first husband had been Ferdinando Stanley, 5th Earl of Derby. She survived him by two decades, and was an important patron of the arts, usually known as the Dowager Countess of Derby.

At Ashridge, Hertfordshire, Thomas Egerton purchased Ashridge House, one of the largest country houses in England, from Queen Elizabeth I, who had inherited it from her father who had appropriated it after the dissolution of the monasteries in 1539. Ashridge House served the Egerton family as a residence until the 19th century. The Egertons later had a family chapel (the Bridgewater Chapel) with a burial vault in Little Gaddesden Church, where many monuments commemorate the Dukes and Earls of Bridgewater and their families.

== Lord Keeper and Lord Chancellor ==
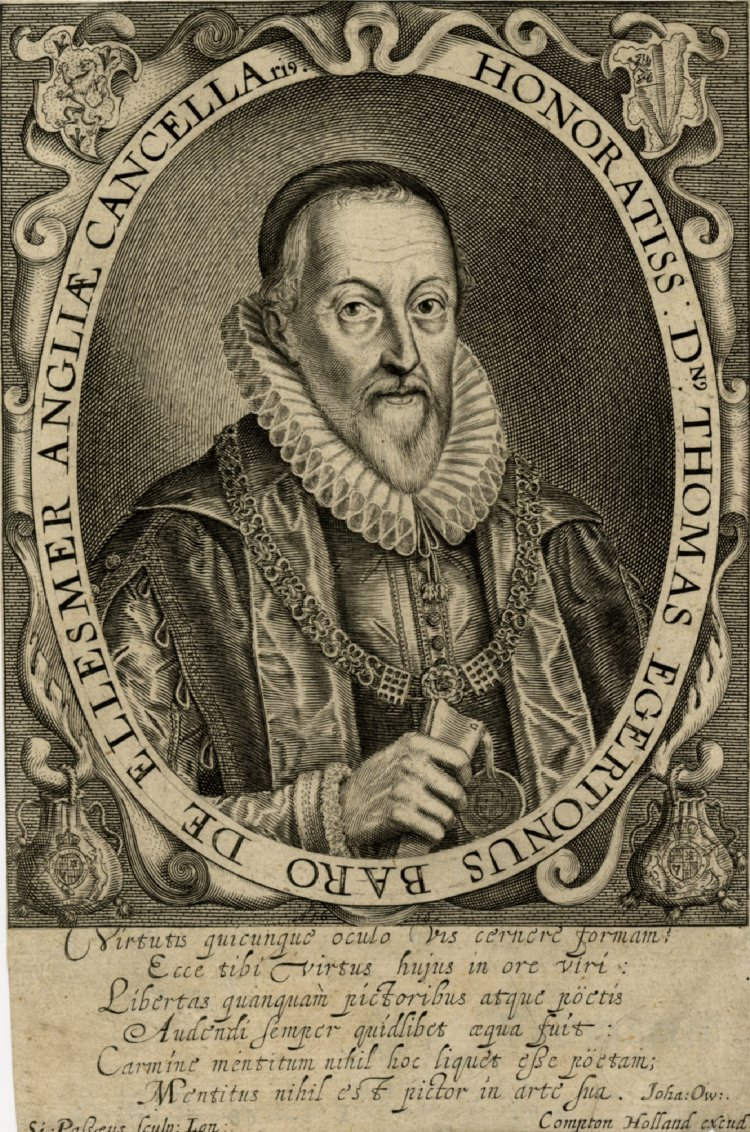
Engraved portrait of Thomas Egerton by Simon de Passe

As Lord Keeper, Egerton's judgements were admired, but Common-law judges often resented him for reversing their decisions. He also attempted to expand the jurisdiction of the Court of Chancery to include the imposition of fines to enforce his injunctions. In the 9th Parliament of the reign of Elizabeth (1597–1598), he supported legal reform and the royal power to create monopolies.

In November 1599 Egerton, seeking the queen's favour, asked a courtier Michael Stanhope to give her a gift of pearls. She told Stanhope to return them to Egerton, who felt that Stanhope had let him down.

Sir Thomas was a friend of Robert Devereux, 2nd Earl of Essex, and often interceded to mend relations between Essex and the Queen. After Essex returned from Ireland in disgrace he was placed in the Lord Keeper's custody, under house arrest at York House, Strand. He was one of the judges at Essex's first trial, and tried to persuade him to apologise and beg mercy from the Queen. He pronounced the sentence against Essex, although it was dictated by the Queen. During Essex's rebellion, he was sent to persuade Essex to surrender, but was instead held hostage for several hours until one of Essex's supporters freed him to gain pardon from the Queen.

Egerton bought a house at Harefield and in August 1602 staged an elaborate entertainment for the queen. James VI of Scotland succeeded to the throne of England as James I at the Union of the Crowns. Egerton and Lord Buckhurst travelled to Northamptonshire in June 1603 to greet Anne of Denmark and her children as they journeyed towards Windsor Castle.

Egerton remained in office, and King James made him Lord Chancellor and 1st Baron Ellesmere on 19 July 1603. He was removed from the office of Master of the Rolls on 18 May 1603, but as the office was granted to an absentee Scottish Lord he continued to perform its duties. Shortly afterwards he presided over the trial of Barons Cobham and Grey de Wilton for high treason for their part in the Main Plot.

In the first Parliament of James I Lord Ellesmere attempted to exercise the right of the Lord Chancellor to disqualify members from sitting in the House of Commons, but in the end, yielded that right to the House itself. He attempted to persuade Parliament to support the King's plans for a union of England and Scotland, but was unsuccessful. In 1606 he ruled that Scottish subjects born after the succession of James I were naturalised English subjects.

Lord Ellesmere supported the Royal prerogative, but was concerned to define it, and ensure it was never confused with the ordinary legal processes. Towards the end of his life, he stood out against the arguments made by Sir Edward Coke, the Lord Chief Justice, and ultimately aided the King in securing his dismissal. He attempted to resign several times after this, as he became increasingly old and infirm, and the King finally accepted his resignation on 5 March 1617, after his creation as Viscount Brackley on 7 November 1616. He was promised the earldom of Bridgewater, but showed little interest, and died twelve days after leaving office on 15 March 1617. He is buried in Dodleston, Cheshire.

=== Family ===
by his first wife, Elizabeth

- Sir Thomas Egerton (1574–1599)
- John Egerton, 1st Earl of Bridgwater (1579–1649)
- Mary Egerton, married Sir Francis Leigh, of King's Newnham, Warwickshire

== Notes ==
=== Bibliography ===
- Campbell, John (1868). Lives of the Lord Chancellors and Keepers of the Great Seal of England, From the Earliest Times Till the Reign of King George IV (Fifth ed.). London: John Murray.
- Knafla, Louis A. (1977). Law and Politics in Jacobean England. The Tracts of Lord Chancellor Ellesmere.
- Mosley, Charles (2003). Burke's Peerage and Baronetage (106th ed.). pp. 1233–5.
- Gibbs, Vicary (1949). The Complete Peerage of Great Britain and Ireland. London: St Catherine's Press.

Political offices
Preceded by Sir Gilbert Gerard	Master of the Rolls; 1594–1603	Succeeded by The Lord Kinloss
Preceded by Sir John Puckering	Lord Chancellor and Lord Keeper of the Great Seal; 1596–1617	Succeeded by Sir Francis Bacon
Preceded by The Earl of Northampton	First Lord of the Treasury; 1613–1614	Succeeded by The Earl of Suffolk as Lord High Treasurer
Parliament of England
Preceded by George Calveley; William Booth	Member of Parliament for Cheshire; 1584–1587; With: Hugh Cholmondeley 1584–1586; John Savage 1586–1587	Succeeded by John Savage; Sir George Beeston
Legal offices
Preceded by Sir John Popham	Solicitor General for England and Wales; 1581–1592	Succeeded by Sir Edward Coke
Preceded by Sir John Popham	Attorney General for England and Wales; 1592–1594	Succeeded by Sir Edward Coke
Academic offices
Preceded by Richard Bancroft	Chancellor of the University of Oxford; 1610–1616	Succeeded by The Earl of Pembroke
Honorary titles
Preceded by The Earl of Leicester	Custos Rotulorum of Denbighshire bef. 1594–1596	Succeeded by Roger Puleston
Preceded by The Earl of Leicester	Custos Rotulorum of Flintshire bef. 1594–1596	Succeeded by Thomas Ravenscroft
Unknown	Lord Lieutenant of Buckinghamshire; 1607–1616	Succeeded by The Duke of Buckingham
Peerage of England
New creation	Viscount Brackley; 1616–1617	Succeeded by John Egerton
New creation	Baron Ellesmere; 1603–1617	Succeeded by John Egerton
