= Henry Egerton =

English bishop (1689–1746)

Arms of Egerton: Argent, a lion rampant gules between three pheons sable

Henry Egerton (10 February 1689 – 1 April 1746) was a British clergyman from the Egerton family. He was Bishop of Hereford between 1723 and his death in 1746.

== Life ==
Egerton was a younger son of John Egerton, 3rd Earl of Bridgewater, by his second wife Lady Jane, daughter of Charles Paulet, 1st Duke of Bolton. Scroop Egerton, 1st Duke of Bridgewater, was his elder brother. He was educated at Eton College (1706 – 1707) and New College, Oxford, matriculating in 1707. He studied civil law at Oxford, graduating BCL in 1712 and DCL in 1717.

He was ordained deacon in 1712 in Christ Church, Oxford and afterwards priested and presented to two family benefices in the Yorkshire villages of Dunnington and Settrington. In 1716 he became canon of Christ Church. He exchanged his Yorkshire parishes for two other family livings in north Shropshire, Whitchurch and Myddle. He also became deputy to the clerk of the closet in 1719, giving it up in 1723 when, after having been recommended for the vacant post of Bishop of Hereford by Edmund Gibson, Bishop of London and Robert Walpole's chief ecclesiastical adviser, he was consecrated at Lambeth Palace on 2 February 1724. He was allowed to retain the Shropshire livings in commendam with the bishopric until his death. He was given the sinecure of Clerk of the Closet in 1737, a post he held until his death in 1746.

== Family ==
Egerton married on 18 December 1720 Lady Elizabeth Adriana, daughter of William Bentinck, 1st Earl of Portland. Their son the Right Reverend John Egerton became Bishop of Durham and was the father of the seventh and eighth Earls of Bridgewater. Egerton died in April 1746 aged 57 and was buried in the chancel at St James, Westminster, on 5 April 1746. Lady Elizabeth survived him by almost twenty years and died in 1765.

Henry Egerton and Elizabeth Adriana Bentinck had six children:

- John Egerton, Bishop of Durham
- William Egerton MP for Brackley
- Henry Egerton
- Lt. Col. Charles Egerton
- Francis Egerton (born 20 December 1737)
- Anne Egerton

Church of England titles
Preceded by Benjamin Hoadly	Bishop of Hereford; 1723–1746	Succeeded by Lord James Beauclerk
