= Saint-Aubin-d'Aubigné =

Saint-Aubin-d'Aubigné ptî' Saint Aubin (Gallo) Sant-Albin-Elvinieg (Breton)
- Commune
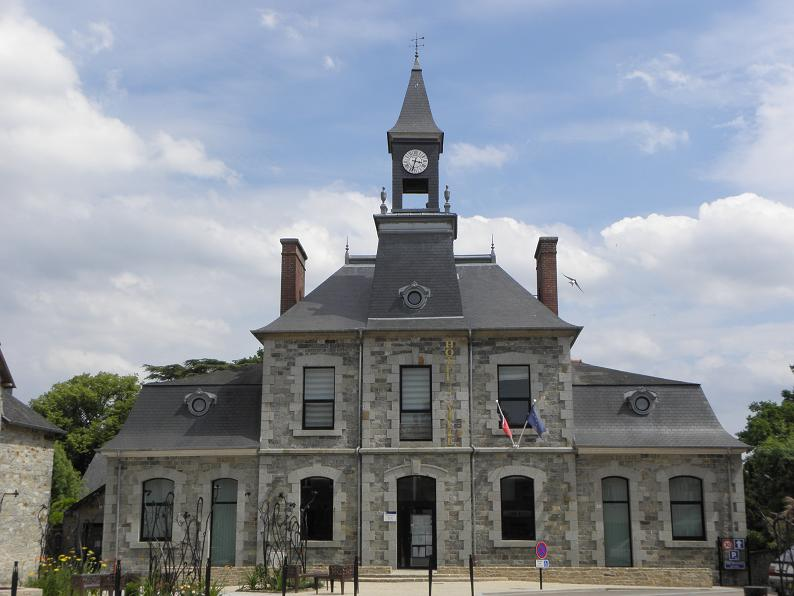
- The town hall of Saint-Aubin-d'Aubigné

- Coat of arms
- Location of Saint-Aubin-d'Aubigné
- Location within France Location within Brittany
- Coordinates: 48°15′47″N 1°36′17″W
- Country: France
- Region: Brittany
- Department: Ille-et-Vilaine
- Arrondissement: Rennes
- Canton: Val-Couesnon
- Intercommunality: Val d'Ille-Aubigné

Government
  - Mayor (2020–2026): Jacques Richard
- Area^{1}: 23.52 km^{2} (9.08 sq mi)
- Highest elevation: 111 m (364 ft)
- Lowest elevation: 42 m (138 ft)
- Population (2023): 4,304
  - Density: 183.0/km^{2} (474.0/sq mi)
- Time zone: UTC+01:00 (CET)
  - Summer (DST): UTC+02:00 (CEST)
- INSEE/Postal code: 35251 /35250
- ^{1} French Land Register data, which excludes lakes, ponds, glaciers > 1 km^{2} (0.386 sq mi or 247 acres) and river estuaries.

Saint-Aubin-d'Aubigné (French pronunciation: [sɛ̃.t‿obɛ̃ dobiɲe], literally Saint-Aubin of Aubigné; Gallo: ptî' Saint Aubin, Breton: Sant-Albin-Elvinieg) is a commune in the Ille-et-Vilaine department in Brittany in northwestern France.

== Population ==
Inhabitants of Saint-Aubin-d'Aubigné are called Saint-Aubinois in French.

Historical population
Year	Pop.	±% p.a.
1968	1,544	—
1975	1,680	+1.21%
1982	2,133	+3.47%
1990	2,170	+0.22%
1999	2,440	+1.31%
2007	3,033	+2.76%
2012	3,373	+2.15%
2017	3,796	+2.39%
2023	4,304	+2.12%
Source: INSEE

== See also ==
- Communes of the Ille-et-Vilaine department
