= List of songs recorded by Westlife =

Songs by Irish boy band

Westlife have recorded and released 151 original songs which were composed by either the band or external songwriters.

== Originals ==
| | Year | Song | Album/Single | Writers |
|---|---|---|---|---|
| 1 | 1999 | Swear It Again | Westlife | Steve Mac, Wayne Hector |
| 2 | 1999 | Until the End of Time | Swear It Again | Anders Bagge, Arnthor Birgisson, Christian Karlsson |
| 3 | 1999 | Everybody Knows | Swear It Again | Mac, Hector |
| 4 | 1999 | Let's Make Tonight Special | Swear It Again | Anders Bagge, Laila Bagge, H. Sommerdah, S. Diamond |
| 5 | 1999 | Don't Calm the Storm | Swear It Again | Birgisson, Patrick Tucker |
| 6 | 1999 | If I Let You Go | Westlife | David Kreuger, Jorgen Elofsson, Per Magnusson |
| 7 | 1999 | Flying Without Wings | Westlife | Mac, Hector |
| 8 | 1999 | Fool Again | Westlife | Kreuger, Elofsson, Magnusson |
| 9 | 1999 | No No | Westlife | Andreas Carlsson, Rami Yacoub |
| 10 | 1999 | I Don't Wanna Fight | Westlife | Mac, Hector |
| 11 | 1999 | Change the World | Westlife (not on US Version) | Karl Twigg, Lance Ellington, Mark Topham |
| 12 | 1999 | Moments | Westlife (not on US Version) | Mac, Hector |
| 13 | 1999 | I Need You | Westlife | Carlsson, Max Martin, Yacoub |
| 14 | 1999 | Miss You | Westlife | Jake, Yacoub |
| 15 | 1999 | Open Your Heart | Westlife | Carlsson, Jake |
| 16 | 1999 | Try Again | Westlife (not on US Version) | Kreuger, Elofsson, Magnusson |
| 17 | 1999 | What I Want Is What I've Got | Westlife (not on US Version) | Alexandra, Yacoub |
| 18 | 1999 | We Are One | Westlife | Alexandre Desplat, Mac, Hector |
| 19 | 1999 | Can't Lose What You Never Had | Westlife | David Frank, Steve Kipler |
| 20 | 1999 | Story Of Love | Westlife (Japan Version) | Anders Bagge, Birgisson, Tucker, Shepherd Solomon |
| 21 | 1999 | That's What It's All About | Flying Without Wings | Mac, Hector |
| 22 | 1999 | On The Wings Of Love | I Have a Dream/Seasons in the Sun | Twigg, Topham |
| 23 | 2000 | Tunnel of Love | Fool Again | Kreuger, Elofsson, Magnusson |
| 24 | 2000 | My Private Movie | Westlife (US Version) | David Kopatz, Jack Kugell |
| 25 | 2000 | My Love | Coast to Coast | Kreuger, Elofsson, Pelle Nylen, Magnusson |
| 26 | 2000 | What Makes a Man | Coast to Coast | Mac, Hector |
| 27 | 2000 | I Lay My Love on You | Coast to Coast | Kreuger, Elofsson, Magnusson |
| 28 | 2000 | When You're Looking Like That | Coast to Coast | Carlsson, Martin, Yacoub |
| 29 | 2000 | Close | Coast to Coast | Chris Farren, Mac, Hector |
| 30 | 2000 | Somebody Needs You | Coast to Coast | Carlsson, Jake, Elofsson |
| 31 | 2000 | Angel's Wings | Coast to Coast | J. McCarthy, Mac, Hector |
| 32 | 2000 | Soledad | Coast to Coast | Carlsson, K. C. Porter, Yacoub |
| 33 | 2000 | Puzzle of My Heart | Coast to Coast | Fromm, Elofsson |
| 34 | 2000 | Dreams Come True | Coast to Coast | Kreuger, Elofsson, Magnusson |
| 35 | 2000 | Close Your Eyes | Coast to Coast | Mac, Hector |
| 36 | 2000 | You Make Me Feel | Coast to Coast | Martin, Jarl, Patric Jonsson |
| 37 | 2000 | Loneliness Knows Me By Name | Coast to Coast | Alexandra |
| 38 | 2000 | Fragile Heart | Coast to Coast | Brian McFadden, Kian Egan, Shane Filan |
| 39 | 2000 | Every Little Thing You Do | Coast to Coast | Mac, Hector |
| 40 | 2000 | Don't Get Me Wrong | Coast to Coast (UK Version) | Anders Von Hofsten |
| 41 | 2000 | Nothing Is Impossible | Coast to Coast | McFadden, Nicky Byrne, Egan |
| 42 | 2001 | Queen of My Heart | World of Our Own | John McLaughlin, Mac, Steve Robson, Hector |
| 43 | 2001 | Reason For Living | World of Our Own (Deluxe Edition) | Byrne, Egan, Mark Feehily, Filan, McFadden |
| 44 | 2001 | Bop Bop Baby | World of Our Own | Chris O'Brien, Graham Murphy, Filan, McFadden |
| 45 | 2001 | I Cry | World of Our Own | Kreuger, Elofsson, Magnusson |
| 46 | 2001 | Why Do I Love You | World of Our Own | Elofsson, Magnusson, Kreuger |
| 47 | 2001 | I Wanna Grow Old With You | World of Our Own | Egan, Filan, McFadden |
| 48 | 2001 | Evergreen | World of Our Own | Kreuger, Elofsson, Magnusson |
| 49 | 2001 | World of Our Own | World of Our Own | Mac, Hector |
| 50 | 2001 | To Be Loved | World of Our Own | Mac, Hector |
| 51 | 2001 | Drive (For All Time) | World of Our Own | Mac, Hector |
| 52 | 2001 | If Your Heart's Not In It | World of Our Own | Kipner, Andrew Frampton |
| 53 | 2001 | When You Come Around | World of Our Own | Ash Howes, Julian Gallagher, Martin Harrington, Richard Stannard, Byrne, Egan |
| 54 | 2001 | Don't Say It's Too Late | World of Our Own | Andreas "Quiz" Romdhane, Josef Larossi |
| 55 | 2001 | Don't Let Me Go | World of Our Own | Byrne, Egan, Howes, Gallagher, Harrington, Stannard, Sharon Murphy, Dave Morgan |
| 56 | 2001 | Walk Away | World of Our Own | Carlsson, Kreuger, Nylen, Magnusson |
| 57 | 2001 | Love Crime | World of Our Own | McFadden, Filan, Romdhane, Larossi |
| 58 | 2001 | Imaginary Diva | World of Our Own | Feehily, Byrne, Egan |
| 59 | 2001 | Bad Girls | World of Our Own (Deluxe Edition) | Romdhane, C. Lieberman, Larossi, Savan Kotecha |
| 60 | 2002 | Crying Girl | World of Our Own (Deluxe Edition) | McFadden, Robson |
| 61 | 2002 | I Promise You That | World of Our Own (Deluxe Edition) | Lilli Sjöberg, Jarl, Jonsson |
| 62 | 2002 | You Don't Know | World of Our Own (Deluxe Edition) | McFadden, Egan, Byrne, Feehily, Filan |
| 63 | 2002 | Never Knew I Was Losing You | Unbreakable | McFadden, Egan, Byrne, Feehily, Filan |
| 64 | 2002 | Unbreakable | Unbreakable: The Greatest Hits Volume 1 | John Reid, Elofsson |
| 65 | 2002 | Written in the Stars | Unbreakable: The Greatest Hits Volume 1 | Carlsson, David Stenmarck, Jarl |
| 66 | 2002 | Love Takes Two | Unbreakable: The Greatest Hits Volume 1 | Mac, Hector |
| 67 | 2002 | How Does It Feel | Unbreakable: The Greatest Hits Volume 1 | Romdhane, Larossi, McFadden, Filan |
| 68 | 2002 | Tonight | Unbreakable: The Greatest Hits Volume 1 | Elofsson, Mac, Hector |
| 69 | 2003 | Where We Belong | Tonight/Miss You Nights | Byrne, Egan, Feehily, Filan, McFadden |
| 70 | 2003 | I Won't Let You Down | Hey Whatever | Byrne, Egan, Feehily, Filan, McFadden |
| 71 | 2003 | Singing Forever | Hey Whatever | Byrne, Egan, Feehily, Filan, McFadden |
| 72 | 2003 | Heal | Turnaround | Jarl, Kotecha |
| 73 | 2003 | Obvious | Turnaround | Pilot, Carlsson, Kotecha |
| 74 | 2003 | When a Woman Loves Man | Turnaround | Romdhane, Kotecha |
| 75 | 2003 | On My Shoulder | Turnaround | Mac, Hector |
| 76 | 2003 | Turn Around | Turnaround | Mac, Hector |
| 77 | 2003 | I Did It for You | Turnaround | Diane Warren |
| 78 | 2003 | Thank You | Turnaround | Perry, Mac, Hector |
| 79 | 2003 | Home | Turnaround | Mac, Hector |
| 80 | 2003 | What Do They Know? | Turnaround | J. McCarthy, Mac, Hector |
| 81 | 2003 | You See Friends (I See Lovers) | Mandy | Byrne, Egan, Feehily, Filan, McFadden |
| 82 | 2004 | I'm Missing Loving You | Obvious | Byrne, Egan, Feehily, Filan, McFadden |
| 83 | 2005 | Amazing | Face to Face | Kristian Lundin, Jake Schulze, Kotecha |
| 84 | 2005 | That's Where You Find Love | Face to Face | Farren, Mac, Hector |
| 85 | 2005 | Hit You With the Real Thing | Face to Face | Carl Bjorsell, Carl Falk, Didrik Thott, Kotecha, Sebastian Thott |
| 86 | 2005 | Change Your Mind | Face to Face | Mac, Hector |
| 87 | 2005 | Maybe Tomorrow | Face to Face (UK Version) | Bjorsell, Didrik Thott, Sebastian Thott |
| 89 | 2005 | Miss You When I'm Dreaming | Amazing | Filan, Feehily, Kreuger, Magnusson |
| 88 | 2006 | Still Here | The Love Album (Deluxe Edition) | Lundin, Kotecha |
| 90 | 2007 | Us Against the World | Back Home | Birgisson, Yacoub, Kotecha |
| 91 | 2007 | Something Right | Back Home | Birgisson, Yacoub, Kotecha |
| 92 | 2007 | When I'm With You | Back Home | Jordan Omley, Louis Biancanello, Michael Mani, Sam Watters, The Jam, The Runaways |
| 93 | 2007 | It's You | Back Home | Mac, Hector |
| 94 | 2007 | Catch My Breath | Back Home | Mac, Hector |
| 95 | 2007 | The Easy Way | Back Home | Birgisson, Yacoub, Kotecha |
| 96 | 2007 | I Do (The Best Is Yet to Come) | Back Home | Mac, Hector, Reid |
| 97 | 2007 | Pictures In My Head | Back Home | Birgisson, Yacoub, Kotecha |
| 98 | 2007 | You Must Have Had a Broken Heart | Back Home | Elofsson, Nicky Chinn |
| 99 | 2008 | Get Away | Us Against the World/Something Right | Michael Busbee, Mac |
| 100 | 2009 | Leaving | Where We Are | Bryn Christopher, Falk, Steven Lee Olsen |
| 101 | 2009 | No More Heroes | Where We Are | Emmanuel Kiriakou, Lindy Robbins, Kotecha |
| 102 | 2009 | How to Break a Heart | Where We Are | James Scheffer, Jim Jonsin, Biancanello, Watters |
| 103 | 2009 | Shadows^{A} | Where We Are | Ryan Tedder, A. J. McLean |
| 104 | 2009 | Talk Me Down^{A} | Where We Are | Simon Petty |
| 105 | 2009 | Where We Are | Where We Are | Tedder, Kotecha |
| 106 | 2009 | The Difference | Where We Are | Anne Preven, Brian Kennedy Seals, Scott Cutler |
| 107 | 2009 | As Love Is My Witness^{A} | Where We Are | Conner Reeves, Jonathan Shorten |
| 108 | 2009 | Another World | Where We Are | Sophie Delila, Steve Booker |
| 109 | 2009 | Sound of a Broken Heart | Where We Are | Reid, Biancanello, Wayne Wilkins |
| 110 | 2009 | Reach Out | Where We Are | Chris Braide, Shaznay Lewis, Feehily |
| 111 | 2009 | I'll See You Again | Where We Are | Andy Hill, Shelly Poole |
| 112 | 2010 | Safe | Gravity | James Grundler, John Shanks |
| 113 | 2010 | Beautiful Tonight | Gravity | John Shanks, Paul Barry |
| 114 | 2010 | I Will Reach You | Gravity | Jamie Hartman, Steve Anderson, Feehily |
| 115 | 2010 | Closer | Gravity | Reid, Shanks, Feehily, Filan, Egan, Byrne |
| 116 | 2010 | Tell Me It's Love | Gravity | Shanks, Hector |
| 117 | 2010 | I Get Weak | Gravity | Shanks, Kotecha |
| 118 | 2010 | Before It's Too Late | Gravity | Anderson, Feehily, Petty |
| 119 | 2010 | No One's Gonna Sleep Tonight | Gravity | Shanks, Hector |
| 120 | 2010 | Difference In Me | Gravity | Shanks, Hector |
| 121 | 2010 | Too Hard to Say Goodbye | Gravity | Shanks, Filan, Byrne, Feehily, Egan |
| 122 | 2011 | Lighthouse | Greatest Hits | Gary Barlow, Shanks |
| 123 | 2011 | Beautiful World | Greatest Hits | Shanks, Ruth-Anne Cunningham, Feehily |
| 124 | 2011 | Wide Open | Greatest Hits | Grundler, Shanks |
| 125 | 2011 | Last Mile of the Way | Greatest Hits | Byrne, Filan, Dimitri Ehrlich, Coyle Girelli |
| 126 | 2011 | Poet's Heart | Lighthouse | Shanks, Cunningham |
| 127 | 2019 | Hello My Love | Spectrum | Mac, Ed Sheeran |
| 128 | 2019 | Better Man | Spectrum | Fred Again, Mac, Sheeran |
| 129 | 2019 | Dynamite | Spectrum | Mac, Sheeran |
| 130 | 2019 | My Blood | Spectrum | Mac, Sheeran |
| 131 | 2019 | Dance | Spectrum | Luka Kloser, Zach Skelton, Casey Smith, Tedder |
| 132 | 2019 | One Last Time | Spectrum | Mac, Sheeran |
| 133 | 2019 | Take Me There | Spectrum | Feehily, Filan, Mac, Camille Purcell |
| 134 | 2019 | Repair | Spectrum | James Bay, Mac |
| 135 | 2019 | Without You | Spectrum | Bay, Mac |
| 136 | 2019 | L.O.V.E | Spectrum | Feehily, Filan, Mac, Purcell |
| 137 | 2019 | Another Life | Spectrum | Alex Charles, Tom Williams |
| 138 | 2021 | Starlight | Wild Dreams | Feehily, Filan, Tom Grennan, Mike Needle, Jamie Scott, Daniel Bryer, Peter Rycroft |
| 139 | 2021 | Alone Together | Wild Dreams | Feehily, Filan, Yacoub, Ilya Salmanzadeh, Michael Pollock, Gregory Hein |
| 140 | 2021 | Wild Dreams | Wild Dreams | Feehily, Filan, Yacoub, Richard "Liohn" Zastenker, Johannes Klahr |
| 141 | 2021 | Lifeline | Wild Dreams | Feehily, Filan, Amy Wadge |
| 142 | 2021 | Alive | Wild Dreams | Byrne, Jimmy Rainsford, Ryan Hennessey |
| 143 | 2021 | Rewind | Wild Dreams | Feehily, Filan, Wadge, Nicholas James Gale, Jessica Agombar |
| 144 | 2021 | Do You Ever Think of Me | Wild Dreams | Alexander Ryberg, Cassandra Stroberg, Niklas Carson Mattsson |
| 145 | 2021 | My Hero | Wild Dreams | Hector, Mac, Sheeran |
| 146 | 2021 | End of Time | Wild Dreams | Stephen Garrigan, Phillip Magee, Cian MacSweeny |
| 147 | 2021 | Magic | Wild Dreams | Feehily, Filan, Scott, Williams, Charles |
| 148 | 2021 | Always With Me | Wild Dreams | Feehily, Filan, Garrigan, Magee, MacSweeny |
| 149 | 2025 | Chariot | 25 - The Ultimate Collection | Mac, Sheeran, Johnny McDaid, Will Reynolds |
| 150 | 2026 | First Time Feeling | 25 - The Ultimate Collection | Mac, Ed Drewett |
| 151 | 2026 | Beautiful Life | 25 - The Ultimate Collection | Mac, Drewett |

^{A} The song has a mastered version of a different artist but was not included and released on any of the said artist's album.

== Covers ==
13 songs among these have become official singles as the lead artist, two renditions as a featured artist, six as promotional singles, and seven are included on their other charted songs list.

| | Year | Song | Album/Single | Originally By |
|---|---|---|---|---|
| 1 | 2000 | If I Had Words (with The Vards)^{B} | Coast to Coast | Scott Fitzgerald and Yvonne Keeley |
| 2 | 1999 | Forever | Swear It Again | Damage |
| 3 | 1999 | I Have a Dream | Westlife (Australian Version), Coast to Coast (UK Version) | ABBA |
| 4 | 1999 | Seasons in the Sun | Westlife | Jacques Brel |
| 5 | 1999 | More Than Words | Westlife | Extreme |
| 6 | 2000 | Against All Odds (with Mariah Carey) | Coast to Coast | Phil Collins |
| 7 | 2000 | Uptown Girl | Coast to Coast, World of Our Own (UK Version) | Billy Joel |
| 8 | 2000 | No Place That Far | Coast to Coast | Sara Evans |
| 9 | 2000 | My Girl | Coast to Coast (Deluxe Edition) | The Temptations |
| 10 | 2000 | What Becomes of the Broken Hearted | Coast to Coast (Deluxe Edition) | Jimmy Ruffin |
| 11 | 2000 | I'll Be There | Coast to Coast (Deluxe Edition) | The Jackson 5 |
| 12 | 2001 | Angel | World of Our Own | Sarah McLachlan |
| 13 | 2002 | Back at One (with Lulu) | Together (Lulu's album) | Brian McKnight |
| 14 | 2002 | Miss You Nights | Unbreakable - The Greatest Hits Vol. 1 | Cliff Richard |
| 15 | 2003 | Daytime Friends, Nighttime Lovers^{B} | | Kenny Rogers |
| 16 | 2003 | Hey Whatever | Turnaround | Relish |
| 17 | 2003 | Mandy | Turnaround | Barry Manilow |
| 18 | 2003 | Greased Lightning | Mandy | John Travolta |
| 19 | 2003 | To Be with You | Turnaround | Mr. Big |
| 20 | 2003 | Lost In You | Turnaround (UK Version) | Garth Brooks |
| 21 | 2004 | Ain't That a Kick in the Head? | Allow Us to Be Frank | Dean Martin |
| 22 | 2004 | Smile | Allow Us to Be Frank | Nat King Cole |
| 23 | 2004 | Fly Me to the Moon | Allow Us to Be Frank | Frank Sinatra |
| 24 | 2004 | Let There Be Love | Allow Us to Be Frank | Van Alexander |
| 25 | 2004 | The Way You Look Tonight | Allow Us to Be Frank | Fred Astaire |
| 26 | 2004 | Come Fly with Me | Allow Us to Be Frank | Frank Sinatra |
| 27 | 2004 | Mack the Knife | Allow Us to Be Frank | Louis Armstrong |
| 28 | 2004 | I Left My Heart in San Francisco | Allow Us to Be Frank | Tony Bennett |
| 29 | 2004 | Summer Wind | Allow Us to Be Frank | Frank Sinatra |
| 30 | 2004 | Clementine | Allow Us to Be Frank | Percy Montrose |
| 31 | 2004 | When I Fall in Love | Allow Us to Be Frank | Victor Young |
| 32 | 2004 | Moon River | Allow Us to Be Frank (UK Version) | Audrey Hepburn |
| 33 | 2004 | That's Life | Allow Us to Be Frank | Frank Sinatra |
| 34 | 2004 | Beyond the Sea | | Bobby Darin |
| 35 | 2005 | You Raise Me Up | Face to Face | Secret Garden |
| 36 | 2005 | When You Tell Me That You Love Me (with Diana Ross) | Face to Face | Diana Ross |
| 37 | 2005 | White Christmas | When You Tell Me That You Love Me | Bing Crosby |
| 38 | 2005 | She's Back | Face to Face | Human Nature |
| 39 | 2005 | Desperado | Face to Face | The Eagles |
| 40 | 2005 | In This Life | Face to Face | Collin Raye |
| 41 | 2005 | Heart Without a Home | Face to Face | Nick Carter |
| 42 | 2005 | Color My World^{A} | Face to Face | Backstreet Boys |
| 43 | 2005 | No More Tears (Enough Is Enough) (with Donna Summer) | Discomania (Donna Summer's album) | Donna Summer and Barbra Streisand |
| 44 | 2006 | The Rose | The Love Album | Bette Midler |
| 45 | 2006 | Total Eclipse of the Heart | The Love Album | Bonnie Tyler |
| 46 | 2006 | All Out of Love (with Delta Goodrem) | The Love Album | Air Supply |
| 47 | 2006 | You Light Up My Life | The Love Album | Debby Boone |
| 48 | 2006 | Easy | The Love Album | The Commodores |
| 49 | 2006 | You Are So Beautiful (To Me) | The Love Album | Billy Preston |
| 50 | 2006 | Have You Ever Been in Love | The Love Album | Leo Sayer |
| 51 | 2006 | Love Can Build a Bridge | The Love Album | The Judds |
| 52 | 2006 | The Dance | The Love Album | Garth Brooks |
| 53 | 2006 | All or Nothing | The Love Album | O-Town |
| 54 | 2006 | You've Lost That Loving Feeling | The Love Album | The Righteous Brothers |
| 55 | 2006 | If | The Love Album (Deluxe Edition) | Bread |
| 56 | 2006 | Solitaire | The Love Album (Deluxe Edition) | Neil Sedaka |
| 57 | 2006 | Nothing's Gonna Change My Love for You | The Love Album (Deluxe Edition) | George Benson |
| 58 | 2007 | Butterfly Kisses | The Love Album (Deluxe Edition) | Bob Carlisle |
| 59 | 2007 | Home | Back Home | Michael Bublé |
| 60 | 2007 | Hard to Say I'm Sorry | Home | Chicago |
| 61 | 2007 | I'm Already There | Back Home | Lonestar |
| 62 | 2007 | Have You Ever? | Back Home | Brandy |
| 63 | 2009 | What About Now | Where We Are | Daughtry |
| 64 | 2010 | Everybody Hurts | Helping Haiti | R.E.M. |
| 65 | 2010 | Please Stay | Safe | The Drifters |
| 66 | 2010 | Chances | Gravity | Athlete |
| 67 | 2010 | The Reason | Gravity | Hoobastank |
| 68 | 2011 | Over and Out^{A} | Greatest Hits | Newton Faulkner |
| 69 | 2024 | Love + Courage | Non-album single | Johnny Zhang |
| 70 | 2026 | Your Love Amazes Me | 25 - The Ultimate Collection | John Berry |

^{A} The song has a mastered version of a different artist but was not included and released on any of the said artist's album.
^{B} Unreleased

== Remixes ==
This is a list of Westlife song remixes.

| Year | Song | Remix(s) |
|---|---|---|
| 1999 | Swear It Again | Radio Edit; Rokstone Mix; 7' Vocal Mix |
| 1999 | If I Let You Go | Radio Edit; Extended Version; USA Mix; Acoustic Version |
| 1999 | Flying Without Wings | Acappella Mix; Acoustic Version |
| 2000 | I Have A Dream | Remix |
| 2000 | Fool Again | 2000 Remix |
| 2000 | Against All Odds | Pound Boys Main Mix; Mariah Carey Version Only; Westlife Version Only^{A} Pound Boys Dub Mix |
| 2000 | My Love | Radio Edit; Rough Audio Mix^{A} Acoustic Version; Instrumental |
| 2000 | What Makes a Man | Single Remix |
| 2001 | I Lay My Love on You | Single Remix |
| 2001 | Uptown Girl | Radio Edit; Extended Version |
| 2001 | Angel's Wings | 2001 Remix |
| 2001 | When You're Looking Like That | Single Remix; 2000 Remix |
| 2001 | Queen of My Heart | Radio Edit |
| 2002 | World Of Our Own | Single Remix; USA Mix; Acoustic Version |
| 2002 | Angel | Remix |
| 2002 | Bop Bop Baby | Single Remix; Almighty Mix Radio Edit |
| 2002 | Imaginary Diva | Orphanz Remix |
| 2003 | Unbreakable | Rough Audio Mix^{A} |
| 2003 | Tonight | Single Remix; Single Edit; Metro Mix; 7" Metro Mix; 12" Metro Mix |
| 2003 | Miss You Nights | Single Remix; Version 2 (Byrne and Egan main vocals included)^{A} |
| 2005 | Mandy | Club Mix |
| 2006 | When You Tell Me That You Love Me | Single Mix |
| 2006 | Amazing | Single Mix |
| 2006 | You Raise Me Up | Alternate Mix^{A} Chameleon Mix^{A} Reactor Mix^{A} |
| 2007 | Total Eclipse Of The Heart | Sunset Strippers Radio Edit Mix; Sunset Strippers Verse Club Mix; Sunset Strippers Dub Mix; Jim Steinman Remix^{A} |
| 2007 | Home | Soulseekerz Mix; Soulseekerz Mix Radio Edit; Ashanti Boyz Remix^{A} |
| 2008 | Us Against The World | The Wideboys Remix; The Wideboys Remix Full Length |
| 2008 | Something Right | Single Mix; Single Mix Instrumental |
| 2008 | I'm Already There | Ashanti Boyz Remix |
| 2010 | Safe | Single Mix |
| 2019 | Hello My Love | Acoustic version Instrumental version John Gibbons remix, remix instrumental, extended mix, extended mix instrumental |
| 2019 | Better Man | Orchestral version Acoustic version |
| 2019 | Dynamite | Midnight Mix; Cahill Remix |
| 2021 | Starlight | Kat Krazy Remix |

^{A} The following remixes were not included and released on any album. Hence, it appeared and leaked on the internet at that time.

== B-sides ==
| Year | Single | B-sides | |
| Year | Single | Songs | Remixes |
|---|---|---|---|
| 1999 | "Swear It Again" | "Until the End of Time", "Forever", "Everybody Knows", "Let's Make Tonight Special", "Don't Calm the Storm" | "Swear It Again (Rokstone Mix)" |
| 1999 | "If I Let You Go" | "Try Again" | "If I Let You Go (Extended Version)" |
| 1999 | "Flying Without Wings" | "Everybody Knows", "That's What It's All About" | "Flying Without Wings (A Capella Mix)" |
| 1999 | "I Have a Dream"/"Seasons in the Sun" | "On the Wings of Love" | |
| 2000 | "Fool Again" | "Tunnel Of Love" | |
| 2000 | "Against All Odds (Take a Look at Me Now)" (with Mariah Carey) | | "Against All Odds (Pound Boys Main Mix)", "Against All Odds (Mariah Only Version)", "Against All Odds (Pound Boys Dub Mix)" |
| 2000 | "My Love" | | "If I Let You Go (US Mix)", "My Love (Instrumental)" |
| 2000 | "What Makes a Man" | "I'll Be There", "My Girl", "What Becomes of the Brokenhearted" | |
| 2001 | "Uptown Girl" | "Angel's Wings", "Close Your Eyes" | "Angel's Wings (2001 Remix)" |
| 2001 | "I Lay My Love On You" | "Dreams Come True", "Nothing Is Impossible" | |
| 2001 | "When You're Looking Like That" | "Con Lo Bien Que Te Ves", "Don’t Get Me Wrong", "I’ll Be There" | |
| 2001 | "Queen Of My Heart" | "Reason For Living", "My Private Movie" | "When You're Looking Like That (Remix)" |
| 2002 | "World Of Our Own" | "Crying Girl", "I Promise You That" | "Angel (Remix)" |
| 2002 | "Bop Bop Baby" | "You Don't Know" | "Imaginary Diva (Orphanz Remix)", "Bop Bop Baby (Almighty Radio Edit)" |
| 2002 | "Unbreakable" | "Never Knew I Was Losing You", "Evergreen" | "World Of Our Own (US Mix)" |
| 2003 | "Tonight"/"Miss You Nights" | "Where We Belong" | "Tonight (12" Metro Mix)" |
| 2003 | "Mandy" | "Flying Without Wings (Live 2003)", "You See Friends (I See Lovers)", "Greased Lightnin'" | |
| 2004 | "Obvious" | "I'm Missing Loving You", "To Be With You (Live)", "Lost In You" | "Westlife Hits Medley" |
| 2005 | "You Raise Me Up" | | "World Of Our Own (Acoustic Version)", "Flying Without Wings (Acoustic Version)", "My Love (Acoustic Version)" |
| 2005 | "When You Tell Me That You Love Me" (with Diana Ross) | "White Christmas", "The Way You Look Tonight" | "If I Let You Go (Acoustic Version)" |
| 2006 | "Amazing" | "Still Here", "Miss You When I'm Dreaming" | |
| 2006 | "The Rose" | "Solitaire", "Nothing's Gonna Change My Love For You", "If" | |
| 2007 | "Home" | "Hard To Say I'm Sorry" | "Total Eclipse of the Heart (Sunset Strippers Remix)", "Home (Soul Seekerz Radio Edit)" |
| 2008 | "Us Against The World" | "Get Away" | "I'm Already There (Ashanti Boyz Remix)", "Us Against The World (The Wideboys Remix)" |
| 2008 | "Something Right" | "Get Away" | "Something Right (Single Mix)", "Something Right (Instrumental)" |
| 2009 | "What About Now" | | "You Raise Me Up (Live)" |
| 2010 | "Safe" | "Please Stay" | |
| 2011 | "Lighthouse" | "Poet's Heart" | |

== Recorded concert live tracks ==
All filmed concert tracks are uploaded on Westlife's official YouTube page or released in an official video album.

=== Recorded filmed concert original tracks ===
| | Year | Song^{A} | Originating album | Notes |
|---|---|---|---|---|
| 1 | 2000 | Open Your Heart | Westlife | First video track from Live in Jakarta, Indonesia |
| 2 | 2000 - 2025 | If I Let You Go | If I Let You Go | Second video track from Live in Jakarta, Indonesia, Third video track from Where Dreams Come True Tour, Second video track from Unbreakable Tour, Third video track from The No 1's Tour, Seventh video track from Back Home Tour, Eighth video track from Where We Are Tour, Fifth video track from Greatest Hits Tour, Eighth video track from The Twenty Tour |
| 3 | 2000 | I Don't Wanna Fight | Westlife | Third video track from Live in Jakarta, Indonesia |
| 4 | 2000 | I Need You | Westlife | Fourth video track from Live in Jakarta, Indonesia |
| 5 | 2000 - 2008, 2019, 2022, 2025 | Fool Again | Westlife | Sixth video track from Live in Jakarta, Indonesia, Twelfth video track from Where Dreams Come True Tour, Tenth video track from Unbreakable Tour, Twelfth video track and second medley from Back Home Tour, Fourteenth video track and second medley from The Twenty Tour |
| 6 | 2000, 2001, 2003, 2004, 2005, 2006, 2008, 2010, 2012, 2019, 2022, 2025 | Flying Without Wings | Flying Without Wings | Eighth video track from Live in Jakarta, Indonesia, Fifteenth video track from Where Dreams Come True Tour, Fourth video track from Unbreakable Tour, Fifth video track from Turnaround Tour, Fifteenth video track from The No. 1's Tour, First video track from Face to Face Tour, Seventeenth video track from Back Home Tour, Fourteenth video track from Where We Are Tour, Fourteenth video track from Greatest Hits Tour, Nineteenth video track from The Twenty Tour |
| 7 | 2000, 2001 | No No | Westlife | Ninth video track from Live in Jakarta, Indonesia, Second video track from Where Dreams Come True Tour |
| 8 | 2000, 2001, 2003, 2004, 2005, 2006, 2008, 2010, 2012, 2019, 2022, 2025 | Swear It Again | Swear It Again | Tenth track from Live in Jakarta, Indonesia, Fourth video track from Where Dreams Come True Tour, Eleventh video track from Unbreakable Tour, Sixth video track from Turnaround Tour, Seventh video track from The No. 1's Tour, Eleventh video track from Face to Face Tour, Sixteenth video track from Back Home Tour, Sixth video track from Where We Are Tour, Eleventh video track from the second medley from Greatest Hits Tour, Second video track from The Twenty Tour |
| 9 | 2000 | Number 1's Medley | Coast to Coast - Up, Close and Personal | First video track from Coast to Coast - Up, Close, and Personal |
| 10 | 2000, 2001, 2003, 2004, 2005, 2006, 2008, 2010, 2012, 2019, 2022, 2025 | What Makes a Man | Coast to Coast | Second track from Coast to Coast - Up, Close and Personal, Thirteenth video track from Where Dreams Come True Tour, Fifteenth video track from Unbreakable Tour, Third video track from Turnaround Tour, Fourteenth video track from The No. 1's Tour, Sixteenth video track from Face to Face Tour, Fourth video track from Back Home Tour, Thirteenth video track from Where We Are Tour, Second video track from Greatest Hits Tour, Sixteenth video track from The Twenty Tour |
| 11 | 2000, 2001 | I Lay My Love on You | Coast to Coast | Fourth track from Coast to Coast - Up, Close and Personal, Fourteenth video track from Where Dreams Come True Tour |
| 12 | 2000 | Angel's Wings | Coast to Coast | Fifth track from Coast to Coast - Up, Close and Personal |
| 13 | 2001 | You Make Me Feel | Coast to Coast | Sixth track from Coast to Coast - Up, Close and Personal, Eighth video track from Where Dreams Come True Tour |
| 14 | 2000 | Fragile Heart | Coast to Coast | Seventh track from Coast to Coast - Up, Close and Personal |
| 15 | 2000, 2001, 2003, 2004, 2005, 2008, 2010, 2012, 2019, 2022, 2025 | My Love | Coast to Coast | Eighth track from Coast to Coast - Up, Close, and Personal, Tenth video track from Where Dreams Come True Tour, Fifth video track from Unbreakable Tour, Fifteenth video track from Turnaround Tour, Sixth video track from The No. 1's Tour, Ninth video track from Back Home Tour, Fourth video track from Where We Are Tour, Third video track from Greatest Hits Tour, Fourth video track from The Twenty Tour |
| 16 | 2001 | Dreams Come True | Coast to Coast | First video track from Where Dreams Come True Tour |
| 17 | 2001 | Somebody Needs You | Coast to Coast | Fifth video track from Where Dreams Come True Tour |
| 18 | 2001, 2003, 2004, 2005, 2006, 2008, 2010, 2012, 2019, 2022, 2025 | When You're Looking Like That | Coast to Coast | Ninth video track from Where Dreams Come True Tour; First video track from Unbreakable Tour, Ninth video track from Turnaround Tour, Eighth video track from The No. 1's Tour, Third video track from Face to Face Tour, Eighteenth video track from Back Home Tour, Third video track from Where We Are Tour, Eighteenth video track from Greatest Hits Tour, Fifth video track from The Twenty Tour |
| 19 | 2003, 2004 | Tonight | Unbreakable - The Greatest Hits Vol. 1 | Third video track from Unbreakable Tour, Tenth video track from Turnaround Tour |
| 20 | 2003, 2025 | Bop Bop Baby | World of Our Own | Sixth video track from Unbreakable Tour |
| 21 | 2003, 2006, 2012, 2019, 2022, 2025 | Queen of My Heart | World of Our Own | Seventh video track from Unbreakable Tour, Fifteenth video track from Face to Face Tour, Twelfth video track and second medley track from Back Home Tour, Sixth video track from Greatest Hits Tour, Fifteenth video track from The Twenty Tour |
| 22 | 2003 | Written in the Stars | Unbreakable - The Greatest Hits Vol. 1 | Twelfth video track from Unbreakable Tour |
| 23 | 2003, 2005, 2008, 2019, 2022, 2025 | Unbreakable | Unbreakable - The Greatest Hits Vol. 1 | Thirteenth video track from Unbreakable Tour, Fifth video track from The No. 1's Tour, Twelfth video track and second medley track from Back Home Tour, Thirteenth video track from The Twenty Tour |
| 24 | 2003, 2004, 2005, 2006, 2008, 2010, 2012, 2019, 2022, 2025 | World of Our Own | World of Our Own | Sixteenth video track from Unbreakable Tour, Fourth video track from Turnaround Tour, Thirteenth video track from The No. 1's Tour, Thirteenth video track from Face to Face Tour, Second video track from Back Home Tour, Fifteenth video track from Where We Are Tour, Thirteenth video track from Greatest Hits Tour, Twentieth video track from The Twenty Tour |
| 25 | 2004 | On My Shoulder | Turnaround | Eleventh video track from Turnaround Tour |
| 26 | 2004 | Obvious | Turnaround | Twelfth video track from Unbreakable Tour |
| 27 | 2006, 2008 | Hit You With the Real Thing | Face to Face | Second video track from Face to Face Tour, First video track from Back Home Tour |
| 28 | 2006 | Amazing | Face to Face | Fourth video track from Face to Face Tour |
| 29 | 2006 | She's Back | Face to Face | Fifth video track from Face to Face Tour |
| 30 | 2008 | Something Right | Back Home | Third video track from Back Home Tour |
| 31 | 2008 | The Easy Way | Back Home | Sixth video track from Back Home Tour |
| 32 | 2008 | Catch My Breath | Back Home | Thirteenth video track from Back Home Tour |
| 33 | 2008 | Us Against the World | Back Home | Fifteenth video track from Back Home Tour |
| 34 | 2010 | Where We Are | Where We Are | First video track from Where We Are Tour |
| 35 | 2010 | Shadows | Where We Are | Ninth video track from Where We Are Tour |
| 36 | 2010 | How to Break a Heart | Where We Are | Third track from the first medley video track from Where We Are Tour |
| 37 | 2010 | I'll See You Again | Where We Are | Sixteenth video track from Where We Are Tour |
| 38 | 2012 | Safe | Gravity | Fourth video track from Greatest Hits Tour |
| 39 | 2019, 2022, 2025 | Hello My Love | Spectrum | First video track from The Twenty Tour |
| 40 | 2019 | Better Man | Spectrum | Tenth video track from The Twenty Tour |
| 41 | 2019 | Dynamite | Spectrum | Seventeenth video track from The Twenty Tour |
| 42 | 2022 | Starlight | Wild Dreams | The Wild Dreams Tour with recorded broadcast in ITV |
| 43 | 2025 | Chariot | 25 - The Ultimate Collection | The 25th Anniversary World Tour with recorded broadcast in ITV |

=== Unfilmed recorded concert original tracks ===
| | Year | Song^{A} | Tour/Event |
|---|---|---|---|
| 1 | 2002, 2007, 2011, 2024 | World of Our Own | World of Our Own Tour; The Love Tour; Gravity Tour, With Love Tour |
| 2 | 2002, 2012, 2024 | Bop Bop Baby | World of Our Own Tour; Greatest Hits Tour (some dates only), With Love Tour |
| 3 | 2002 | Why Do I Love You | World of Our Own Tour |
| 4 | 2002 | Bad Girls | World of Our Own Tour |
| 5 | 2002, 2007, 2024 | Fool Again | World of Our Own Tour, The Love Tour (European dates only), With Love Tour |
| 6 | 2002, 2012, 2022, 2024 | I Lay My Love on You | World of Our Own Tour, Greatest Hits Tour (some dates only), The Wild Dreams Tour (some dates only), With Love Tour |
| 7 | 2002, 2007, 2011, 2024 | Swear It Again | World of Our Own Tour, The Love Tour, Gravity Tour, With Love Tour |
| 8 | 2002, 2007, 2011, 2024 | What Makes a Man | World of Our Own Tour, The Love Tour, Gravity Tour, With Love Tour |
| 9 | 2002, 2007, 2024 | If I Let You Go | World of Our Own Tour, The Love Tour, With Love Tour |
| 10 | 2002 | Don't Say It's Too Late | World of Our Own Tour |
| 11 | 2002 | Imaginary Diva | World of Our Own Tour |
| 12 | 2002 | If Your Heart's Not in It | World of Our Own Tour |
| 13 | 2002 | Queen of My Heart | World of Our Own Tour |
| 14 | 2002, 2007, 2011, 2024 | My Love | World of Our Own Tour, The Love Tour, Gravity Tour, With Love Tour |
| 15 | 2002 | Love Crime | World of Our Own Tour |
| 16 | 2002, 2007, 2011, 2024 | Flying Without Wings | World of Our Own Tour, The Love Tour, Gravity Tour, With Love Tour |
| 17 | 2002 | I Cry | World of Our Own Tour |
| 18 | 2002, 2007, 2011, 2024 | When You're Looking Like That | World of Our Own Tour, The Love Tour, Gravity Tour, With Love Tour |
| 19 | 2007 | Amazing | The Love Tour (African and Australian dates only) |
| 20 | 2007, 2010 | Unbreakable | The Love Tour; Where We Are Tour (some date only) |
| 21 | 2007 | Love Takes Two | The Love Tour (European dates only) |
| 22 | 2010 | Reach Out | Where We Are Tour (Belfast date only) |
| 23 | 2011 | No One's Gonna Sleep Tonight | Gravity Tour (some dates only) |
| 24 | 2011, 2022, 2024 | Safe | Gravity Tour, Wild Dreams Tour (some dates only), With Love Tour (some dates only) |
| 25 | 2011 | Beautiful Tonight | Gravity Tour |
| 26 | 2011, 2012 | I Will Reach You | Gravity Tour; Greatest Hits Tour (some Chinese dates only) |
| 27 | 2012 | Lighthouse | Greatest Hits Tour (some Chinese dates only) |
| 28 | 2012 | Beautiful World | Greatest Hits Tour (some Chinese dates only) |
| 29 | 2022 | Hello My Love | Wild Dreams Tour |
| 30 | 2022 | Better Man | Wild Dreams Tour (some dates only) |
| 31 | 2022 | I Don't Wanna Fight | Wild Dreams Tour (some dates only) |
| 32 | 2022 | No No | Wild Dreams Tour (some dates only) |
| 33 | 2024 | Tunnel of Love | With Love Tour (some dates only) |
| 34 | 2024 | Evergreen | With Love Tour (some dates only) |
| 35 | 2024 | My Hero | With Love Tour (some dates only) |
| 36 | 2024 | Starlight | With Love Tour (some dates only) |

=== Recorded filmed concert cover tracks ===
| | Year | Song^{A} | Tour/Event | Originally By |
|---|---|---|---|---|
| 1 | 2000, 2008 | My Heart Will Go On | Live in Jakarta, Indonesia Instrumental, Back Home Tour Instrumental | Celine Dion |
| 2 | 2000, 2001, 2006 | Seasons in the Sun | Like in Jakarta, Indonesia, Where The Dreams Come True Tour; Face to Face Tour | Terry Jacks |
| 3 | 2000, 2001 | More Than Words | Like in Jakarta, Indonesia, Coast to Coast - Up, Close, and Personal, Where the Dreams Come True Tour Medley | Extreme |
| 4 | 2001, 2019, 2022, 2025 | I Have a Dream | Where the Dreams Come True Tour, The Twenty Tour, Wild Dreams Tour, The 25th Anniversary World Tour | ABBA |
| 5 | 2001 | Buffalo Stance | Where the Dreams Come True Tour Medley | Neneh Cherry |
| 6 | 2001 | Teenage Dirtbag | Where the Dreams Come True Tour Medley | Wheatus |
| 7 | 2001 | Wild Thing | Where the Dreams Come True Tour Medley | Chip Taylor |
| 8 | 2001 | I Can't Get Next to You | Where the Dreams Come True Tour Medley | The Temptations |
| 9 | 2001 | Ain't Too Proud to Beg | Where the Dreams Come True Tour Medley | The Temptations |
| 10 | 2001 | Baby I Need Your Loving | Where the Dreams Come True Tour Medley | Four Tops |
| 11 | 2001 | What Becomes of the Brokenhearted | Where the Dreams Come True Tour Medley | Jimmy Ruffin |
| 12 | 2001, 2004 | My Girl | Where the Dreams Come True Tour, Turnaround Tour | The Temptations |
| 13 | 2001, 2003, 2004, 2005, 2006, 2008, 2010, 2012, 2019, 2022, 2025 | Uptown Girl | Where the Dreams Come True Tour, Unbreakable Tour, Turnaround Tour, The No 1's Tour, Face to Face Tour, Back Home Tour, Where We Are Tour, Greatest Hits Tour, The Twenty Tour, Wild Dreams Tour, 25th Anniversary World Tour | Billy Joel |
| 14 | 2003 | To Be With You | Unbreakable Tour | Mr. Big |
| 15 | 2003 | I Get Around | Unbreakable Tour Medley | The Beach Boys |
| 16 | 2003 | Do You Love Me | Unbreakable Tour Medley | The Contours |
| 17 | 2003 | Twist and Shout | Unbreakable Tour Medley | The Isley Brothers |
| 18 | 2003 | Great Balls of Fire | Unbreakable Tour Medley | Jerry Lee Lewis |
| 19 | 2003 | Kiss | Unbreakable Tour Medley | Prince and the Revolution |
| 20 | 2004 | Help! | Turnaround Tour Medley | The Beatles |
| 21 | 2004 | I'll Be There for You | Turnaround Tour Medley | The Rembrandts |
| 22 | 2004 | Wake Me Up Before You Go-Go | Turnaround Tour Medley | Wham! |
| 23 | 2004 | That's the Way (I Like It) | Turnaround Tour Medley | KC and the Sunshine Band |
| 24 | 2004 | Everybody Needs Somebody to Love | Turnaround Tour Medley | Solomon Burke |
| 25 | 2004, 2005, 2006 | Hey Whatever | Turnaround Tour, The No 1's Tour, Face to Face Tour | Relish |
| 26 | 2004, 2005, 2006, 2008, 2010, 2012, 2019, 2022, 2025 | Mandy | Turnaround Tour, The No. 1's Tour, Face to Face Tour, Back Home Tour, Where We Are Tour, Greatest Hits Tour, The Twenty Tour, Wild Dreams Tour, 25th Anniversary World Tour | Scott English |
| 27 | 2005 | Disco Inferno | The Number Ones Tour Medley | The Trammps |
| 28 | 2005 | Oh, Pretty Woman | The Number Ones Tour Medley | Roy Orbison |
| 29 | 2005 | I Feel Fine | The Number Ones Tour Medley | John Lennon |
| 30 | 2005 | Don't Stop 'til You Get Enough | The Number Ones Tour Medley | Michael Jackson |
| 31 | 2005 | Footloose | The Number Ones Tour Medley | Kenny Loggins |
| 32 | 2005, 2012, 2025 | Ain't That a Kick in the Head | The Number Ones Tour, Greatest Hits Tour, 25th Anniversary World Tour | Dean Martin |
| 33 | 2005 | Smile | The Number Ones Tour | Charlie Chaplin |
| 34 | 2005, 2025 | Mack the Knife | The Number Ones Tour, 25th Anniversary World Tour | Bobby Darin |
| 35 | 2006 | Billie Jean | Face to Face Tour Instrumentals | Michael Jackson |
| 36 | 2006 | I Wish | Face to Face Tour Instrumentals | Stevie Wonder |
| 37 | 2006 | Addicted to Love | Face to Face Tour Medley | Robert Palmer |
| 38 | 2006 | Wild Wild West | Face to Face Tour Medley | Will Smith |
| 39 | 2006 | Senorita | Face to Face Tour Medley | Justin Timberlake and Pharrell |
| 40 | 2006, 2012 | Don't Cha | Face to Face Tour Medley; Greatest Hits Tour Medley | Pussycat Dolls |
| 41 | 2006 | Colour My World | Face to Face Tour | Backstreet Boys (unreleased) |
| 42 | 2006 | The Dance | Face to Face Tour | Garth Brooks |
| 43 | 2006, 2008, 2010, 2012, 2019, 2022, 2025 | You Raise Me Up | Face to Face Tour, Back Home Tour, Where We Are Tour, Greatest Hits Tour, The Twenty Tour, Wild Dreams Tour, 25th Anniversary World Tour | Secret Garden |
| 44 | 2008 | ABC | Back Home Tour Instrumentals | Jackson 5 |
| 45 | 2008 | Where Is the Love? | Back Home Tour Instrumentals | The Black Eyed Peas |
| 46 | 2008 | SexyBack | Back Home Tour Medley | Justin Timberlake |
| 47 | 2008 | Blame It On The Boogie | Back Home Tour Medley | Jackson 5 |
| 48 | 2008 | Get Down On It | Back Home Tour Medley | Kool & The Gang |
| 49 | 2008 | I'm Your Man | Back Home Tour Medley | Wham! |
| 50 | 2008, 2012 | Let Me Entertain You | Back Home Tour Medley, Greatest Hits Tour Medley | Robbie Williams |
| 51 | 2008, 2010, 2012 | I'm Already There | Back Home Tour, Where We Are Tour, Greatest Hits Tour | Lonestar |
| 52 | 2008, 2010, 2012, 2019 | Home | Back Home Tour, Where We Are Tour, Greatest Hits Tour, The Twenty Tour | Michael Buble |
| 53 | 2010, 2012, 2019, 2022, 2025 | What About Now | Where We Are Tour, Greatest Hits Tour, The Twenty Tour, Wild Dreams Tour, 25th Anniversary World Tour | Daughtry |
| 54 | 2010 | All Out of Love | Where We Are Tour | Chicago |
| 55 | 2010, 2012 | I Gotta Feeling | Where We Are Tour Medley, Greatest Hits Tour Medley | The Black Eyed Peas |
| 56 | 2010, 2012 | Sex on Fire | Where We Are Tour Medley, Greatest Hits Tour Medley | Kings of Leon |
| 57 | 2010 | Halo | Where We Are Tour Medley | Beyoncé |
| 58 | 2010 | The Boys Are Back In Town | Where We Are Tour Medley | Thin Lizzy |
| 59 | 2010 | Viva La Vida | Exclusive O2 Dublin gig | Coldplay |
| 60 | 2010 | Please Stay | Exclusive O2 Dublin gig | Burt Bacharach |
| 61 | 2012 | Party Rock Anthem | Greatest Hits Tour Medley | LMFAO |
| 62 | 2012 | Bohemian Rhapsody | Greatest Hits Tour Medley | Queen |
| 63 | 2019 | Another One Bites the Dust | The Twenty Tour Medley | Queen |
| 64 | 2019 | Radio Ga Ga | The Twenty Tour Medley | Queen |
| 65 | 2019 | I Want to Break Free | The Twenty Tour Medley | Queen |
| 66 | 2019 | Somebody to Love | The Twenty Tour Medley | Queen |
| 67 | 2019 | Don't Stop Me Now | The Twenty Tour Medley | Queen |
| 68 | 2019 | We Will Rock You | The Twenty Tour Medley | Queen |
| 69 | 2019 | We Are the Champions | The Twenty Tour Medley | Queen |
| 70 | 2022 | Mamma Mia | The Wild Dreams Tour Medley | ABBA |
| 71 | 2022 | Gimme Gimme Gimme | The Wild Dreams Tour Medley | ABBA |
| 72 | 2022 | Money Money Money | The Wild Dreams Tour Medley | ABBA |
| 73 | 2022 | Take a Chance on Me | The Wild Dreams Tour Medley | ABBA |
| 74 | 2022 | Dancing Queen | The Wild Dreams Tour Medley | ABBA |
| 75 | 2022 | Waterloo | The Wild Dreams Tour Medley | ABBA |
| 76 | 2022 | Thank You for the Music | The Wild Dreams Tour Medley | ABBA |

=== Unfilmed recorded concert cover tracks ===
| | Year | Song^{A} | Tour/Event | Originally By |
|---|---|---|---|---|
| 1 | 1998 | Right Here Waiting | Boyzone's Where We Belong Tour (as supporting act) | Richard Marx |
| 2 | 2002, 2007, 2011, 2024 | Uptown Girl | World of Our Own Tour; The Love Tour; Gravity Tour, With Love Tour | Billy Joel |
| 3 | 2002 | Angel | World of Our Own Tour | Sarah McLachlan |
| 4 | 2002 | Jailhouse Rock | World of Our Own Tour Medley | Elvis Presley |
| 5 | 2002 | Brown Eyed Girl | World of Our Own Tour Medley | Van Morrison |
| 6 | 2002 | Build Me Up Buttercup | World of Our Own Tour Medley | The Foundations |
| 7 | 2002 | Bohemian Rhapsody | World of Our Own Tour Medley | Queen |
| 8 | 2003 | Lost in You | Turnaround Tour (Belfast dates only) | Chris Gaines |
| 9 | 2007 | Total Eclipse of the Heart | The Love Tour | Bonnie Tyler |
| 10 | 2007 | Everybody (Backstreet's Back) | The Love Tour Medley | Backstreet Boys |
| 11 | 2007 | You Got It (The Right Stuff) | The Love Tour Medley | New Kids On The Block |
| 12 | 2007 | Picture Of You | The Love Tour Medley | Boyzone |
| 13 | 2007 | Everything Changes | The Love Tour Medley | Take That |
| 14 | 2007 | When Will I Be Famous | The Love Tour Medley | Bros |
| 15 | 2007 | You Are So Beautiful | The Love Tour | Joe Cocker |
| 16 | 2007 | Easy | The Love Tour | The Commodores |
| 17 | 2007 | Love Can Build a Bridge | The Love Tour | The Judds |
| 18 | 2007 | The Rose | The Love Tour | Bette Midler |
| 19 | 2010 | Singin' in the Rain | Where We Are Tour (some dates only) | Nacio Herb Brown |
| 20 | 2011 | Viva La Vida | Gravity Tour Medley | Coldplay |
| 21 | 2011 | Only Girl (In the World) | Gravity Tour Medley | Rihanna |
| 22 | 2011 | The Time (Dirty Bit) | Gravity Tour Medley | Black Eyed Peas |
| 23 | 2011 | Bad Romance | Gravity Tour Medley | Lady Gaga |
| 24 | 2011 | I Predict a Riot | Gravity Tour Medley and Instrumentals (some dates only) | Kaiser Chiefs |
| 25 | 2011 | Don't Worry, Be Happy | Gravity Tour Medley and Instrumentals (some dates only) | Bobby McFerrin |
| 26 | 2011 | Mr. Vain | Gravity Tour Medley and Instrumentals (some dates only) | Culture Beat |
| 27 | 2011 | Rhythm is a Dancer | Gravity Tour Medley and Instrumentals (some dates only) | Snap! |
| 28 | 2011, 2012, 2022, 2024 | Seasons in the Sun | Gravity Tour; Greatest Hits Tour (some dates only); Wild Dreams Tour (some dates only), With Love Tour | Terry Jacks |
| 29 | 2011, 2012, 2022 | I'm Already There | Gravity Tour; Greatest Hits Tour (some dates only); Wild Dreams Tour (some dates only) | Lonestar |
| 30 | 2012 | Against All Odds (Take a Look at Me Now) | Greatest Hits Tour (some dates only) | Phil Collins |
| 31 | 2021 | The Ordinary Road | Wild Dreams Tour (some dates only) | Pu Shu |
| 32 | 2022 | Nothing's Gonna Change My Love For You | Wild Dreams Tour (some dates only), With Love Tour (some dates only) | George Benson |
| 33 | 2024 | More Than Words | Wild Dreams Tour (some dates only), With Love Tour (some dates only) | Extreme |
| 34 | 2024 | Beautiful in White | With Love Tour (some dates only) | Shane Filan |
| 35 | 2024 | To Be With You | With Love Tour (some dates only) | Mr. Big |
| 36 | 2024 | Home | With Love Tour (some dates only) | Michael Buble |
| 37 | 2024 | We Will Rock You | With Love Tour (some dates only) | Queen |
| 38 | 2024 | We Are the Champions | With Love Tour (some dates only) | Queen |

^{A} In order of appearance

== Other recorded live event performances ==
=== Recorded originals ===
| | Year started | Song performed^{A} | Notes |
|---|---|---|---|
| 1 | 1997 | Together Girl Forever | as IOYOU |
| 2 | 1998 | Good Thing | as IOYOU |
| 3 | 1998 | Flying Without Wings | as Westside, Westlife; First television live performance of the group, in RTÉ, The Late Late Show, in Ireland, and worldwide. |
| 4 | 1998 | Swear It Again | as Westside, Westlife; Smash Hits Poll Party |
| 5 | 1999 | Try Again | as Westlife |
| 6 | 1999 | If I Let You Go | as Westlife |
| 7 | 2000 | Fool Again | as Westlife |
| 8 | 2000 | No No | as Westlife |
| 8 | 2000 | I Don't Wanna Fight | as Westlife |
| 9 | 2000 | Can't Lose What You Never Had | as Westlife |
| 10 | 2000 | My Private Movie | as Westlife |
| 11 | 2000 | My Love | as Westlife |
| 12 | 2000 | Close | as Westlife |
| 13 | 2000 | What Makes a Man | as Westlife |
| 14 | 2000, 2001 | I Lay My Love on You | as Westlife |
| 15 | 2000 | Angel's Wings | as Westlife |
| 16 | 2000 | Fragile Heart | as Westlife |
| 17 | 2000 | You Make Me Feel | as Westlife |
| 18 | 2001 | When You're Looking Like That | as Westlife |
| 19 | 2001 | Queen of My Heart | as Westlife |
| 20 | 2001 | I Cry | as Westlife |
| 21 | 2001 | Why Do I Love You | as Westlife |
| 22 | 2001, 2002 | World of Our Own | as Westlife |
| 23 | 2002 | Bop Bop Baby | as Westlife |
| 24 | 2002 | Unbreakable | as Westlife |
| 25 | 2002 | Written in the Stars | as Westlife |
| 26 | 2003 | Tonight | as Westlife |
| 27 | 2003 | On My Shoulder | as Westlife |
| 28 | 2003 | Obvious | as Westlife |
| 29 | 2006 | Amazing | as Westlife |
| 30 | 2008 | Us Against the World | as Westlife |
| 31 | 2008 | Something Right | as Westlife |
| 32 | 2009 | I'll See You Again | as Westlife |
| 33 | 2009 | The Difference | as Westlife |
| 34 | 2009 | Shadows | as Westlife |
| 35 | 2010 | Safe | as Westlife |
| 36 | 2010 | I Will Reach You | as Westlife |
| 37 | 2010 | Beautiful Tonight | as Westlife |
| 38 | 2011 | Lighthouse | as Westlife |
| 39 | 2011 | Beautiful World | as Westlife |
| 40 | 2019 | Hello My Love | as Westlife |
| 41 | 2019 | Better Man | as Westlife |
| 42 | 2019 | Dynamite | as Westlife |
| 43 | 2019 | My Blood | as Westlife |
| 44 | 2021 | Starlight | as Westlife |
| 45 | 2021 | My Hero | as Westlife |
| 46 | 2022 | Alone Together | as Westlife |
| 47 | 2025 | Chariot | as Westlife |

=== Recorded covers ===
| | Year | Song^{A} | Tour/Event | Originally By | Notes |
|---|---|---|---|---|---|
| 1 | 1998 | End of the Road | | Boyz II Men | from Unbreakable DVD |
| 2 | 1999 | Everybody Get Up | | Five | |
| 3 | 1999 | If Tomorrow Never Comes | | Garth Brooks | |
| 4 | 2000 | Seasons in the Sun | | Terry Jacks | |
| 5 | 2000 | More Than Words | | Extreme | |
| 6 | 2000 | I Have a Dream | | ABBA | |
| 7 | 2000 | I'll Never Break Your Heart | John Daly Show | Backstreet Boys | |
| 8 | 2000 | Lollipop | | Ronald & Ruby | |
| 9 | 2000 | My Girl | | The Temptations | |
| 10 | 2000 | What Becomes of the Brokenhearted | | Jimmy Ruffin | |
| 11 | 2000 | Snow Is Falling | The Dome 2000 | Chris de Burgh | |
| 12 | 2000 | Auld Lang Syne | | Robert Burns | |
| 13 | 2001 | Never Can Say Goodbye | Children in Need | Jackson 5 | |
| 14 | 2001 | Oh Holy Night | Westlife and Friends: Christmas Special | Placide Cappeau | Feehily only |
| 15 | 2001 | Angel | | Sarah McLachlan | |
| 16 | 2002 | Daytime Friends | | Kenny Rogers | |
| 17 | 2002 | Miss You Nights | | Cliff Richard | without Filan only |
| 18 | 2003 | Hey Whatever | | Relish | |
| 19 | 2003 | Mandy | | Scott English | |
| 20 | 2003 | Lost in You | | Chris Gaines | |
| 21 | 2003 | To Be With You | | Mr. Big | |
| 22 | 2003 | You're the One That I Want | Live from Greasemania | John Travolta and Olivia Newton-John | |
| 23 | 2003 | Greased Lightnin' | Live from Greasemania | John Travolta | |
| 24 | 2003 | Karma Chameleon | Live from Taratata, Germany | Culture Club | Byrne only |
| 25 | 2003 | I Wish It Could Be Christmas Everyday | Live from Christmas in Pop World 2003 | Wizzard | |
| 26 | 2004 | Ain't That a Kick in the Head | | Dean Martin | |
| 27 | 2004 | That's Life | | Frank Sinatra | |
| 28 | 2004 | Fly Me to the Moon | | Frank Sinatra | |
| 29 | 2004 | Mack the Knife | | Bobby Darin | |
| 30 | 2004 | Merry Christmas Everybody | Live from Christmas in Pop World 2004 | Slade | |
| 31 | 2005 | You Raise Me Up | | Secret Garden | |
| 32 | 2005 | White Christmas | | Bing Crosby | |
| 33 | 2006 | The Rose | | Bette Midler | |
| 34 | 2006 | Easy | | The Commodores | |
| 35 | 2006 | Love Can Build a Bridge | | The Judds | |
| 36 | 2006 | Santa Claus Is Coming to Town | Night Before Christmas 2006 | Eddie Cantor | |
| 37 | 2007 | Total Eclipse of the Heart | | Bonnie Tyler | |
| 38 | 2007 | Home | | Michael Buble | |
| 39 | 2007 | I'm Already There | | Lonestar | |
| 40 | 2009 | What About Now | | Daughtry | |
| 41 | 2011 | Il Adore | Sunshine Night Time: A Tribute To Leigh Bowery | Boy George | Feehily only |

=== Other recorded appearances ===
| Year | Song^{A} | Notes |
|---|---|---|
| 2000 | "If I Had Words" (The Vard Sisters featuring Westlife) | Non-album single |
| 2001 | "Never Too Far/Hero Medley" (with Mariah Carey) | Live from 2001 Top of the Pops Awards |
| 2001 | "Last Christmas" (Byrne and McFadden only, with Frank Skinner) | |
| 2001 | "Silent Night" (Live) (Sinéad O'Connor featuring Westlife) | Westlife and Friends |
| 2001 | "The Little Drummer Boy" (Live) (Dolores O'Riordan and Westlife) | Live at The Vatican |
| 2002 | "Crazy Horses" (Donny Osmond featuring Westlife) | An Audience with Donny Osmond |
| 2002 | "Swear It Again" (Dean Verbeeck and Westlife) | Pop Idol |
| 2002 | "Back at One" (Lulu featuring Westlife) | Together |
| 2003 | "Walking in the Air" (Mary Black featuring Westlife) | |
| 2003 | "Heaven" (with Do) | Live from 2003 TMF Awards |
| 2003 | "That's What Friends Are For" (Live from Royal Variety Performance with Various Artists) | |
| 2004 | "No More Tears (Enough Is Enough)" (Donna Summer featuring Westlife) | Discomania |
| 2004 | "Beyond the Sea" (Westlife and Kevin Spacey) | |
| 2004 | "Fly Me to the Moon" (Westlife and Kevin Spacey) | |
| 2004 | "The Way You Look Tonight" (Westlife and Joanne Hindley) | |
| 2005 | "You Raise Me Up" (Secret Garden featuring Westlife) | Nobel Peace Prize Concert Live |
| 2005 | "You Raise Me Up" (Live) (Wang Leehom and Westlife) | Non-album single |
| 2005 | "When You Tell Me That You Love Me" (Westlife featuring Diana Ross) | When You Tell Me That You Love Me |
| 2006 | "All Out of Love" (Westlife and Delta Goodrem) | |
| 2006 | "Easy" (Lionel Richie featuring Westlife) | |
| 2006 | "Oh, Pretty Woman" (Live) (Roy Orbison featuring Westlife) | Duet Impossible |
| 2006 | "That's Life" (Ray Quinn and Westlife) | The X Factor UK Live |
| 2007 | "The Dance" (Ronan Keating and Westlife) | |
| 2008 | "Flying Without Wings" (JLS and Westlife) | The X Factor UK Live |
| 2009 | "No Matter What" (Boyzone featuring Westlife) | Tribute Show to Stephen Gately Live |
| 2009 | "Man in the Mirror" (Live) (with Will Smith, Wyclef Jean, Toby Keith, Donna Summer, Esperanza Spalding, Luis Fonsi, Alexander Rybak, Amadou and Mariam, Willow Smith, Jaden Smith, Jada Pinkett Smith, Lang Lang and Natasha Bedingfield) | 2009 Nobel Peace Prize Concert |

^{A} In order of appearance

== Unreleased songs ==
| Song | Notes |
|---|---|
You Are
Miss a Thing
Feelings
Listen Girl
From Now On^{A}
If That's What Love Is^{A}
Back to You
No Maybe No More
This Man's Heart
My Love Song
Now Can't Let Go
The Way That You Love Me
Like a Fool for Love
Collide
Figured You Out
Let It Fall
Miracle
Perfect Ten
Little Piece of Me or A Little Part of Me or Extraordinary Love^{A}
Love Ain't War^{A}
This Life^{A}
When It Comes to Love^{A}
Crying Inside
Never Can Say Goodbye
Alive

== See also ==
- Westlife videography
- Westlife discography
- Westlife tours
- Boy band
- Westlife awards
- List of artists who reached number one on the UK Singles Chart
- List of artists who reached number one in Ireland
