= Unbreakable Tour (Westlife) =

2003 concert tour by Westlife

- Tour by Westlife
- Tour programme
- Location: Europe; Hong Kong
- Associated album: Unbreakable: The Greatest Hits Volume 1
- Start date: 13 April 2003
- End date: 25 October 2003
- No. of shows: 71

Westlife concert chronology
- World of Our Own Tour (2002); Unbreakable Tour (2003); Turnaround Tour (2004)

The Unbreakable Tour was the third concert tour by Irish pop band Westlife seen by 700,000 fans making £14,000,000 which covered the UK and Europe in 2003. There were 62 tour dates, including a few outside concerts including their coming home concerts in their home towns of Dublin and Sligo. This tour was the band's biggest production to date and featured a futuristic sci-fi stage complete with Andy Warhol inspired pop art projections, Las Vegas-style neon signs and the latest in intelligent lighting technology which cost £7 million. This was Brian McFadden's last concert tour as a member of the group.The band was supported by up and coming boyband FY8

== Setlist ==
Set 1

1. "When You're Looking Like That"
2. "If I Let You Go"
3. "Tonight"
4. "Flying Without Wings"

Set 2

5. "My Love"
6. "Bop Bop Baby"
7. "Queen of My Heart"
8. "To Be with You"

Set 3

9. Medley
  1. "I Get Around" - Nicky
  2. "Do You Love Me" - Bryan
  3. "Twist and Shout" - Shane
  4. "Great Balls of Fire" - Kian
  5. "Kiss" - Mark

Set 4

10. "Fool Again"
11. "Swear It Again"
12. ”I Lay My Love On You”
13. "Written in the Stars"
14. "Unbreakable"

Encore

15. "Uptown Girl"
16. "What Makes a Man"
17. "World of Our Own"

== Tour dates ==
Date	City	Country	Venue
Europe
13 April 2003	Cardiff	Wales	Cardiff International Arena
14 April 2003	Cardiff	Wales	Cardiff International Arena
15 April 2003	Cardiff	Wales	Cardiff International Arena
17 April 2003	London	England	London Docklands Arena
21 April 2003	Stuttgart	Germany	Hanns-Martin-Schleyer-Halle
22 April 2003	Nuremberg	Germany	Nuremberg Arena
24 April 2003	Berlin	Germany	Max-Schmeling-Halle
27 April 2003	Zürich	Switzerland	Hallenstadion
29 April 2003	Cologne	Germany	Kölnarena
30 April 2003	Brussels	Belgium	Forest National
1 May 2003	Rotterdam	Netherlands	Rotterdam Ahoy
3 May 2003	Munich	Germany	Olympiahalle
4 May 2003	Frankfurt	Germany	Festhalle Frankfurt
5 May 2003	Hanover	Germany	Preussag Arena
6 May 2003	Hamburg	Germany	Color Line Arena
8 May 2003	Copenhagen	Denmark	Forum Copenhagen
9 May 2003	Oslo	Norway	Oslo Spektrum
10 May 2003	Stockholm	Sweden	Stockholm Globe Arena
11 May 2003	Stockholm	Sweden	Stockholm Globe Arena
12 May 2003	Gothenburg	Sweden	Scandinavium
15 May 2003	Nottingham	England	Nottingham Arena
16 May 2003	Nottingham	England	Nottingham Arena
17 May 2003	Nottingham	England	Nottingham Arena
19 May 2003	Belfast	Northern Ireland	Odyssey Arena
20 May 2003	Belfast	Northern Ireland	Odyssey Arena
21 May 2003	Belfast	Northern Ireland	Odyssey Arena
23 May 2003	Glasgow	Scotland	Scottish Exhibition and Conference Centre
24 May 2003	Glasgow	Scotland	Scottish Exhibition and Conference Centre
25 May 2003	Glasgow	Scotland	Scottish Exhibition and Conference Centre
27 May 2003	Birmingham	England	NEC Arena
28 May 2003	Birmingham	England	NEC Arena
29 May 2003	Birmingham	England	NEC Arena
31 May 2003	Birmingham	England	NEC Arena
1 June 2003	Birmingham	England	NEC Arena
3 June 2003	London	England	Wembley Arena
4 June 2003	London	England	Wembley Arena
5 June 2003	London	England	Wembley Arena
7 June 2003	London	England	Wembley Arena
8 June 2003	London	England	Wembley Arena
10 June 2003	Manchester	England	Manchester Evening News Arena
11 June 2003	Manchester	England	Manchester Evening News Arena
12 June 2003	Manchester	England	Manchester Evening News Arena
14 June 2003	Manchester	England	Manchester Evening News Arena
15 June 2003	Manchester	England	Manchester Evening News Arena
17 June 2003	Belfast	Northern Ireland	Odyssey Arena
18 June 2003	Belfast	Northern Ireland	Odyssey Arena
19 June 2003	Belfast	Northern Ireland	Odyssey Arena
21 June 2003	Belfast	Northern Ireland	Odyssey Arena
22 June 2003	Belfast	Northern Ireland	Odyssey Arena
24 June 2003	Belfast	Northern Ireland	Odyssey Arena
25 June 2003	Belfast	Northern Ireland	Odyssey Arena
27 June 2003	Dublin	Ireland	Lansdowne Road
28 June 2003	Dublin	Ireland	Lansdowne Road
1 July 2003	Newcastle	England	Telewest Arena
2 July 2003	Newcastle	England	Telewest Arena
3 July 2003	Newcastle	England	Telewest Arena
5 July 2003	Newcastle	England	Telewest Arena
6 July 2003	Newcastle	England	Telewest Arena
8 July 2003	Glasgow	Scotland	Scottish Exhibition and Conference Centre
9 July 2003	Glasgow	Scotland	Scottish Exhibition and Conference Centre
10 July 2003	Glasgow	Scotland	Scottish Exhibition and Conference Centre
12 July 2003	Glasgow	Scotland	Scottish Exhibition and Conference Centre
13 July 2003	Glasgow	Scotland	Scottish Exhibition and Conference Centre
15 July 2003	Glasgow	Scotland	Scottish Exhibition and Conference Centre
16 July 2003	Aberdeen	Scotland	Press and Journal Arena
17 July 2003	Aberdeen	Scotland	Press and Journal Arena
18 July 2003	Sheffield	England	Sheffield Arena
19 July 2003	Sheffield	England	Sheffield Arena
21 July 2003	Sheffield	England	Sheffield Arena
22 July 2003	Sheffield	England	Sheffield Arena
25 July 2003	Sligo	Ireland	Markievicz Park
Asia
25 October 2003	Hong Kong		Tamar Site

Cancellations and rescheduled shows

24 April 2003	Brussels, Belgium	Forest National	Moved to 30 April 2003
25 April 2003	Leipzig, Germany	Leipziger Messehalle	Cancelled
26 April 2003	Vienna, Austria	Gasometer	Cancelled

== Video release ==
=== Features ===
- Games (containing exclusive footage)
- Miss You Nights (video)
- Tonight (video)
- Tonight – Remix (video)
- Hey Whatever (video)
- Alternative Edit of When You're Looking Like That
- Documentary
- Interactive Game
- English Dolby Digital 5.1
- English Dolby Digital 2.0
- English Audio Commentary Dolby Digital
- Aspect Ratio: 1.78:1
- Aspect Ratio: 1.85:1
- Discs: 1
- Format: PAL
- Layers: 1
- Running Time: 90 minutes
- Transfer Aspect Ratio: 16:9

=== Credits ===
- Management: Louis Walsh Management Company
- Director: Russell Thomas
- Executive Producer: Robin Wilson
- Producer: Sara Martin
- Support Act: Zoo

=== Chart performance ===
Chart	Peak position
Ireland	1
Sweden Music Videos	6
UK Music Videos	1
UK DVD Videos (OCC)	17
UK Videos (OCC)	19

=== Certifications and sales ===
Region	Certification	Certified units/sales
Denmark (IFPI Danmark)	Platinum	50,000^{^}
United Kingdom (BPI)	3× Platinum	150,000^{^}
^{^} Shipments figures based on certification alone.
