= The No 1's Tour =

2005 concert tour by Westlife

- Tour by Westlife
- Promotional poster for tour
- Location: Asia; Europe; South Africa
- Start date: 1 February 2005
- End date: 17 May 2005
- No. of shows: 50

Westlife concert chronology
- Turnaround Tour (2004); No. 1's Tour (2005); Face to Face Tour (2006)

The No 1's Tour by Irish boy band Westlife. It was seen by 330,000 fans and made £8 million worldwide. The tour was originally called The Red Carpet Tour, but the name was later changed as confusion over the type of show became apparent. The No 1's Tour took place after the band's Rat Pack album Allow Us to Be Frank. It was said to be their smallest-selling concert tour to date according to the band member Shane Filan's My Side of Life book.

== Supporting acts ==
- Bombay Rockers

== Setlist ==
1. "Uptown Girl"
2. "Hey Whatever"
3. "If I Let You Go"
4. "Mandy"
5. "Unbreakable"
6. "My Love"
7. "Swear It Again"
8. "When You're Looking Like That"
9. Medley:
  1. "Disco Inferno"
  2. "Oh, Pretty Woman"
  3. "I Feel Fine"
  4. "Don't Stop 'til You Get Enough"
  5. "Footloose"
10. "Ain't That a Kick in the Head?"
11. "Smile"
12. "Mack the Knife"

Encore

13. "World of Our Own"
14. "What Makes a Man"
15. "Flying Without Wings"

== Tour dates ==
Date	City	Country	Venue
Europe
1 February 2005	Belfast	Northern Ireland	Odyssey Arena
2 February 2005	Belfast	Northern Ireland	Odyssey Arena
4 February 2005	Belfast	Northern Ireland	Odyssey Arena
8 February 2005	Dublin	Ireland	Point Theatre
9 February 2005	Dublin	Ireland	Point Theatre
11 February 2005	Dublin	Ireland	Point Theatre
12 February 2005	Dublin	Ireland	Point Theatre
13 February 2005	Dublin	Ireland	Point Theatre
15 February 2005	Dublin	Ireland	Point Theatre
16 February 2005	Dublin	Ireland	Point Theatre
18 February 2005	Millstreet	Ireland	Millstreet Arena
19 February 2005	Millstreet	Ireland	Millstreet Arena
20 February 2005	Millstreet	Ireland	Millstreet Arena
22 February 2005	London	England	Wembley Arena Pavilion
23 February 2005	London	England	Wembley Arena Pavilion
26 February 2005	Manchester	England	Manchester Evening News Arena
27 February 2005	Manchester	England	Manchester Evening News Arena
1 March 2005	Cardiff	Wales	Cardiff International Arena
2 March 2005	Cardiff	Wales	Cardiff International Arena
6 March 2005	Birmingham	England	NEC Arena
7 March 2005	Birmingham	England	NEC Arena
8 March 2005	Brighton	England	Brighton Centre
10 March 2005	Glasgow	Scotland	Scottish Exhibition and Conference Centre
11 March 2005	Newcastle	England	Metro Radio Arena
12 March 2005	Newcastle	England	Metro Radio Arena
14 March 2005	Glasgow	Scotland	Scottish Exhibition and Conference Centre
15 March 2005	Glasgow	Scotland	Scottish Exhibition and Conference Centre
18 March 2005	Sheffield	England	Hallam FM Arena
19 March 2005	Sheffield	England	Hallam FM Arena
21 March 2005	Brighton	England	Brighton Centre
22 March 2005	Nottingham	England	Nottingham Arena
23 March 2005	Nottingham	England	Nottingham Arena
28 March 2005	Stockholm	Sweden	Stockholm Globe Arena
29 March 2005	Horsens	Denmark	Forum Horsens Arena
30 March 2005	Amsterdam	Netherlands	Heineken Music Hall
1 April 2005	Munich	Germany	Olympiahalle
2 April 2005	Halle in Westfalen	Germany	Gerry Weber Stadion
Africa
5 April 2005	Durban	South Africa	Westridge Park Tennis Stadium
7 April 2005	Port Elizabeth	South Africa	Vodacom NMMU Indoor Sports Centre
8 April 2005	Cape Town	South Africa	Bellville Velodrome
10 April 2005	Johannesburg	South Africa	Coca-Cola Dome
Asia
13 April 2005	Manama	Bahrain	Ritz Carlton, Bahrain Hotel Garden
14 April 2005	Dubai	United Arab Emirates	Dubai Media City Amphitheatre
Europe
25 April 2005	Nottingham	England	Nottingham Arena
3 May 2005	Newcastle	England	Metro Radio Arena
7 May 2005	Millstreet	Ireland	Millstreet Arena
8 May 2005	Millstreet	Ireland	Millstreet Arena
11 May 2005	Dublin	Ireland	Point Theatre
14 May 2005	Dublin	Ireland	Point Theatre
17 May 2005	Cardiff	Wales	Cardiff International Arena

=== Box office score data ===
Venue	City	Tickets sold / available	Gross revenue
Odyssey Arena	Belfast	19,977 / 21,000 (95%)	$1,072,304

== Live Concert Music DVD ==
=== Chart performance ===
Chart	Peak position
Ireland	1
UK Music Videos	14
UK Music Videos	3
UK DVD Videos (OCC)	19
UK Videos (OCC)	19

=== Certifications ===
Region	Certification	Certified units/sales
United Kingdom (BPI)	2× Platinum	100,000^{*}
^{*} Sales figures based on certification alone.

== Personnel ==
- Management: Louis Walsh Management Company
- Director: Brett Turnbull
- Producer: Robin Wilson
- Support Act: Zoo
