= Back Home Tour =

2008 concert tour by Westlife

- Tour by Westlife
- Promotional poster for tour
- Location: Ireland; New Zealand; UK
- Associated album: Back Home
- Start date: 25 February 2008
- End date: 29 June 2008
- Legs: 2
- No. of shows: 45

Westlife concert chronology
- The Love Tour (2007); Back Home Tour (2008); Where We Are Tour (2010)

The Back Home Tour is a world tour by Irish boyband, Westlife in support of their ninth studio album, Back Home. The band toured the United Kingdom, Ireland and New Zealand.

The first leg kicked off in Belfast on 25 February and ended in London on 29 March 2008. The second leg started on a four-day visit to Australia for the promotion of the album and ended on 28 June 2008 at the Plymouth Argyle Football Club in England.

A DVD for the tour was filmed at Croke Park, Dublin on 1 June 2008.

== Support acts ==
- The MacDonald Brothers (Europe—Leg 1, select dates)
- Annabel Fay (Australasia)
- Hope (London)
- Shayne Ward (Dublin)

== Setlist ==
Westlife performing on tour

1. "Hit You with the Real Thing"
2. "World of Our Own"
3. "Something Right"
4. "What Makes a Man"
5. "Uptown Girl" (with Acapella Intro)
6. "The Easy Way" (contains excerpts from "ABC")
7. "If I Let You Go" (contains excerpts from "Where Is the Love?")
8. "Mandy"
9. Medley:
  1. "SexyBack"
  2. "Blame It on the Boogie"
  3. "Get Down on It"
  4. "I'm Your Man"
  5. "Let Me Entertain You"
10. "I'm Already There"
11. Medley:
  1. "Unbreakable"
  2. "Queen of My Heart"
  3. "Fool Again"
12. "Catch My Breath"
13. "Home"
14. "Us Against The World"
15. "Swear It Again"
16. "Flying Without Wings"

Encore

17. "When You're Looking Like That"
18. "You Raise Me Up" (contains elements of "My Heart Will Go On")

Notes:

- My Love was performed on the 25 February in Belfast/

== Tour dates ==
Date	City	Country	Venue
Europe
25 February 2008	Belfast	Northern Ireland	Odyssey Arena
26 February 2008	Belfast	Northern Ireland	Odyssey Arena
27 February 2008	Belfast	Northern Ireland	Odyssey Arena
29 February 2008	Liverpool	England	Echo Arena Liverpool
1 March 2008	London	England	The O_{2}
2 March 2008	London	England	The O_{2}
4 March 2008	Newcastle	England	Metro Radio Arena
5 March 2008	Newcastle	England	Metro Radio Arena
8 March 2008	Cardiff	Wales	Cardiff International Arena
9 March 2008	Cardiff	Wales	Cardiff International Arena
10 March 2008	Cardiff	Wales	Cardiff International Arena
12 March 2008	Birmingham	England	NEC Arena
13 March 2008	Birmingham	England	NEC Arena
15 March 2008	Manchester	England	Manchester Evening News Arena
16 March 2008	Manchester	England	Manchester Evening News Arena
18 March 2008	Glasgow	Scotland	Scottish Exhibition and Conference Centre
20 March 2008	Glasgow	Scotland	Scottish Exhibition and Conference Centre
21 March 2008	Glasgow	Scotland	Scottish Exhibition and Conference Centre
22 March 2008	Glasgow	Scotland	Scottish Exhibition and Conference Centre
24 March 2008	Nottingham	England	Nottingham Arena
25 March 2008	Sheffield	England	Sheffield Arena
26 March 2008	Sheffield	England	Sheffield Arena
28 March 2008	London	England	Wembley Arena
29 March 2008	London	England	Wembley Arena
Australasia
7 May 2008	Christchurch	New Zealand	Westpac Arena
9 May 2008	Wellington	New Zealand	TSB Bank Arena
10 May 2008	Auckland	New Zealand	Vector Arena
12 May 2008	Auckland	New Zealand	ASB Auditorium
13 May 2008	New Plymouth	New Zealand	TSB Stadium
Europe
16 May 2008	Aberdeen	Scotland	Press & Journal Arena
17 May 2008	Glasgow	Scotland	Scottish Exhibition and Conference Centre
25 May 2008	Sheffield	England	Sheffield Arena
27 May 2008	Belfast	Northern Ireland	Odyssey Arena
28 May 2008	Belfast	Northern Ireland	Odyssey Arena
1 June 2008	Dublin	Ireland	Croke Park
3 June 2008	Birmingham	England	NEC Arena
4 June 2008	Manchester	England	Manchester Evening News Arena
21 June 2008	Galway	Ireland	Pearse Stadium
22 June 2008	Killarney	Ireland	Fitzgerald Stadium
24 June 2008	Nottingham	England	Nottingham Arena
25 June 2008	Cardiff	Wales	Cardiff International Arena
28 June 2008	Plymouth	England	Home Park
29 June 2008^{[A]}	Liverpool	England	Echo Arena Liverpool

Festivals and other miscellaneous performances
^{A} This concert was a part of the "Liverpool Summer Pops"

Cancellations and rescheduled shows

19 May 2008	Nottingham, England	Nottingham Arena	Postponed. Rescheduled to 24 June 2008
20 May 2008	Cardiff, Wales	Cardiff International Arena	Postponed. Rescheduled to 25 June 2008
22 May 2008	Birmingham, England	National Exhibition Centre	Postponed. Rescheduled to 3 June 2008
23 May 2008	Manchester, England	Manchester Evening News Arena	Postponed. Rescheduled to 4 June 2008
25 May 2008	Herning, Denmark	MCH Hall M	Cancelled
26 May 2008	Oslo, Norway	Oslo Spektrum	Cancelled
28 May 2008	Oberhausen, Germany	König Pilsener Arena	Cancelled
29 May 2008	Rotterdam, Netherlands	Rotterdam Ahoy	Cancelled

=== Box office score data ===
Venue	City	Tickets sold / available	Gross revenue
Odyssey Arena	Belfast	39,804 / 39,804 (100%)	$2,737,474
Croke Park	Dublin	82,300 / 82,300 (100%)	
Spark Arena	Auckland	10,411	$867,779

== Live Concert DVD ==
10 Years of Westlife – Live at Croke Park Stadium

Video by Westlife
- Released: 24 November 2008
- Recorded: 1 June 2008 (Dublin)
- Genre: Pop
- Label: Sony BMG
- Director: Julie Knowles/ Charlie Lightening

Westlife chronology
Back Home	10 Years of Westlife – Live at Croke Park Stadium

=== Track listing ===
	Title	Time Run
01	Introduction Music/Hit You with the Real Thing	04:45
02	World of Our Own	03:51
03	Something Right	05:05
04	What Makes A Man	04:11
05	Uptown Girl	03:23
06	The Easy Way	03:29
07	If I Let You Go	03:39
08	Mandy	03:44
09	Sexyback/Blame It on the Boogie	03:49
10	Get Down on It	01:55
11	I'm Your Man	02:46
12	Let Me Entertain You	03:06
13	I'm Already There	06:38
14	Unbreakable	02:13
15	Queen of My Heart	02:05
16	Fool Again	01:22
17	Catch My Breath	05:59
18	Home	03:37
19	Us Against The World	06:15
20	Swear It Again	11:59
21	Flying Without Wings	11:03
22	When You're Looking Like That	05:07
23	My Heart Will Go On/You Raise Me Up	06:57
24	End Credits	01:27
25	The Road Home Documentary	30:12
26	Us Against the World	03:57
27	Flying Without Wings	03:44
28	When You're Looking Like That	03:59
29	Bop Bop Baby	04:28
30	Obvious	03:38
31	Unbreakable	04:32
32	You Raise Me Up	04:00
33	World of Our Own	03:31
34	What Makes A Man	03:43
35	I Lay My Love on You	03:29

=== Chart performance ===
Chart	Peak position
Hong Kong	1
Ireland	1
Japan	169
Netherlands	14
New Zealand	1
South Africa	1
Sweden	10
UK Music Videos	1
UK Videos (OCC)	21
UK DVD Videos (OCC)	21

=== Certifications and sales ===
Region	Certification	Certified units/sales
United Kingdom (BPI)	2× Platinum	100,000^{^}
Ireland (IRMA)	6× Platinum	24,000^{^}
^{^} Shipments figures based on certification alone.

=== Release history ===
Region	Date	Label	Catalogue No.
Australia	22 November 2008	Sony BMG	88697389499
Czech Republic	24 November 2008	Sony BMG	
Denmark	25 November 2008	Sony BMG	
Germany	21 November 2008	Sony BMG	88697389499
Hong Kong	24 November 2008	Sony BMG	88697391949
Ireland	22 November 2008	Syco, RCA	
Japan	12 December 2008	Sony BMG	
Norway	26 November 2008	Sony BMG	88697389499
Philippines	24 November 2008	Sony BMG	88697391949
Slovakia	24 November 2008	Sony BMG	
South Africa	21 November 2008	Sony BMG	88697389499
Sweden	26 November 2008	Sony BMG	88697389499
Switzerland	21 November 2008	Sony BMG	88697389499
United Kingdom	24 November 2008	Syco, RCA	88697389499
