= Greatest Hits Tour (Westlife) =

2012 concert tour by Westlife

Greatest Hits (Farewell) Tour
- Tour by Westlife
- Promotional poster for tour
- Location: Asia; Ireland; UK
- Associated album: Greatest Hits
- Start date: 22 February 2012
- End date: 23 June 2012
- Legs: 2
- No. of shows: 33 in Europe; 8 in Asia; 41 Total
- Box office: €27 million (US $35.2 million)

Westlife concert chronology
- Gravity Tour (2011); Greatest Hits (Farewell) Tour (2012); Twenty Tour (2019)

The Greatest Hits Tour (also known as The Farewell Tour) was the twelfth concert tour by Irish boy band, Westlife. The tour, visited the Europe and Asia and supported the group's compilation album, Greatest Hits. After the tour finished, the group disbanded after performing for 14 years until their reformation in 2018.

The last show, on 23 June 2012 was aired live via satellite from Croke Park, Dublin to cinemas all across Europe, Ireland, Belgium, the Czech Republic, South Africa, Estonia, Indonesia and Denmark. Delayed screenings will be shown in cinemas in Indonesia, Australia, and South Africa in July and August 2012. The encore was also shown again in select cinemas across UK on 26 June 2012. The band was the 34th top-grossing tour act of the year and 12th in the midyear list with earnings of $35.2 million (€27 million). The farewell tour consisted of 8 dates in China and 33 in the UK and Ireland culminating in 2 nights at Croke Park in June. In total the band sold 489,694 tickets at an average price of $71.85 (€55) each. The final nights at the said stadium were officially the 11th largest attendance at an outdoor stadium worldwide.

They released a DVD in 2012 from the tour which went to number 1 in the UK and Irish charts, staying for 30 weeks in the charts. BBC later produced a live album from this tour titled "The Farewell Tour: Live in Croke Park" which was released in 2014.

== Background ==
In October 2011, the group revealed plans for the release of a compilation album, spanning their entire career. Many media outlets speculated the band would tour the album. An official announcement was made on 18 October 2011, a mere week after ending their previous tour in Southeast Asia. On the statement released on the group's website, it reported they would perform all 14 of their number one hits along with other favourites. After announcing the tour, tabloids rumoured the band would break-up after their tour was done. On 20 October 2011, the members of the band made an official announcement of their disbanding.

== Opening acts ==
- Lilygreen & Maguire (Europe, select dates)
- Glenn Cal (Europe, select dates)
- Vanquish (Europe, select dates)
- Wy Mac (Wynona Leigh McCullough) "Wy Mac". (Belfast, select dates)
- Jedward (Dublin)
- The Wanted (Dublin)
- Lawson (Dublin)

== Set list ==
Asia
1. "When You're Looking Like That"
2. "World of Our Own"
3. "What Makes a Man"
4. "Safe"
5. "Home"
6. "My Love"
7. "Beautiful Tonight"
8. "Beautiful World"
9. "Lighthouse"
10. "If I Let You Go"
11. "Queen of My Heart"
12. "Seasons in the Sun"
13. "You Raise Me Up"
14. "I'm Already There"
15. "I Will Reach You"
16. "Flying Without Wings"

Encore

17. "What About Now"
18. "Uptown Girl"
Europe
1. "What About Now"
2. "What Makes a Man"
3. "My Love"
4. "Safe"
5. "Uptown Girl"
6. "If I Let You Go"
7. "Queen of My Heart"
8. "Ain't That A Kick In The Head?"
9. Medley: "I Gotta Feeling" / "Party Rock Anthem" / "Sex on Fire" / "Don't Cha" / "Let Me Entertain You" / "Bohemian Rhapsody"
10. "When You're Looking Like That"
11. "Mandy"
12. "Seasons in the Sun"
13. "Swear It Again"
14. "Home"
15. "You Raise Me Up"

Encore

16. "World of Our Own"
17. "Flying Without Wings"

Notes

- "Against All Odds (Take a Look at Me Now)", "I'm Already There", Fool Again", "Unbreakable" and "Bop Bop Baby" were performed at the Motorpoint Arena in Cardiff on 10 May 2012.
- "Seasons in the Sun" was not performed at the final show on 23 June 2012.

== Tour dates ==
Date	City	Country	Venue
Asia
22 February 2012	Beijing	China	MasterCard Center
24 February 2012	Hangzhou	China	Yellow Dragon Gymnasium
25 February 2012	Shanghai	China	Shanghai Indoor Stadium
26 February 2012	Shenzhen	China	Shenzhen Bay Sports Centre
28 February 2012	Wuhan	China	Hongshan Gymnasium
1 March 2012	Chengdu	China	Sichuan Provincial Gymnasium
2 March 2012	Guangzhou	China	Guangzhou Gymnasium
3 March 2012	Hong Kong		VIVA
Europe
10 May 2012	Cardiff	England	Motorpoint Arena
12 May 2012	London	England	The O_{2} Arena
13 May 2012	Sheffield	England	Motorpoint Arena
14 May 2012	Newcastle	England	Metro Radio Arena
15 May 2012	Liverpool	England	Echo Arena
17 May 2012	Cardiff	England	Motorpoint Arena
18 May 2012	Cardiff	England	Motorpoint Arena
19 May 2012	Sheffield	England	Motorpoint Arena
20 May 2012	Birmingham	England	LG Arena
22 May 2012	Nottingham	England	Capital FM Arena
23 May 2012	London	England	The O_{2} Arena
24 May 2012	London	England	The O_{2} Arena
26 May 2012	Manchester	England	Manchester Arena
27 May 2012	Glasgow	England	SECC Concert Hall 4
29 May 2012	Belfast	Northern Ireland	Odyssey Arena
30 May 2012	Belfast	Northern Ireland	Odyssey Arena
1 June 2012	Belfast	Northern Ireland	Odyssey Arena
2 June 2012	Belfast	Northern Ireland	Odyssey Arena
4 June 2012	Birmingham	England	LG Arena
5 June 2012	Nottingham	England	Capital FM Arena
7 June 2012	London	England	The O_{2} Arena
8 June 2012	Birmingham	England	LG Arena
9 June 2012	Manchester	England	Manchester Arena
11 June 2012	Cardiff	England	Motorpoint Arena
12 June 2012	Sheffield	England	Motorpoint Arena
13 June 2012	Liverpool	England	Echo Arena
15 June 2012	Newcastle	England	Metro Radio Arena
16 June 2012	Glasgow	England	SECC Concert Hall 4
17 June 2012	Glasgow	England	SECC Concert Hall 4
19 June 2012	Aberdeen	England	Press & Journal Arena
20 June 2012	Belfast	Ireland	Odyssey Arena
22 June 2012	Dublin	Ireland	Croke Park
23 June 2012	Dublin	Ireland	Croke Park

=== Box office score data ===
Venue	City	Tickets sold / Available	Gross revenue
The O_{2} Arena	London	59,626 / 63,021 (95%)	$3,939,530
Manchester Arena	Manchester	13,960 / 14,435 (97%)	$907,287
Croke Park	Dublin	144,171	$11,908,693

== Personnel ==
=== Vocals ===
- Shane Filan
- Mark Feehily
- Kian Egan
- Nicky Byrne

=== Crew ===
- Simon Ellis - Musical Director

== Live Concert Music DVD ==
=== Chart performance ===
Chart	Peak position
Ireland	1
UK Music Video Albums	1
UK Blu-Ray Albums (OCC)	44
UK DVD Albums (OCC)	14
UK Video Albums (OCC)	16

=== Certifications and sales ===
Region	Certification	Certified units/sales
United Kingdom (BPI)	4× Platinum	200,000^{*}
^{*} Sales figures based on certification alone.
