= The Love Tour =

2007 concert tour by Westlife

- Tour by Westlife
- Location: Australia; Ireland; South Africa; UK
- Associated album: The Love Album
- Start date: 21 February 2007
- End date: 3 May 2007
- No. of shows: 48

Westlife concert chronology
- Face to Face Tour (2006); The Love Tour (2007); Back Home Tour (2008)

The Love Tour was a tour by the Irish band Westlife seen by 390,000 fans. The tour started in Australia, and covered Africa and UK in 2007. The tour had a subtotal of £1,031,033 gross secondary ticket sales.

== Support acts ==
- Code 5
- Cushh
- Dyyce
- Lady Nada
- The MacDonald Brothers
- The Unconventionals

== Setlist ==
Australia/Africa
1. "Total Eclipse of the Heart"
2. "If I Let You Go"
3. "When You're Looking Like That"
4. "Mandy"
5. Medley:
  1. "Everybody (Backstreet's Back)"
  2. "You Got It (The Right Stuff)"
  3. "Picture of You"
  4. "Everything Changes"
  5. "Uptown Girl" (contains excerpts from "When Will I Be Famous?")
6. "You Are So Beautiful"
7. "Easy"
8. "Love Can Build a Bridge"
9. "What Makes a Man"
10. "Amazing"
11. "Unbreakable"
12. "You Raise Me Up"

Encore

13. "World of Our Own"
14. "Flying Without Wings"
15. "The Rose"
Europe
1. "Total Eclipse of the Heart"
2. "When You're Looking Like That"
3. "If I Let You Go"
4. "Mandy"
5. "You Are So Beautiful"
6. "What Makes a Man"
7. "Love Takes Two"
8. "My Love"
9. Medley:
  1. "Everybody (Backstreet's Back)"
  2. "You Got It (The Right Stuff)"
  3. "Picture of You"
  4. "Everything Changes"
  5. "Uptown Girl" (contains excerpts from "When Will I Be Famous?")
10. "Unbreakable"
11. "Fool Again"
12. "You Raise Me Up"
13. "World of Our Own"

Encore

14. "Flying Without Wings"
15. "The Rose"

== Tour dates ==
Date	City	Country	Venue
Australia
21 February 2007	Perth	Australia	Challenge Stadium
23 February 2007	Adelaide	Australia	Adelaide Entertainment Centre
26 February 2007	Melbourne	Australia	Vodafone Arena
27 February 2007	Sydney	Australia	Acer Arena
28 February 2007	Brisbane	Australia	Brisbane Entertainment Centre
Africa
3 March 2007	North West Province	South Africa	Sun City Super Bowl
4 March 2007	Johannesburg	South Africa	Helderfontein Estate
6 March 2007	Port Elizabeth	South Africa	EPRU Stadium
7 March 2007	Bloemfontein	South Africa	Goodyear Park
8 March 2007	Durban	South Africa	Westridge Park Tennis Stadium
9 March 2007^{[A]}	Cape Town	South Africa	River Club Golf and Conference Centre
Europe
12 March 2007	Nottingham	England	Nottingham Arena
13 March 2007	Sheffield	England	Hallam FM Arena
14 March 2007	Sheffield	England	Hallam FM Arena
16 March 2007	Manchester	England	Manchester Evening News Arena
17 March 2007	Manchester	England	Manchester Evening News Arena
19 March 2007	Cardiff	Wales	Cardiff International Arena
20 March 2007	Cardiff	Wales	Cardiff International Arena
21 March 2007	Cardiff	Wales	Cardiff International Arena
23 March 2007	Birmingham	England	NEC Arena
24 March 2007	Birmingham	England	NEC Arena
25 March 2007	Bournemouth	England	Windsor Hall
26 March 2007	Bournemouth	England	Windsor Hall
28 March 2007	Brighton	England	Brighton Centre
29 March 2007	Brighton	England	Brighton Centre
31 March 2007	London	England	Wembley Arena
1 April 2007	London	England	Wembley Arena
3 April 2007	Newcastle	England	Metro Radio Arena
4 April 2007	Newcastle	England	Metro Radio Arena
6 April 2007	Glasgow	Scotland	SECC Concert Hall 4
7 April 2007	Glasgow	Scotland	SECC Concert Hall 4
8 April 2007	Glasgow	Scotland	SECC Concert Hall 4
10 April 2007	Aberdeen	Scotland	Press and Journal Arena
11 April 2007	Aberdeen	Scotland	Press and Journal Arena
13 April 2007	Belfast	Northern Ireland	Odyssey Arena
14 April 2007	Belfast	Northern Ireland	Odyssey Arena
15 April 2007	Belfast	Northern Ireland	Odyssey Arena
16 April 2007	Belfast	Northern Ireland	Odyssey Arena
19 April 2007	Dublin	Ireland	Point Theatre
20 April 2007	Dublin	Ireland	Point Theatre
21 April 2007	Dublin	Ireland	Point Theatre
23 April 2007	Dublin	Ireland	Point Theatre
24 April 2007	Dublin	Ireland	Point Theatre
26 April 2007	Dublin	Ireland	Point Theatre
27 April 2007	Dublin	Ireland	Point Theatre
28 April 2007	Dublin	Ireland	Point Theatre
2 May 2007	Dublin	Ireland	Point Theatre
3 May 2007	Dublin	Ireland	Point Theatre

Festivals and other miscellaneous performances
^{A} This concert was a part of "94.5 Kfm's Night of the Superstars"

Cancellations and rescheduled shows

2 March 2007	Manzini, Swaziland	Mavuso Sports Centre	Cancelled
