= Where We Are Tour =

Where We Are Tour may refer to:

- Where We Are Tour (Westlife), a 2010 tour by Westlife
  - The Where We Are Tour: Live from The O2
- Where We Are Tour (One Direction), a 2014 tour by One Direction
