= Where We Are Tour (Westlife) =

2010 concert tour by Westlife

- Tour by Westlife
- Promotional poster for tour
- Location: Ireland; UK
- Associated album: Where We Are
- Start date: 2 May 2010
- End date: 28 August 2010
- Legs: 1
- No. of shows: 36 Total

Westlife concert chronology
- Back Home Tour (2008); Where We Are Tour (2010); Gravity Tour (2011)

Professional ratings
Review scores
| Source | Rating |
|---|---|
| The Times | 3/5 stars |
| This Is Bristol | 9/10 |

The Where We Are Tour is a tour by Irish pop band, Westlife in support of their ninth studio album, Where We Are. The band toured in numerous counties in the United Kingdom and Ireland, Faroe Islands, Scotland and Wales. The 14 May date of the tour, which took place on The O2 Arena, London, had a live broadcast on Sky Box Office. It was also taped for a concert DVD, The Where We Are Tour: Live from The O2, which was released on 29 November 2010. This was the third hottest tour of May 2010 according to Billboard.

== Background ==
Before the album was released, different reports had been publicized, such as Westlife already having their 2010 tour with two dates in Croke Park on their minds. The tour was designed by Baz Halpin and produced by William Baker as said from an article with the content and design used for the tour. On 28 May, it was announced that Westlife would play an intimate and exclusive gig called "A night with Westlife" at The O2 in Dublin, the gig will be filmed and streamed live via The O2's blueroom website o2blueroom.i.e. The event took place on 20 August with a shorter and different setlist. The tour has been tagged by Stereoboard UK as the fourth most in-demand tour of 2010. The tour was seen by 360,000 fans.

== Support acts ==
Irish girlband Wonderland was announced as one of the support act for Westlife and were the only to serve the full tour. On 27 April 2010, it was announced that American boyband WOW also served as an opening act for this tour, from 12 May in London's O2 up to 5 June in Dublin's Croke Park. On 16 May 2010, boyband The MacDonald Brothers was added as a support act exclusively for the Glasgow dates. JLS, runners up of The X Factor in 2008, alongside Jedward another X Factor contender. will support the band's return at Europe's fourth biggest stadium, Croke Park on 5 June 2010, which gives Westlife a total of four support acts for their Croke Park gig – Wonderland, Wow, JLS and Jedward. Indie rock group The Fuel will support the band on their Bristol date. McLean also supports the band on 18 July, Tamworth Festival.

== Setlist ==
1. "Where We Are"
2. "What About Now"
3. "When You're Looking Like That"
4. "My Love"
5. "Uptown Girl"
6. "Swear It Again" (with acapella intro)
7. "Mandy"
8. "If I Let You Go" (contains excerpts from "All Out of Love")
9. "Shadows"
10. "Home"
11. "I'm Already There"
12. Medley:
  1. "I Gotta Feeling"
  2. "Halo" / "How to Break a Heart"
  3. "The Boys Are Back in Town"
  4. "Sex on Fire"
13. "What Makes a Man"
14. "Flying Without Wings"
15. "World of Our Own"
16. "I'll See You Again"
17. "You Raise Me Up"

Notes

- "Reach Out" and "Unbreakable" were performed at the Odyssey Arena on 2 May 2010.

== Tour dates ==
| Date | City | Country | Venue | Support Act |
|---|---|---|---|---|
Europe
| 2 May 2010 | Belfast | Northern Ireland | Odyssey Arena | Wonderland |
| 3 May 2010 | Belfast | Northern Ireland | Odyssey Arena | Wonderland |
| 4 May 2010 | Belfast | Northern Ireland | Odyssey Arena | Wonderland |
| 6 May 2010 | Nottingham | England | Trent FM Arena Nottingham | Wonderland |
| 7 May 2010 | Liverpool | England | Echo Arena Liverpool | Wonderland |
| 9 May 2010 | Sheffield | England | Sheffield Arena | Wonderland |
| 10 May 2010 | Sheffield | England | Sheffield Arena | Wonderland |
| 12 May 2010 | London | England | The O_{2} Arena | WOW, Wonderland |
| 13 May 2010 | London | England | The O_{2} Arena | WOW, Wonderland |
| 14 May 2010 | London | England | The O_{2} Arena | WOW, Wonderland |
| 16 May 2010 | Birmingham | England | LG Arena | WOW, Wonderland |
| 17 May 2010 | Birmingham | England | LG Arena | WOW, Wonderland |
| 20 May 2010 | Cardiff | Wales | Cardiff International Arena | WOW, Wonderland |
| 21 May 2010 | Cardiff | Wales | Cardiff International Arena | WOW, Wonderland |
| 22 May 2010 | Cardiff | Wales | Cardiff International Arena | WOW, Wonderland |
| 24 May 2010 | Glasgow | Scotland | Scottish Exhibition and Conference Centre | The MacDonald Brothers, Wonderland |
| 25 May 2010 | Glasgow | Scotland | Scottish Exhibition and Conference Centre | The MacDonald Brothers, Wonderland |
| 26 May 2010 | Glasgow | Scotland | Scottish Exhibition and Conference Centre | The MacDonald Brothers, Wonderland |
| 28 May 2010 | Manchester | England | Manchester Evening News Arena | WOW, Wonderland |
| 29 May 2010 | Manchester | England | Manchester Evening News Arena | WOW, Wonderland |
| 31 May 2010 | Newcastle | England | Metro Radio Arena | WOW, Wonderland |
| 1 June 2010 | Newcastle | England | Metro Radio Arena | WOW, Wonderland |
| 5 June 2010 | Dublin | Ireland | Croke Park | Wonderland, WOW, JLS, Jedward |
| 17 June 2010 | Bristol | England | Ashton Gate Stadium | Wonderland, The Fuel |
| 6 July 2010^{[A]} | Cork | Ireland | The Docklands | |
| 7 July 2010^{[A]} | Cork | Ireland | The Docklands | |
| 18 July 2010^{[B]} | Tamworth | England | Tamworth Castle | |
| 30 July 2010 | County Sligo | Ireland | Lissadell House | |
| 5 August 2010^{[C]} | Esher | England | Sandown Park Racecourse | |
| 7 August 2010^{[D]} | Klaksvík | Faroe Islands | Miðbýur | |
| 13 August 2010^{[F]} | Newmarket | England | Newmarket Racecourse | |
| 14 August 2010^{[G]} | Newbury | England | Newbury Racecourse | |
| 20 August 2010^{[H]} | Dublin | Ireland | The O_{2} | |
| 21 August 2010 | Mansfield | England | Field Mill Stadium | |
| 27 August 2010 | Llandudno | Wales | Venue Cymru Arena | |
| 28 August 2010 | Cawdor | Scotland | Cawdor Castle | |

Festivals and other miscellaneous performances
^{A} These concerts were a part of "Live at the Marquee"
^{B} This concert was a part of the "Midlands Music Festival"
^{C} This concert was a part of the "Sandown Park Music Nights"
^{D} This concert was a part of the "Summarfestivalurin"
^{F} This concert was a part of the "Newmarket Nights"
^{G} This concert was a part of the "Party in Paddock"
^{H} This concert was a part of "A Night in with Westlife"

Cancellations and rescheduled shows

| 28 August 2010 | Bangor, Wales | Vaynol Estate | Cancelled. This concert was a part of the "Faenol Festival" |

=== Box office score data ===
| Venue | City | Tickets sold / available | Gross revenue |
|---|---|---|---|
| Trent FM Arena | Nottingham | 6,889 / 7,291 (94%) | $395,914 |
| Echo Arena | Liverpool | 9,163 / 9,163 (100%) | $522,061 |
| Sheffield Arena | Sheffield | 19,923 / 22,604 (88%) | $1,119,520 |
| O2 Arena | London | 35,261 / 47,808 (74%) | $1,988,780 |
| LG Arena | Birmingham | 21,628 / 24,826 (87%) | $1,194,190 |
| Cardiff International Arena | Cardiff | 13,699 / 14,080 (97%) | $746,189 |
| Scottish Exhibition and Conference Centre | Glasgow | 23,655 / 24,922 (95%) | $1,300,950 |
| Manchester Evening Arena | Manchester | 22,580 / 28,002 (80%) | $1,245,320 |
| Metro Radio Arena | Newcastle | 8,630 / 9,043 (96%) | $473,542 |
| Croke Park | Dublin | 86,500 / 86,500 (100%) | $5,914,820 |

== Credits ==
- Director: William Baker
- Musical Director/Arrangements: Steve Anderson
- Choreographer: Priscilla Samuels
- Lighting Designer : Baz Halpburn
- DVD Audio Mixed by Toby Alington and Steve Anderson

Band

- Jamie Norton – Keyboards
- Gareth Brown – Drums
- Steve Octave – Bass
- Ben Mark – Guitar

== A Night with Westlife / Westlife Acoustic Show - O2 Dublin ==
As part of their Where We Are Tour, the band did an acoustic performance along with The Irish Film Orchestra and choir on 20 August 2010.

- Musical Director/Arranger – Steve Anderson
- Strings Arranged by Steve Anderson and Cliff Masterson
- Choir Arranged by Sean Gilligan
- Mixed by Andy Knightley

Band

- Vocals – Shane Filan, Mark Feehily, Kian Egan, Nicky Byrne
- Drums – Gareth Brown
- Piano – Jamie Norton
- Bass – Steve Octave
- Guitar – Ben Mark
- Guitar – Luca Campaner
- Guitar – Kian Egan
- Percussion – Robert 'Skins' Anderson
- Strings – The Irish Film Orchestra
- Choir – The Hallelujah Choir
