= Turnaround Tour =

2004 concert tour by Westlife

- Tour by Westlife
- Location: Europe
- Associated album: Turnaround
- Start date: 29 March 2004
- End date: 2 August 2004
- No. of shows: 63

Westlife concert chronology
- Unbreakable Tour (2003); Turnaround Tour (2004); No. 1's Tour (2005)

The Turnaround Tour was the fourth concert tour by Irish pop band Westlife. The tour covered the UK and Europe in 2004 seen by 490,000 fans making £12,000,000, the tour was also supposed to appear in China, Korea, Hong Kong, Malaysia, Thailand, Philippines and Singapore; however, it was cancelled. Member Brian McFadden left the group on 9 March 2004, just three weeks before the first date of this tour in Belfast.

== Support acts ==
- Zoo
- Bellefire (select dates)
- The Conway Sisters (select dates)
- Kwest (select dates)
- Mark Dakriet (select dates)
- No Way Out (select dates)
- Pop! (select dates)
- Sub Bass 5 (select dates)
- Traphic (select dates)
- Twen2y4se7en (select dates)

== Setlist ==
1. ” Turn Around"
2. "My Girl"
3. "What Makes a Man"
4. "World of Our Own"
5. "Flying Without Wings"
6. "Swear It Again"
7. "Uptown Girl"
8. Medley:
  1. "Help!"
  2. "I'll Be There For You"
  3. "Wake Me Up Before You Go-Go"
  4. "That's the Way (I Like It)"
  5. "Everybody Needs Somebody to Love"
9. "When You're Looking Like That"
10. "Tonight"
11. "On My Shoulder"
12. "Obvious"

Encore

13. "Hey Whatever"
14. "My Love"
15. "Mandy"

Notes

- For concerts in Belfast, the group performed "Lost in You"

== Tour dates ==
Date	City	Country	Venue
Europe—Leg 1
29 March 2004	Belfast	Northern Ireland	Odyssey Arena
30 March 2004	Belfast	Northern Ireland	Odyssey Arena
31 March 2004	Belfast	Northern Ireland	Odyssey Arena
2 April 2004	Belfast	Northern Ireland	Odyssey Arena
3 April 2004	Belfast	Northern Ireland	Odyssey Arena
4 April 2004	Belfast	Northern Ireland	Odyssey Arena
6 April 2004	Nottingham	England	Nottingham Arena
7 April 2004	Nottingham	England	Nottingham Arena
12 April 2004	Cardiff	Wales	Cardiff International Arena
13 April 2004	Cardiff	Wales	Cardiff International Arena
14 April 2004	Cardiff	Wales	Cardiff International Arena
16 April 2004	Glasgow	Scotland	Scottish Exhibition and Conference Centre
17 April 2004	Glasgow	Scotland	Scottish Exhibition and Conference Centre
18 April 2004	Glasgow	Scotland	Scottish Exhibition and Conference Centre
20 April 2004	Glasgow	Scotland	Scottish Exhibition and Conference Centre
21 April 2004	Glasgow	Scotland	Scottish Exhibition and Conference Centre
22 April 2004	Glasgow	Scotland	Scottish Exhibition and Conference Centre
23 April 2004	Newcastle	England	Metro Radio Arena
25 April 2004	Newcastle	England	Metro Radio Arena
26 April 2004	Newcastle	England	Metro Radio Arena
27 April 2004	Birmingham	England	NEC Arena
29 April 2004	Sheffield	England	Hallam FM Arena
30 April 2004	Sheffield	England	Hallam FM Arena
1 May 2004	Sheffield	England	Hallam FM Arena
3 May 2004	Manchester	England	Manchester Evening News Arena
4 May 2004	Manchester	England	Manchester Evening News Arena
5 May 2004	Manchester	England	Manchester Evening News Arena
7 May 2004	London	England	Wembley Arena
8 May 2004	London	England	Wembley Arena
9 May 2004	London	England	Wembley Arena
11 May 2004	Dublin	Ireland	Point Theatre
12 May 2004	Dublin	Ireland	Point Theatre
13 May 2004	Dublin	Ireland	Point Theatre
15 May 2004	Dublin	Ireland	Point Theatre
16 May 2004	Dublin	Ireland	Point Theatre
18 May 2004	Dublin	Ireland	Point Theatre
19 May 2004	Dublin	Ireland	Point Theatre
20 May 2004	Dublin	Ireland	Point Theatre
21 May 2004	Dublin	Ireland	Point Theatre
23 May 2004	Birmingham	England	NEC Arena
24 May 2004	Birmingham	England	NEC Arena
25 May 2004	Birmingham	England	NEC Arena
28 May 2004	Gothenburg	Sweden	Scandinavium
29 May 2004	Stockholm	Sweden	Stockholm Globe Arena
30 May 2004	Oslo	Norway	Oslo Spektrum
1 June 2004	Copenhagen	Denmark	Forum Copenhagen
2 June 2004	Hamburg	Germany	Stadtpark Freilichtbühne
3 June 2004	Oberhausen	Germany	König Pilsener Arena
4 June 2004	Amsterdam	Netherlands	Heineken Music Hall
5 June 2004	Amsterdam	Netherlands	Heineken Music Hall
6 June 2004	Belfast	Northern Ireland	Odyssey Arena
7 June 2004	Belfast	Northern Ireland	Odyssey Arena
9 June 2004	Birmingham	England	National Indoor Arena
11 June 2004	Cardiff	Wales	Cardiff International Arena
13 June 2004	Brighton	England	Brighton Centre
14 June 2004	Brighton	England	Brighton Centre
Europe—Leg 2
24 July 2004	Edinburgh	Scotland	Edinburgh Castle Esplanade
25 July 2004	Broadstairs	England	St Georges Church of England School
27 July 2004^{[A]}	Liverpool	England	King's Dock
28 July 2004^{[A]}	Liverpool	England	King's Dock
31 July 2004	Ipswich	England	Chantry Park
1 August 2004	Romsey	England	Broadlands
2 August 2004	Exeter	England	Powderham Castle

Festivals and other miscellaneous performances
^{A} These concerts were a part of the "Liverpool Summer Pops"

Cancellations and rescheduled shows

9 April 2004	Brighton, England	Brighton Centre	Rescheduled for 13 June 2004
10 April 2004	Brighton, England	Brighton Centre	Rescheduled for 14 June 2004
18 June 2004	Beijing, China	Capital Indoor Stadium	Cancelled
20 June 2004	Shanghai, China	Shanghai Indoor Stadium	Cancelled
22 June 2004	Guangzhou, China	Guangzhou Gymnasium	Cancelled
24 June 2004	Hong Kong, China	Hong Kong Coliseum	Cancelled
26 June 2004	Kuala Lumpur, Malaysia	Putra Indoor Stadium	Cancelled
1 July 2004	Bangkok, Thailand	Impact Arena	Cancelled
3 July 2004	Quezon City, Philippines	Araneta Coliseum	Cancelled
5 July 2004	Kallang, Singapore	Singapore Indoor Stadium	Cancelled

=== Box office score data ===
Venue	City	Tickets sold / available	Gross revenue
Scottish Exhibition and Conference Centre	Glasgow	52,218 / 53,892 (96%)	$2,534,664
Wembley Arena	London	40,126 / 42,000 (95%)	$2,094,716
Manchester Evening Arena	Manchester	39,880 / 42,606 (93%)	$1,935,777
National Exhibition Centre	Birmingham	39,488 / 45,594 (86%)	$1,915,749
Sheffield Arena	Sheffield	31,748 / 33,960 (93%)	$1,541,050
Metro Radio Arena	Newcastle	25,408 / 27,600 (92%)	$1,233,306
Cardiff International Arena	Cardiff	18,477 / 18,872 (97%)	$896,875

== Live Concert Music DVD ==
=== Chart performance ===
Chart	Peak position
Ireland	1
Sweden Music Videos	2
UK Music Videos	2
UK DVD Video (OCC)	30
UK Videos (OCC)	37

=== Certifications ===
Region	Certification	Certified units/sales
United Kingdom (BPI)	Platinum	50,000^{*}
^{*} Sales figures based on certification alone.
