= The Where We Are Tour: Live from The O2 =

Video by Westlife
- Released: November 29, 2010
- Recorded: May 14, 2010 (London)
- Genre: Pop
- Label: Sony BMG

Westlife chronology
The Karaoke Collection (2008)	The Where We Are Tour: Live from The O2 (2010)	The Greatest Hits Tour (2012)

The Where We Are Tour: Live from The O2 is a concert DVD by Irish boy band Westlife from their Where We Are Tour.

== Background ==
During the group's Where We Are Tour, it was confirmed that their May 14 concert at the O2 Arena, London, England was recorded. The release date was then set as 29 November 2010 for both DVD and Blu-ray formats, making it the band's first release on Blu-ray. Pre-order links were set up by Play.com on 12 October 2010. The album includes an unseen backstage documentary during said tour and the music video of "What About Now".

According to description released:

‘The Where We Are Tour: Live From The 02’ also gives fans a rare, intimate glimpse into the lives of Nicky Byrne, Kian Egan, Mark Feehily and Shane Filan with the bonus ‘Where We Are – The Documentary’. This compelling behind the scenes documentary provides a fly on the wall insight into the lives of the band in the run up and during the tour. The boys also chat exclusively about why this tour meant so much to them. Both the DVD and Blu-ray versions will also include the epic ‘What About Now’ video. In addition, the Blu-ray will feature a full hour and a half exclusive commentary where the boys discuss the show in detail and talk about what we can expect from the next tour. It is simply essential viewing for any Westlife fan.

== Track listing ==
1. "Where We Are"
2. "What About Now"
3. "When You're Looking Like That"
4. "My Love"
5. "Uptown Girl"
6. "Swear It Again" (with a cappella intro)
7. "Mandy"
8. "If I Let You Go"
9. "Shadows"
10. "Home"
11. "I'm Already There"
12. "I Gotta Feeling"
13. "Halo"/"How to Break a Heart"
14. "The Boys Are Back in Town"
15. "Sex on Fire"
16. "What Makes a Man"
17. "Flying Without Wings"
18. "World of Our Own"
19. "I'll See You Again"
20. "You Raise Me Up"

== Chart performance ==
Chart	Peak position
Ireland	1
UK Music Videos	3
UK Blu-Ray Videos (OCC)	72
UK DVD Videos (OCC)	78
UK Videos (OCC)	74

== Certifications ==
Certifications for Where We Are Tour
Region	Certification	Certified units/sales
Ireland (IRMA)	Platinum	4,000^{^}
United Kingdom (BPI)	Platinum	50,000^{*}
^{*} Sales figures based on certification alone.^{^} Shipments figures based on certification alone.

== Release history ==
Region	Date	Format	Label
Europe	26 November 2010	DVD, Blu-ray	RCA Records, Sony Music, Syco Music
South Africa	29 November 2010	DVD, Blu-ray	RCA Records, Sony Music, Syco Music
United Kingdom	29 November 2010	DVD, Blu-ray	RCA Records, Sony Music, Syco Music
Finland	12 January 2011	DVD, Blu-ray	RCA Records, Sony Music, Syco Music
Malaysia	30 November 2010	DVD, Blu-ray	RCA Records, Sony Music, Syco Music
