= Gravity Tour =

2011 concert tour by Westlife

- Tour by Westlife
- Promotional poster for tour
- Location: Africa; Asia; Ireland; UK
- Associated album: Gravity
- Start date: 7 March 2011
- End date: 10 October 2011
- Legs: 5
- No. of shows: 33 in Europe; 13 in Asia; 2 in Africa; 48 total

Westlife concert chronology
- Where We Are Tour (2010); Gravity Tour (2011); Greatest Hits Tour (2012)

The Gravity Tour is the eleventh concert tour by Irish boy band, Westlife. The tour supported their eleventh studio album, Gravity. The tour visits Europe, Asia and Africa. The tour was listed 55th in 2011 Worldwide First Quarter ticket sales list with 56,793 tickets sold at that time of the year only.

== Background ==
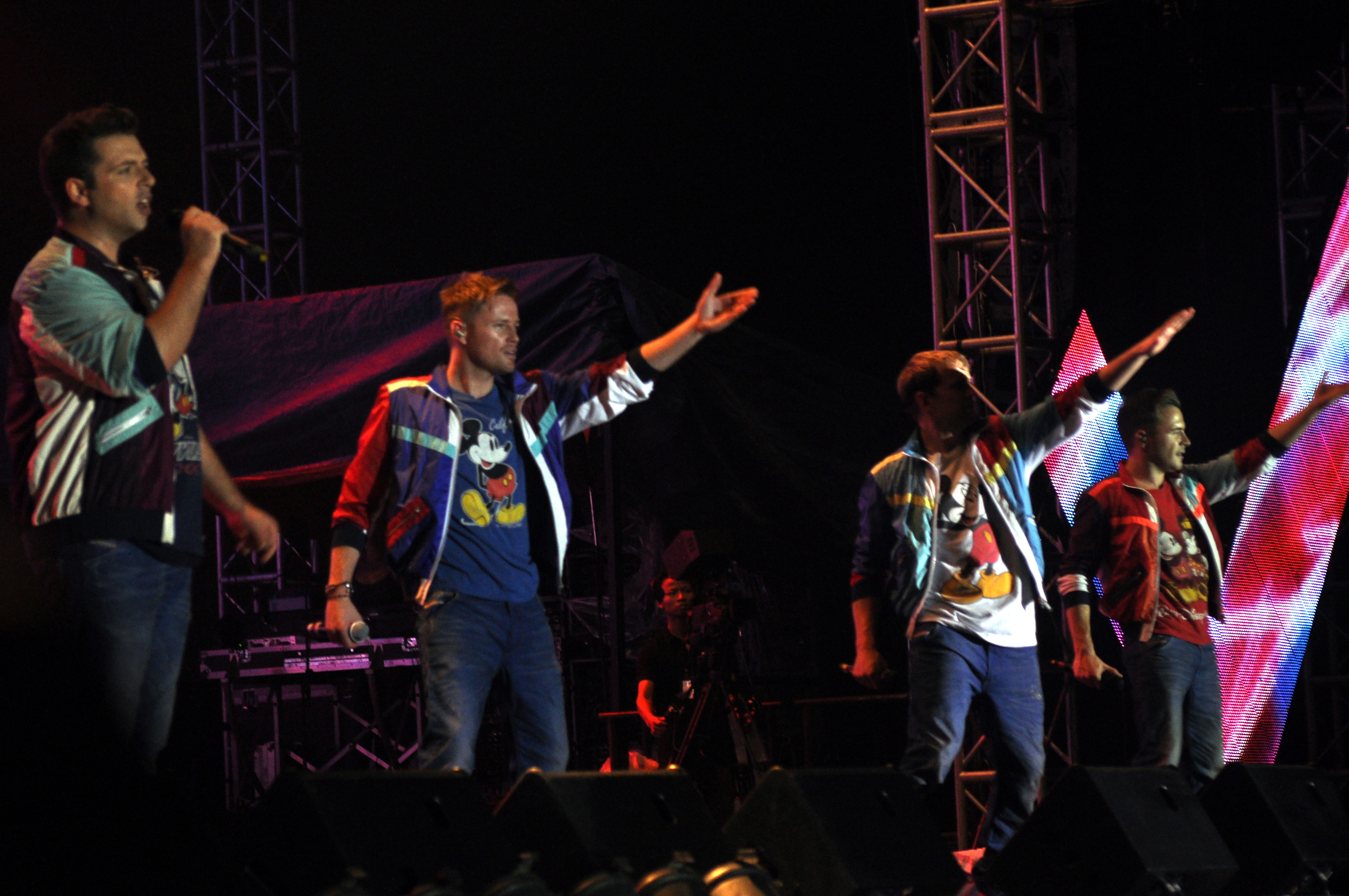
Westlife performing in Vietnam

Official tour logo

The tour was announced a mere two weeks after the group completed their Where We Are Tour. The tour was directed by William Baker.

Originally, tour dates were announced only for the United Kingdom, but dates were added for Ireland, the Arabian Peninsula, and festival shows in Europe. Volkswagen supported this tour.

During the concert at the Echo Arena Liverpool in Liverpool, England, the show was briefly paused as a set malfunction left the group hanging from the arena's ceiling by a swaying bar. A team of security guards helped lower the group, resuming the concert.

== Opening acts ==
- Wonderland (Europe—Leg 1)
- Glenn Cal (Europe—Leg 1)
- Young JV (Philippines)

== Set list ==
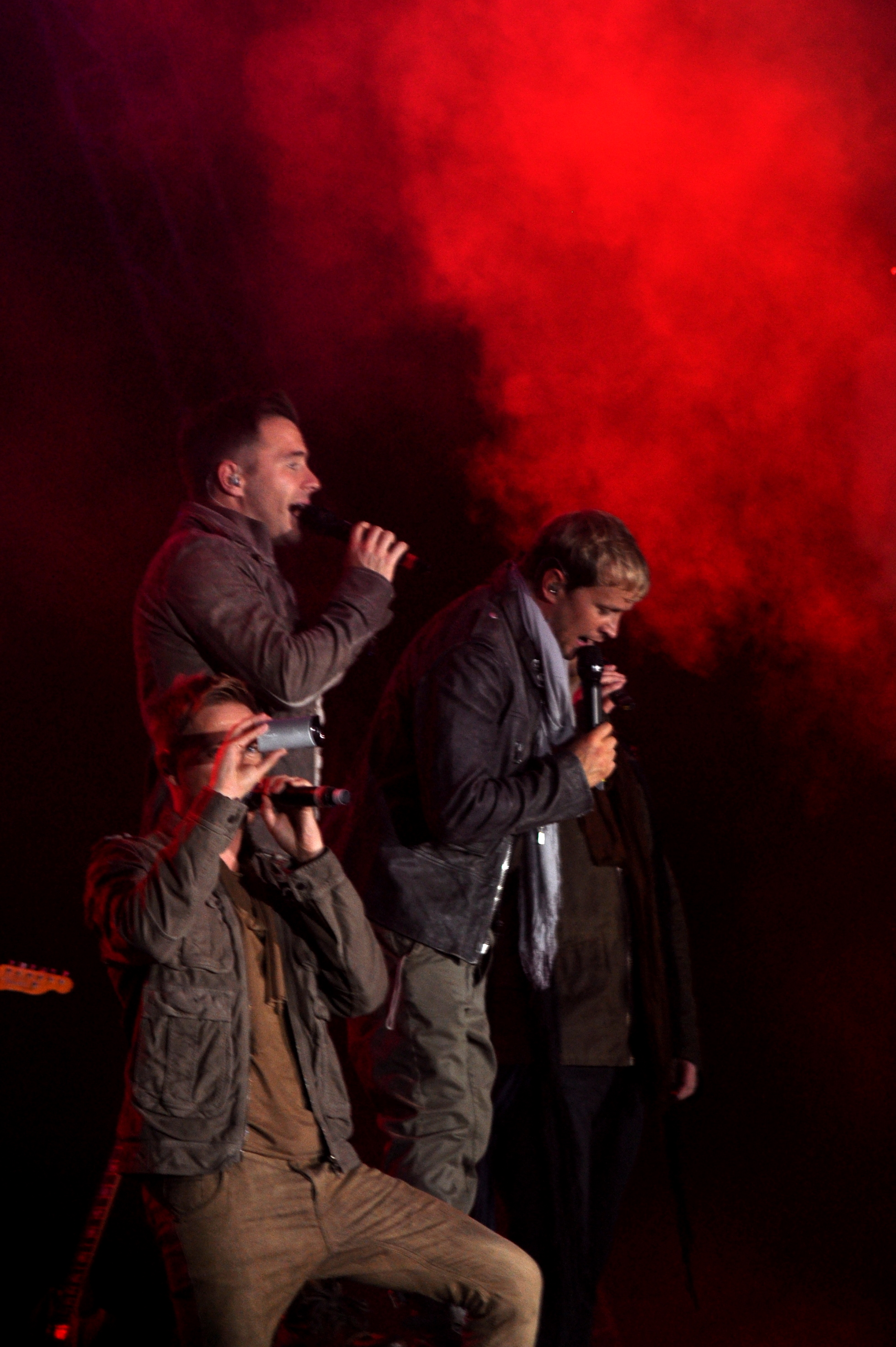
Westlife during their Vietnam tour date in 2011

The following setlist was obtained from the concert held on 18 March 2011, at the Echo Arena in Liverpool, England. It does not represent all concerts for the duration of the tour.

1. "No One's Gonna Sleep Tonight"
2. "When You're Looking Like That"
3. "World of Our Own"
4. "What Makes a Man"
5. "Safe"
6. "Home"
7. "Queen of My Heart"
8. "Beautiful Tonight"
9. "Medley:"
  1. "Viva la Vida"
  2. "Only Girl (In the World)"
  3. "The Time (Dirty Bit)"
  4. "Bad Romance"
  5. "I Predict a Riot"
10. "Seasons in the Sun"
11. "You Raise Me Up"
12. "I'm Already There"
13. "I Will Reach You"
14. "Flying Without Wings"
15. "What About Now"
16. "Uptown Girl"

Notes

1. "No One's Gonna Sleep Tonight" was not performed in the Asian Leg.
2. "My Love" was performed in the Asian Leg.

== Tour dates ==
Date	City	Country	Venue
Europe
7 March 2011	Cardiff	Wales	Motorpoint Arena
8 March 2011	Cardiff	Wales	Motorpoint Arena
9 March 2011	Cardiff	Wales	Motorpoint Arena
11 March 2011	London	England	The O_{2}
12 March 2011	London	England	The O_{2}
14 March 2011	Newcastle	England	Metro Radio Arena
15 March 2011	Newcastle	England	Metro Radio Arena
16 March 2011	Nottingham	England	Capital FM Arena
18 March 2011	Liverpool	England	Echo Arena
19 March 2011	Glasgow	Scotland	SECC Concert Hall 4
20 March 2011	Glasgow	Scotland	SECC Concert Hall 4
22 March 2011	Manchester	England	Manchester Evening News Arena
23 March 2011	Manchester	England	Manchester Evening News Arena
25 March 2011	Birmingham	England	LG Arena
27 March 2011	London	England	Wembley Arena
28 March 2011	Sheffield	England	Motorpoint Arena
29 March 2011	Sheffield	England	Motorpoint Arena
31 March 2011	Birmingham	England	LG Arena
2 April 2011	Dublin	Ireland	The O_{2}
3 April 2011	Dublin	Ireland	The O_{2}
5 April 2011	Belfast	Northern Ireland	Odyssey Arena
6 April 2011	Belfast	Northern Ireland	Odyssey Arena
8 April 2011	Dublin	Ireland	The O_{2}
9 April 2011	Dublin	Ireland	The O_{2}
10 April 2011	Dublin	Ireland	The O_{2}
Asia
13 April 2011	Muscat	Oman	InterContinental Gardens
14 April 2011	Dubai	United Arab Emirates	Jebel Ali Center of Excellence
Europe
10 June 2011^{[A]}	London	England	Base Court at Hampton Court Palace
9 July 2011^{[B]}	Cork	Ireland	The Docklands
15 July 2011^{[C]}	Brandon	England	Thetford Forest
16 July 2011^{[C]}	Tetbury	England	Westonbirt Arboretum
17 July 2011	Hampshire	England	Broadlands Park
23 July 2011	Hamilton	England	Hamilton Park Racecourse
30 July 2011	Doncaster	England	Keepmoat Stadium
10 September 2011^{[D]}	London	England	Hyde Park
Africa
16 September 2011^{[E]}	Windhoek	Namibia	Wanderers Sports Grounds
17 September 2011	Centurion	South Africa	SuperSport Park
Asia
21 September 2011	Shanghai	China	Shanghai Indoor Stadium
23 September 2011	Guangzhou	China	Guangzhou International Sports Arena
25 September 2011	Beijing	China	MasterCard Center
27 September 2011	Hong Kong		VIVA
29 September 2011	Quezon City	Philippines	Smart Araneta Coliseum
1 October 2011	Hanoi	Vietnam	Mỹ Đình National Stadium
3 October 2011	Singapore		Singapore Indoor Stadium
5 October 2011	Jakarta	Indonesia	Tennis Indoor Senayan
7 October 2011	Kuala Lumpur	Malaysia	Putra Indoor Stadium
9 October 2011	Seoul	South Korea	Hwajung Gymnasium
10 October 2011	Taipei	Taiwan	NTU Sports Center

Festivals and other miscellaneous performances
^{A} This concert was a part of the Hampton Court Palace Festival
^{B} This concert was a part of Live at the Marquee
^{C} These concerts were a part of Forestry Commission—Live Music
^{D} This concert was a part of the "BBC Proms in the Park"
^{E} This concert was a part of the "FNB Festival"

Cancellations and rescheduled shows

19 June 2011	Douglas, Isle of Man	Nobles Park	Cancelled. This concert was a part of the Manx Telecom Bay Festival.

=== Box office score data ===
Venue	City	Tickets sold / available	Gross revenue
The O_{2} Arena^{[A]}	London	21,128 / 25,000 (84%)	$1,420,080
Manchester Evening News Arena	Manchester	14,255 / 16,069 (89%)	$938,521
The O_{2}^{[B]}	Dublin	41,124 / 41,124 (100%)	$3,359,670

^{A} This concert ranked seventh in Billboard's "Hot Tours" for March 2011.
^{B} This concert ranked as fifth in the Billboard's "Hot Tours" for June 2011.

== Personnel ==
=== Vocals ===
- Shane Filan
- Mark Feehily
- Kian Egan
- Nicky Byrne

=== Band ===
- Simon Ellis - Keyboards / Musical Director

=== Crew ===
- Simon Ellis - Musical Director
