= Tonight (Westlife song) =

2003 single by Westlife

Single by Westlife

from the album Unbreakable – The Greatest Hits Volume 1
- A-side: "Miss You Nights"
- B-side: "Where We Belong"
- Released: 21 March 2003
- Studio: Rokstone (London, UK)
- Length: 4:34 (single remix); 4:13 (7-inch Metro mix)
- Label: RCA; S; BMG
- Songwriters: Steve Mac; Wayne Hector; Jorgen Elofsson
- Producer: Steve Mac

Westlife singles chronology
"Unbreakable" (2002)	"Tonight" / "Miss You Nights" (2003)	"Hey Whatever" (2003)

Music video
- "Tonight" on YouTube

"Tonight" is a song by Irish boy band Westlife. It was first released as a single in Sweden on 21 March 2003. In the United Kingdom, "Tonight" was issued as a double A-side single with "Miss You Nights" three days later. It served the second and final single from their first compilation album, Unbreakable – The Greatest Hits Volume 1 (2002). The double A-side peaked at No. 1 in Ireland, becoming Westlife's 10th number-one single in their home country. In the UK, the single reached No. 3 on the UK Singles Chart.

== Background and content ==
"Tonight" was written by Steve Mac, Wayne Hector and Jorgen Elofsson. It was composed in the traditional verse–chorus form in B♭ major, with McFadden and Filan vocal ranging from the chords of F_{4} to B_{5}.

== Track listings ==
UK CD1

1. "Tonight" (single remix)
2. "Miss You Nights" (single remix)
3. "Where We Belong"
4. "Tonight" (video)

UK CD2

1. "Tonight" (single remix)
2. "Tonight" (12-inch Metro mix)
3. "Miss You Nights" (video)

European CD single

1. "Tonight" (single remix)
2. "Where We Belong"

European maxi-CD single

1. "Tonight" (single remix)
2. "Tonight" (7-inch Metro mix)
3. "Where We Belong"
4. "Tonight" (video)

Australian CD single

1. "Tonight" (single remix)
2. "Tonight" (Metro mix)
3. "Where We Belong"

== Charts ==
=== Weekly charts ===
Chart (2003)	Peak position
Australia (ARIA)	65
Austria (Ö3 Austria Top 40)	58
Belgium (Ultratip Bubbling Under Flanders)	4
Denmark (Tracklisten)	10
Europe (Eurochart Hot 100)	14
Europe (European Hit Radio)	15
Germany (GfK)	47
Greece (IFPI)	48
Ireland (IRMA)	1
Latvia (Latvijas Top 40)	33
Netherlands (Single Top 100)	55
Poland Airplay (Polish Airplay Charts)	28
Romania (Romanian Top 100)	51
Scottish Singles Sales (Official Charts) with "Miss You Nights"	3
Sweden (Sverigetopplistan)	33
UK Singles (Official Charts) with "Miss You Nights"	3
UK Airplay (Music Week)	13

=== Year-end charts ===
Chart (2003)	Position
Ireland (IRMA)	22
UK Singles (OCC)	61

== Release history ==
Region	Version	Date	Format(s)	Label(s)	Ref.
Sweden	"Tonight"	21 March 2003	CD	RCA; S; BMG	
Denmark	"Tonight"	24 March 2003	CD	RCA; S; BMG	
United Kingdom	"Tonight" / "Miss You Nights"	24 March 2003	CD; cassette	RCA; S; BMG	
Australia	"Tonight"	5 May 2003	CD	RCA; S; BMG	
