= Unbreakable (Westlife song) =

2002 single by Westlife

Single by Westlife

from the album Unbreakable – The Greatest Hits Volume 1
- B-side: "Never Knew I Was Losing You"
- Released: 4 November 2002
- Studio: Rokstone (London, England)
- Length: 4:33
- Label: RCA; BMG; S
- Songwriters: Jörgen Elofsson; John Reid
- Producer: Steve Mac

Westlife singles chronology
"Bop Bop Baby" (2002)	"Unbreakable" (2002)	"Tonight" / "Miss You Nights" (2003)

Music video
- "Unbreakable" on YouTube

"Unbreakable" CD2

"Unbreakable" is a song performed by Irish boy band Westlife, taken from their first greatest hits album, Unbreakable - The Greatest Hits Volume 1 (2002). It was released on 4 November 2002 by RCA Records and Syco Music as the lead single from the album's. The song was written by Jörgen Elofsson and John Reid, and produced by Steve Mac. It was composed in the traditional verse–chorus form in G major, with the group's vocals ranging from the chords of D_{4} to C♯_{6}.

"Unbreakable" became the band's 11th UK number-one single and also reached number one in their native Ireland. The song has received a silver sales certification in the UK for over 200,000 copies sold. It is the band's 13th-best-selling single in paid-for and combined sales in the UK as of January 2019.

== Music video ==
The music video was filmed on the same beach as the video for the song "If I Let You Go" and the band members are standing on a sign that reads UNBREAKABLE. The video begins with a girl crying in a graveyard and then it goes into a flashback, in which it shows her and her boyfriend in a Jeep out for a romantic date on the beach. Later, she dresses herself for appears to be either a wedding or a prom and waits for her boyfriend to arrive. The man is driving to his girlfriend's home in the Jeep as he holds a rose to give to her. But as he drives, he takes his eyes off the road as he puts the rose on the passenger's seat and crashes on his way home, killing him instantly. At the girlfriend's home, there is a knock on the door and, believing it is her boyfriend, she rushes to answer, but finds that it was a police officer, who regretfully takes off his hat as he tells her about the accident and she falls to her knees as she breaks down in tears. The video ends with the girlfriend at her boyfriend's grave, on which she puts the rose as she cries. Parts of the video was shot in Hotel Rosslyn Annex as well.

== Track listings ==
UK CD1

1. "Unbreakable" (single remix)
2. "Never Knew I Was Losing You"
3. "World of Our Own" (US video)
4. Exclusive footage

UK CD2

1. "Unbreakable (single remix)
2. "Evergreen"
3. "World of Our Own" (US mix)
4. Westlife fans roll of honour

UK cassette single

1. "Unbreakable" (single remix)
2. "Never Knew I Was Losing You"

== Credits and personnel ==
Credits are lifted from the Unbreakable – The Greatest Hits Volume 1 album booklet.

Studios

- Engineered at Rokstone Studios (London, England)
- Mastered at 360 Mastering (London, England)

Personnel

- Jörgen Elofsson – writing
- John Reid – writing, additional backing vocals
- Andy Caine – additional backing vocals
- Friðrik "Frizzy" Karlsson – guitars
- Steve Pearce – bass
- Steve Mac – keyboards, production, arrangement, mixing
- Chris Laws – drums, engineering
- Daniel Pursey – percussion, assistant engineering
- Dave Arch – string arrangement
- Matt Howe – engineering
- Robin Sellars – engineering
- Dick Beetham – mastering.

== Charts ==
=== Weekly charts ===
Chart (2002–2003)	Peak position
Austria (Ö3 Austria Top 40)	23
Belgium (Ultratop 50 Flanders)	10
Belgium (Ultratip Bubbling Under Wallonia)	15
Denmark (Tracklisten)	6
Europe (Eurochart Hot 100)	5
Europe (European Hit Radio)	20
Germany (GfK)	12
Ireland (IRMA)	1
Latvia (Latvijas Top 40)	32
Netherlands (Dutch Top 40)	18
Netherlands (Single Top 100)	19
New Zealand (Recorded Music NZ)	44
Nicaragua (Notimex)	2
Norway (VG-lista)	9
Poland Airplay (Polish Airplay Charts)	25
Romania (Romanian Top 100)	12
Scottish Singles Sales (Official Charts)	1
Sweden (Sverigetopplistan)	5
Switzerland (Schweizer Hitparade)	41
UK Singles (Official Charts)	1
UK Airplay (Music Week)	14

=== Year-end charts ===
Chart (2002)	Position
Ireland (IRMA)	24
Sweden (Hitlistan)	67
Taiwan (Hito Radio)	6
UK Singles (OCC)	53

Chart (2003)	Position
Romania (Romanian Top 100)	77

== Certifications ==
Region	Certification	Certified units/sales
United Kingdom (BPI)	Silver	200,000^{^}
^{^} Shipments figures based on certification alone.
