= If I Let You Go =

1999 single by Westlife

- One of European artworks

Single by Westlife

from the album Westlife
- B-side: "Try Again"
- Released: 9 August 1999
- Studio: Cheiron (Stockholm, Sweden)
- Length: 3:40
- Label: RCA; BMG
- Songwriters: Jörgen Elofsson; Per Magnusson; David Kreuger
- Producers: Per Magnusson; David Kreuger

Westlife singles chronology
"Swear It Again" (1999)	"If I Let You Go" (1999)	"Flying Without Wings" (1999)

Music video
- "If I Let You Go" on YouTube

"If I Let You Go" is a song by Irish boy band Westlife. It was released in the United Kingdom on 9 August 1999 as the second single from their self-titled debut album (1999). It became the band's second number-one hit, spending 11 weeks on the UK Singles Chart. The song has received a Platinum sales certification in the UK for selling over 600,000 in combined sales of purchased and streaming-equivalent sales. It is the band's 10th-best-selling single in paid-for sales and combined sales in the UK as of January 2019.

== Composition ==
"If I Let You Go" composed in the traditional verse–chorus form in B♭ major, with Brian McFadden, Shane Filan, and Mark Feehily's vocals ranging from the chords of D_{4} to A_{5}.

== Music video ==
The music video was directed by Sven Harding and was filmed in Tenerife, Spain. It depicts the band walking along a beach and singing by a hillside surrounded by red and yellow flags.

== Track listings ==
UK CD1

1. "If I Let You Go" (radio edit)
2. "Try Again"
3. Enhanced CD

UK CD2

1. "If I Let You Go" (radio edit)
2. "If I Let You Go" (extended version)
3. Interview with Andi Peters

UK cassette single and European CD single

1. "If I Let You Go" (radio edit)
2. "Try Again"

Australian CD single

1. "If I Let You Go" (radio edit) – 3:38
2. "Try Again" – 3:34
3. "If I Let You Go" (extended version) – 6:07
4. Enhanced CD

== Credits and personnel ==
Credits are lifted from the UK CD1 and Westlife liner notes.

Studios

- Recorded at Cheiron Studios (Stockholm, Sweden)
- Strings recorded at Soundtrade Studios (Stockholm, Sweden)
- Mixed at Mono Music Studios (Stockholm, Sweden)

Personnel

- Jörgen Elofsson – writing
- Per Magnusson – writing, keyboards, production, arrangement, programming
- David Kreuger – writing, arrangement, programming
- Andreas Carlsson – additional backing vocals
- Mats Berntoft – acoustic and electric guitars
- Tomas Lindberg – bass
- Ulf & Henrik Janson – string arrangement
- David Kreuger – production
- Bernard Lohr – recording (strings), mixing

== Charts ==
=== Weekly charts ===
Chart (1999–2000)	Peak position
Australia (ARIA)	13
Belgium (Ultratop 50 Flanders)	7
El Salvador (El Siglo de Torreón)	9
Estonia (Eesti Top 20)	17
Europe (Eurochart Hot 100)	8
Europe (European Hit Radio)	31
Finland (Suomen virallinen lista)	7
Finland Airplay (Radiosoittolista)	10
Germany (GfK)	50
Guatemala (El Siglo de Torreón)	4
Iceland (Íslenski Listinn Topp 40)	9
Ireland (IRMA)	1
Netherlands (Dutch Top 40)	20
Netherlands (Single Top 100)	19
Netherlands Airplay (Music & Media)	11
New Zealand (Recorded Music NZ)	8
Norway (VG-lista)	1
Scottish Singles Sales (Official Charts)	3
Spain (Promusicae)	18
Spain Airplay (Top 40 Radio)	23
Sweden (Sverigetopplistan)	6
Switzerland (Schweizer Hitparade)	25
UK Singles (Official Charts)	1
UK Airplay (Music Week)	7

=== Year-end charts ===
Chart (1999)	Position
Australia (ARIA)	95
Belgium (Ultratop 50 Flanders)	45
Netherlands (Dutch Top 40)	100
New Zealand (RIANZ)	28
Sweden (Hitlistan)	35
UK Singles (OCC)	59

Chart (2000)	Position
Brazil (Crowley)	46

== Certifications and sales ==
Region	Certification	Certified units/sales
Australia (ARIA)	Gold	35,000^{^}
New Zealand (RMNZ)	Gold	15,000^{‡}
Sweden (GLF)	Gold	15,000^{^}
United Kingdom (BPI)	Platinum	600,000^{‡}
^{^} Shipments figures based on certification alone.^{‡} Sales+streaming figures based on certification alone.

== Release history ==
Region	Date	Format(s)	Label(s)	Ref.
Sweden	9 August 1999	CD	RCA; BMG	
United Kingdom	9 August 1999	CD; cassette	RCA; BMG	
