= When You're Looking Like That =

2001 single by Westlife

Single by Westlife

from the album Coast to Coast and World of Our Own
- Released: 30 July 2001
- Studio: Cheiron (Stockholm, Sweden)
- Length: 3:52 (album version); 3:54 (single remix)
- Label: RCA; BMG
- Songwriters: Rami; Andreas Carlsson; Max Martin
- Producer: Rami

Westlife singles chronology
| "Uptown Girl" (2001) | "When You're Looking Like That" (2001) | "Queen of My Heart" (2001) |

Music video
- "When You're Looking Like That" on YouTube

"When You're Looking Like That" is a song by Irish boy band Westlife, serving as the sixth overall single from their second studio album, Coast to Coast (2000). It was first released in Sweden on 30 July 2001 and was later issued in Australia, New Zealand, Asia, Latin America, and the rest of mainland Europe. "When You're Looking Like That" peaked at number six in Denmark and was certified gold in Sweden by the International Federation of the Phonographic Industry (IFPI) for shipments of 15,000 copies.

Although it is one of the more popular tracks in the UK and has a music video being played regularly on UK music channels, the single was cancelled and was not released in the UK or Ireland and charted outside of the top 100 in the UK Singles Chart due to leakage only. It was instead issued as a double A-side single with "Queen of My Heart" and became their ninth UK number one. It was re-released in 2001 with its single remix included on the group's third studio album World of Our Own (2001). In 2019, the single charted in Ireland and peaked at number 20, giving Westlife their 28th top-20 hit in Ireland.

A Spanish version of the song, titled "Con lo bien que te ves" has also been recorded and can be found on their South African-only release, Released. The Spanish lyrics were written by Rudy Pérez.

== Background ==
The song was written by a team of Swedish songwriters, Rami Yacoub, Andreas Carlsson, and Max Martin, and it was produced by Yacoub. It was composed in the traditional verse–chorus form in B major, with Shane Filan and Mark Feehily's vocal ranging from the chords of E_{4} to A♭_{5}.

"When You're Looking Like That" along with "I Lay My Love on You" were not released in the United Kingdom. In an interview with Westlife, Feehily said that the main reason behind it was because they had not had as much exposure in Asia and Australia. It is their sixth-most-streamed song in the UK and appears in 20th place overall with 276,000 (as of 12 January 2019) units via streaming and downloads only.

== Music video ==
The music video featured montage of their concerts, fans, autograph and album signings. Miss South Africa 2000 and Miss World 2001 Top 10 semifinalist Jo-Ann Strauss was featured in the video. This is their second video in 2001 to feature their fans and fifth video throughout their band career.

== Track listings ==
- CD maxi-single
1. "When You're Looking Like That" (single remix) – 3:52
2. "Con lo bien que te ves" (single remix) (Spanish lyrics: Rudy Pérez) – 3:52
3. "Don't Get Me Wrong" (Jake, Anders von Hofsten) – 3:43
4. "I'll Be There" (Berry Gordy, Hal Davis, Willie Hutch, Bob West) – 3:54
5. "When You're Looking Like That" (music video) – 4:00
- CD single
1. "When You're Looking Like That" (single remix) – 3:52
2. "Don't Get Me Wrong" – 3:43

== Credits and personnel ==
Recording

- Recorded at Cheiron Studios (Stockholm, Sweden)

Personnel

- Rami – songwriter, producer, engineer, mixing
- Andreas Carlsson – songwriter, backing vocals
- Max Martin – songwriter, backing vocals
- John Amatiello – engineer assistant, mixing assistant, Pro Tools engineer
- Esbjörn Öhrwall – guitar
- Björn Engelmann – mastering

== Charts ==
=== Weekly charts ===
| Chart (2001) | Peak position |
|---|---|
| Australia (ARIA) | 19 |
| Belgium (Ultratop 50 Flanders) | 19 |
| Denmark (Tracklisten) | 6 |
| Europe (Eurochart Hot 100) | 63 |
| Europe (European Hit Radio) | 37 |
| Germany (GfK) | 24 |
| Latvia (Latvijas Top 20) | 12 |
| Netherlands (Dutch Top 40) | 32 |
| Netherlands (Single Top 100) | 23 |
| New Zealand (Recorded Music NZ) | 30 |
| Romania (Romanian Top 100) | 11 |
| Scottish Singles Sales (Official Charts) with "Queen of My Heart" | 1 |
| Sweden (Sverigetopplistan) | 9 |
| Switzerland (Schweizer Hitparade) | 47 |
| UK Singles (Official Charts) with "Queen of My Heart" | 1 |
| UK Airplay (Music Week) | 50 |

| Chart (2019) | Peak position |
|---|---|
| Ireland (IRMA) | 20 |

=== Year-end charts ===
| Chart (2001) | Position |
|---|---|
| Romania (Romanian Top 100) | 70 |
| Sweden (Hitlistan) | 45 |

== Certifications ==
| Region | Certification | Certified units/sales |
|---|---|---|
| Denmark (IFPI Danmark) | Gold | 45,000^{‡} |
| New Zealand (RMNZ) | Gold | 15,000^{‡} |
| Sweden (GLF) | Gold | 15,000^{^} |
| United Kingdom (BPI) | Gold | 400,000^{‡} |
^{^} Shipments figures based on certification alone.^{‡} Sales+streaming figures based on certification alone.

== Release history ==
| Region | Version | Date | Format(s) | Label(s) | Ref. |
|---|---|---|---|---|---|
| Sweden | Solo | 30 July 2001 | CD | RCA; BMG | |
| New Zealand | Solo | 6 August 2001 | CD; cassette | RCA; BMG | |
| Australia | Solo | 3 September 2001 | CD | RCA; BMG | |
| United Kingdom | with "Queen of My Heart" | 5 November 2001 | CD; cassette | RCA; BMG | |
