= Westlife discography =

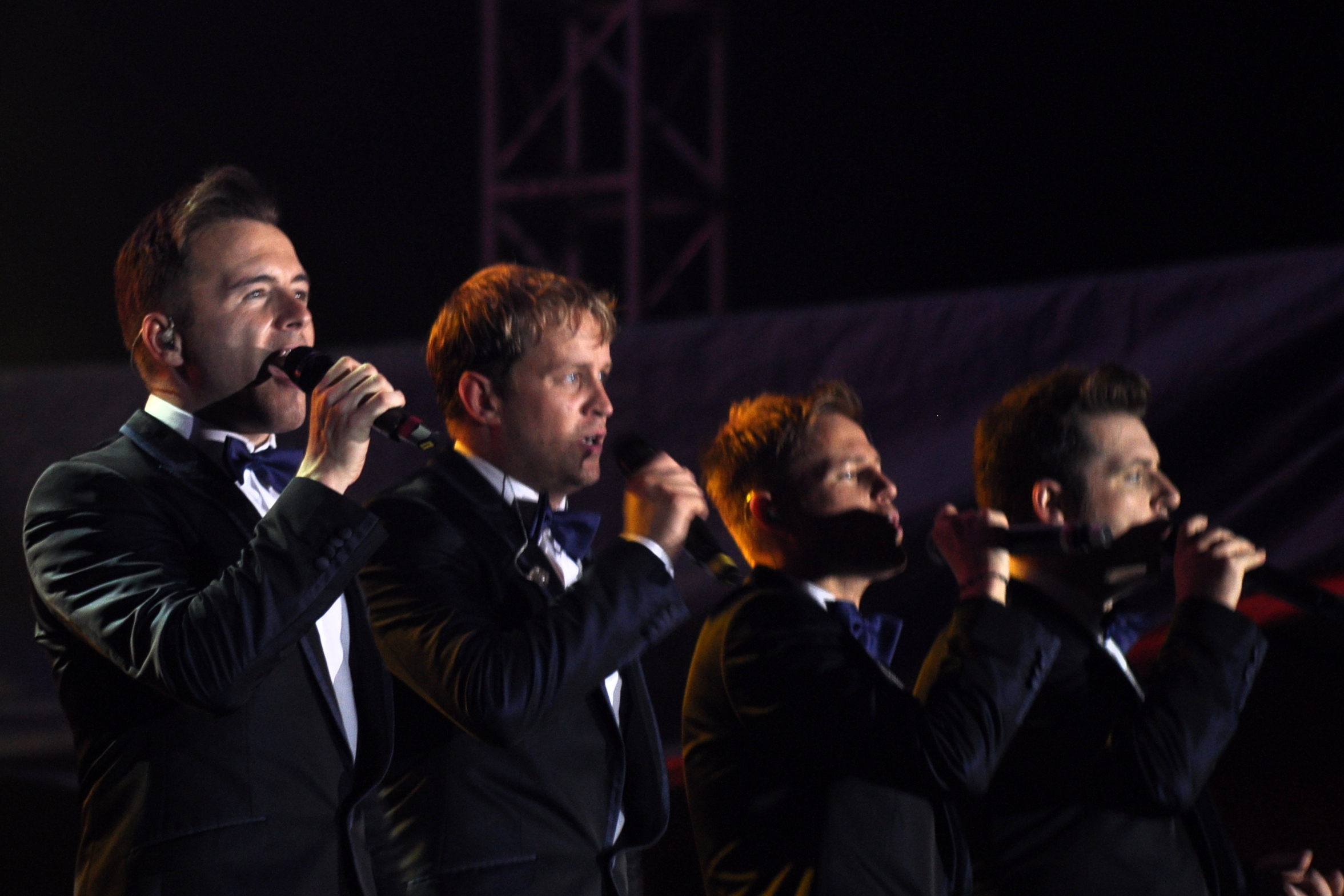
- Westlife performing live on their Gravity Tour in October 2011 in Hanoi, Vietnam
- Studio albums: 12
- Live albums: 1
- Compilation albums: 11
- Singles: 42
- Video albums: 19
- Music videos: 45
- Promotional singles: 13

Irish boy band Westlife have released twelve studio albums, eleven compilation albums, one live album, nineteen video albums, forty-one singles, thirteen promotional singles, and forty-five music videos. The band was signed under the likes of Simon Cowell, and Clive Davis and under record labels' BMG, S Records, Arista Records, Sony BMG, Syco Music, Sony Music Entertainment and RCA Records from 1998 to 2012, Universal Music Group and Virgin EMI Records in 2018 to 2020, Warner Music and East West Records in 2021 to 2022, Tencent Music Entertainment in 2024 and Sony Music in 2025-present. Their biggest-selling album is their first Greatest Hits compilation, followed by Coast to Coast, with six of their albums selling one million copies or more. Their biggest selling video is Where Dreams Come True, which has sold 240,000 copies to date.

In 2012, the Official Charts Company listed Westlife 34th amongst the biggest-selling singles artists in British music history. They are currently the sixteenth biggest group of all time overall. They are also currently ranked twenty-sixth with the most number ones albums of all time. They have had 36 number-one albums worldwide. This earned them the following Guinness World Records: first to achieve six consecutive number-one singles in the UK, most singles to debut at number one on the UK chart, and the top-selling album group in the United Kingdom of the 21st century. Despite their success, Westlife never managed to break into the United States, achieving only one hit single in 2000, their debut single "Swear It Again", which peaked at number 20 on Billboard Hot 100 and was certified Gold.

As of July 2024, the group has sold more than 55 million records worldwide, as well as amassing more than a billion global streams and one billion YouTube views.

== Albums ==
=== Studio albums ===
List of studio albums, with selected chart positions, sales figures, and certifications
Title	Album details	Peak chart positions										Sales	Certifications
Title	Album details	IRE	AUS	AUT	DEN	NLD	NZ	NOR	SWE	SWI	UK	Sales	Certifications
Westlife	Released: 1 November 1999; Label: BMG; Formats: Cassette, CD, digital download, LP, streaming	1	15	—	12	8	5	1	5	25	2	DEN: 16,797 (Note: Denmark sales figures for Westlife as of December 2000.); NOR: 95,000 (Note: Norway sales figures for Westlife as of July 2009.); UK: 1,382,676 (Note: United Kingdom combined sales figures for Westlife as of December 2001. The album sold 770,416 copies in 1999, 469,000 copies in 2000, and 143,260 copies in 2001.); WW: 8,000,000 (Note: Worldwide sales figures for Westlife as of April 2000.)	IRMA: 13× Platinum; ARIA: Gold; BPI: 5× Platinum; GLF: Platinum; NVPI: Gold; RMNZ: 2× Platinum
Coast to Coast	Released: 6 November 2000; Label: BMG; Formats: Cassette, CD, digital download, LP, streaming	1	40	59	27	13	2	6	3	38	1	DEN: 24,801 (Note: Denmark sales figures for Coast to Coast as of December 2000.); NOR: 80,000 (Note: Norway sales figures for Coast to Coast as of July 2009.); SWE: 80,000 (Note: Sweden sales figures for Coast to Coast as of December 2000.); UK: 1,725,393 (Note: United Kingdom combined sales figures for Coast to Coast as of November 2019..); WW: 7,000,000 (Note: Worldwide sales figures for Coast to Coast as of 2002.)	IRMA: 7× Platinum; ARIA: Gold; BPI: 6× Platinum; BVMI: Gold; GLF: Platinum; IFPI SWI: Gold; NVPI: Gold; RMNZ: 4× Platinum
World of Our Own	Released: 12 November 2001; Label: BMG; Formats: Cassette, CD, digital download, LP, streaming	1	80	9	3	10	3	7	1	19	1	UK: 814,690 (Note: United Kingdom sales figures for World of Our Own as of December 2001.); WW: 4,000,000 (Note: Worldwide sales figures for World of Our Own as of 2002.)	BPI: 4× Platinum; BVMI: Gold; IFPI AUT: Gold; GLF: Platinum; IFPI SWI: Gold; NVPI: Gold; RMNZ: 2× Platinum
Turnaround	Released: 24 November 2003; Label: BMG; Formats: Cassette, CD, digital download, LP, streaming	1	—	42	4	33	42	37	5	24	1	UK: 752,583 (Note: United Kingdom sales figures for Turnaround as of December 2005.)	BPI: 2× Platinum; GLF: Gold
...Allow Us to Be Frank	Released: 8 November 2004; Label: Sony BMG; Formats: Cassette, CD, digital download, LP, streaming	2	—	—	15	32	—	—	5	75	3	UK: 653,405 (Note: United Kingdom sales figures for ...Allow Us to Be Frank as of December 2005.)	BPI: 2× Platinum
Face to Face	Released: 31 October 2005; Label: Sony BMG; Formats: Cassette, CD, DualDisc, digital download, LP, streaming	1	1	—	19	30	—	7	9	14	1	UK: 1,200,923 (Note: United Kingdom sales figures for Face to Face as of March 2006.)	IRMA: 8× Platinum; ARIA: Platinum; BPI: 4× Platinum; GLF: Gold
The Love Album	Released: 20 November 2006; Label: Sony BMG; Formats: Cassette, CD, digital download, LP, streaming	1	11	49	—	49	2	1	3	27	1	UK: 630,000 (Note: United Kingdom sales figures for The Love Album as of January 2007.)	IRMA: 10× Platinum; ARIA: Platinum; BPI: 3× Platinum; GLF: Gold; RMNZ: 3× Platinum
Back Home	Released: 5 November 2007; Label: Sony BMG; Formats: Cassette, CD, digital download, LP, streaming	1	14	65	—	48	12	18	33	19	1	UK: 980,000 (Note: United Kingdom sales figures for Back Home as of October 2009.)	IRMA: 5× Platinum; BPI: 3× Platinum; GLF: Gold; RMNZ: Gold
Where We Are	Released: 30 November 2009; Label: Sony; Formats: Cassette, CD, digital download, LP, streaming	2	—	53	—	—	13	—	8	25	2	UK: 490,569 (Note: United Kingdom sales figures for Where We Are as of November 2010.)	IRMA: 3× Platinum; BPI: 2× Platinum; GLF: Gold; RMNZ: Gold
Gravity	Released: 22 November 2010; Label: Sony; Formats: Cassette, CD, digital download, LP, streaming	1	—	—	—	76	22	—	46	50	3	UK: 358,943 (Note: United Kingdom sales figures for Gravity as of November 2011.)	IRMA: 2× Platinum; BPI: Platinum
Spectrum	Released: 15 November 2019; Label: Virgin EMI; Formats: Cassette, CD, digital download, LP, streaming	1	— (Note: Spectrum did not enter the ARIA Albums Chart, but peaked at number seven on the ARIA Digital Album Chart.)	—	—	—	—	—	—	23	1	IRE: 8,900 (Note: Ireland first-week sales figures for Spectrum.); UK: 168,217 (Note: United Kingdom sales figures for Spectrum as of March 2021.); WW: 500,000 (Note: Worldwide sales figures for Spectrum as of February 2021.)	IRMA: Platinum; BPI: Gold
Wild Dreams	Released: 26 November 2021; Label: East West; Formats: Cassette, CD, digital download, LP, streaming	2	—	—	—	46	—	—	—	71	2		BPI: Gold
"—" denotes album that did not chart or was not released

=== Compilation albums ===
List of compilation albums, with selected chart positions, sales figures, and certifications
Title	Album details	Peak chart positions										Sales	Certifications
Title	Album details	IRE	AUS	AUT	GER	NLD	NZ	NOR	SWE	SWI	UK	Sales	Certifications
Unbreakable – The Greatest Hits Volume 1	Released: 11 November 2002; Label: BMG; Formats: Cassette, CD, digital download, LP, streaming	1	66	14	7	3	1	10	2	14	1	UK: 1,896,765 (Note: United Kingdom sales figures for Unbreakable – The Greatest Hits Volume 1 as of November 2019.)	BPI: 6× Platinum; BVMI: Gold; GLF: Platinum; IFPI SWI: Gold; NVPI: Gold; RMNZ: 2× Platinum
Greatest Hits	Release: 18 November 2011; Label: Sony, RCA; Formats: Cassette, CD, digital download, LP, streaming	1	—	—	75	64	17	31	46	96	4		IRMA: 3× Platinum; BPI: 3× Platinum; RMNZ: Gold
The Love Songs	Release: 3 February 2014; Label: Camden, Sony; Formats: CD, digital download	42	—	—	—	—	—	—	—	—	— (Note: "The Love Songs" did not enter the UK Albums Chart, but peaked at number 18 on the Official UK Budget Albums Chart.)		
25: The Ultimate Collection	Release: 8 May 2026; Label: Sony; Formats: CD, digital download, LP, streaming	2	91	64	31	24	21	—	— (Note: "25: The Ultimate Collection" did not enter the Sweden Top 100 Albums chart but debuted and peaked at number 15 on the Swedish Physical Albums Chart.)	27	2		BPI: Silver
"—" denotes album that did not chart or was not released

==== Limited release compilation albums ====
List of limited release compilation albums
Title	Album details
No.1 Hits and Rare Tracks	Release: 23 August 2000 (Japan); Label: BMG, RCA; Formats: CD
Golden Hits	Release: 2001 (Hong Kong); Label: BMG, RCA; Formats: CD
Grandes Exitos	Release: 2002 (Venezuela); Label: BMG, RCA; Formats: CD
Released	Release: 28 March 2005 (South Africa); Label: Sony BMG; Formats: CD
Collector's Edition	Release: 1 November 2011; Label: RCA; Formats: CD
Diamond – The Ultimate Collection	Release: 2012 (South Africa); Label: Sony BMG; Formats: CD
Best of the Best	Release: 14 July 2014 (Malaysia); Label: Sony Music; Formats: CD

=== Live albums ===
List of live albums
Title	Video details
The Farewell Tour: Live at Croke Park	Released: 18 December 2012; Label: BBC; Formats: Digital download

== Singles ==
=== As lead artist ===
==== 1990s and 2000s ====
List of singles released in the 1990s and 2000s, showing year released, selected chart positions, sales, certifications, and originating album
Title	Year	Peak chart positions										Sales	Certifications	Album
Title	Year	IRE	AUS	GER	NLD	NZ	NOR	SWE	SWI	UK	US	Sales	Certifications	Album
"Swear It Again"	1999	1	12	—	27	1	—	12	25	1	20	UK: 365,000 (Note: United Kingdom sales figures for "Swear It Again" as of October 2010.); US: 600,000 (Note: United States sales figures for "Swear It Again" as of February 2001.)	ARIA: Gold; BPI: Platinum; RIAA: Gold; RMNZ: Gold	Westlife
"If I Let You Go"	1999	1	13	50	19	8	1	6	25	1	—	UK: 315,000 (Note: United Kingdom sales figures for "If I Let You Go" as of October 2010.)	ARIA: Gold; BPI: Platinum; GLF: Gold; RMNZ: Gold	Westlife
"Flying Without Wings"	1999	1	36	85	17	6	7	12	—	1	—	UK: 800,000 (Note: United Kingdom sales figures for "Flying Without Wings" as of November 2021.)	BPI: Platinum; GLF: Gold; RMNZ: Gold	Westlife
"I Have a Dream"/ "Seasons in the Sun"	1999	1	31	24	— (Note: "I Have a Dream"/ "Flying Without Wings" did not enter the Dutch Single Top 100, but peaked at number 19 on the Dutch Top 40 chart.)	10	10	15	18	1	—	UK: 707,000 (Note: United Kingdom sales figures for "I Have a Dream"/"Seasons in the Sun" as of November 2021.)	BPI: Platinum; RMNZ: Gold	Westlife
"Fool Again"	2000	2	—	80	23	—	—	5	39	1	—	UK: 215,000 (Note: United Kingdom sales figures for "Fool Again" as of October 2010.)	BPI: Gold; GLF: Gold	Westlife
"My Love"	2000	1	36	57	9	3	3	1	38	1	—	UK: 300,000 (Note: United Kingdom sales figures for "My Love" as of October 2010.)	BPI: Platinum; GLF: Gold; RMNZ: Gold	Coast to Coast
"What Makes a Man"	2000	2	—	—	—	—	—	—	—	2	—	UK: 400,000 (Note: United Kingdom sales figures for "What Makes a Man" as of October 2010.)	BPI: Gold	Coast to Coast
"I Lay My Love on You"	2001	—	29	50	12	24	—	10	39	—	—			Coast to Coast
"Uptown Girl"	2001	1	6	8	2	4	3	2	13	1	—	UK: 1,100,000 (Note: United Kingdom sales figures for "Uptown Girl" as of November 2021.)	ARIA: Platinum; BPI: 2× Platinum; GLF: Gold; RMNZ: Gold	Coast to Coast
"When You're Looking Like That"	2001	20	19	24	23	30	—	9	47	188	—	UK: 276,000 (Note: United Kingdom sales figures for "When You're Looking Like That" as of November 2021.)	BPI: Gold; GLF: Gold; RMNZ: Gold	Coast to Coast
"Queen of My Heart"	2001	1	—	27	12	4	12	3	37	1	—	UK: 335,000 (Note: United Kingdom sales figures for "Queen of My Heart" as of October 2010.)	BPI: Platinum; GLF: Gold; RMNZ: Gold	World of Our Own
"World of Our Own"	2002	3	21	11	29	6	13	11	26	1	—	UK: 225,000 (Note: United Kingdom sales figures for "World of Our Own" as of October 2010.)	BPI: Platinum; RMNZ: Gold	World of Our Own
"Bop Bop Baby"	2002	4	56	15	23	21	—	16	36	5	—	UK: 120,000 (Note: United Kingdom sales figures for "Bop Bop Baby" as of October 2010.)	BPI: Silver	World of Our Own
"Unbreakable"	2002	1	—	12	19	44	9	5	41	1	—	UK: 210,000 (Note: United Kingdom sales figures for "Unbreakable" as of October 2010.)	BPI: Silver	Unbreakable: The; Greatest Hits Volume 1
"Tonight"/ "Miss You Nights"	2003	1	65	47	55	—	—	33	—	3	—	UK: 115,000 (Note: United Kingdom sales figures for "Tonight"/ "Miss You Nights" as of October 2010.)		Unbreakable: The; Greatest Hits Volume 1
"Hey Whatever"	2003	2	—	22	30	39	—	5	53	4	—	UK: 75,000 (Note: United Kingdom sales figures for "Hey Whatever" as of 2003.)		Turnaround
"Mandy"	2003	1	—	14	27	—	15	4	30	1	—	UK: 235,082 (Note: United Kingdom sales figures for "Mandy" as of September 2018.)	BPI: Gold	Turnaround
"Obvious"	2004	2	—	39	44	—	—	25	69	3	—			Turnaround
"Ain't That a Kick in the Head"	2004	—	—	—	41	—	—	20	—	— (Note: "Ain't That a Kick in the Head" did not enter the UK Singles Chart, but peaked at number four on the UK Singles Downloads Chart.)	—			Allow Us to Be Frank
"Smile"	2004	—	—	—	—	—	—	37	—	—	—			Allow Us to Be Frank
"You Raise Me Up"	2005	1	3	11	47	—	3	7	18	1	—	UK: 450,000 (Note: United Kingdom sales figures for "You Raise Me Up" as of October 2011.)	ARIA: Platinum; BPI: Platinum; BVMI: Gold; RMNZ: Gold	Face to Face
"When You Tell Me That You Love Me" (featuring Diana Ross)	2005	2	—	—	45	—	—	—	—	2	—	UK: 120,000 (Note: United Kingdom sales figures for "When You Tell Me That You Love Me" as of October 2010.)		Face to Face
"Amazing"	2006	3	34	53	—	—	—	36	58	4	—	UK: 47,049 (Note: United Kingdom sales figures for "Amazing" as of November 2009.)		Face to Face
"The Rose"	2006	1	—	—	—	—	—	4	85	1	—	UK: 140,000 (Note: United Kingdom sales figures for "The Rose" as of October 2010.)	BPI: Silver	The Love Album
"Home"	2007	2	—	70	—	—	7	8	—	3	—	UK: 200,000 (Note: United Kingdom sales figures for "Home" as of October 2010.)	BPI: Silver	Back Home
"Us Against the World"	2008	6	—	—	—	—	—	—	—	8	—			Back Home
"Something Right"	2008	43	92	—	—	—	—	46	—	—	—			Back Home
"What About Now"	2009	2	—	—	—	—	—	13	—	2	—	UK: 270,000 (Note: United Kingdom sales figures for "What About Now" as of October 2010.)	BPI: Platinum	Where We Are
"—" denotes single that did not chart or was not released

==== 2010s and 2020s ====
List of singles released in the 2010s and 2020s, showing year released, selected chart positions, certifications, and originating album
Title	Year	Peak chart positions										Certifications	Album
Title	Year	IRE	BEL (FL) Tip	BEL (WA) Tip	CHN Intl.	HRV	HUN	NZ Hot	SCO	SWE Heat.	UK	Certifications	Album
"Safe"	2010	4	—	—	—	—	—	—	7	—	10		Gravity
"Lighthouse"	2011	11	—	—	—	—	—	—	27	—	32		Greatest Hits
"Hello My Love"	2019	2	27	1	16	45	—	18	2	10	13	BPI: Platinum	Spectrum
"Better Man"	2019	8	—	—	44	—	24	26	2	—	26	BPI: Silver	Spectrum
"Dynamite"	2019	27	—	—	24	—	—	—	10	—	— (Note: "Dynamite" did not enter the UK Singles Chart, but peaked at number 14 on the UK Singles Sales Chart.)		Spectrum
"My Blood"	2019	46	—	—	*	—	—	—	6	—	96		Spectrum
"Starlight"	2021	29	—	—	*	—	—	—	*	—	66		Wild Dreams
"My Hero"	2021	81	—	—	*	—	—	—	*	—	— (Note: "My Hero" did not enter the UK Singles Chart, but peaked at number 10 on the UK Singles Sales Chart.)		Wild Dreams
"Alone Together"	2022	—	—	—	*	—	—	—	*	—	—		Wild Dreams
"Chariot"	2025	58	—	—	*	—	—	—	*	—	— (Note: "Chariot" did not enter the UK Top 100 but debuted and peaked at number 3 on the UK Singles Downloads Chart Top 100 on 31 October 2025.)		25: The Ultimate Collection
"Your Love Amazes Me"	2026	—	—	—	*	—	—	—	*	—	— (Note: "Your Love Amazes Me" did not enter the UK Top 100 but debuted and peaked at number 15 on the UK Singles Downloads Chart Top 100 and number 48 on the UK Singles Sales Chart Top 100 on 30 April 2026.)		25: The Ultimate Collection
"—" denotes single that did not chart or was not released "*" denotes the chart is discontinued

=== As a featured artist ===
List of singles as featured artist, showing year released, selected chart positions, sales, certifications, and originating album
Single	Year	Peak chart positions										Sales	Certifications	Album
Single	Year	IRE	AUS	DEN	NLD	NZ	NOR	SCO	SWE	SWI	UK	Sales	Certifications	Album
"Against All Odds" (Mariah Carey featuring Westlife)	2000	1	52	2	29	—	2	1	3	—	1	DEN: 4,576 (Note: Denmark sales figures for "Against All Odds" as of December 2000.); UK: 600,000 (Note: United Kingdom sales figures for "Against All Odds" as of May 2026.)	BPI: Platinum; GLF: Gold; IFPI DEN: Gold	Rainbow
"Everybody Hurts" (with Helping Haiti)	2010	1	28	—	— (Note: "Everybody Hurts" did not enter the Dutch Single Top 100, but peaked at number five on the Dutch Top 40 Tipparade Chart.)	17	—	1	21	16	1	UK: 620,596 (Note: United Kingdom sales figures for "Everybody Hurts" as of September 2010.)	BPI: Platinum	Non-album single
"—" denotes single that did not chart or was not released

=== Promotional singles ===
List of promotional singles, showing year released, selected chart positions, and originating album
Title	Year	Peak chart positions		Album
Title	Year	UK	UKR	Album
"Until the End of Time"	2000	—	—	Swear It Again - EP
"My Private Movie"	2000	—	—	Westlife (US edition)
"More Than Words"	2000	—	—	Westlife/Grandes Exitos
"Angel"	2002	—	—	World of Our Own
"Evergreen"	2002	—	—	World of Our Own
"Flying Without Wings" (featuring BoA)	2002	—	—	Unbreakable: The Greatest Hits Volume 1 (Asian edition)
"Flying Without Wings" (featuring Cristian Castro)	2002	—	—	Unbreakable: The Greatest Hits Volume 1 (Spanish/Mexican edition)
"Flying Without Wings" (live)	2004	— (Note: "Flying Without Wings" (live) did not enter the UK Singles Chart, but peaked at number one on the UK Singles Downloads Chart.)	—	Turnaround Tour
"Beyond the Sea"	2004	—	—	Fly Me To The Moon - Single
"Total Eclipse of the Heart"	2007	129	132	The Love Album
"I Will Reach You"	2011	—	—	Gravity
"Beautiful World"	2011	—	—	Greatest Hits
"Without You"	2019	—	—	Spectrum
"—" denotes song that did not chart or was not released

== Other charted songs ==
List of other charted songs, with selected chart positions, showing year released and originating album
Title	Year	Peak chart positions					Album
Title	Year	IRE	CIS	SWE	UK	UKR	Album
"Moon River"	2004	—	—	—	—	195	...Allow Us to Be Frank
"Miss You When I'm Dreaming"	2006	—	130	—	—	99	Amazing - Single
"All Out of Love" (featuring Delta Goodrem)	2006	—	—	31	— (Note: "All Out of Love" did not enter the UK Singles Chart, but peaked at number 45 on the UK Singles Downloads Chart.)	—	The Love Album
"You Light Up My Life"	2006	—	—	—	171	—	The Love Album
"All or Nothing"	2006	—	—	—	142	—	The Love Album
"Hard to Say I'm Sorry"	2007	—	—	—	135	—	Home - Single
"I'm Already There"	2007	47	—	—	62	—	Back Home
"—" denotes song that did not chart or was not released

== Soundtrack appearances ==
List of soundtrack appearances
Year	Song	Movie	Ref.
1999	"We Are One"	A Monkey's Tale	
2000	"Flying Without Wings"	Pokémon: The Movie 2000	
2000	"I Don't Wanna Fight"	Maybe Baby	
2011	"Safe"	Dolphin Tale	
2014	"You Raise Me Up"	Mrs. Brown's Boys D'Movie	

== Videography ==
=== Documentaries ===
List of documentaries with certifications
Title	Video details	Certifications
The Westlife Story	Released: 26 June 2000; Label: Sony BMG	BPI: Platinum
Westlife – The Complete Story	Released: 18 November 2002; Label: BMG	

=== Concert tours ===
List of concert tours with certifications
Title	Video details	Certifications
Where Dreams Come True	Released: 19 November 2001; Label: Sony BMG	BPI: 4× Platinum
The Greatest Hits Tour	Released: 6 October 2003; Label: Sony BMG	BPI: 3× Platinum; IFPI DEN: Platinum
The Turnaround Tour	Released: 15 November 2004; Label: BMG	BPI: Platinum
The No 1's Tour	Released: 21 November 2005; Label: Sony BMG	ARIA: Gold; BPI: 2× Platinum
Live at Wembley	Released: 27 November 2006; Label: Sony BMG	ARIA: Gold; BPI: 2× Platinum
Live at Croke Park	Released: 24 November 2008; Label: Sony BMG	IRMA: 6× Platinum; BPI: 2× Platinum
Where We Are Tour: Live from The O2	Released: 29 November 2010; Label: Sony BMG	IRMA: Platinum; BPI: Platinum
The Farewell Tour – Live at Croke Park	Released: 19 November 2012; Label: Sony Music, RCA, 2Entertain	BPI: 4× Platinum
The Twenty Tour – Live at Croke Park	Released: 13 March 2020; Label: Universal, Virgin EMI	

=== Music video compilations, audio and video albums or singles ===
List of music video compilations, audio and video albums or singles, with certifications
Title	Video details	Certifications
Westlife: Karaoke	Released: 2001; Label: BMG	
Uptown Girl	Released: 12 March 2001; Label: BMG	BPI: Platinum
Coast to Coast: Up Close and Personal	Released: 30 November 2000; Label: BMG	BPI: 3× Platinum
World of Our Own	Released: 25 February 2002; Label: BMG	BPI: Gold
The Greatest Hits	Released: 18 November 2002; Label: Sony BMG	BPI: 3× Platinum
Back Home	Released: 3 November 2007; Label: Sony BMG	BPI: Platinum
The Karaoke Collection	Released: 2009; Label: Sony BMG	
Greatest Hits Deluxe Edition Bonus DVD	Released: 21 November 2011; Label: RCA, Sony Music	BPI: 2× Platinum

=== Music videos ===
List of music videos, showing year released, title, and director
Song	Director	Ref.
"Swear It Again"	Wayne Isham, Brett Turnbull	
"If I Let You Go"	Sven Harding	
"Flying Without Wings"	Cameron Casey	
"I Have a Dream"	Cameron Casey	
"Seasons in the Sun"	Cameron Casey, Simon Brand	
"Fool Again"	Cameron Casey	
"Swear It Again" (US version)	Nigel Dick	
"Against All Odds" (Mariah Carey featuring Westlife)	Bill Boatman, P. Snyde	
"My Love"	Cameron Casey	
"What Makes a Man"	Stuart Gosling	
"I Lay My Love On You"	Stuart Gosling	
"Uptown Girl"	Stuart Gosling	
"When You're Looking Like That"	Matthew Amos	
"Queen of My Heart"	Phil Griffin	
"Angel"	Max & Dania	
"World of Our Own"	Cameron Casey	
"Bop Bop Baby"	Max & Dania	
"World of Our Own" (US version)	Antti Jokinen	
"Unbreakable"	Antti Jokinen	
"Tonight"	Antti Jokinen	
"Miss You Nights"	Antti Jokinen	
"Flying Without Wings" (featuring BoA)	—N/a	
"Flying Without Wings" (featuring Cristian Castro)	—N/a	
"Hey Whatever"	David "Mouldy" Mould	
"Mandy"	Tim Royes	
"Obvious"	Max & Dania	
"Ain't That a Kick in the Head"	Marcus Raboy	
"Smile"	Marcus Raboy	
"You Raise Me Up"	Alex Hemming	
"When You Tell Me That You Love Me" (featuring Diana Ross)	Ashley Pugh	
"Amazing"	Max & Dania	
"The Rose"	Alex Hemming	
"Home"	Max & Dania, Mike Lipscombe	
"Us Against the World"	Max & Dania	
"Something Right"	Julian Gibbs	
"What About Now"	Philip Andelman	
"Everybody Hurts" (with Helping Haiti)	Joseph Kahn	
"Safe"	Sean de Sparengo	
"Lighthouse"	Philip Andelman	
"Beautiful World"	—N/a	
"Hello My Love"	Robert Hales	
"Better Man"	Lochlainn McKenna	
"Dynamite"	Paul "Coy" Allen	
"My Blood"	Robert Hales	
"Starlight"	Mike Baldwin	

== See also ==
- List of songs recorded by Westlife
- List of best-selling boy bands
- UK Singles Chart records and statistics
- List of artists who reached number one on the UK Singles Chart
- List of best-selling music artists in the United Kingdom in singles sales
- List of artists by number of UK Singles Chart number ones
- List of UK Singles Downloads Chart number ones of the 2000s
- List of UK Singles Chart number ones of the 2000s
- List of UK Albums Chart number ones of the 2000s
- List of artists who reached number one in Ireland
- List of songs that reached number one on the Irish Singles Chart
- List of best-selling albums in the Philippines

== Footnotes ==
Notes for sales figures

Notes for peak chart positions
