= The Love Songs (Westlife album) =

Greatest hits album by Westlife
- Released: February 2014
- Label: Camden; Sony

Westlife chronology
Greatest Hits (2011)	The Love Songs (2014)	Spectrum (2019)

The Love Songs is the third greatest hits album released by Irish boy band Westlife. It was released in February 2014, following Unbreakable: The Greatest Hits Volume 1 (2002) and Greatest Hits (2011).

== Track listing ==
No.	Title	Writer(s)	Album	Length
1.	"Unbreakable"	Jörgen Elofsson, John Reid	Unbreakable: The Greatest Hits Volume 1	4:31
2.	"Mandy"	Scott English, Richard Kerr	Turnaround	3:17
3.	"Swear It Again"	Wayne Hector, Steve Mac	Westlife	4:08
4.	"Fool Again"	Elofsson, David Kreuger, Per Magnusson	Westlife	3:53
5.	"The Rose"	Amanda McBroom	The Love Album	3:38
6.	"World of Our Own"	Hector, Mac, Dennis Morgan, Simon Climie	World of Our Own	3:31
7.	"My Love"	Elofsson, Kreuger, Magnusson, Pelle Nylén	Coast to Coast	3:51
8.	"More Than Words"	Gary Cherone, Nuno Bettencourt	Westlife	3:53
9.	"What About Now"	Ben Moody, David Hodges, Josh Hartzler	Where We Are	4:09
10.	"I Wanna Grow Old with You"	Nicky Byrne, Kian Egan, Markus Feehily, Shane Filan, Bryan McFadden	World of Our Own	4:07
11.	"Something Right"	Arnthor Birgisson, Rami Yacoub, Savan Kotecha	Back Home	3:12
12.	"Total Eclipse of the Heart"	Jim Steinman	The Love Album	4:39
13.	"Us Against the World"	Birgisson, Kotecha, Yacoub	Back Home	3:59
14.	"You Raise Me Up"	Brendan Graham, Rolf Løvland	Face to Face	4:00
15.	"Let There Be Love"	Ian Grant, Lionel Rand	...Allow Us to Be Frank	2:43
16.	"When You're Looking Like That" (Single Remix)	Max Martin, Andreas Carlsson, Yacoub	World of Our Own	3:52

== Charts ==
Chart (2014-19)	Peak position
Irish Albums (IRMA)	49
Scottish Albums (OCC)	67
South Korean Albums (Circle)	47
Taiwanese Albums (Five Music)	12
UK Budget Albums (OCC)	18

== Certifications ==
Region	Certification	Certified units/sales
New Zealand (RMNZ)	Gold	7,500^{‡}
^{‡} Sales+streaming figures based on certification alone.
