= Greatest Hits (Westlife album) =

Greatest hits album by Westlife
- Released: 18 November 2011
- Recorded: 1998–2011
- Genres: Pop; pop rock; teen pop
- Labels: RCA; Sony
- Producers: John Shanks; Steve Mac; Per Magnusson; David Kreuger; David Foster; Pete Waterman; Steve Robson; TTW; Rami Yacoub; Quiz & Larossi; Carl Falk; Arnthor Birgisson

Westlife chronology
| Gravity (2010) | Greatest Hits (2011) | The Love Songs (2014) |

Singles from Greatest Hits
- 1. "Lighthouse" Released: 14 November 2011

Greatest Hits is the second greatest hits album release by Irish boy band Westlife. It was released on 18 November 2011 by RCA Records and Sony Music. Greatest Hits follows their previous compilation Unbreakable: The Greatest Hits Volume 1 (2002) and was their last before their split in the months following its release. The album is the group's first album not under Syco Music and not under the tutelage of Simon Cowell, having left Syco and Cowell in March 2011. The album contains 14 singles spanning throughout the band's career and 4 new songs produced by John Shanks. The standard edition of the album contains eighteen tracks; an expanded deluxe edition features a bonus disc and a DVD containing nearly all of the band's music videos up to that point. The album's lead single "Lighthouse" was released on 14 November 2011.

Greatest Hits received mixed reviews from music critics, with some reviewers praising the compilation's structure, while others disliked the group's musical style. The compilation reached No. 4 in the UK Albums Chart, and has sold more than 900,000 units being certified 3× Platinum by the British Phonographic Industry as of June 2024. The album debuted at the No. 1 position on the Irish Albums Chart and performed moderately elsewhere.

== Background ==
On 5 September 2011, it was confirmed the album would be simply titled Greatest Hits. On 12 October 2011, the group announced the track listing on their official website. Amazon.co.uk and Play.com released editions that included free postcards and member signatures. A limited-release signed edition sold out in less than 24 hours.

There are four new tracks on the standard edition: "Beautiful World" (written by Feehily, Shanks and Ruth-Anne Cunningham), "Wide Open" and "Last Mile of the Way" (co-written by Byrne, Filan, Dimitri Ehrlich, Coyle Girelli) and the lead single "Lighthouse". The new tracks on the album were recorded from May - September 2011 with the band's Gravity producer Shanks and new producers Dan Radclyffe and Boxsta Martin. Bryne said that the new tracks took "four or five weeks" to record. In 2014, Dimitri Ehrlich, co-writer of the song "Last Mile of the Way", posted a demo of the song on his SoundCloud account.

== Album artwork ==
The album photoshoot took place in South Africa starting on 17 September 2011, alongside the lead single music video shoot. On 12 October 2011, the official site posted the album artwork. Julia Simpson of Yahoo OMG! UK reported: "the artwork for their brand new album sees them striking one of their best model poses yet."

== Reception ==
Professional ratings
Review scores
| Source | Rating |
|---|---|
| BBC Music | (mixed) |
| Digital Spy | 4/5 stars |
| Entertainment Focus | 2/5 stars |
| Daily Express | 3/5 stars |
| Female First | (positive) |
| Rovi Music | 2.5/5 stars |
| Star Magazine | 3/5 stars |
| Trash Lounge | 5/5 stars |
| Allmusic | 2.5/5 stars |

Greatest Hits received mixed reviews from music critics. Critics that positively received the album praised the album's track listing and new songs, particularly "Beautiful World". Reviewers that criticized the album also noted the group's repetitive formula in their songs.

Shaun Kitchener of Trash Lounge gave the compilation a perfect five stars, calling it "the perfect way for the band to bid farewell." Robert Copsey of Digital Spy gave the album four stars out of five, praising the inclusion of numerous hits in the track listing, as well as the new songs of the compilation. However, he was disappointed that the new songs "point to what could have been an interesting new direction for the band". Alistair McGeorge of Female First called the album a "fine retrospective of one of the best boy-bands in history", as well as assuring the listeners that they will be "taken on a journey from the band’s beginnings through to their last recordings, constantly reminded of the talent they showed."

Fraser McAlpine of BBC Music gave a mixed review of the album, noting the repetitive structure of the group's previous hits, and that listening to the album felt "strange". Despite this, he praised the album's last three tracks. Simon Gage of Daily Express said that the compilation "needs no introduction with big key-change numbers like "Flying Without Wings" and "You Raise Me Up" telling their own story." Star Magazine UK called the group's formula "annoyingly, irresistibly effective" and that "it's the ballads they’ll be remembered for." Jon O'Brien of Rovi Music gave the album a borderline two and a half out of five stars, saying, "while this collection contains a few pop gems, it's a samey and uninspiring listen that suggests their split has been well overdue." He also noted that numerous uptempo songs and four No. 1 hits ("Seasons in the Sun", "Fool Again", "Unbreakable" and "The Rose") were excluded from the album's standard edition. Pip Ellwood of Entertainment Focus gave the album a negative review, saying that listening to the album was like "listening to one song for just over an hour." While Allmusic only gave 2.5 of 5 stars.

== Track listing ==
- Standard edition

| No. | Title | Writer(s) | Album | Length |
|---|---|---|---|---|
| 1. | "Swear It Again" (radio edit) | Wayne Hector, Steve Mac | Westlife (1999) | 4:08 |
| 2. | "If I Let You Go" (radio edit) | Jörgen Elofsson, David Kreuger, Per Magnusson | Westlife | 3:41 |
| 3. | "Flying Without Wings" | Hector, Mac | Westlife | 3:35 |
| 4. | "I Have a Dream" (remix) | Benny Andersson, Björn Ulvaeus | Coast to Coast (2000) | 4:13 |
| 5. | "Against All Odds (Take a Look at Me Now)" (with Mariah Carey) | Phil Collins | Coast to Coast | 3:19 |
| 6. | "My Love" (radio edit) | Elofsson, Kreuger, Magnusson, Pelle Nylén | Coast to Coast | 3:51 |
| 7. | "Uptown Girl" (radio edit) | Billy Joel | World of Our Own (2001) | 3:05 |
| 8. | "Queen of My Heart" (radio edit) | Hector, Mac, John McLaughlin, Steve Robson | World of Our Own | 4:18 |
| 9. | "World of Our Own" | Hector, Mac, Dennis Morgan, Simon Climie | World of Our Own | 3:28 |
| 10. | "Mandy" | Scott English, Richard Kerr | Turnaround (2003) | 3:17 |
| 11. | "You Raise Me Up" | Brendan Graham, Rolf Løvland, Lo Ta-yu | Face to Face (2005) | 4:00 |
| 12. | "Home" | Michael Bublé, Alan Chang, Amy Foster-Gillies | Back Home (2007) | 3:24 |
| 13. | "What About Now" (2011 remix) | Ben Moody, David Hodges, Josh Hartzler | Where We Are (2009) | 3:59 |
| 14. | "Safe" | James Grundler, John Shanks | Gravity (2010) | 3:52 |
| 15. | "Lighthouse" | Gary Barlow, Shanks | Greatest Hits (2011) | 4:23 |
| 16. | "Beautiful World" | Ruth-Anne Cunningham, Mark Feehily, Shanks | Greatest Hits | 4:02 |
| 17. | "Wide Open" | Grundler, Shanks | Greatest Hits | 3:41 |
| 18. | "Last Mile of the Way^{[a]}" | Nicky Byrne, Shane Filan, Dimitri Ehrlich, Coyle Girelli | Greatest Hits | 3:49 |

Japanese bonus track
| No. | Title | Writer(s) | Album | Length |
|---|---|---|---|---|
| 19. | "Over and Out" | Ben Earle, Craigie Dodds, John Shanks, Ruth-Anne Cunningham | Greatest Hits | 3:24 |

- Deluxe edition bonus disc

| No. | Title | Writer(s) | Album | Length |
|---|---|---|---|---|
| 1. | "Seasons in the Sun" | Jacques Brel, Rod McKuen | Westlife | 4:06 |
| 2. | "Fool Again" | Jörgen Elofsson, David Kreuger, Per Magnusson | Westlife | 3:53 |
| 3. | "What Makes a Man" | Wayne Hector, Steve Mac | Coast to Coast | 3:51 |
| 4. | "When You're Looking Like That" (single remix) | Max Martin, Andreas Carlsson, Rami Yacoub | Coast to Coast | 3:52 |
| 5. | "Bop Bop Baby" (single remix) | Shane Filan, Brian McFadden, Chris O'Brien, Graham Murphy | World of Our Own | 4:27 |
| 6. | "Unbreakable" (single remix) | Mac, Elofsson, John Reid | Unbreakable: The Greatest Hits Volume 1 (2002) | 4:32 |
| 7. | "Hey Whatever" | Hector, Mac, Ken Papenfus, Carl Papenfus | Turnaround | 3:26 |
| 8. | "Obvious" | Carlsson, Pilot, Savan Kotecha | Turnaround | 3:29 |
| 9. | "When You Tell Me That You Love Me" (with Diana Ross) | John Bettis, Albert Hammond | Face to Face | 3:55 |
| 10. | "Amazing" | Kotecha, Kristian Lundin, Pilot, Jake Schulze | Face to Face | 2:49 |
| 11. | "The Rose" | Amanda McBroom | The Love Album (2006) | 3:38 |
| 12. | "Us Against the World" | Arnthor Birgisson, Kotecha, Yacoub | Back Home | 3:59 |
| 13. | "What About Now" (live from The O2) | Ben Moody, David Hodges, Josh Hartzler | Where We Are Tour: Live from The O2 (2010) | 4:15 |
| 14. | "Uptown Girl" (live from The O2) | Billy Joel | Where We Are Tour: Live from The O2 | 3:59 |
| 15. | "Mandy" (live from The O2) | Scott English, Richard Kerr | Where We Are Tour: Live from The O2 | 3:50 |
| 16. | "Home" (live from The O2) | Michael Bublé, Alan Chang, Amy Foster-Gillies | Where We Are Tour: Live from The O2 | 3:41 |
| 17. | "Flying Without Wings" (recorded live at BBC Proms in the Park 2011) | Hector, Mac | Previously unreleased | 4:29 |
| 18. | "You Raise Me Up" (recorded live at BBC Proms in the Park 2011 with Fionnuala Sherry) | Brendan Graham, Rolf Løvland, Lo Ta-yu | Previously unreleased | 4:51 |

Deluxe edition bonus DVD
| No. | Title | Writer(s) | Producer(s) | Length |
|---|---|---|---|---|
| 1. | "Swear It Again" | Wayne Hector, Steve Mac | Steve Mac | 4:07 |
| 2. | "If I Let You Go" | Jörgen Elofsson, David Kreuger, Per Magnusson | David Kreuger, Per Magnusson | 3:39 |
| 3. | "Flying Without Wings" | Hector, Mac | Mac | 3:46 |
| 4. | "I Have a Dream" | Benny Andersson, Björn Ulvaeus | Pete Waterman, David Foster | 4:20 |
| 5. | "Seasons in the Sun" | Jacques Brel, Rod McKuen | David Foster | 4:01 |
| 6. | "Fool Again" | Jörgen Elofsson, David Kreuger, Per Magnusson | David Kreuger, Per Magnusson | 4:20 |
| 7. | "Against All Odds" (with Mariah Carey) | Phil Collins | Mariah Carey, Steve Mac | 3:20 |
| 8. | "My Love" | Elofsson, Kreuger, Magnusson, Pelle Nylén | David Kreuger, Per Magnusson | 4:14 |
| 9. | "What Makes a Man" | Wayne Hector, Steve Mac | Steve Mac | 3:49 |
| 10. | "I Lay My Love on You" | Jörgen Elofsson, Per Magnusson, David Kreuger | Per Magnusson, David Kreuger | 3:29 |
| 11. | "Uptown Girl" | Billy Joel | Mac | 4:11 |
| 12. | "When You're Looking Like That" | Max Martin, Andreas Carlsson, Rami Yacoub | Rami Yacoub | 4:00 |
| 13. | "Queen of My Heart" | Hector, Mac, John McLaughlin, Steve Robson | Mac | 4:28 |
| 14. | "World of Our Own" | Hector, Mac, Dennis Morgan, Simon Climie | Mac | 3:38 |
| 15. | "Bop Bop Baby" | Shane Filan, Brian McFadden, Chris O'Brien, Graham Murphy | Mac | 4:58 |
| 16. | "Unbreakable" | Elofsson, John Reid | Mac | 4:33 |
| 17. | "Tonight" | Steve Mac, Wayne Hector, Jorgen Elofsson | Steve Mac | 4:31 |
| 18. | "Miss You Nights" | Dave Townsend | Steve Mac | 3:12 |
| 19. | "Hey Whatever" | Hector, Mac, Ken Papenfus, Carl Papenfus | Mac | 3:35 |
| 20. | "Mandy" | Scott English, Richard Kerr | Mac | 3:17 |
| 21. | "Obvious" | Carlsson, Pilot, Savan Kotecha | Quiz & Larossi | 3:28 |
| 22. | "Ain't That a Kick in the Head" | Sammy Cahn, Jimmy Van Heusen | Mac | 2:26 |
| 23. | "Smile" | Charles Chaplin, Geoffrey Parsons, John Turner | Mac | 2:49 |
| 24. | "Angel" | Sarah McLachlan | Mac | 4:22 |
| 25. | "You Raise Me Up" | Brendan Graham, Rolf Løvland | Mac | 4:00 |
| 26. | "When You Tell Me That You Love Me" (with Diana Ross) | John Bettis, Albert Hammond | Andreas Romdhane | 4:00 |
| 27. | "Amazing" | Kotecha, Kristian Lundin, Pilot, Jake Schulze | Carl Falk | 2:55 |
| 28. | "The Rose" | Amanda McBroom | Quiz & Larossi | 3:32 |
| 29. | "Home" | Michael Bublé, Alan Chang, Amy Foster-Gillies | Mac | 3:29 |
| 30. | "Us Against the World" | Arnthor Birgisson, Kotecha, Yacoub | Arnthor Birgisson | 3:57 |
| 31. | "Something Right" | Arnthor Birgisson, Rami Yacoub, Savan Kotecha | Arnthor Birgisson, Rami Yacoub | 3:14 |
| 32. | "What About Now" | Ben Moody, David Hodges, Josh Hartzler | Steve Robson | 4:10 |
| 33. | "Safe" | James Grundler, John Shanks | John Shanks | 3:50 |
| 34. | "Swear It Again" (U.S. version) | Wayne Hector, Steve Mac | Steve Mac | 4:10 |
| 35. | "World of Our Own" (U.S. version) | Hector, Mac, Morgan, Climie | Mac | 3:34 |

- ^{^[a]} "Last Mile of the Way" or "The Last Mile of the Way".

== Charts ==
=== Weekly charts ===
| Chart (2011) | Peak position |
|---|---|
| Dutch Albums (Album Top 100) | 64 |
| German Albums (Offizielle Top 100) | 75 |
| Irish Albums (IRMA) | 1 |
| Japanese Albums (Oricon) | 75 |
| New Zealand Albums (RMNZ) | 17 |
| Norwegian Albums (VG-lista) | 31 |
| South Korean Albums (Gaon) (Deluxe version) | 15 |
| Scottish Albums (Official Charts) | 4 |
| Swedish Albums (Sverigetopplistan) | 46 |
| Swiss Albums (Schweizer Hitparade) | 96 |
| Taiwanese Albums (Five Music) | 1 |
| UK Albums (Official Charts) | 4 |

| Chart (2022) | Peak position |
|---|---|
| Irish Albums (IRMA) | 3 |

=== Monthly charts ===
| Chart (2013, 2018) | Peak position |
|---|---|
| South Korean Albums (Circle) | 83 |
| South Korean Albums (Circle) | 85 |

=== Year-end charts ===
| Chart (2011) | Position |
|---|---|
| Irish Albums (IRMA) | 9 |
| South Korean Albums (Circle) | 70 |
| UK Albums (OCC) | 19 |

| Chart (2012) | Position |
|---|---|
| UK Albums (OCC) | 143 |

| Chart (2019) | Position |
|---|---|
| Irish Albums (IRMA) | 35 |

=== Decade-end charts ===
| Chart (2010–2019) | Position |
|---|---|
| UK Albums (OCC) | 97 |

== Certifications and sales ==
| Region | Certification | Certified units/sales |
|---|---|---|
| Ireland (IRMA) | 3× Platinum | 45,000^{^} |
| New Zealand (RMNZ) | Gold | 7,500^{‡} |
| United Kingdom (BPI) | 3× Platinum | 900,000^{‡} |
^{^} Shipments figures based on certification alone.^{‡} Sales+streaming figures based on certification alone.

== Release history ==
=== Main release ===
| Country / Region | Date | Format | Label |
|---|---|---|---|
| Austria | 18 November 2011 | CD, digital download | Sony Music, RCA Records |
| Belgium | 18 November 2011 | CD, digital download | Sony Music, RCA Records |
| Germany | 18 November 2011 | CD, digital download | Sony Music, RCA Records |
| Ireland | 18 November 2011 | CD, digital download | Sony Music, RCA Records |
| Luxembourg | 18 November 2011 | CD, digital download | Sony Music, RCA Records |
| Netherlands | 18 November 2011 | CD, digital download | Sony Music, RCA Records |
| Norway | 18 November 2011 | CD, digital download | Sony Music, RCA Records |
| Singapore | 18 November 2011 | CD, digital download | Sony Music, RCA Records |
| Switzerland | 18 November 2011 | CD, digital download | Sony Music, RCA Records |
| Bulgaria | 21 November 2011 | CD, digital download | Sony Music, RCA Records |
| Canada | 21 November 2011 | CD, digital download | Sony Music, RCA Records |
| Czech Republic | 21 November 2011 | CD, digital download | Sony Music, RCA Records |
| Cyprus | 21 November 2011 | CD, digital download | Sony Music, RCA Records |
| Denmark | 21 November 2011 | CD, digital download | Sony Music, RCA Records |
| Estonia | 21 November 2011 | CD, digital download | Sony Music, RCA Records |
| Finland | 21 November 2011 | CD, digital download | Sony Music, RCA Records |
| France | 21 November 2011 | CD, digital download | Sony Music, RCA Records |
| Greece | 21 November 2011 | CD, digital download | Sony Music, RCA Records |
| Hong Kong | 21 November 2011 | CD, digital download | Sony Music, RCA Records |
| Hungary | 21 November 2011 | CD, digital download | Sony Music, RCA Records |
| Latvia | 21 November 2011 | CD, digital download | Sony Music, RCA Records |
| Lithuania | 21 November 2011 | CD, digital download | Sony Music, RCA Records |
| Poland | 21 November 2011 | CD, digital download | Sony Music, RCA Records |
| Portugal | 21 November 2011 | CD, digital download | Sony Music, RCA Records |
| Slovakia | 21 November 2011 | CD, digital download | Sony Music, RCA Records |
| Sweden | 21 November 2011 | CD, digital download | Sony Music, RCA Records |
| South Africa | 21 November 2011 | CD, digital download | Sony Music, RCA Records |
| United Kingdom | 21 November 2011 | CD, digital download | Sony Music, RCA Records |
| Italy | 22 November 2011 | CD, digital download | Sony Music, RCA Records |
| Malta | 22 November 2011 | CD, digital download | Sony Music, RCA Records |
| Mexico | 22 November 2011 | CD, digital download | Sony Music, RCA Records |
| Romania | 22 November 2011 | CD, digital download | Sony Music, RCA Records |
| Spain | 22 November 2011 | CD, digital download | Sony Music, RCA Records |
| Taiwan | 22 November 2011 | CD, digital download | Sony Music, RCA Records |
| Australia | 25 November 2011 | CD, digital download | Sony Music, RCA Records |
| New Zealand | 28 November 2011 | CD, digital download | Sony Music, RCA Records |
| Philippines | 29 November 2011 | CD, digital download | Sony Music, RCA Records |
| Japan | 6 December 2011 | CD, digital download | Sony Music, RCA Records |

=== Import release ===
| Country / Region | Date | Format | Label |
|---|---|---|---|
| Canada | 29 November 2011 | CD, Digital download | RCA Records, Sony Music |
| Japan | 29 November 2011 | CD, Digital download | RCA Records, Sony Music |
| Thailand | 29 November 2011 | CD, Digital download | RCA Records, Sony Music |
| United States | 27 December 2011 | CD, Digital download | RCA Records, Sony Music |
