= Beautiful World (Westlife song) =

Promotional single by Westlife

from the album Greatest Hits
- Released: 17 November 2011
- Recorded: 2011
- Genre: Pop rock; power pop
- Length: 4:02
- Label: Sony Music; RCA
- Songwriters: Ruth-Anne Cunningham; Mark Feehily; John Shanks
- Producer: John Shanks

Audio video
- "Beautiful World" on YouTube

"Beautiful World" is a song by Irish boy band Westlife. It was planned to be the lead single from their second compilation album, Greatest Hits (2011) but replaced by the song "Lighthouse". The song was written by Ruth-Anne Cunningham, Mark Feehily and its producer John Shanks and later released as promotional single on 17 November 2011 by Sony Music and RCA Records. The single is the group's last promotional single not under the tutelage of Simon Cowell, having left Syco and Cowell in March 2011.

== Background ==
The song chosen to be the summer single but the release was cancelled for some reasons, giving way to a November release for the first single which at the last minute was changed to "Lighthouse". "Lighthouse" was chosen by the record label instead of another new album track, "Beautiful World". It was due to be the lead single from their forthcoming compilation but at the last minute they ditched the song in favour of the latter. Mark said: "It was literally up until a day ago that we were deciding between 'Lighthouse' and 'Beautiful World' for the first single but they went with 'Lighthouse' in the end.", "It's one of the potential single track of the album", "I wasn't too gutted though. Once I write the song I've written it. You can't get too attached and just have to hand it over and forget the fact that you've written it."

== Music video ==
The music video that premiered on 15 December 2011 on their YouTube Channel, showcases their success in the last 14 years. It shows Brian McFadden on the footage, which also sees a cameo from the band's manager Louis Walsh.
