= Westlife =

Irish boy band

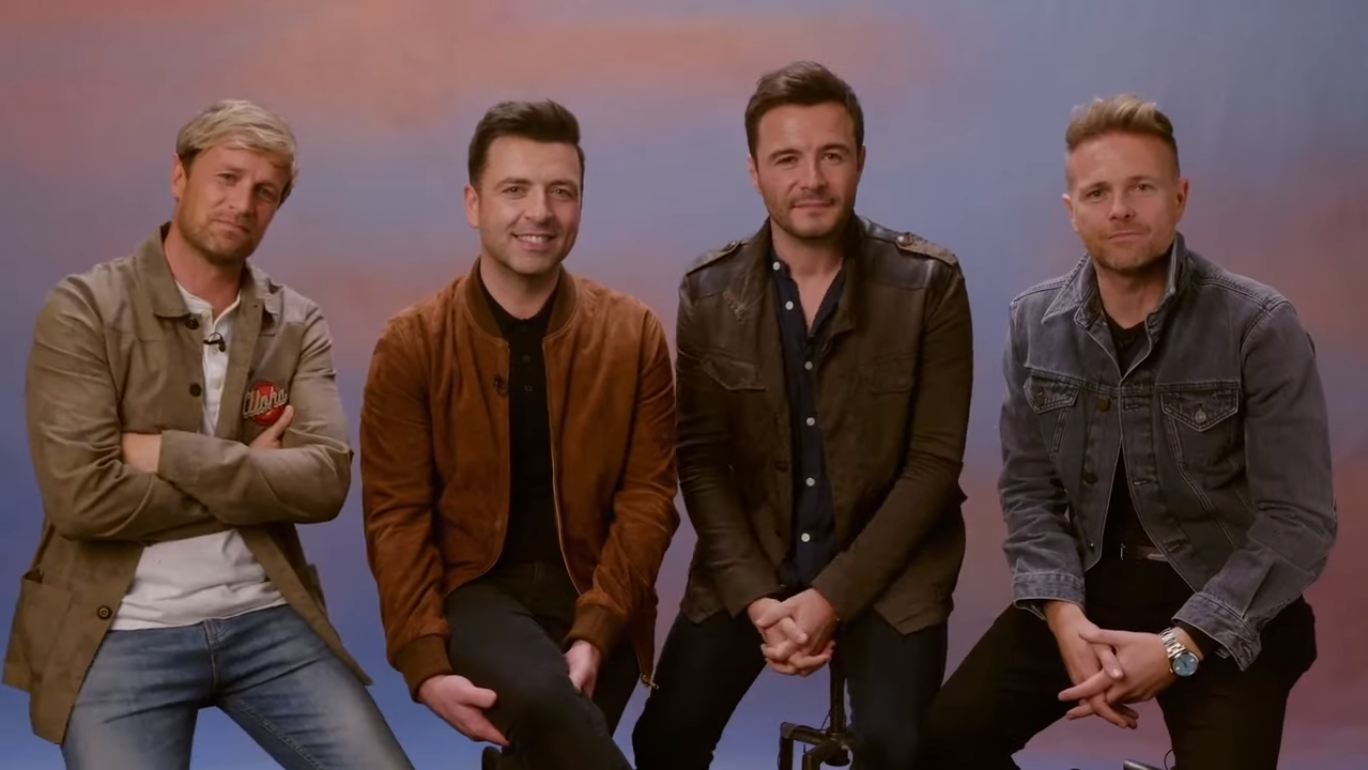
- Westlife in 2021; Left to right: Kian Egan, Mark Feehily, Shane Filan and Nicky Byrne

Background information
- Origin: Sligo and Dublin, Ireland
- Genres: Pop; dance-pop; teen pop
- Years active: 1998–2012; 2018–present
- Labels: Sony Music; BMG; RCA; Syco; Universal Music; Virgin EMI; East West; Warner Music; Tencent Music
- Members: Nicky Byrne; Kian Egan; Shane Filan; Mark Feehily
- Past members: Brian McFadden
- Website: westlife.com

Westlife are an Irish pop group formed in Sligo in 1998. The group was originally known under the names '6as1' and 'I.O.YOU' with several other members. Westlife consists of members Nicky Byrne, Shane Filan, Kian Egan and Mark Feehily. Brian McFadden was a member of the band before leaving to pursue a solo career in March 2004. Mark Feehily is a member, but is temporarily away from the group due to health issues. The group disbanded in 2012 and later reunited in 2018.

In Ireland and United Kingdom, the group has 11 number-one albums, 16 number-one singles, and 34 Top 50 singles. They have sold over 55 million records and are holders of four Guinness World Records. Westlife has received numerous accolades including one World Music Award, two Brit Awards, four MTV Awards, and four Record of the Year Awards. As of November 2026 they were certified for 10.4 million singles, 12.56 million albums and 1.525 million music DVDs. That is a total of 24.485 million certified sales in the UK only.

The group has released twelve studio albums: four as a five-piece and eight as a four-piece. They rose to fame with their debut international self-titled studio album, Westlife (1999). It was followed by Coast to Coast (2000), World of Our Own (2001), and Turnaround (2003). Following the departure of McFadden, the group released the cover albums ...Allow Us to Be Frank (2004) and The Love Album (2006), the albums Face to Face (2005), Back Home (2007), Where We Are (2009), and Gravity (2010), followed by a six-year split. After reforming in 2018, the quartet released the studio albums Spectrum (2019) and Wild Dreams (2021). The group had three major compilation album releases as well: Unbreakable – The Greatest Hits Volume 1 (2002), Greatest Hits (2011), and 25: The Ultimate Collection (2026). The band are currently operating as a trio with Filan, Byrne and Egan as Feehily is currently taking an extended break due to multiple bouts of illness since 2022.

== History ==
=== Formation and early years (1997–1998) ===
Kian Egan, Mark Feehily, and Shane Filan, all schoolmates at Summerhill College in Sligo, Ireland, participated in a school production of Grease with fellow Sligo men Derrick Lacey, Graham Keighron, and Michael Garrett. The sextet formed a pop vocal group called Six as One in 1997, later renamed IOYOU. The group, managed by choreographer Mary McDonagh and two other informal managers, released a single titled "Together Girl Forever" and "Everlasting Love" under Sound Records. McDonagh first encountered Egan as a six-year-old student at her weekly dance classes and came to know Filan and Feehily in their early teens as they starred in shows such as Oliver! and Godspell for Sligo Fun Company.

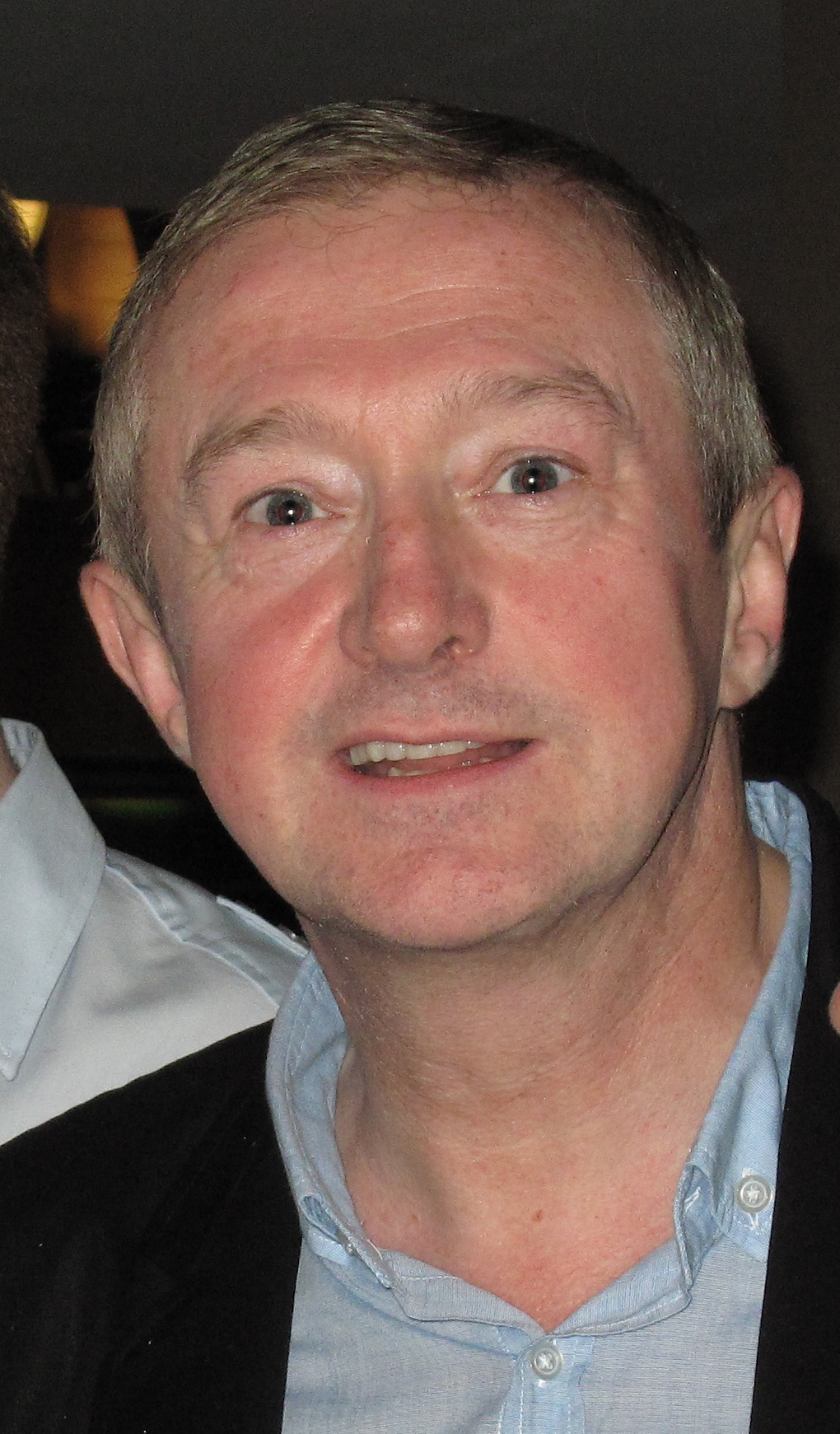
Westlife are managed by Louis Walsh.

Westlife were originally signed by Simon Cowell.

Louis Walsh, the manager of fellow Irish boy band Boyzone, came to know the group after Filan's mother Mae contacted him, but the group failed to secure a BMG record deal with Simon Cowell. Cowell told Walsh: "You are going to have to fire at least three of them. They have great voices, but they are the ugliest band I have ever seen in my life." Lacey, Keighron, and Garrett were told they would not be part of the new group, and auditions were held in Dublin where Nicky Byrne and Brian McFadden were recruited.

The new group, formed on 3 July 1998, was originally named Westside but renamed themselves as Westlife due to an existing band with that name. They signed a four-million-pound record deal with RCA Records. Westlife's first big break came in 1998 when they opened for Boyzone and Backstreet Boys' concerts in Dublin. Boyzone singer Ronan Keating was brought in to co-manage the group with Louis Walsh. Their first live television performance as a group was on the Irish TV series The Late Late Show broadcast on 13 November 1998. They performed "Flying Without Wings".

=== Westlife, Coast to Coast, and World of Our Own (1999–2001) ===
In April 1999, the group released their first single, "Swear It Again", which immediately topped the charts in Ireland and in the UK for two weeks. It was the biggest-selling single in the first week by a debut artist. Their second single, "If I Let You Go" was released in August 1999, which made them the first boy band to hit No. 1 with their first two singles. Their third single, "Flying Without Wings" (their first 'Record of the Year' and their third No. 1 single), was released in October of the same year. "Flying Without Wings" was also included on the soundtrack of the Warner Brothers film Pokémon: The Movie 2000. Their first album, simply titled Westlife, was released in November 1999 and went to No. 2 in the UK and No. 1 in Ireland. The album was the biggest chart dropper on the Top 40 in UK music history when in its 58th week on the charts it leaped from No. 79 to No. 3 before falling to No. 37 the following week. In Scotland, the album debuted at number 6 in 1999 but subsequently peaked at number one in 2001. This year, they also started their own promotional tour outside the UK and Ireland in Finland, Germany, Indonesia, Malaysia, Netherlands, and Sweden.

In December 1999, a fourth single was released, the double A-side "I Have A Dream"/"Seasons in the Sun". It was the 1999 UK Christmas number-one single and their fourth No. 1 single. They are one of only five acts to achieve four number ones in the UK Singles Chart in one calendar year. The fifth and final single from the album, "Fool Again", also peaked at No. 1. They became the only male band to have every single released from an album reach No. 1 in the UK. Afterward, Westlife signed to Arista Records for the North American release of their debut. On 1 July 2000, they were honored as Freemen of the Borough of Sligo. An honor given to people who have promoted the town and county of Sligo, Ireland.

Coast to Coast, their second album, was released a year later and was their first No. 1 UK album, beating the Spice Girls' Forever album by a large margin; the chart battle was widely reported by British media. It became the country's 4th biggest-selling album of 2000. This is their second No. 1 album in Ireland. The album was preceded by the duet with Mariah Carey "Against All Odds" and the original song "My Love" (their second Record of the Year award). Both singles reached No. 1 on the UK charts, their sixth and seventh number ones respectively. With this, Westlife broke the record of the most consecutive No. 1 singles in the UK with their first seven singles. However, in December 2000, their eighth single "What Makes a Man", debuted at No. 2, breaking their string of consecutive number ones. The single "My Love" was controversially used by the Central Intelligence Agency (CIA) as part of a torture program in Afghanistan. According to the American Civil Liberties Union (ACLU), "the music pounded constantly as part of a scheme to assault prisoners' senses".

Outside the UK and Ireland, they gained chart success with "I Lay My Love on You" and "When You're Looking Like That". They were included in the top ten earners list of all acts in the UK and Ireland and sold over 2.5 million units in the Asia Pacific region. In February 2001, they began their first world tour, "Where Dreams Come True Tour". A recording of a concert from the tour live from Dublin was released on 19 November 2001. Aside from their biggest concert tour dates and venues at that time, they went to Italy, Mexico, and Vatican City for promotional tour.

On 12 November 2001, Westlife released their third album, World of Our Own, peaking at No. 1 in the UK and Ireland. "Uptown Girl" (their first single to be on the List of million-selling singles in the United Kingdom), "Queen of My Heart" and "World of Our Own" were released as singles, all of which peaked at No. 1 in the UK. "Bop Bop Baby" was also released as a single and peaked at No. 5 in the UK. In 2002, Westlife went on their second world tour, the World of Our Own Tour. By the end of the year, IRMA awarded the band for 1 million units sold in Ireland. The group sold more than 12 million records in a span of three years.

Despite massive success overseas with their three albums, Westlife were unable to break into the North American market. Although "Swear It Again" charted at No. 20 on the Billboard Hot 100, an appearance on MTV's Total Request Live, and Arista releasing a North American edition of their debut album, all attempts flopped. In 2002, RCA Records tried to promote and release a remix of "World of Our Own" to the States, but was unsuccessful. Billboard attributed Westlife's blacklist to corporate politics, citing market oversaturation as two American boybands: Backstreet Boys and *NSYNC, went on hiatus that same year. When asked about it in 2003, Nicky Byrne stated:

"We sent over a CD of World of Our Own with no name on it. They didn't know it was Westlife and every single radio station in the States all came back and said that this is an absolutely huge hit. [...] But as soon as we revealed it was Westlife, the radio pluggers all went, 'Whoa, not Westlife – it's a boyband.' And we cannot break that down, no matter what song we come out with. The problem with America is that it's all radio and you've got to break into radio first, and currently radio doesn't want to play boy bands or pop music. If Bono wrote a song with us tomorrow and it was the biggest hit in the world, [and] if Westlife's name is put to it, it won't be a hit in America because radio will not play us."

— Nicky Byrne, 8 July 2003 interview

=== Unbreakable, Turnaround, and McFadden's departure (2002–2004) ===
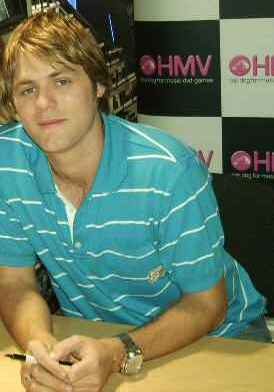
Brian McFadden left Westlife in March 2004.

Westlife released their eleventh UK No. 1 single, "Unbreakable" in 2002. Amidst rumors of a split, Westlife released their first greatest hits album in November of that same year titled Unbreakable – The Greatest Hits Vol. 1, which peaked at No. 1 in the UK and Ireland. During this time, Westlife achieved a Guinness World Record for most public appearances by a pop group in 36 hours. The band made stop-offs in five different cities (Dublin, Belfast, Edinburgh, London, and Manchester) to promote their then-new album. They also continued their promotions in California and France. The release was followed by the double A-side single "Tonight"/"Miss You Nights", which debuted at No. 3 in the UK and No. 1 in Ireland. Following this release, the group premiered a TV documentary titled "Wild Westlife". Iain MacDonald directed it and features their daily life as musicians and their tour experiences. It was aired on BBC Choice. In 2003, Westlife went on their third world tour, the Unbreakable Tour. A recording of a concert from the tour in Manchester was released in November 2003. Then went on to have promo for the first time in Austria and India.

In September 2003, Westlife released "Hey Whatever", which peaked at No. 4 in the UK. Their fourth studio album, Turnaround, was released in November 2003, earning the group another No. 1 album in the UK and Ireland. "Mandy", was released a week before the album and became the band's twelfth No. 1 single. It also won them their third Record of the Year award. "Mandy" is the single with the longest leap to the top (from No. 200 to No. 1) in UK music history. "Obvious" was released as the final single from the album, charting at No. 3.

On 9 March 2004, just three weeks before embarking on their fourth world tour, McFadden left the group, citing a desire to spend more time with his family. McFadden's final public performance as part of Westlife was at Newcastle upon Tyne's Powerhouse nightclub on 27 February 2004. He subsequently began a solo career, and reverted the spelling of his first name back to its original 'Brian'.

Less than a month after McFadden's departure, the group began their Turnaround Tour. A recording of a concert from the Turnaround Tour, live from Stockholm, Sweden, was released in November 2004.

=== Face to Face, Back Home, and cover albums (2004–2008) ===
In September 2004, they performed at the World Music Awards, where they were recognized as the Best Irish Act of that year. They then released a Rat Pack-inspired album, their fifth album ...Allow Us to Be Frank, which peaked at number 3. No singles from this album were released in the UK, but the track "Ain't That a Kick in the Head?" had a music video produced and was released as a physical single in other European countries. "Smile" and "Fly Me to the Moon" also had music videos produced. Prior to the release of the ...Allow Us to Be Frank album, Westlife scouted for "the perfect fan" to help promote the album. After X Factor-style auditions, they found Joanne Hindley, who recorded "The Way You Look Tonight" with the group. A television program documenting this process, She's The One, was presented by Kate Thornton. Westlife embarked on "The Number Ones Tour" in early 2005. A recording of a concert from the tour, live from Sheffield, was released in November 2005.

In October 2005, Westlife released the single "You Raise Me Up", which became their thirteenth number 1 single. It was taken from their sixth album Face to Face which also peaked at No. 1 in the UK. "You Raise Me Up" was awarded as their fourth Record of the Year in the UK. In December of that year, the group released "When You Tell Me That You Love Me", a duet with Diana Ross, as the second single. It debuted and peaked at No. 2. The third single from the album, "Amazing", peaked at No. 4. Westlife embarked on the "Face to Face Tour", traveling extensively to the UK, Ireland, Australia, and Asia. The group performed 32 shows and recorded 238,718 attendances. A recording of a concert from the tour, live from Wembley Arena, was released in November 2006.

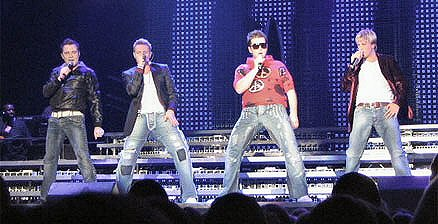
Westlife on their 2006 concert tour

In late 2006, Westlife signed a new five-album deal with Sony BMG Music Entertainment. Their seventh album, The Love Album was a concept album that consisted of popular love song covers. The album debuted at No. 1 in both the UK and Ireland. It was the top-selling album of 2006 in Ireland. The only single from The Love Album, "The Rose", became their 14th UK No. 1 single. Westlife kicked off their eighth world tour, "The Love Tour", in Perth, Australia. The group then went on to other Australian cities before moving on to South Africa, the UK, and Ireland. The tour grossed £1,031,033.

On 5 November 2007, Westlife released their eighth album, Back Home, which contained nine new original songs and three cover songs. The album debuted at No. 1 in the UK and Ireland. It was also 2007's fifth biggest-selling album in the UK. The first single released from the album was "Home", which peaked at No. 3 in the UK. "Us Against the World" was released as the second single and "Something Right" became the third single in Europe and the Asia Pacific region. On 15 December 2007, they premiered a two-hour show called The Westlife Show where they performed 10 of their songs, hosted by Holly Willoughby. They embarked on the Back Home Tour on 25 February 2008. This tour marked the first time that the group had traveled and performed in New Zealand, performing four sold-out shows in Auckland, Wellington, New Plymouth, and Christchurch. Westlife were the seventh top touring act of 2008.

=== 10th anniversary, hiatus, Where We Are, and Gravity (2008–2010) ===
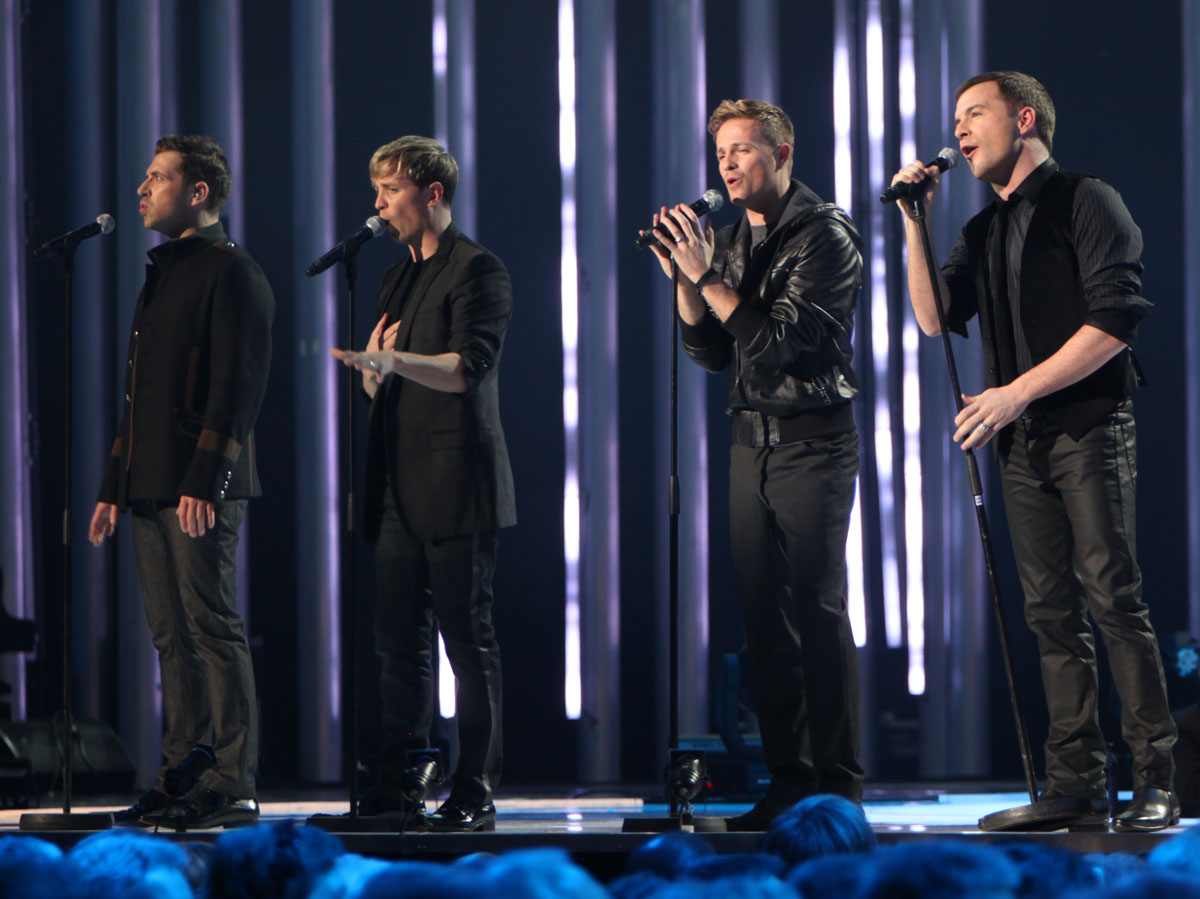
Westlife performing at the Nobel Peace Prize Concert in 2009

To mark their tenth year in music, Westlife staged the sold-out concert 10 Years of Westlife in Croke Park on 1 June 2008. The group announced that they would be going on hiatus for a year after their Back Home Tour.10 Years of Westlife – Live at Croke Park Stadium was released on 24 November 2008 and went straight to No. 1 on the UK, Ireland, South Africa, Hong Kong, and New Zealand Music DVD charts. On 13 December 2008, while on hiatus, Westlife made an unexpected appearance during that year's X Factor final where they performed "Flying Without Wings" with runners-up JLS. In the last week of January 2009, a DVD titled The Karaoke Collection was released. On 18 March 2009, Westlife won the Best Irish Pop Act at the 2009 Meteor Awards for the ninth consecutive time.

Their tenth album, Where We Are, was released on 30 November 2009 in the UK and peaked at No. 2 on both Irish and UK Albums Charts. The lead single, "What About Now", was released on 23 October 2009 and peaked at No. 2 on both Irish and UK Singles Charts. The tour in support of this album was "The Where We Are Tour". A recording of a concert from the tour, live from London, was released in November 2010. They were part of the Haiti charity single in early 2010 with "Everybody Hurts", which was organized by Cowell. The single peaked at No. 1 on both Irish and UK Singles Charts. That year, the Guinness Book of World Records announced that Westlife was the top-selling album group of the 21st century, with 10.74 million albums sold in the UK alone.

On 14 November 2010, the single "Safe" was released. It debuted on the UK Singles Chart on 21 November at No. 10. The album Gravity was released on 22 November 2010. It was entirely produced by John Shanks. The album went to No. 1 in Ireland and No. 3 in the UK. This is their ninth No. 1 in Ireland; this album made Westlife one of the few musical acts to have number-one albums in three consecutive decades (1990s, 2000s, 2010s) in their home country.

=== Greatest Hits and split (2011–2012) ===
In March 2011, they began their eleventh major concert tour, the Gravity Tour. This tour marked the first time the group traveled to Oman, Namibia, Guangzhou, and Vietnam for concerts. As of 2011, the group was the longest-reigning band and second-longest-reigning number-one music act in the 21st century in the UK. On 14 March 2011, Westlife confirmed that they had left Cowell after 13 years and his record label Syco Music after nine years. Byrne said of Cowell: "he got so busy [...] and we needed someone who was on it all the time."

After going back to RCA Records full-time for a one-year album contract, they announced their Greatest Hits album would be released on 21 November 2011. It debuted at No. 1 in Ireland and No. 4 in the UK. The first single, "Lighthouse", was released in November 2011. A follow-up promotional single, "Beautiful World" was released the same month. The Greatest Hits Tour was announced on 18 October 2011, with dates in the UK confirmed for May 2012. Stereoboard reported that the tour sold out within minutes. The farewell tour consisted of eight dates in China and 33 in the UK and Ireland; in total, the band sold 489,694 tickets from the tour. On 19 October 2011, Westlife officially announced they were splitting following the tour.

ITV commissioned a one-off music event titled Westlife: For the Last Time. Another show, The Westlife Show: Live, was broadcast on 1 November 2011. Following this, they were guests on The Late Late Show. They were honored at that time by the Scottish Exhibition and Conference Centre (SECC) with four specially commissioned bar stools to mark 49 performances at the venue for over 380,000 fans, selling more tickets than any other act. The band had their final concert on 23 June 2012 at Croke Park Stadium in Ireland. The 82,300-capacity show was sold out in 4 minutes. Due to this popular demand, an extra date was added at Croke Park on 22 June 2012, which also sold out. Combined, there was a total of 187,808 spectators on both nights, exceeding the stadium's capacity. Their last concert was screened live in more than 300 cinemas in the United Kingdom, and 200 cinemas worldwide. They released a DVD of the show, which went to number 1 in both UK and Irish charts. That year they were the 34th top-grossing tour act with earnings of $35.2 million (€27 million). Following the split, all four members released albums and singles individually.

=== Reunion, Spectrum, and tour (2018–2020) ===
On 23 September 2018, it was reported that the group was signed to Universal Music Group for a new five-year album and tour deal with Virgin EMI Records. On 3 October 2018, the group formally announced that they were working on new music. McFadden was not involved in the reformation, saying in an interview with Closer Magazine, "I only met the guys when I joined the band and have no regrets about leaving." On 19 December 2018, Egan and Feehily posted a picture of the group's first rehearsals together in six years.

"Hello My Love", their first single since 2011 was released on 10 January 2019. Their first UK performance in seven years and of the single was on The Graham Norton Show on 11 January 2019. They also performed the single on the 24th National Television Awards on 22 January 2019. Their first Irish performance and television appearance together was on the final night of Dancing With the Stars Ireland on 24 March 2019. The single peaked at number 13 in the UK and reached number two in Ireland and Scotland. The single was certified Gold in the UK seven months after its premiere. In Ireland, it has a 2× Platinum certification.

Their eleventh studio album, Spectrum, was released on 15 November 2019. The album peaked at number one in Ireland, Scotland, and the UK. It was certified Gold in the UK and Platinum in Ireland. The second single from the album was "Better Man". It reached number two on the UK Singles Sales Chart and Scottish Singles Chart. The third single, "Dynamite", was released on 5 July 2019. The fourth single from the album, "My Blood", was released on 25 October 2019. "My Blood" peaked at number ninety-six on the UK Singles Chart and at number six on the Scottish Singles Chart. It also peaked at number forty-six in the Irish Singles Chart.

On 17 October 2018, Westlife announced The Twenty Tour and said: "Every country that wants to see Westlife will see us at some point. We won't step away from this until we've managed to tour the world." The second day of the tour in Croke Park had a live film broadcast in selected cinemas on 6 July 2019. This was released in a video album in different formats on 13 March 2020. It reached number 1 in the UK and Ireland and stayed at the top spot for more than thirty weeks on their official charts.

On 13 September 2019, they announced the Stadiums in the Summer Tour, which was scheduled to begin the following year. However, it was postponed until 2022 due to the COVID-19 pandemic.

=== Wild Dreams, Feehily's temporary departure, 25: The Ultimate Collection (2021–present) ===
Interview with Westlife in 2021

On 17 March 2021, they formally announced that they signed a new album deal through Warner Music UK and East West Records. They performed at a BBC Radio 2 event in Ulster Hall, Belfast, on 25 August 2021, which was broadcast on 10 September 2021.

"Starlight", the lead single from their twelfth studio album, was released on 14 October 2021. The album, Wild Dreams, was released on 26 November 2021.

On 29 October 2021, a new schedule for their renamed fourteenth concert tour, The Wild Dreams Tour, was released. It included fourteen new dates and venues, with eight more dates added later. They announced that their Wembley Stadium date would be streamed live in various European cinemas. On 17 December 2021, a Westlife concert filmed at London's Bush Hall Venue and broadcast by Tencent's WeChat (Weixin) in China had an audience of almost 28 million. They were special guest performers on the Backstreet Boys livestream concert on the same platform on 24 June 2022.

On 14 August 2023, Westlife announced their first-ever tour dates in Brazil, Canada and the United States. They performed in Toronto, Boston, New York City, and Chicago in March 2024.

On 28 February 2024, Feehily announced his temporary departure from Westlife due to ongoing health issues, just days before the start of their American tour, leaving Filan, Byrne, and Egan to continue the tour as a trio. On 12 April 2024, Westlife announced their fifteenth concert tour, With Love Tour which were twelve Asian dates from 24 May 2024 to 23 November 2024.

On 16 July 2024, Music Week reported that Westlife had collaborated with Tencent Music for a one-time AI single named "Love + Courage", only released in China and a non-album single. The song is a cover of a Chinese artist, Johnny Zhang. It had a million streams on its first week on the said country.

On 13 June 2025, the pop trio kicked off the announcement of their initial dates and venue for their sixteenth concert tour, The 25th Anniversary World Tour, which is in London's Royal Albert Hall. On 11 July 2025, Sheeran invited the group to perform with him on stage in his Ipswich gig, in which they played Flying Without Wings. On 17 October 2025, Belfast and Dublin dates were announced with the new single called "Chariot" announced and later released on 24 October 2025 under Sony Music. The song is written by Sheeran, Mac, Will Reynolds, and Johnny McDaid of Snow Patrol. The trio announced more concert tour dates later that includes more European dates. This tour marks their first gigs in Antwerp and Paris, and also for venues Barclays Arena, Lanxess Arena, Royal Arena, and Ziggo Dome. On the same day, they revealed a greatest hits album called 25: The Ultimate Collection, which contains their hits as well as "Chariot" and three newly-recorded tracks and was released on 8 May 2026. It was preceded by a single, "Your Love Amazes Me", on 17 April 2026. Despite his current absence from touring, Feehily recorded vocals for the new tracks. The official album cover featured McFadden, despite his having left the group in 2004.

== Public image and endorsements ==
Westlife's debut album and single coincided with the apogee of boy band popularity. They also had album certifications in Brazil, Mexico, the Philippines, and the United States. They had over 50,000 official fan club members in mainland China alone in 2006. In 2009, "Flying Without Wings" was listed as the seventh most popular song for the first dance at weddings in the UK. In 2012, their version of "You Raise Me" and also "Flying Without Wings" made it to the top 20 most popular songs used at funerals. In 2016, three of their songs ("I'll See You Again", "Flying Without Wings", and "You Raise Me Up") made it on the top pop music choices for funerals in Ireland.

The band performed for the Sultan of Brunei and was paid £2.5 million to play a private concert of seven songs. They also performed at the Nobel Peace Prize Concert in 2000, 2005, and 2009. They also played for Queen Elizabeth II twice, Barack Obama and for Pope John Paul II. They were the first ever pop band to top the entertainment bill at the Vatican City and a private concert for the Pope.

Their second studio album Coast to Coast received additional products, mostly in Asia, that included MRT transport ticket, picture card calendar, postcard set, signed fold-out poster, glossy slipcase and Filofax. They received sponsorship from Tayto in 2000 and for their concert tours from Calvin Klein in 2001, Adidas in 2002, and Volkswagen in 2011. A book written by the members of Westlife was released on 16 June 2008 by HarperCollins UK Publishing titled Westlife: Our Story, as part of their 10th-year celebration. The band released two perfume gift sets, "X" and "With Love".

=== Charitable support ===
The group has supported various charitable causes. They were involved in the "Helping For Haiti" charity single, which was released in February 2010, and released a cover version of "Uptown Girl" for Comic Relief.

They have participated in a Royal British Legion poppy appeal, Irish Blood for Life 2004 and did an advertisement for Galway's Irish Water Safety campaign. They also lent their support to the Irish Blood Transfusion Service (IBTS). On 4 November 2005, they performed with other music artists at the Coca-Cola Dome in Johannesburg, South Africa, for The "Unite of the Stars" Gala Banquet charity concert that supports four charities: the Nelson Mandela Children's Fund, Unite Against Hunger, St. Mary's Hospital and the Topsy Foundation. They also performed live for charity on Sport Relief, Macmillan Cancer Support, Croí, Western Alzheimer's, O'Dwyer Cheshire Home, Mayo Cancer Support Group, Marie Keating Foundation, Outward Bound Trust, ChildLine, Children in Need, and Sheffield's Children Hospital. They had also helped for auctions on Meningitis Research Foundation, Carlton Celebrity Auction for Centrepoint (for the homeless), the National Society for the Prevention of Cruelty to Children, The Samaritans, Zutto charity painting, and Pushing The Envelope (for National Literacy Trust). They have also been involved with the following organizations: Royal National Institute for the Deaf (RNID), Cancer Research UK, United Nations' World Food Programme (WFP), Muscle Help Foundation, Global Breast Cancer Awareness Campaign, and Real Man campaign. They are also included as ambassadors of the Irish Society for the Prevention of Cruelty to Children (ISPCC).

== Members ==
=== Current ===
- Shane Filan (1998–2012, 2018–present)
- Nicky Byrne (1998–2012, 2018–present)
- Kian Egan (1998–2012, 2018–present)
- Mark Feehily (1998–2012, 2018–present; on hiatus)

=== Former ===
- Brian McFadden (1998–2004)

== Discography ==
- Westlife (1999)
- Coast to Coast (2000)
- World of Our Own (2001)
- Turnaround (2003)
- ...Allow Us to Be Frank (2004)
- Face to Face (2005)
- The Love Album (2006)
- Back Home (2007)
- Where We Are (2009)
- Gravity (2010)
- Spectrum (2019)
- Wild Dreams (2021)

== Tours ==
=== Concert tours ===
Headlining

- East Meets Westlife Tour (2000)
- Where Dreams Come True Tour (2001)
- World of Our Own Tour (2002)
- Unbreakable Tour (2003)
- Turnaround Tour (2004)
- Number Ones Tour (2005)
- Face to Face Tour (2006)
- The Love Tour (2007)
- Back Home Tour (2008)
- Where We Are Tour (2010)
- Gravity Tour (2011)
- The Greatest Hits Tour (2012)
- The Twenty Tour (2019)
- The Wild Dreams Tour or The Hits Tour or With Love Tour (2022–2024)
- The 25th Anniversary World Tour (2025–2027)

Supporting

- Backstreet Boys - (1998, 2 dates)
- Boyzone – Where We Belong Tour, Greatest Hits Tour (1998-1999, 26 dates)

=== Promotional tours ===
- 1998–2012; 2018–present UK and Ireland Tour
- 1999 European, East Asian, and Southeast Asian Tour
- 2000 European, North American, South American and Asian Tour
- 2001, 2002 European, Korean, Mexican and United States Tour
- 2003 European, Hong Kong, Japan, and Malaysian Tour
- 2005, 2006 European, Taiwan Tour
- 2007 Australian Tour
- 2009 Swedish Tour
- 2019 Singapore, Indonesian, Chinese, Swedish Tour

== See also ==
- List of best-selling boy bands
- UK Singles Chart records and statistics
- List of artists who reached number one on the UK Singles Chart
- List of best-selling music artists in the United Kingdom in singles sales
- List of artists by number of UK Singles Chart number ones
- List of UK Singles Chart number ones of the 2000s
- List of UK Singles Downloads Chart number ones of the 2000s
- List of UK Albums Chart number ones of the 2000s
- List of artists who reached number one in Ireland
- List of songs that reached number one on the Irish Singles Chart
- List of best-selling albums in the Philippines
