= John Shanks =

American record producer, songwriter and guitarist (born 1964)

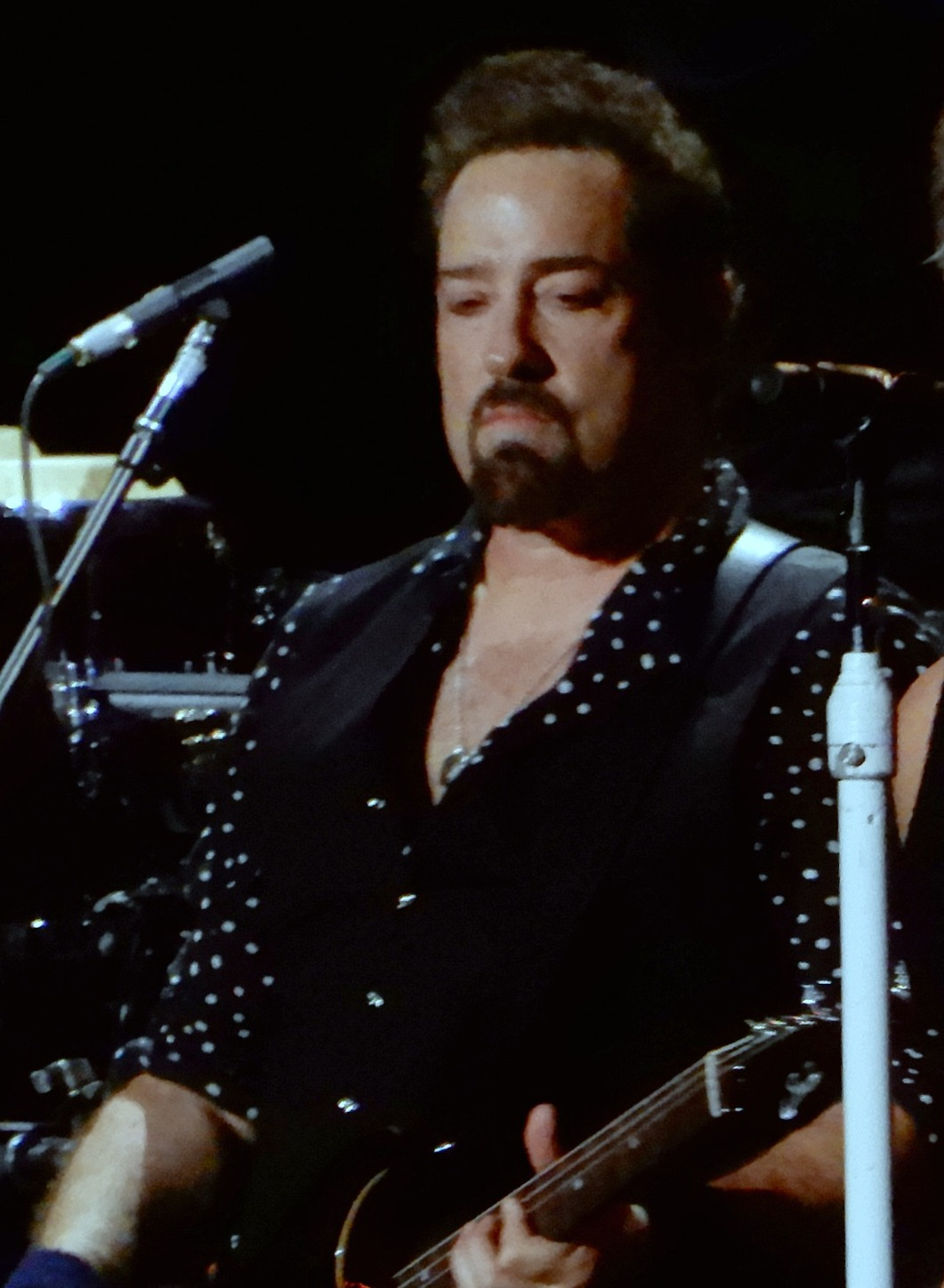
- Shanks performing with Bon Jovi in 2017

Background information
- Born: John Matthew Shanks; December 18, 1964 (age 61); New York City, U.S.
- Origin: Los Angeles County, California, U.S.
- Genres: Rock; alternative rock; country rock; pop rock
- Occupations: Songwriter; record producer; musician
- Instruments: Guitar
- Years active: 1988–present
- Member of: Bon Jovi
- Website: johnshanks.com

John Matthew Shanks (born December 18, 1964) is an American songwriter, record producer, and guitarist. He has been the rhythm guitarist of the rock band Bon Jovi since 2024, having served as a producer and session and touring musician for the band since 2004.

== Early life ==
Shanks was born in New York City and moved to Los Angeles when he was 17 years old. He was in a band called "Line One" with jazz saxophonist Boney James. Novelist Bret Easton Ellis, who played music when younger, was also in the band, according to Ellis.

== Career ==
Shanks began playing in Melissa Etheridge's band in 1988 and toured with her for several years. Shanks enjoyed his first writing success in the early 1990s with tracks for Bonnie Raitt, Joe Cocker and Tuck & Patti. He also landed his first publishing deal.

Shanks reunited with Etheridge in 1995 when he collaborated with her on songs for Your Little Secret. He worked with her for several years and co-produced her subsequent album, Breakdown, in 1999. Breakdown received four Grammy nominations, including Best Rock Song and Best Rock Album.

In 2001, Shanks produced several tracks for the Stevie Nicks album Trouble in Shangri-La and co-wrote the first single, "Every Day", with Damon Johnson.

In January 2001, Shanks began working with Michelle Branch. Together, they wrote four songs for the hit album The Spirit Room, including the first single, "Everywhere". He also produced the album. In the fall of the same year, Shanks co-wrote Sheryl Crow's single, "Steve McQueen".

Shanks started working with Take That in 2006, on their comeback album Beautiful World, and he also produced their next album The Circus in 2008.

Shanks has also produced or written for other projects with Carlos Santana, Celine Dion, Sting, The Corrs, Chris Isaak, Hilary Duff, Keith Urban, and Alanis Morissette. He produced Ashlee Simpson's hit 2004 album Autobiography and is credited with co-writing ten of the album's 12 songs with Simpson. On seven of those, Kara DioGuardi is also credited. That same year, Shanks produced three songs for Kelly Clarkson's hit album Breakaway, including the title track "Breakaway", and worked with Anastacia on two songs for her self-titled album, including the single "Welcome To My Truth".

Shanks won the Grammy Award for Producer of the Year, Non-Classical in 2005 for his work on Autobiography, the Kelly Clarkson song "Breakaway", Hilary Duff's "Fly", Robbie Robertson's "Shine Your Light" and Alanis Morissette's album So-Called Chaos. Clive Davis described Shanks as “the father of that guitar-driven kind of pop sound”, as his work with Branch, Clarkson, Duff and Simpson employed many acoustic guitars in contrast to the synthesizer-heavy sound of the pop music of the period.

In 2005, Shanks regrouped with Ashlee Simpson, producing her second album, I Am Me, and co-writing all of its eleven songs with Simpson and DioGuardi. Shanks also worked on two major albums of 2005, the Backstreet Boys' Never Gone and Bon Jovi's ninth album, Have a Nice Day. In 2007, Shanks also worked to produce the Bon Jovi's tenth album, Lost Highway, and in 2009 he also worked and produced on Bon Jovi's eleventh album, The Circle.

In 2010 and 2011, Shanks collaborated with Irish vocal group Westlife with their albums Gravity and Greatest Hits where it charted at the top of UK and Irish Albums Charts. He also produced (with Steve Robson), Everybody Hurts a charity single for Helping Haiti.

In January 2011, Shanks stated that he began work with rock band Van Halen on its first album with original lead singer David Lee Roth since the landmark LP 1984 (1984). Released in February 2012, Van Halen's A Different Kind of Truth debuted at #2 in the United States, and in the Top 10 on five continents. In 2013, Shanks produced Bon Jovi's twelfth album, What About Now.

In 2014, he produced Anthony Jasmin's EP Stick Together and also worked on Take That's album III. In 2015, Shanks with Jon Bon Jovi produced Bon Jovi's thirteenth studio album Burning Bridges and also performed as lead guitarist for the entire album.

Shanks produced Bon Jovi's fourteenth album, This House Is Not for Sale, and became the touring rhythm guitarist for Bon Jovi in 2016 to support the band's This House Is Not for Sale Tour.

== Personal life ==
Shanks has owned several guitars over the years; including a 1960 Gibson Les Paul Standard that was the basis for the Gibson Custom Shop Collector's Choice #7 "Shanks" reissue. He has been married to Colleen Coffey since September 10, 1994. They have two sons together.

== Songwriting discography ==
- Safe by Westlife
- Closer by Westlife
- Tell Me It's Love by Westlife
- I Get Weak by Westlife
- No One's Gonna Sleep Tonight by Westlife
- Difference in Me by Westlife
- Too Hard To Say Goodbye by Westlife
- Lighthouse by Westlife
- Beautiful World by Westlife
- Over and Out by Westlife
- Wide Open by Westlife
- Poet's Heart by Westlife
- Portrait by Cardiknox
- White Light by The Corrs
- Amazing by Take That
- Beautiful Morning by Take That
- Butterfly by Take That
- Do It All for Love by Take That
- Hold On by Take That
- I Like It by Take That
- Like I Never Loved You At All by Take That
- Patience by Take That
- Reach Out by Take That
- Stay Together by Take That
- Trouble With Me by Take That
- We Love to Entertain You by Take That
- Almost Home by Alex & Sierra
- Here We Go by Alex & Sierra
- 6th Avenue by Gary Barlow
- Face to Face by Gary Barlow and featuring Elton John
- This House by Gary Barlow
- Chapman Square by Lawson
- Feels Like Home by Sheryl Crow
- Real Gone by Sheryl Crow for the movie Cars
- Magnetic by Goo Goo Dolls
- What About Now by Bon Jovi
- Child of the Universe by Delta Goodrem (2012)
- Every Day by Stevie Nicks
- Somebody's Me by Enrique Iglesias
- Somebody Like You by Keith Urban
- Come Clean by Hilary Duff (2004)
- Back to Your Heart by Delta Goodrem (2023)

== Production discography ==
- Child of the Universe by Delta Goodrem
- Love Thy Will Be Done by Delta Goodrem
- The Spirit Room by Michelle Branch
- Go by Vertical Horizon
- If the World Turned Upside Down by Goo Goo Dolls
- Beautiful Day by Jon Bon Jovi
- The Spirit Indestructible by Nelly Furtado
- Autobiography by Ashlee Simpson
- I Am Me by Ashlee Simpson
- Hilary Duff by Hilary Duff
- A Different Kind of Truth by Van Halen
- Gravity by Westlife
- Greatest Hits by Westlife
- Everybody Hurts by Various Artists
- Beautiful World by Take That
- The Circus by Take That
- Daydream by Katherine Jenkins
- Can't Make This Over by Pixie Lott
- Fearless Love by Melissa Etheridge
- So-Called Chaos by Alanis Morissette
- Can't Be Tamed by Miley Cyrus
- Real Gone by Sheryl Crow
- Liberté by The Doobie Brothers
- "Shakespeare" by Miranda Cosgrove
- III by Take That

== Collaborations ==
- Well... - Katey Sagal (1994)
- Your Little Secret - Melissa Etheridge (1995)
- Love and Money - Eddie Money (1995)
- Head Over Heels - Paula Abdul (1995)
- When We Were the New Boys - Rod Stewart (1998)
- Screamin' for My Supper - Beth Hart (1999)
- Breakdown - Melissa Etheridge (1999)
- Trouble in Shangri-La - Stevie Nicks (2001)
- The Spirit Room - Michelle Branch (2001)
- Respect Yourself - Joe Cocker (2002)
- C'mon, C'mon - Sheryl Crow (2002)
- Hotel Paper - Michelle Branch (2003)
- One Heart - Céline Dion (2003)
- Blue Skies - Diana DeGarmo (2004)
- Breakaway - Kelly Clarkson (2004)
- Hilary Duff by Hilary Duff (2004)
- So-Called Chaos - Alanis Morissette (2004)
- Lucky - Melissa Etheridge (2004)
- Anastacia - Anastacia (2004)
- Wildflower - Sheryl Crow (2005)
- Still the Same... Great Rock Classics of Our Time - Rod Stewart (2006)
- The Great Escape - Ilse DeLange (2006)
- Right Where You Want Me - Jesse McCartney (2006)
- Delta - Delta Goodrem (2007)
- Taking Chances - Céline Dion (2007)
- Songs for You, Truths for Me - James Morrison (2008)
- Pebble to a Pearl - Nikka Costa (2008)
- Bittersweet World - Ashlee Simpson (2008)
- Everything Comes and Goes - Michelle Branch (2010)
- Fearless Love - Melissa Etheridge (2010)
- Child of the Universe - Delta Goodrem (2012)
- The Spirit Indestructible - Nelly Furtado (2012)
- Since I Saw You Last - Gary Barlow (2013)
- Something Worth Saving - Gavin DeGraw (2016)
- Walls - Barbra Streisand (2018)
- The Medicine Show - Melissa Etheridge (2019)
- Soul - Elisa (2019)
- Liberté by The Doobie Brothers (2021)
- The Girl That I Call Home - Tears for Fears (2024)
- Walk This Road - The Doobie Brothers (2025)
