= Irish Water Safety =

Water Safety Ireland (WSI) (Formerly Irish Water Safety) is a registered charity that promotes water safety in Ireland. Its programmes were formerly part of the Irish Red Cross Society. Its headquarters are in Galway City.

It trains people in swimming, lifesaving and water survival courses and also produces information promoting safe practices in, on and around water. It recognizes people who have saved others from drowning. Many of its members and leaders are qualified in health and safety and therefore liaise with authorities to protect the safety of the Irish public.

The acting chairperson of Water Safety Ireland is Clare McGrath.
