= List of best-selling music artists in the United Kingdom in singles sales =

Published by the Official Charts Company in June 2012 to coincide with both the 60th anniversary of the UK Official Singles Chart and the Queen's Diamond Jubilee. At the time, there were twelve artists with more than ten million UK singles sales, with Paul McCartney being the only act to achieve this both as part of a group and as a solo artist.

Many of the artists in the list below have both streaming and sales included in their totals:

1. Coldplay (36,600,000)
2. Eminem (30,000,000)
3. Madonna (29,345,000)
4. Rihanna (27,100,000)
5. Michael Jackson (26,995,000)
6. Little Mix (23,000,000)
7. The Beatles (22,100,000)
8. Elton John (21,635,000)
9. Cliff Richard (21,500,000)
10. Beyoncé (14,500,000)
11. Ariana Grande (13,200,000)
12. Westlife (12,854,000)
13. Justin Bieber (12,800,000)
14. Elvis Presley (12,600,000)
15. David Bowie (12,000,000)
16. ABBA (11,300,000)
17. Paul McCartney (10,200,000)
18. Bee Gees (10,165,000)
19. Kylie Minogue (10,100,000)
20. The Rolling Stones (10,100,000)
21. Rita Ora (9,800,000)
22. Taylor Swift (9,600,000)
23. Rod Stewart
24. Take That
25. Stevie Wonder
26. Whitney Houston (9,400,000)
27. Imagine Dragons (9,400,000)
28. Oasis (9,079,000)
29. Spice Girls (8,500,000)
30. George Michael
31. Robbie Williams
32. Britney Spears (7,635,000)
33. U2 (7,500,000)
34. Shakin' Stevens
35. Lady Gaga (7,357,000)
36. Status Quo (7,200,000)
37. Boyzone (7,100,000)
38. Blondie (7,037,000)
39. The Black Eyed Peas (7,034,000)
40. Boney M (6,859,000)
41. Slade (6,856,000)
42. Celine Dion
43. UB40 (6,600,000)
44. Olivia Newton-John
45. Mariah Carey
46. Tom Jones
47. Madness (6,150,00)
48. Police (6,100,000)
49. Wham!
50. Phil Collins
51. Diana Ross
52. The Jam
53. Bryan Adams
54. Pet Shop Boys
55. David Guetta
56. Adam Ant
57. Duran Duran
58. Frank Sinatra
59. Frankie Goes To Hollywood
60. Prince
61. Katy Perry
62. Wet Wet Wet
63. The Everly Brothers
64. The Shadows (not including any with Cliff Richard)
65. Pink
