= Gravity (Westlife album) =

Studio album by Westlife
- Released: 19 November 2010
- Recorded: July – October 2010
- Studios: Henson, Hollywood, California; RAK, London, UK
- Genres: Pop; pop rock; dance-pop
- Length: 48:05
- Labels: Syco; Sony; RCA
- Producer: John Shanks

Westlife chronology
Where We Are (2009)	Gravity (2010)	Greatest Hits (2011)

Singles from Gravity
- 1. "Safe" Released: 14 November 2010

Gravity is the tenth studio album release by the Irish boy band Westlife and it was released on 19 November 2010 in the United Kingdom. John Shanks produced each song, barring the bonus track on the Japanese edition. The album was preceded by the lead single, "Safe", which was released on 14 November 2010.

This is the group's final album under Syco Music, as well as their final album before their initial split in 2012. As of November 2011, the album had sold 358,943 copies in the UK.

== Background ==
The recording process for the album started in July 2010; its recording and mixing was finished in October 2010. They recorded the songs in Los Angeles, California, Dublin, Ireland, and London, England.

On 19 July 2010, it was reported by RTÉ that the group would work with producer John Shanks. Westlife told Digital Spy: "We'd wanted to work with him for a long time, but all his loyalty was to Take That and he didn't want to work with another boyband." On 17 September 2010, Egan said that the first single for the album was picked by Cowell and a 30-second snippet was played on X Factor UK. On 1 November 2010, Mark confirmed two cover songs on the album are "Chances" by Athlete and "The Reason" by Hoobastank.

== Album name and artwork ==
On 22 October 2010, the band released a video of the album photo shoot on their official sites. The official photographer of the shoot was Kevin McDaid and Feehily as the creative director.

On 13 October 2010, they announced the album title Gravity and trended worldwide on Twitter as #westlifegravity after the announcement. The album title was suggested by a fan.

== Promotion ==
=== Singles ===
"Safe" was the lead single from the album, released on 14 November in the UK. Their debut performance of the track was on the X Factor the day or release. It peaked at No. 10 in its first week consequently making it their lowest charting lead single to date in the UK, as well as their lowest sales for a lead single.

It was later confirmed on 1 February 2011 that there would be no second single for Gravity. Byrne stated that it was Syco's decision. On 14 March 2011, Westlife confirmed that they had left Syco Music and moved to another Sony division, RCA, with the group citing the decision not to release a second single as the reason.

"I Will Reach You" was released as a promotional single on 17 February 2011 in Indonesia, Ireland, and the Philippines.

== Critical reception ==
Professional ratings
Review scores
Source	Rating
Daily Express	3/5 stars
Entertainment.ie	2/5 stars
Expressen	2/5 stars
Financial Times	2/5 stars
OK!	4/5 stars
Time Out	2.5/5 stars

OK! found that Gravity was Westlife's "most varied and daring album yet, mixing classic pop and rock with subtle electro wizardry." The magazine also praised standout tracks such as "Safe" and "Chances," concluding that the record was "soaring stuff" and a strong addition to the band's catalogue. Hannah Spencer from Contactmusic characterised Gravity as continuing their "well-perfected" formula of "cheesy, romantic" pop ballads. She concluded that the album "doesn’t offer anything groundbreaking," instead representing "a good, strong consistent if safe effort," noting its reliance on familiar songwriting patterns. Entertainment Focus's Sarah Bargiela described Gravity as showing Westlife continuing their established formula, while noting that the opening track "could easily be released as a single" and represents "the Westlife we fell in love with a decade ago." She observed that the album relies heavily on their "classic style" of building ballads and familiar structures, concluding that while there are "outstanding tracks," there is also "a lack of variety."

BBC's Natalie Shaw found that Gravity was "the musical equivalent of greetings-card copy," calling it predictable and "outside of the realms of ambition, place and time." She concluded that it was "questionable what this album has to offer to anyone other than a completist," criticising its formulaic songwriting and lack of originality. Entertainment.ie described Gravity as "drudgery of the highest order," noting a limited attempt to introduce "a little bit of fun" through a few upbeat tracks. It concluded that the album was "still a fair way off being a halfway decent record," though "it could have been a lot worse," criticising its formulaic songwriting and reliance on clichés. Jacqueline Smith from Time Out argued that the album's reliance on Hoobastank's "The Reason" as its strongest track "is a good indicator of what the rest of the album holds." She concluded that while "devout collectors might be pleased with the predictability," others would find the songs "melodically sound but not-the-slightest-bit-inspiring," criticising its lack of originality and inspiration. Writing for The Daily Star, Sarah-Louise James felt that Gravity represented "the sound of the ‘Loife on the way up rather than the way down," marking a shift towards a "tougher and moodier" sound as the band moved on from their established template of ballads and covers. She concluded that "they pull it off with aplomb."

== Track listing ==
All tracks produced by John Shanks except noted tracks.

Gravity track listing
No.	Title	Writer(s)	Lead vocals	Length
1.	"Beautiful Tonight"	John Shanks; Paul Barry	Filan; Feehily	4:00
2.	"Safe"	Shanks; James Grundler	Filan; Feehily	3:53
3.	"Chances"	Joel Pott; Carey Willetts; Steven Roberts; Timothy Wanstall	Filan; Feehily	4:46
4.	"I Will Reach You"	Mark Feehily; Steve Anderson; Jamie Hartman	Filan; Feehily	3:21
5.	"Closer"	Shanks; John Reid; Nicky Byrne; Kian Egan; Feehily; Shane Filan	Filan; Feehily	4:06
6.	"The Reason"	Douglas Robb; Dan Estrin; Chris Hesse; Markku Lappalainen	Filan; Feehily	3:54
7.	"Tell Me It's Love"	Shanks; Wayne Hector	Filan; Feehily; Byrne	4:18
8.	"I Get Weak"	Shanks; Savan Kotecha	Filan; Feehily; Egan	3:42
9.	"Before It's Too Late"	Anderson; Feehily; Simon Petty	Feehily	4:09
10.	"No One's Gonna Sleep Tonight"	Shanks; Hector	Filan; Feehily	3:53
11.	"Difference in Me"	Shanks; Hector	Filan	3:29
12.	"Too Hard to Say Goodbye"	Shanks; Byrne; Egan; Feehily; Filan	Byrne; Egan; Feehily; Filan	4:44
Total length:				48:05

Japanese bonus track
No.	Title	Writer(s)	Producer	Length
13.	"Please Stay"	Burt Bacharach; Bob Hilliard	Steve Anderson	3:43

German bonus track
No.	Title	Writer(s)	Length
13.	"Safe" (music video)	Grundler, Shanks	3:59

== Credits ==
- Mark Feehily – art direction, creative direction
- Shari Sutcliffe – contract musician, production coordinator
- Steve Stacey – design
- Bob Ludwig – mastering
- Kevin McDaid – photography

== Charts ==
=== Weekly charts ===
Weekly chart performance for Gravity
Chart (2010)	Peak position
Dutch Albums (MegaCharts)	76
European Albums Chart	12
Irish Albums (IRMA)	1
Japanese Albums (Oricon)	91
Mexican Albums (AMPROFON)	90
New Zealand Albums (RMNZ)	22
Scottish Albums (OCC)	4
South Korean Albums (Gaon)	7
Swedish Albums (Sverigetopplistan)	46
Swiss Albums (Swiss Hitparade)	50
Taiwanese Albums (Five Music)	3
UK Albums (OCC)	3

=== Year-end charts ===
2009 year-end chart performance for Gravity
Chart (2009)	Position
Irish Albums (IRMA)	15
UK Albums (OCC)	34

== Certifications and sales ==
Certifications for Gravity
Region	Certification	Certified units/sales
Ireland (IRMA)	2× Platinum	30,000^{^}
United Kingdom (BPI)	Platinum	300,000^{^}
^{^} Shipments figures based on certification alone.

== Release history ==
=== Main release ===
Country / region	Date	Format	Label	Catalogue
Europe	19 November 2010	CD, Digital download	RCA Records, Sony Music	88697724482
Ireland	19 November 2010	CD, Digital download	RCA Records, Sony Music	88697724482
Netherlands	19 November 2010	CD, Digital download	RCA Records, Sony Music	88697724482
Philippines	19 November 2010	CD, Digital download	Sony Music Entertainment, Ivory Music and Video	88697724482
Sweden	19 November 2010	CD, Digital download	Sony Music Entertainment	88697724482
Thailand	19 November 2010	CD, Digital download	Sony Music Entertainment	88697724482
Denmark	22 November 2010	CD, Digital download	Sony Music Entertainment	88697724482
Hong Kong	22 November 2010	CD, Digital download	Sony Music Entertainment	88697724482
Malaysia	22 November 2010	CD, Digital download	Sony Music Entertainment	88697724482
Poland	22 November 2010	CD, Digital download	Sony Music Entertainment	88697724482
South Africa	22 November 2010	CD, Digital download	Sony Music Entertainment	88697724482
United Kingdom	22 November 2010	CD, Digital download	S/Syco Music	88697724482
South Korea	23 November 2010	CD, Digital download	Sony Music Entertainment	88697724482
Finland	24 November 2010	CD, Digital download	Sony Music Entertainment	88697724482
Mexico	26 November 2010	CD, Digital download	Sony Music Entertainment	88697724482
Taiwan	30 November 2010	CD, Digital download	Sony Music Entertainment	88697724482
Germany	3 December 2010	CD, Digital download	Sony Music Entertainment	88697724482
Japan	15 December 2010	CD, Digital download	Sony Music Japan International	SICP-2929

=== Import release ===
Country / region	Date	Format	Label	Catalogue
Japan	22 November 2010	CD, Digital download	RCA Records, Sony Music, Syco Music	88697724482
Canada	23 November 2010	CD, Digital download	RCA Records, Sony Music, Syco Music	88697724482
France	23 November 2010	CD, Digital download	RCA Records, Sony Music, Syco Music	88697724482
United States	23 November 2010	CD, Digital download	RCA Records, Sony Music, Syco Music	88697724482
