= Lighthouse (Westlife song) =

Single by Westlife

from the album Greatest Hits
- B-side: "Poet's Heart"
- Released: 11 November 2011
- Recorded: May – September 2011
- Studio: Henson, Hollywood, California; RAK, London
- Genre: Pop rock
- Length: 4:22
- Label: Sony; RCA
- Songwriters: Gary Barlow; John Shanks
- Producer: John Shanks

Westlife singles chronology
"Safe" (2010)	"Lighthouse" (2011)	"Hello My Love" (2019)

Music video
- "Lighthouse" on YouTube

"Lighthouse" is a song by Irish boy band Westlife and it is the lead single from their second compilation album Greatest Hits (2011). The song is their final physical single after their announcement to disband prior to their 2018 reformation. Also the single is the group's first and last physical single not under the tutelage of Simon Cowell, having left Syco and Cowell in March 2011. The song was written by Gary Barlow and John Shanks, and was released on 11 November 2011. A music video was filmed in South Africa and premiered on 20 October 2011.

The song debuted at number two on the UK Physical Singles Chart shortly after release. Overall, the song became their second-lowest charting single in Ireland and the United Kingdom, charting at number eleven and thirty-two respectively.

== Background ==
Band members Mark Feehily and Nicky Byrne discussed the song during a behind-the-scenes look at the music video shoot. They explained, "We were excited to be working with 'the competition'. It's the first time that someone like Gary has written a song for a group in competition with his own. Him and John wrote Patience for Take That, so we are confident that we have a great team of writers. Some people think that we regard Gary as an enemy, but we don't at all. It's cool that he's written a song for us." Shane Filan also stated, "I love the idea of Gary writing a song for us. He's thrown all the rules out of the window". The band's manager Louis Walsh revealed later: "Gary wrote that song for Elton John a few years ago. And he gave it to the producer, and the producer gave it to the guys because they didn't have anything else."

== Release ==
The song received its first radio airplay on 30 September 2011, during the prime-time hour on LincsFM with Eddie Shaw. Shortly after the song was played, the hashtag #westlifelighthouse became a trending topic worldwide on Twitter. An official 90-second official preview of the song was released via SoundCloud on 4 October 2011. On 7 October 2011, the single's artwork was unveiled by the band's official website. On 14 October 2011, they launched a new pre-order system for the single by texting 'Westlife' to 80115. The full, high quality radio edit of the song was posted on their YouTube site on 10 October 2011.

== Critical reception ==
Robert Copsey of Digital Spy claimed: "It's probably the most grown-up sounding single Westlife have ever released." Julia Simpson of Yahoo expressed: "We can indeed confirm that it's the Irish boys back at their best. Think Elton John, pianos and romance as the song opens gently. But before long it gives way to a rich, uplifting chorus like some of Westlife's best ballads – but with a touch of Take That in there too." 98fm.com expressed: "The song gives Westlife a more grown up feel and it reminds me of the sort of song you’d hear on an X Factor package about the contestants!"

Bukisa.com added: "Lighthouse is a classic Westlife anthem. It may not be the usual slow-tempo ballad but you will feel the touch of Westlife with the piano intro, uplifting choruses, soaring melodies, powerful post middle-8 key change and harmony-filled split vocals of Shane and Mark backed by Kian and Nicky."

EF said "Whilst hardly new ground for Westlife, Lighthouse allows the group to play to their strengths".

== Chart performance ==
In Ireland, "Lighthouse" debuted at number eleven, becoming their second lowest-charting single in the country. The song debuted at number thirty-two on the UK Singles Chart, with first-week sales of 11,006 copies. The following week the song fell to number eighty-nine. It is their lowest-charting single in the United Kingdom, and their first single not to chart within the top 10.

== Music video ==
Filming for the music video of the first single began on 17 September 2011 and was shot in South Africa also like the album photoshoot. Three official video stills were posted on the band's Twitter account on 4 October 2011. The behind-the-scenes video premiered exclusively on their Vevo account on 5 October 2011, was deleted two days later but resurfaced at the same account on 13 October 2011.

The video made its premiere on Chart Show TV and on their YouTube site on 20 October 2011.

== Track listing ==
- CD single / EP / digital download / digital audio bundle
1. "Lighthouse" – 4:22
2. "Poet's Heart" (or "A Poet's Heart") (John Shanks, Ruth-Anne Cunningham) – 3:57

== Charts ==
Chart (2011)	Peak position
Ireland (IRMA)	11
Ireland Download (GfK Chart-Track)	15
Scotland Singles (OCC)	27
South Korea (Gaon International Digital Chart)	6
South Korea (Gaon International Download Chart)	10
South Korea (Gaon International Streaming Chart)	8
UK Singles (OCC)	32
UK Physical Singles (OCC)	2

=== Year-end charts ===
Chart (2011)	Position
Taiwan (Hito Radio)	72

== Sales ==
Chart	Count
South Korea (Gaon Download Chart) (total recorded)	96,025
South Korea (Gaon Streaming Chart) (total recorded)	344,068
United Kingdom (OCC) (First week only)	11,006

== Release history ==
Region	Date	Format	Label
Ireland	30 September 2011	Radio airplay	Sony Music, RCA
United Kingdom	30 September 2011	Radio airplay	Sony Music, RCA
Ireland	20 October 2011	TV airplay	Sony Music, RCA
United Kingdom	20 October 2011	TV airplay	Sony Music, RCA
Ireland	11 November 2011	Digital download	Sony Music, RCA
United Kingdom	13 November 2011	Digital download	Sony Music, RCA
United Kingdom	14 November 2011	CD single	Sony Music, RCA
