= Where We Are =

Studio album by Westlife
- Released: 27 November 2009
- Recorded: July 2009 – October 2009
- Genres: Pop; pop rock
- Length: 52:05
- Labels: S; RCA; Sony Music
- Producers: Louis Biancaniello; Steve Booker; Scott Cutler; Carl Falk; Jim Jonsin; Brian Kennedy; Emanuel Kiriakou; Anne Preven; Conner Reeves; Steve Robson; Ryan Tedder; Martin Terefe; Sam Watters; Greg Wells

Westlife chronology
Back Home (2007)	Where We Are (2009)	Gravity (2010)

Singles from Where We Are
- 1. "What About Now" Released: 23 October 2009

Where We Are is the ninth studio album by Irish boy band Westlife. It was released on 27 November 2009 in Ireland and on 30 November 2009 in the UK through S Records, RCA Records and Sony Music. Where We Are is the group's first album following a hiatus in 2008. This album was preceded by the lead single "What About Now" (a cover of the Daughtry song) and it was released on 23 October 2009 as a digital download a day later as a CD single.

The group collaborated with numerous notable producers for the album, notably Ryan Tedder of the pop rock band OneRepublic, Jim Jonsin, Greg Wells and Sam Watters, among others. Where We Are is also notably the first Westlife album not to have Steve Mac and Wayne Hector produce or write any of the songs.

The album was met with mixed reviews, although it was still commercially successful, debuting at number two at the UK Albums Chart and got 2× Platinum Certification in the United Kingdom which sold more than 600,000 records. Despite the high peak, it was the first Westlife album not to peak at number one since their 2004 album Allow Us to Be Frank peaked at number three. This is the 7th top-selling album of 2009 in Ireland.

== Background ==
The recording process of the album started in LA on 1 July 2009. The first song they recorded was the ballad, "I’ll See You Again"". "I'll See You Again" was recorded by Ross at Metropolis Studios. For their first single "What About Now" Feehily told The Daily Mirror, "We wanted the first single from our new album to be somewhere between the Westlife sound our fans know and love, and the new direction we're heading in." The song "Shadows" was written by Ryan Tedder and AJ McLean for the Backstreet Boys' seventh album This Is Us but was not selected for inclusion. It was subsequently purchased by record label boss Simon Cowell for Leona Lewis's second album Echo but it was later decided that the song was more suited to a boyband and thus given Westlife to record.

The album also contains an "in memory of" section to Nikky Byrne and Kevin Egan, the fathers of Westlife members Nicky Byrne and Kian Egan.

== Promotion ==
On 25 October 2009, during the X Factor results show, Westlife performed "What About Now". It was released online the same day. On 26 October they performed on GMTV and were interviewed in addition to hosting a webchat, with a further interview on The One Show on 30 October 2009. They will also perform at BBC Children in Need on 20 November and be interviewed on 26 November and 4 December on Alan Carr's Chatty Man and The Friday Show respectively. They are also doing radio promos in major cities of UK and Ireland from 24 October–November including an interview on BBC Radio One. TV dates were announced later. Following a Swedish promotional tour with performance on Swedish Idol. On 27 November 2009, Westlife performed on infamous UK television shows like Paul O' Grady Show and The Late Late Toy Show.

On 1 February 2010, their official website was revised. They called it as a first phase of 2010 assault. On 10 February 2010, they are invited to Jonathan Ross show for an interview to be televised on 12 February 2010. First week of February, they embarked on a promotional tour of Germany and guested on the Oliver Pocher Show on the third week of February.

"How to Break a Heart" was released as a promotional single on 10 March 2010 in some countries. They got the chance to perform with Boyzone for a track on the Stephen Gately Show in Ireland. They were invited to perform on Sun City Super Bowl Show on South Africa to be held on 19 March and Fashion Kicks 2010 on 13 April.

== Critical reception ==
Professional ratings
Review scores
Source	Rating
AllMusic	3.5/5 stars
Daily Express	2/5 stars
Digital Spy	1/5 stars
Entertainment.ie	2/5 stars
London Evening Standard	2/5 stars
MSN	2/5 stars
The Times	4/5 stars
Virgin Media	1/5 stars

Where We Are received largely mixed-to-negative reviews, with many critics criticizing its repetitive sound and perceived lack of artistic progression from Westlife’s earlier releases. In one of the more positive assessments, Jason Birchmeier of AllMusic awarded the album three and a half stars out of five, acknowledging the group’s familiar musical formula while praising its collection of "many first-rate songs" and production that was "polished to perfection." In another favorable review, Mike Diver of BBC Music highlighted several "surprises" on the album, though he also remarked that the band's style had "barely changed." OK! magazine offered a notably enthusiastic response, describing the record as Westlife's "best yet" and praising its "slightly rockier" and "anthemic" sound, influenced by Take That, while noting that its "string-drenched ballads" retained the group’s signature style.

Several reviewers were far less impressed. Robert Spellman of The Daily Express gave the album two stars out of five, arguing that the songs were too similar and focused excessively on heartbreak. Writing for Entertainment.ie, Lauren Murphy offered a similarly critical view, describing the record as "maudlin and one-dimensional," though she praised Mark Feehily's vocals. Rick Pearson from The London Evening Standard labeled the songs "bland" and "uninspiring," concluding that Where We Are left Westlife sounding much the same as they had at the start of the decade. Other critics were even harsher. Ben Chalk of MSN stated that the album is "aimed squarely at the sort of person who buys one album a year, usually at Christmas, to listen to in the car." In his review for The Observer, Hugh Montgomery criticized the album's "usual [...] over-production, ersatz yearning and (anti-)climactic key changes." Alex Fletcher of Digital Spy panned Where We Are, saying that "there isn't a drop of passion, genuine emotion or soul to be found anywhere," while Ian Gittins of Virgin Media gave the album one star out of five, saying that the album's "only emotion [...] is a sinking sense of déjà vu."

== Commercial performance ==
In Ireland, Where We Are peaked at number two on the Irish Albums Chart and was later certified triple platinum by the Irish Recorded Music Association (IRMA), denoting shipments of over 45,000 copies. The album also ranked among the country's best-selling releases of 2009, finishing at number eight on the year-end chart. In the United Kingdom, the album debuted at number two on the UK Albums Chart and was certified double platinum by the British Phonographic Industry (BPI) for shipments exceeding 600,000 copies. It was the 28th best-selling album of 2009 in the UK and continued to chart into 2010, appearing on the year-end chart again that year. Internationally, Where We Are achieved moderate chart success, reaching the top 10 in Greece, Sweden, and Taiwan, while also charting in countries including Austria, Germany, Japan, Mexico, New Zealand, South Korea, and Switzerland. The album earned a gold certification in both New Zealand and Sweden.

== Track listing ==
Where We Are track listing
No.	Title	Writer(s)	Producer(s)	Length
1.	"What About Now"	David Hodges; Ben Moody; Joshua Hartzler	Steve Robson	4:11
2.	"How to Break a Heart"	James Scheffer; Louis Biancaniello; Sam Watters	Biancaniello; Jim Jonsin; Watters	4:04
3.	"Leaving"	Carl Falk; Bryn Christopher; Steven Lee Olsen	Falk; Quiz & Larossi^{[a]}	3:57
4.	"Shadows"	Ryan Tedder; AJ McLean	Tedder	4:01
5.	"Talk Me Down"	Simon Petty	Steve Anderson	4:01
6.	"Where We Are"	Tedder; Savan Kotecha	Tedder	3:57
7.	"The Difference"	Scott Cutler; Anne Preven; Brian Kennedy	Cutler; Preven; Kennedy	3:30
8.	"As Love Is My Witness"	Conner Reeves; Jonathan Shorten	Martin Terefe	4:07
9.	"Another World"	Steve Booker; Sophie Delila	Booker	3:16
10.	"No More Heroes"	Kotecha; Emanuel Kiriakou; Lindy Robbins	Kiriakou	3:58
11.	"Sound of a Broken Heart"	Wayne Wilkins; Biancaniello; Watters; John Reid	Biancaniello; Watters; Wilkins	3:51
12.	"Reach Out"	Mark Feehily; Shaznay Lewis; Chris Braide	Greg Wells	3:56
13.	"I'll See You Again"	Andy Hill; Shelly Poole	Kiriakou; Hill^{[a]}	5:17
Total length:				52:05

Japan bonus track
No.	Title	Writer(s)	Producer(s)	Length
14.	"You Raise Me Up" (live at Croke Park)	Brendan Graham; Rolf Løvland	Decca	5:00

Notes

- ^{^[a]} signifies an additional producer
- "What About Now" was not included on the Czech and Slovak track listing.

== Credits ==
- Vanessa Addo-Yeboah – Vocals
- Ian Agate – Engineer
- Joel Anderson – Cover Photo
- Steve Anderson – Arranger, Engineer, Mixing, Producer, String Arrangements
- David Angell – Violin
- Jesse Astin – Egg Shaker
- Paul Beard – Piano
- Louis Biancaniello – Composer, Engineer, Guitar, Keyboards, Producer, Programming
- Chris Blade – Arranger, Producer
- Steve Booker – Bass, Composer, Keyboards, Producer, Programming
- Jeff Bova – String Arrangements, Strings
- Chris Braide – Composer, Producer
- Karl Brazil – Drums
- John Catchings - Cello
- Nikolaj Juel Christiansen – Guitar
- Bryan Christopher – Composer
- Bryn Christopher – Producer
- Scott Cutler – Composer, Egg Shaker, Guitar, Producer, Programming
- David Davidson – Orchestration, String Transcription, Violin
- Sophie Delila – Composer, Piano, Producer
- Alessandro Destefanis – Assistant
- Althea Edwards – Vocals
- Carl Falk – Composer, Producer
- Mark Feehily – Composer, Producer, Vocals
- Richard Flack – Engineer
- John Garrison – Bass
- Dyre Gormsen – Engineer
- Simon Hale – Arranger, Strings
- Joshua Hartzler – Composer
- Heard But Not Seen Choir – Choir, Chorus
- Andy Hill – Additional Production, Producer
- Iain Hill – Engineer
- David Hodges – Composer
- Christian Howes – Strings
- Henrik Janson – String Arrangements
- Candace Johnson – Vocals
- Lawrence Johnson – Vocal Arrangement
- Bryon Jones – Vocals
- Priscilla Jones – Vocals
- Jim Jonsin – Keyboards, Producer, Programming
- Jon Kelly – Engineer
- Brian Kennedy – Guitar, Producer, Programming
- Emanuel Kiriakou – Composer, Engineer, Instrumentation, Producer, Programming
- Savan Kotecha – Composer, Producer
- Larossi – Additional Production, Engineer
- Josef Larossi – Instrumentation, Programming
- Damien Lewis – Engineer
- Shaznay Lewis – Composer, Producer
- Peter Ljung – Piano
- The London Session Orchestra – Strings
- The Love Sponge Strings – Strings
- Will Malone – Keyboards, Programming, String Arrangements, Synthesizer
- Rob Marks – Engineer
- Subrina McCalla – Vocals
- Kevin McDaid – Photography
- Alexander McLean – Composer, Producer
- Vlado Meller – Mastering
- Millennia Strings – Strings
- Candice Mimi-Appiah – Vocals
- Ben Moody – Composer
- Esbjörn Öhrwall – Guitar
- Steven Lee Olsen – Composer, Producer
- Andreas Olsson – Keyboards, Programming
- Ross 'Dights' Parkin – Engineer
- John Parricelli – Guitar
- Doug Petty – Bass, Drum Programming, Guitar (Acoustic), Guitar (Electric), Keyboards, *Percussion, Piano
- Simon Petty – Composer, Guitar (Acoustic), Producer
- Ian Pitter – Vocals
- Shelly Poole – Producer
- Luke Potashnick – Guitar
- Anne Preven – Composer, Producer
- Quiz – Engineer, Mixing
- Quiz – Additional Production
- Zac Rae – Guitar, Programming
- Conner Reeves – Composer, Producer
- John Reid – Composer
- Jon Reid – Producer
- Carol Riley – Vocals
- Lindy Robbins – Composer, Producer
- Steve Robson – Producer
- Andreas "Quiz" Romdhane – Instrumentation, Programming
- Jeff Rothschild – Mixing
- Mark Santangelo – Assistant
- James Scheffer – Composer, Producer
- Brian Kennedy Seals – Composer
- Edward Shearmur – Strings
- Bobby Shin – Strings
- Jonathan Shorten – Composer, Producer
- Kristoffer Sonne – Drums
- Steve Stacey – Design
- Xavier Stephenson – Assistant
- Stockholm Session Strings – Strings
- Phil Tan – Mixing
- Ryan Tedder – Arranger, Composer, Engineer, Guitar, Piano, Producer, Programming, Strings
- Martin Terefe – Bass, Producer
- Pat Thrall – Editing
- Nikolaj Torplarsen – Arranger, Keyboards, Piano
- Luke Tozour – Engineer
- Neil Tucker – Engineer
- Sam Watters – Composer, Engineer, Producer
- Greg Wells – Instrumentation, Producer
- Jeremy Wheatley – Mixing, String Arrangements
- Wayne Wilkins - Composer, Keyboards, Producer, Programming
- Kris Wilkinson - Viola, Violin
- Neal Wilkinson - Drums
- Noel Zancanella – Engineer

== Charts ==
=== Weekly charts ===
Weekly chart performance for Where We Are
Chart (2009)	Peak position
Austrian Albums (Ö3 Austria)	53
German Albums (Offizielle Top 100)	42
Greek Albums (IFPI)	9
Irish Albums (IRMA)	2
Japanese Albums (Oricon)	77
Mexican Albums (Top 100 Mexico)	71
New Zealand Albums (RMNZ)	13
Scottish Albums (Official Charts)	2
South Korean Albums (Circle)	27
Swedish Albums (Sverigetopplistan)	8
Swiss Albums (Schweizer Hitparade)	25
Taiwanese Albums (Five Music)	3
UK Albums (Official Charts)	2

=== Year-end charts ===
2009 year-end chart performance for Where We Are
Chart (2009)	Position
Irish Albums (IRMA)	8
UK Albums (OCC)	28

2010 year-end chart performance for Where We Are
Chart (2010)	Position
UK Albums (OCC)	198

== Certifications ==
Certifications for Where We Are
Region	Certification	Certified units/sales
Ireland (IRMA)	3× Platinum	45,000^{^}
New Zealand (RMNZ)	Gold	7,500^{^}
Sweden (GLF)	Gold	20,000^{^}
United Kingdom (BPI)	2× Platinum	600,000^{^}
^{^} Shipments figures based on certification alone.

== Release history ==
Where We Are release history
Region	Date	Format	Label	Catalogue
Ireland	27 November 2009	CD, Digital download	RCA Records	88697611272
Philippines	28 November 2009	CD, Digital download	Sony Music Entertainment	88697611272
New Zealand	30 November 2009	CD, Digital download	Sony Music Entertainment	88697611272
Norway	30 November 2009	CD, Digital download	Sony Music Entertainment	88697611272
South Africa	30 November 2009	CD, Digital download	Sony Music Entertainment	88697611272
United Kingdom	30 November 2009	CD, Digital download	S/Syco Music	88697611272
Hong Kong	30 November 2009	CD, Digital download	Sony Music Entertainment	88697611272
South Korea	1 December 2009	CD, Digital download	Sony Music Entertainment	88697611272
Europe	2 December 2009	CD, Digital download	Sony Music Entertainment	88697611272
Finland	2 December 2009	CD, Digital download	Sony Music Entertainment	88697611272
Malaysia	2 December 2009	CD, Digital download	Sony Music Entertainment	88697611272
Sweden	2 December 2009	CD, Digital download	Sony Music Entertainment	88697611272
Netherlands	3 December 2009	CD, Digital download	Sony Music	88697611272
Taiwan	4 December 2009	CD, Digital download	Sony Music	88697611272
France	8 December 2009	CD, Digital download	Sony Music	B002RHP88S
Japan	23 December 2009	CD, Digital download	Sony Music Japan	SICP2509
Thailand	21 January 2010	CD, Digital download	Sony Music	88697611272
Australia	22 January 2010	CD, Digital download	Sony Music	88697611272
China	25 January 2010	CD, Digital download	Sony Music	88697611272
Austria	5 February 2010	CD, Digital download	Sony Music	88697611272
Germany	5 February 2010	CD, Digital download	Sony Music	88697611272
Switzerland	5 February 2010	CD, Digital download	Sony Music	88697611272
Mexico	15 March 2010	CD, Digital download	Sony Music	886976112721
Czech Republic	5 April 2010	CD, Digital download	Sony Music	289173
Slovakia	5 April 2010	CD, Digital download	Sony Music	289173
