= The Love Album (Westlife album) =

Studio album by Westlife
- Released: 20 November 2006
- Genre: Pop
- Length: 41:53
- Label: Sony BMG
- Producers: David Kreuger; Per Magnusson; Larossi; Quiz; Steve Mac

Westlife chronology
Face to Face (2005)	The Love Album (2006)	Back Home (2007)

Singles from The Love Album
- 1. "The Rose" Released: 6 November 2006

Professional ratings
Review scores
Source	Rating
AllMusic	3.5/5 stars
Blogcritics	3/5 stars
MTV Asia	5/10
Onet	5/5 stars
Rovi	3.5/5 stars

The Love Album is the seventh studio album by Irish boy band Westlife. It was released in the Philippines on 13 November 2006 and in the UK on 20 November 2006. The first and only single released was a cover of the Bette Midler song "The Rose", which reached No. 1 in Ireland and the UK. It was the band's 14th No. 1 single. The song was first performed at Miss World 2006.

The album debuted at its peak position at No. 1 on the UK Charts, selling 219,662 copies in the UK that week. It also spent one week at number two and two weeks at number three. One of those number-three weeks have the highest sales for that said peak for a week in the whole year of 2006. It re-entered at number 17 at the Official UK Budget Albums Chart in November 2009. The album also appeared in the list of best album sales of Hong Kong in 2007.

Their cover version of "Nothing's Gonna Change My Love for You", which is included in the deluxe version of the album, has been viewed 100 million times on YouTube.

== Track listing ==
The Love Album — Standard edition
No.	Title	Writer(s)	Producer(s)	Length
1.	"The Rose"	Amanda McBroom	Quiz & Larossi	3:39
2.	"Total Eclipse of the Heart"	Jim Steinman	Steve Mac	4:40
3.	"All Out of Love" (featuring Delta Goodrem)	Graham Russell • Clive Davis	David Kreuger • Per Magnusson	3:44
4.	"You Light Up My Life"	Joe Brooks	Quiz & Larossi	3:27
5.	"Easy"	Lionel Richie	Steve Mac	4:26
6.	"You Are So Beautiful (to Me)"	Billy Preston • Bruce Fisher	Steve Mac	3:03
7.	"Have You Ever Been in Love"	Andy Hill • Peter Sinfield • John Danter	Steve Mac	3:41
8.	"Love Can Build a Bridge"	John Barlow Jarvis • Naomi Judd • Paul Overstreet	Quiz & Larossi	3:55
9.	"The Dance"	Anthony Arata	Steve Mac	3:58
10.	"All or Nothing"	Steve Mac • Wayne Hector	Steve Mac	3:56
11.	"You've Lost That Loving Feeling"	Phil Spector • Barry Mann • Cynthia Weil	Steve Mac	3:25

The Love Album — Japanese edition bonus tracks
No.	Title	Writer(s)	Producer(s)	Length
12.	"Solitaire"	Neil Sedaka • Phil Cody	Steve Mac	5:07
13.	"Nothing's Gonna Change My Love for You"	Michael Masser • Gerry Goffin	Graham Stack	3:47

The Love Album — Deluxe edition bonus disc
No.	Title	Writer(s)	Producer(s)	Length
1.	"Butterfly Kisses"	Bob Carlisle • Randy Thomas	Graham Stack	5:38
2.	"Nothing's Gonna Change My Love for You"	Michael Masser • Gerry Goffin	Graham Stack	3:47
3.	"If"	David Gates	Graham Stack	2:42
4.	"Solitaire"	Neil Sedaka • Phil Cody	Steve Mac	5:07
5.	"Still Here"	Kristian Lundin • Savan Kotecha	Jake Schulz • Carl Falk	3:51
6.	"Total Eclipse of the Heart" (Sunset Strippers verse radio edit)	Jim Steinman	Steve Mac • Sunset Strippers	3:48

== Credits ==
- Accordion:
  Eddie Hesson (tracks: 2, 5 to 7, 9 to 11)
- Arranged By [Additional Choir Arrangements]:
  Lawrence Johnson (tracks: 1, 4, 8)
- Arranged By [Strings]:
  Dave Arch (tracks: 2, 5 to 7, 9 to 11)
  Ulf & Henrik Janson (tracks: 1, 3, 4, 8)
- Arranged By [Vocals]:
  Andy Caine,
  Steve Mac (tracks: 2, 5 to 7, 9 to 11)
- Backing Vocals [Additional]:
  Andy Caine (tracks: 2, 5 to 7, 9 to 11)
  Emil Heiling (tracks: 3)
  Mae McKenna (tracks: 11)
- Bass:
  Steve Pearce (tracks: 2, 5 to 7, 9 to 11)
  Thomas Lindberg (tracks: 1, 4, 8)
- Male Choir:
  Aaron Sokell,
  Ayo Oyerinde,
  Ezra Russell,
  Lawrence Johnson,
  Michael Molton (tracks: 1, 4, 8)
- Female Choir: Alani Gibbon,
  Anna Omakina,
  Camilla Beeput,
  Donna Gardier-Elliot,
  Joy Malcolm,
  Lanoi Montet,
  Lena Palmer,
  Lorrain Smith,
  Sheena White,
  Stephanie Meade,
  Subrina Edwards (tracks: 1, 4, 8)
- Choir:
  The Tuff Session Singers (tracks: 2, 5 to 7, 9 to 11)
- Drums:
  Chris Laws,
  Ian Thomas (tracks: 2, 5 to 7, 9 to 11)
  Christer Janson (tracks: 4, 8)
- Engineer:
  Bernard Löhr (tracks: 3)
  Chris Laws,
  Ren Swan (tracks: 2, 4 to 7, 9 to 11)
  Neil Tucker,
  Quiz & Larossi* (tracks: 1, 4, 8)
- Engineer [Assistant]:
  Daniel Pursey (tracks: 2, 5 to 7, 9 to 11)
- Engineer [Mix]:
  Chris Laws (tracks: 2, 5 to 7, 9 to 11)
- Engineer [Strings]:
  Ian Agate (tracks: 1, 4, 8)
- Guitar [Guitars]:
  Esbjörn Öhrwall (tracks: 1, 3, 4, 8)
  Fridrik 'Frizzy' Karlsson,
  Paul Gendler (tracks: 2, 5 to 7, 9 to 11)
- Keyboards:
  Andreas 'Quiz' Romdhane,
  Josef Larossi (tracks: 1, 4, 8)
  Per Magnusson (tracks: 3)
  Steve Mac (tracks: 2, 5 to 7, 9 to 11)
- Mastered By:
  Vlado Meller
- Mastered By [Assistant]:
  Mark Santangelo
- Mixed By:
  Bernard Löhr (track 3)
  Quiz & Larossi (tracks: 1, 4, 8)
- Other [Management]:
  Louis Walsh
- Piano:
  Dave Arch (tracks: 2, 5 to 7, 9 to 11)
  Peter Ljung (tracks: 1, 4, 8)
- Arranged By:
  David Kreuger,
  Per Magnusson (track 3)
  Quiz & Larossi (tracks: 1, 4, 8)
  Steve Mac (tracks: 2, 5 to 7, 9 to 11)
- Programmed By:
  Andreas 'Quiz' Romdhane,
  Josef Larossi (tracks: 1, 4, 8)
  David Kreuger (track 3)
- Recorded By [Assistant Strings Recording]:
  Chris Barrett (tracks: 5 to 6, 9 to 11)
- Recorded By [Strings]:
  Geoff Foster (tracks: 5, 6, 11)
  Paul Walton (tracks: 2, 7)
  Rupert Coulson (tracks: 9, 10)

== Charts ==
=== Weekly charts ===
Chart performance for The Love Album
Chart (2006–2007)	Peak position
Argentine Albums (CAPIF)	5
Australian Albums (ARIA)	11
Austrian Albums (Ö3 Austria)	49
Dutch Albums (Album Top 100)	49
European Albums (Billboard)	5
German Albums (Offizielle Top 100)	34
Greek Albums (IFPI)	48
Irish Albums (IRMA)	1
Japanese Albums (Oricon)	52
New Zealand Albums (RMNZ)	2
Norwegian Albums (VG-lista)	1
Scottish Albums (Official Charts)	2
South African Albums (RISA)	3
Swedish Albums (Sverigetopplistan)	3
Swiss Albums (Schweizer Hitparade)	27
Taiwanese Albums (Five Music)	1
UK Albums (Official Charts)	1

=== Year-end charts ===
2006 year-end chart performance for The Love Album
Chart (2006)	Position
Australian Albums (ARIA)	83
Irish Albums (IRMA)	1
Swedish Albums (Sverigetopplistan)	27
UK Albums (OCC)	8

2007 year-end chart performance for The Love Album
Chart (2007)	Position
European Albums (Billboard)	99

== Certifications ==
Certifications for The Love Album
Region	Certification	Certified units/sales
Australia (ARIA)	Platinum	70,000^{^}
Ireland (IRMA)	10× Platinum	150,000^{^}
New Zealand (RMNZ)	3× Platinum	45,000^{^}
Sweden (GLF)	Gold	20,000^{^}
United Kingdom (BPI)	3× Platinum	900,000^{^}
Summaries
Europe (IFPI)	Platinum	1,000,000^{*}
^{*} Sales figures based on certification alone.^{^} Shipments figures based on certification alone.

== Release history ==
List of releases of The Love Album
Region	Date
Philippines	13 November 2006
Ireland	20 November 2006
United Kingdom	20 November 2006
Argentina	5 December 2006
