= Spectrum (Westlife album) =

Studio album by Westlife
- Released: 15 November 2019
- Recorded: 2018–2019
- Length: 36:15
- Label: Virgin EMI
- Producer: Steve Mac; Zach Skelton; Jamie Scott; Alex Charles

Westlife chronology
The Love Songs (2014)	Spectrum (2019)	Wild Dreams (2021)

Singles from Spectrum
- 1. "Hello My Love" Released: 10 January 2019; 2. "Better Man" Released: 29 March 2019; 3. "Dynamite" Released: 5 July 2019; 4. "My Blood" Released: 25 October 2019

Spectrum is the eleventh studio album by Irish pop vocal band Westlife, released on 15 November 2019 through Virgin EMI Records. It includes the singles "Hello My Love", "Better Man", "Dynamite" and "My Blood", and features songs co-written by Ed Sheeran, Steve Mac, Ryan Tedder, Camille Purcell, and James Bay. It is the band's first major album in eight years, and their first album under Universal Music Group and Virgin EMI. The album debuted atop the Irish Albums Chart and UK Albums Chart. It is also the biggest selling album of the record label by a UK signed artist in 2019.

== Background ==
After releasing their second Greatest Hits album and tour dates and Westlife announced their breakup in 2011 and made their final appearance together in 2012. On 23 September 2018, it was reported that the group was signed to Universal Music Group and Virgin EMI Records for a new record deal. On 3 October 2018, the group formally announced that there would be new music coming soon. According to reports they had been preparing for the comeback for the previous twelve months. Group member Mark Feehily also said in 2017 that he hoped to get them all together for a proper catch-up. Band members Nicky Byrne and Shane Filan stated about their reunion, "We still have a lot that we want to achieve as a band and we want to bring our new music to fans all over the world."

Byrne expressed in an Instagram post, "It’s an album we thought out in great detail, as grown up men we approached everything very differently. [...] It’s actually the proudest I have ever been about a Westlife album."

== Music, writing and recording ==
The album was recorded in Dublin, London, and Los Angeles with the band saying it "has everything that we love in music, heartfelt emotional songs and also great uptempos that are designed for our stadium performances". They also explained that they "couldn't be happier with how the last few months in the studio have gone".

Recording for the album began in July 2018. In December 2018, the group was pictured working with Daniel Davidsen and Peter Wallevik. In January 2019, Filan said: "We've only got three songs recorded, so we have to get another probably ten [recorded]." In April 2019, they said nine songs had been recorded. One song, "Anywhere", a three-minute "feel-good love song" written by Sheeran and produced by Mac, was slated to be included on the album but was later confirmed not to be included. In May 2019, Egan told in an interview that eight to nine songs they recorded where Sheeran all co-wrote. In July 2019, Feehily added: "One of them is just a very cool tip of the hat to Celtic music. It's very contemporary but it's got a Celtic fusion side to it."

In an interview by Smooth Radio on 10 October 2019, the group said: "We spent 14 months making this album, which is the longest we've ever spent making an album", and "there's probably going to be more singles released off this album than we've ever released off an album, hence the quality that we feel is the strongest". Im another interview by HMV Byrne said: "We worked on the album a lot and over a long time and we were still working on it up until about two months ago. We ended up recording 13 or 14. We thought we might record 30 or 40 and then work it down, but we were so confident about the songs we didn’t need to." On 12 November 2019, they confirmed in a Facebook live video that the album contains three ballads and the song "Take Me There" is uptempo. Their first recorded song for the album was "Better Man" and the last one was recorded just a week in Dublin before the video interview was done.

The title, Spectrum, was chosen because the band said that it is a metaphor for "the various shades and colours of our personalities, vocals and general perspectives" that they feel "somehow join to work perfectly", "it came from us talking about how we feel younger, happier and more energetic than we ever have in our career." The band described the album as "a mix of old and new sound".

== Release and promotion ==
The album pre-order became available in October 2018. The full-length album was released on 15 November 2019, after being moved from its initial planned release date of 6 September, 8 November, 1 January 2020, and 25 December 2020. It was released on CD, and vinyl, as well as a digital download, and for streaming. It is the band's first studio album to be released on vinyl and streaming for its album premiere. On 2 October 2019, it was also announced that they would release a limited box set edition of the album. There are two versions of the album, standard and deluxe, and two bonus tracks on the Japanese version of the album. The album is also bundled with some of their official merchandise.

The band's guest appearances during the album release are on BBC Breakfast on 14 November 2019, BBC Children in Need on 15 November 2019, Strictly Come Dancing on 17 November 2019, This Morning on 18 November 2019, The Late Late Show on 22 November 2019, Lorraine on 25 November 2019, Idol on 6 December 2019, and on Michael McIntyre's Big Show on 7 December 2019. This is their first live promotional appearance in Sweden since 2009. It is also their first live television performances in the said UK and Ireland television shows since 2011.

Spectrum was the "Album of the Week" on BBC Radio 2 for the week of 9 November 2019. The first two singles released have gained 200 million streams globally so far as of July 2019. The tracks have also been the band's most successful radio records. "Hello My Love" has had over 30,000 plays at UK radio to an audience of 275 million, and is one of the most played songs of 2019 on BBC Radio 2. One day before the album release, they published "Without You".

=== Singles ===
The album's lead single, "Hello My Love", was released on 10 January 2019 with its music video on 11 January 2019. It reached number two in Ireland and Scotland, and is their highest charting on their official singles charts since "What About Now" in 2009, ten years ago. The single stayed at number one for two weeks on the UK Physical Chart, the group's highest charting since their 2006 single, "The Rose".

The second single, "Better Man", was released on 29 March 2019 alongside its music video. It became the band's second number-one on the UK Physical Singles Chart and reached number two on the UK Singles Sales Chart and Scottish Singles Chart.

The third single, "Dynamite", was released on 5 July 2019. The music video was shot in Arena Birmingham in the United Kingdom and in Croke Park Stadium in Dublin, Ireland where they performed the song live for the first time.

The fourth single, "My Blood", was announced on 14 September 2019 and released on 25 October 2019. It was written by Mac and Sheeran; Mac previously wrote the band's number-one hits "Swear It Again" and "World of Our Own", while it is the fourth song released by the band written by Sheeran. In an interview with Daily Star on 13 September 2019, Byrne explained: "It's about growing up, it's a love song. You can see Ed is talking about being a parent and watching your child grow up and giving them the best tools to deal with life like bullying." On the same day, BBC Radio 2 have released its playlist for the week and the single premiered as B-List and as the Record of the Week. It was released on 25 October 2019 after being pushed back from 18 October, according to the Daily Mirror. Filming for the music video began on 14 September 2019 in Bray, Ireland and it features the band members' children. The full music video was published on the band's YouTube page on the day of the song's release. "My Blood" ended up peaking at number ninety-six on the UK Singles Chart and becoming their 30th top 100 hit. It also peaked at number six on the Scottish Singles Chart and number forty-six on the Irish Singles Chart. It also peaked at number four in the Irish Digital Songs Sales Chart and number twenty in the Euro Digital Sales Chart.

=== Touring ===
Westlife embarked on their thirteenth concert tour titled The Twenty Tour, which began in May and will conclude in September 2019. The first leg started in Belfast on 22 May 2019 at the SSE Arena before moving throughout mainland Europe and concluding in Dublin at Croke Park on 6 July 2019. The second leg began on 24 July at the IMPACT Arena in Bangkok, Thailand and continues throughout the Asia with multiple dates at each venue. A new concert tour was released and was called, "Stadiums in the Summer", their fourteenth one. The tour will conclude on 29 August 2020 in Cork, Ireland.

== Critical reception ==
Professional ratings
Review scores
Source	Rating
Evening Standard	3/5 stars
Hot Press	6/10

The album received mixed to favorable reviews from music critics. David Smyth from Evening Standard, gave the album three out of five stars and wrote that album "deals with clichés" like the piano schmaltz of the song "Better Man" which according to him "has a cringey stand-up-from-the-stools key change". He also said that the five songs written with Ed Sheeran "pushes them towards a contemporary sound with surprising energy". Edwin McFee from Hot Press wrote that "Spectrum has plenty of stumbles along the way, mind, and features more fluff than the residents of Sesame Street. But on the whole, it marks a bold new chapter for the record-breaking bunch".

== Commercial performance ==
On 22 November 2019, Spectrum debuted atop the UK Albums Chart, becoming Westlife's eighth UK number-one album as well as their first in 12 years and achieving 63,000 total chart sales. The Official Charts Company previously announced that the album had shifted more than 50,000 equivalent units in the United Kingdom after three days of release and predicted that it would debut atop the album chart. According to Music Week, this was the 2019 fifth-highest sale achieved by a number-one album in the UK at that time. Spectrum sold almost as many copies last week as the rest of the top five combined, and more than three times as many copies sold as the No.2 of the said week. The album was certified Silver by the British Phonographic Industry on its opening week and Gold on its fourth week. Its total combined sales in the UK so far is 168,217 according to the Official Charts Company and Musicweek.

In Ireland, Spectrum also became the fastest-selling album of the year and was predicted to debut atop the album chart. The album debuted at number one on the Irish Albums Chart, selling 8,900 units in its first week and becoming the band's eleventh number-one album in the country. It has been certified Platinum by the Irish Recording Music Association.

== Track listing ==
Standard edition
No.	Title	Writer(s)	Producer(s)	Length
1.	"Hello My Love"	Ed Sheeran; Steve Mac	Mac	3:36
2.	"Better Man"	Sheeran; Mac; Wayne Hector; Frederik Gibson	Mac	3:17
3.	"My Blood"	Sheeran; Mac; Hector	Mac	3:18
4.	"Dynamite"	Sheeran; Mac; Andrew Wyatt	Mac	3:32
5.	"Dance"	Luka Kloser; Ryan Tedder; Casey Smith; Zach Skelton	Skelton	2:45
6.	"One Last Time"	Sheeran; Mac	Mac	2:55
7.	"Take Me There"	Mark Feehily; Shane Filan; Camille Purcell; Mac	Mac	3:25
8.	"Repair"	James Bay; Mac	Mac	3:07
9.	"Without You"	Bay; Mac	Mac	3:39
10.	"L.O.V.E."	Feehily; Filan; Purcell; Mac	Mac	2:53
11.	"Another Life"	Alex Charles; Tom Williams	Jamie Scott; Charles	3:49
Total length:				36:15

Japanese bonus tracks
No.	Title	Length
12.	"Dynamite" (Midnight Mix)	4:49
13.	"Hello My Love" (John Gibbons Remix)	3:30
Total length:		44:41

Deluxe edition bonus DVD
No.	Title	Length
1.	"Hello My Love" (music video)	3:45
2.	"Better Man" (music video)	3:18
3.	"Dynamite" (music video)	3:38
Total length:		10:43

== Charts ==
=== Weekly charts ===
Chart (2019)	Peak position
Australian Digital Albums (ARIA)	7
Belgian Albums (Ultratop Flanders)	53
German Albums (Offizielle Top 100)	69
Irish Albums (IRMA)	1
Japan Hot Albums (Billboard Japan)	69
Japanese Albums (Oricon)	108
Scottish Albums (OCC)	1
South African Albums (RISA)	17
Spanish Albums (PROMUSICAE)	79
Swiss Albums (Schweizer Hitparade)	23
Taiwanese Albums (Five Music)	2
UK Albums (OCC)	1

=== Year-end charts ===
Chart (2019)	Position
Irish Albums (IRMA)	14
UK Albums (OCC)	29

== Certifications and sales ==
Region	Certification	Certified units/sales
Ireland (IRMA)	Platinum	15,000^{^}
United Kingdom (BPI)	Gold	100,000^{‡}
Summaries
Worldwide	—	500,000
^{^} Shipments figures based on certification alone.^{‡} Sales+streaming figures based on certification alone.

== Release history ==
Region	Release date	Format	Label
Various	15 November 2019	CD; digital download; streaming; vinyl	Universal Music Group, Virgin EMI
