= The Twenty Tour =

2019 concert tour by Westlife

- Tour by Westlife
- Promotional poster for tour
- Location: Asia; Europe
- Associated album: Spectrum
- Start date: 22 May 2019
- End date: 15 September 2019
- Legs: 4
- No. of shows: 51
- Supporting acts: James Arthur; The Rua; Keelie Walker; Wild Youth; Marion Jola; Yura Yunita
- Attendance: 617,146
- Box office: $55,567,118

Westlife concert chronology
- Greatest Hits Tour (2012); The Twenty Tour (2019); The Wild Dreams Tour (2022-24)

The Twenty Tour was the thirteenth concert tour by Irish pop vocal group, Westlife. It began on 22 May 2019 in Belfast, Northern Ireland at the SSE Arena and concluded on 15 September 2019 in Hyde Park, London, consisting of 33 shows in Europe and 17 shows in Asia. Westlife sold a total of 617,146 tickets for this tour. The tour marked them as the 45th Top Touring Artist, 20th Top Touring Band, 8th Top Touring Pop Group, 7th Top Touring Male Pop Group of 2019 worldwide.

== Background and production ==
On 3 October 2018, the band officially announced their reformation with new music and tour. Later that month, the first confirmed dates of the tour were announced through the band's social networks. Pre-sale for tickets started at 9am GMT on 23 October 2018. Multiple extra dates were later added due to a high demand.

A concert tour date in Croke Park, Dublin, Ireland was recorded and released in March 2020.

== Set list ==
This set list is representative of the 5th July 2019 show in Dublin. It does not represent all dates of the tour.

1. "Hello My Love"
2. "Swear It Again"
3. "What About Now"
4. "My Love"
5. "When You're Looking Like That"
6. "Uptown Girl"
7. "Mandy"
8. "If I Let You Go"
9. "Home"
10. "Better Man"
11. Queen Medley: "Another One Bites the Dust" / "Radio Ga Ga" / "I Want to Break Free" / "Somebody to Love" / "Don't Stop Me Now" / "We Will Rock You" / "We Are the Champions"
12. "I Have a Dream"
13. "Unbreakable"
14. "Fool Again"
15. "Queen of My Heart"
16. "What Makes a Man"
17. "Dynamite"
18. "You Raise Me Up"

Encore

19. "Flying Without Wings"
20. "World of Our Own"

"Dynamite" was performed on the Croke park gigs and on the rest of the tour

== Tour dates ==
List of concerts, showing date, city, country, venue, opening acts, tickets sold, number of available tickets and amount of gross revenue
Date	City	Country	Venue	Opening acts	Attendance	Revenue
Europe
22 May 2019	Belfast	Ireland	SSE Arena	The Rua; Kellie Walker	48,653	$3,018,213
23 May 2019	Belfast	Ireland	SSE Arena	The Rua; Kellie Walker	48,653	$3,018,213
25 May 2019	Belfast	Ireland	SSE Arena	The Rua; Kellie Walker	48,653	$3,018,213
26 May 2019	Belfast	Ireland	SSE Arena	The Rua; Kellie Walker	48,653	$3,018,213
27 May 2019	Belfast	Ireland	SSE Arena	The Rua; Kellie Walker	48,653	$3,018,213
28 May 2019	Glasgow	Scotland	SSE Hydro	The Rua; Kellie Walker	9,837 / 9,964	$748,688
30 May 2019	Manchester	England	Manchester Arena	The Rua; Kellie Walker	13,489 / 13,534	$1,010,160
31 May 2019	Newcastle	England	Utilita Arena Newcastle	The Rua; Kellie Walker	18,412 / 18,412	$1,361,540
1 June 2019	Newcastle	England	Utilita Arena Newcastle	The Rua; Kellie Walker	18,412 / 18,412	$1,361,540
3 June 2019	Glasgow	Scotland	SSE Hydro	The Rua; Kellie Walker	31,992 / 32,295	$2,613,260
4 June 2019	Glasgow	Scotland	SSE Hydro	The Rua; Kellie Walker	31,992 / 32,295	$2,613,260
5 June 2019	Glasgow	Scotland	SSE Hydro	The Rua; Kellie Walker	31,992 / 32,295	$2,613,260
7 June 2019	Sheffield	England	FlyDSA Arena	The Rua; Kellie Walker	20,492	$1,502,414
8 June 2019	Sheffield	England	FlyDSA Arena	The Rua; Kellie Walker	20,492	$1,502,414
10 June 2019	Leeds	England	First Direct Arena	The Rua; Kellie Walker	19,718 / 22,430	$1,445,080
11 June 2019	Leeds	England	First Direct Arena	The Rua; Kellie Walker	19,718 / 22,430	$1,445,080
13 June 2019	London	England	The O_{2} Arena	The Rua; Kellie Walker	42,939 / 46,799	$3,541,420
14 June 2019	London	England	The O_{2} Arena	The Rua; Kellie Walker	42,939 / 46,799	$3,541,420
15 June 2019	London	England	The O_{2} Arena	The Rua; Kellie Walker	42,939 / 46,799	$3,541,420
18 June 2019	Nottingham	England	Motorpoint Arena	The Rua; Kellie Walker	13,576	$974,903
19 June 2019	Nottingham	England	Motorpoint Arena	The Rua; Kellie Walker	13,576	$974,903
21 June 2019	Birmingham	England	Arena Birmingham	The Rua; Kellie Walker	32,818	$2,579,167
22 June 2019	Birmingham	England	Arena Birmingham	The Rua; Kellie Walker	32,818	$2,579,167
23 June 2019	Birmingham	England	Arena Birmingham	The Rua; Kellie Walker	32,818	$2,579,167
25 June 2019	Liverpool	England	M&S Bank Arena	The Rua; Kellie Walker	—	—
26 June 2019	Liverpool	England	M&S Bank Arena	The Rua; Kellie Walker	—	—
28 June 2019	Manchester	England	Manchester Arena	The Rua; Kellie Walker	—	—
29 June 2019	Manchester	England	Manchester Arena	The Rua; Kellie Walker	—	—
1 July 2019	Cardiff	Wales	Motorpoint Arena	The Rua; Kellie Walker	—	—
2 July 2019	Cardiff	Wales	Motorpoint Arena	The Rua; Kellie Walker	—	—
3 July 2019 (Note: The 3 July 2019 show in Nibe, Denmark at Skalskoven is part of the Nibe Festival concert series.)	Nibe	Denmark	Skalskoven	The Rua; Kellie Walker	—	—
5 July 2019	Dublin	Ireland	Croke Park	James Arthur; Wild Youth	148,470	$11,577,344
6 July 2019	Dublin	Ireland	Croke Park	James Arthur; Wild Youth	148,470	$11,577,344
Asia
24 July 2019	Bangkok	Thailand	IMPACT Arena	—N/a	8,500	$1,099,968
26 July 2019 (Note: The 26 July 2019 show in Macau was added due to high demand after concert tickets for July 27 were sold out.)	Macau		Cotai Arena	—N/a	—	—
27 July 2019	Macau		Cotai Arena	—N/a	—	—
28 July 2019	Taipei	Taiwan	Linkou Stadium	—N/a	—	—
29 July 2019 (Note: The 29 July 2019 show in Quezon City, Philippines was added due to high demand after concert tickets for July 30 were sold out.)	Quezon City	Philippines	Smart Araneta Coliseum	—N/a	15,000	$2,469,378
30 July 2019	Quezon City	Philippines	Smart Araneta Coliseum	—N/a	15,000	$2,469,378
6 August 2019 (Note: The 6 August 2019 show in Jakarta, Indonesia was added due to high demand after concert tickets for 7 August were sold out.)	South Tangerang	Indonesia	Indonesia Convention Exhibition	—N/a	—	—
7 August 2019	South Tangerang	Indonesia	Indonesia Convention Exhibition	—N/a	—	—
8 August 2019	Shah Alam	Malaysia	Malawati Stadium	—N/a	—	—
9 August 2019	Shah Alam	Malaysia	Malawati Stadium	—N/a	—	—
10 August 2019	Singapore		Singapore National Stadium	—N/a	20,000	$12,713,822
13 August 2019	Beijing	China	Cadillac Arena	—N/a	—	—
16 August 2019	Shanghai	China	National Exhibition and Convention Center	—N/a	—	—
18 August 2019	Palembang	Indonesia	Stadion Gelora Sriwijaya	Marion Jola	—	—
29 August 2019	Dubai	United Arab Emirates	Coca-Cola Arena	—N/a	—	—
31 August 2019	Magelang	Indonesia	Borobudur Temple	Yura Yunita	8,250	$1,163,085
1 September 2019	Semarang	Indonesia	Sam Poo Kong	—N/a	—	—
Europe
15 September 2019 (Note: The 15 September 2019 show in London at Hyde Park is part of the BBC Radio 2 Live in Hyde Park concert series.)	London	England	Hyde Park	—N/a	—	—

== Personnel ==
=== Vocals ===
- Shane Filan
- Mark Feehily
- Kian Egan
- Nicky Byrne

=== Band ===
- Simon Ellis - Keyboards / Musical Director
- Phil Short - Guitar
- Freddie Thompson - Bass
- Jonathan "Ginger" Hamilton - Drums

=== Crew ===
- Brian Burke - Tour Director & Production Designer
- Simon Ellis - Musical Director
