= Unbreakable – The Greatest Hits Volume 1 =

2002 greatest hits album by Westlife

Unbreakable – The Greatest Hits, Volume 1

Greatest hits album by Westlife
- Released: 11 November 2002
- Recorded: 1998–2002
- Studios: Rokstone Studios London; Cheiron Studios, Stockholm, Sweden; PWL Studios, London; Windmill Lane Studios, Ireland; Olympic Studios, London
- Genres: Pop; teen pop
- Length: 77:56
- Label: Sony BMG

Westlife chronology
World of Our Own (2001)	Unbreakable – The Greatest Hits, Volume 1 (2002)	Turnaround (2003)

Singles from Unbreakable – The Greatest Hits Volume 1
- 1. "Unbreakable" Released: 27 September 2002; 2. "Tonight / Miss You Nights" Released: 23 March 2003

Unbreakable – The Greatest Hits, Volume 1 is the first greatest hits album by Irish boy band Westlife. The album was released on 11 November 2002. The album consists of all of the group's past singles along with six new songs. Hit single "Flying Without Wings" was re-recorded as a duet with South Korean singer BoA and Mexican singer Cristian Castro, and each respective duet was included on the Asian and Spanish editions of the album respectively. The first single released from the album was "Unbreakable", a UK number-one single. The second single, the double A-side "Tonight" / "Miss You Nights" peaked at number three in the UK and at number one in Ireland.

Unbreakable peaked at number one in the UK and sold 2 million copies in the UK alone. The album was the ninth best-selling album of 2002 in the UK. It is also the band's biggest selling album and their longest charting album. The album spent 55 weeks on the UK top 100 albums chart. It was the fifth best-selling album of 2002 in Ireland. In October 2008, IFPI announced that the album was certified 2× Platinum, exceeding two million sales in Europe. In total the album has sold over 3 million copies worldwide.

In 2008, the album was re-issued in New Zealand, titled Unbreakable: The Greatest Hits – 2008 NZ Tour Edition. The package features the album plus the Live at Wembley 2006 concert DVD. It peaked at No. 1 on the albums chart there, and achieved 2× Platinum status, with more than 30,000 copies sold. The album finished at No. 19 on the 2008 New Zealand year-end chart.

== Track listing ==
Track no.	Title	Credits	Length
1	"Swear It Again" from Westlife	produced, arranged by, mixed by Steve Mac written by Mac, Wayne Hector	4:07
2	"If I Let You Go" from Westlife	produced, arranged by David Kreuger, Per Magnusson written by Jörgen Elofsson, Magnusson, Kreuger	3:41
3	"Flying Without Wings" from Westlife	produced, arranged by, mixed by Mac written by Mac, Hector	3:36
4	"I Have a Dream" from Westlife	produced Dan Frampton, Pete Waterman remix, producer [Additional] John Holliday, Trevor Steel written by B. Andersson, B. Ulvaeus	4:15
5	"Fool Again" (2000 remix) from Westlife	produced, arranged by, programmed by Kreuger, Magnusson written by Elofsson, Magnusson, Kreuger	3:53
6	"Against All Odds" from Coast to Coast	produced Mariah Carey, Mac vocals featuring, vocals arranged by Carey written by Phil Collins	3:21
7	"My Love" from Coast to Coast	produced, arranged by Kreuger, Magnusson written by Elofsson, Pelle Nylén, David Kreuger, Per Magnusson	3:53
8	"What Makes a Man" from Coast to Coast	produced by Mac written by Mac, Hector	3:52
9	"Uptown Girl" from Coast to Coast	produced, arranged by, mixed by Mac written by Billy Joel	3:07
10	"Queen of My Heart" from World of Our Own	produced, arranged by, mixed by Mac written by McLaughlin, Robson, Mac, Hector	4:19
11	"World of Our Own" from World of Our Own	produced, arranged by Mac; Mastered by Ted Jensen remix, additional producer Andy Zulla, Stevie 2 Bars written by Mac, Hector, Dennis Morgan, Simon Climie	3:32
12	"Bop Bop Baby" from World of Our Own	produced, arranged by, mixed by Mac written by McFadden, Filan, Murphy, O'Brien	4:30
13	"When You're Looking Like That" from Coast to Coast	produced, engineer Rami Yacoub written by Rami, Andreas Carlsson, Max Martin	3:54
14	"Unbreakable"	produced, arranged by, mixed by Mac written by Mac, Jörgen Elofsson, John Reid	4:33
15	"Written in the Stars"	produced, recorded by David Stenmarck, Nick Jarl written by Nick Jarl, Stenmarck, Andreas Carlsson	4:10
16	"How Does It Feel"	produced, arranged by, mixed by Mac written by McFadden, Filan, Romdhane, Larossi	4:19
17	"Tonight"	produced, arranged by, mixed by Mac written by Mac, Hector, Elofsson	4:32
18	"Love Takes Two"	produced, arranged by, mixed by Mac written by Mac, Hector, Diane Warren	3:49
19	"Miss You Nights"	produced, arranged by, mixed by Mac written by Dave Townsend	3:11
Bonus tracks
8	"I Lay My Love on You" from Coast to Coast (2000)	Replaces "What Makes A Man" on Australian / Asian Edition produced, arranged by Kreuger, Magnusson written by Elofsson, Magnusson, Kreuger	3:29
11	"World of Our Own" (US Mix) from World of Our Own (2001)	Replaces the original "World of Our Own" on the Asian Edition produced, arranged by Mac mastered by Ted Jensen remix, additional producers Andy Zulla, Stevie 2 Bars written by Mac, Hector, Morgan, Climie	3:28
20	"Flying Without Wings" (Featuring BoA)	Additional track on the Asian Edition produced, arranged by, mixed by Mac written by Mac, Hector [featuring] vocals arranged by BoA	3:36
20.2	"Flying Without Wings" (Featuring Cristian Castro)	Additional track on the Spanish Edition produced, arranged by, mixed by Mac written by Mac, Hector [featuring] vocals arranged by Castro	3:36

Additional Bonus Disc (available at Woolworths via a Daily Mirror promotion)

1. "World of Our Own" (US Mix) - 3:30 from World of Our Own (2001)
2. "More Than Words" - 3:58 from Westlife (1999)
3. "Forever" - 5:05 from Westlife (1999), Swear It Again EP
4. "You Don't Know" - 4:12 from World of Our Own
5. "Interview With Westlife" - 5:00

== Charts ==
=== Weekly charts ===
Weekly chart performance for Unbreakable – The Greatest Hits Volume 1
Chart (2002)	Peak position
Australian Albums (ARIA)	66
Austrian Albums (Ö3 Austria)	14
Belgian Albums (Ultratop Flanders)	27
Danish Albums (Hitlisten)	4
Dutch Albums (Album Top 100)	3
European Albums Chart	3
German Albums (Offizielle Top 100)	7
Greek Albums (IFPI)	42
Irish Albums (IRMA)	1
Japanese Albums (Oricon)	18
New Zealand Albums (RMNZ)	1
Norwegian Albums (VG-lista)	10
Scottish Albums (OCC)	1
Singaporean Albums (RIAS)	1
South Korean Albums (RIAK)	1
Swedish Albums (Sverigetopplistan)	2
Swiss Albums (Schweizer Hitparade)	14
UK Albums (Official Charts)	1

=== Year-end charts ===
Year-end chart performance for Unbreakable – The Greatest Hits Volume 1
Chart (2002)	Position
Irish Albums (IRMA)	5
UK Albums (OCC)	8
Worldwide Albums (IFPI)	37
Chart (2008)	Position
UK Albums (OCC)	79
New Zealand Albums	19

=== Decade-end charts ===
Decade-end chart performance for Unbreakable – The Greatest Hits Volume 1
Chart (2000–2009)	Position
UK Albums (OCC)	42

== Certifications ==
Region	Certification	Certified units/sales
Denmark (IFPI Danmark)	Platinum	50,000^{^}
Ireland (IRMA)	8× Platinum	120,000^{^}
Germany (BVMI)	Gold	150,000^{^}
Mexico (AMPROFON)	Gold	75,000^{^}
Netherlands (NVPI)	Gold	40,000^{^}
New Zealand (RMNZ)	Platinum	15,000^{^}
Norway (IFPI Norway)	Gold	20,000^{*}
Sweden (GLF)	Platinum	60,000^{^}
Switzerland (IFPI Switzerland)	Gold	20,000^{^}
United Kingdom (BPI)	6× Platinum	1,943,553
Summaries
Europe (IFPI)	2× Platinum	2,000,000^{*}
^{*} Sales figures based on certification alone.^{^} Shipments figures based on certification alone.

== Video release ==
Unbreakable: The Greatest Hits Volume 1

Video by Westlife
- Released: 15 November 2002
- Genre: Pop
- Length: 158
- Label: Sony BMG
- Director: Brett Turnbull

Westlife chronology
World of Our Own (2002)	Unbreakable: The Greatest Hits Volume 1 (2002)	Unbreakable: The Greatest Hits (2003)

A DVD containing the music videos of the group's greatest hits was one of the five best-selling music DVDs of 2002 and BMG's fourth biggest-selling concert music DVDs the same year.

=== Track listing ===
1. "Swear It Again"
2. "If I Let You Go"
3. "Flying Without Wings"
4. "Seasons In The Sun"
5. "I Have A Dream"
6. "Fool Again"
7. "My Love"
8. "What Makes A Man"
9. "Uptown Girl"
10. "I Lay My Love On You"
11. "When You're Looking Like That"
12. "Queen Of My Heart"
13. "Angel"
14. "World Of Our Own"
15. "Bop Bop Baby"
16. "Unbreakable"

Bonus features include an interactive documentary, hidden outtakes, studio sessions, and US versions of music videos for "Swear It Again" and "World Of Our Own".

=== Chart performance ===
Chart	Peak position
Ireland	1
UK Music Video Chart	1
UK DVD Chart (OCC)	51
UK Video Chart (OCC)	30

=== Certifications and sales ===
Region	Certification	Certified units/sales
United Kingdom (BPI)	3× Platinum	150,000^{*}
^{*} Sales figures based on certification alone.
