= Dynamite (Westlife song) =

2019 single by Westlife

- Cover artwork for 'Midnight Mix'

Single by Westlife

from the album Spectrum
- Released: 5 July 2019
- Recorded: 2019
- Genre: Pop, EDM
- Length: 3:32
- Label: Virgin EMI
- Songwriters: Edward Christopher Sheeran; Steve Mac; Andrew Wyatt
- Producers: Steve Mac (Original Mix and Cahill Remix); Red Triangle (Midnight Mix); Mark Feehily (Midnight Mix)

Westlife singles chronology
"Better Man" (2019)	"Dynamite" (2019)	"My Blood" (2019)

Music video
- "Dynamite" on YouTube

"Dynamite" is a song by Irish pop vocal band Westlife. It was released on 5 July 2019 as the third single from Westlife's eleventh studio album Spectrum. It is their third single released under Universal Music Group and Virgin EMI Records. This is released on band member Shane Filan's fortieth birthday. This is written by Ed Sheeran, Steve Mac, and Andrew Wyatt.

The song peaked at number ten in the Scottish Singles Chart.

== Background ==
"Dynamite" is the third single released from their album Spectrum and like the previous two singles from the album was written by Ed Sheeran, Steve Mac and Andrew Wyatt. Steve also produced the single, his third one from Spectrum. Remixes of "Dynamite" were produced by Red Triangle and band member Mark Feehily, marking the first time Mark has ever had a production credit on Westlife song.

In an interview, the band said, “Dynamite has got such an enchanting melody that starts off subtly and ends up quite big and euphoric. It’s about how falling in love creates such glow and light in someone’s life that it literally lights up the world around them. It’s an upbeat, fresh summer song and you could say it reflects the energy of our comeback."

The first live television performance of the single happened in The One Show on 13 September 2019.

The track was included in the disc 2 number 40 of Now That's What I Call Music! 104 to be released on 8 November 2019. It is the third time in 2019 for a Westlife single to be included in the popular compilation album after "Hello My Love", and "Better Man".

This song is in the key of D major, transposing up a minor second to Eb major for the last chorus. The vocal range of the song ranges from A2 (Shane) to Bb4 (Mark).

== Music video ==
The official music video of "Dynamite" was premiered on the group's official YouTube and Vevo channel on 23 August 2019. The music video features footage from their concert at Dublin's Croke Park Stadium on 6 July 2019. The music video was shot in Arena Birmingham in the United Kingdom and in Croke Park in the Republic of Ireland where they performed the song live for the first time.

== Formats and track listings ==
- Digital download / streaming
1. "Dynamite" – 3:32
- Streaming (Spotify)
1. "Dynamite" – 3:32
2. "Hello My Love" – 3:34
3. "Better Man" – 3:16
- Digital download / streaming
1. "Dynamite" (Midnight Mix) – 4:48
- Streaming (Spotify)
1. "Dynamite" (Midnight Mix) – 4:48
2. "Dynamite" – 3:32
- Digital download / streaming
1. "Dynamite" (Cahill Remix) - 3:31

== Credits and personnel ==
Credits adapted from YouTube.

=== Original Mix and Cahill Remix ===
- Westlife (Kian Egan, Mark Feehily, Nicky Byrne, Shane Filan) – vocals, associated performer
- Ed Sheeran – songwriting
- Steve Mac – production, songwriting, keyboards, piano
- Andrew Wyatt – bass, songwriting
- Chris Laws – drums, engineering, programming
- Dann Pursey – engineering, programming
- John Hanes – mixing engineer
- Serban Ghenea – mixing
- Dave Arch – strings, arranger
- Dick Beetham – mastering
- Duncan Fuller – engineering
- Mike Horner - engineering
- Cahill - remixer

=== Midnight Mix ===
- Westlife (Kian Egan, Mark Feehily, Nicky Byrne, Shane Filan) – vocals, associated performer
- Ed Sheeran – composer, lyricist
- Steve Mac – composer, lyricist
- Andrew Wyatt – bass
- Mark Feehily – producer
- Rick Parkhouse – acoustic guitar, associated performer, programming
- George Tizzard – acoustic guitar, associated performer, programming
- Dick Beetham – mastering engineer, studio personnel
- Red Triangle – mixer, producer

== Charts ==
Chart (2019)	Peak position
China Airplay/FL (Billboard)	16
Ireland (IRMA)	27
Scotland Singles (OCC)	10
South Korea (Gaon Weekly BGM Chart)	11
UK Singles Downloads (OCC)	14

== Release history ==
Region	Date	Format	Version	Label
Various	5 July 2019	Airplay, streaming, digital download	Standard	Universal Music Group, Virgin EMI
Various	26 July 2019	Digital download, streaming	Midnight Mix	Universal Music Group, Virgin EMI
Japan	9 August 2019	Digital download, streaming	Cahill Remix	Universal Music Group, Virgin EMI
Various	28 August 2019	Digital download, streaming	Cahill Remix	Universal Music Group, Virgin EMI
