= World of Our Own =

Studio album by Westlife
- Released: 12 November 2001
- Recorded: 2000–2001; Rokstone Studios, London; Windmill Lane Studios, Ireland; Olympic Studios, London; C&N Studios, Stockholm, Sweden; Cheiron Studios, Stockholm, Sweden
- Genres: Pop, Dance rock
- Length: 76:35
- Labels: RCA, BMG
- Producers: Simon Cowell (exec.), Cutfather & Joe, Andrew Frampton, Julian Gallagher, Steve Kipner, David Kreuger, Josef Larossi, Steve Mac, Per Magnusson, Andreas "Quiz" Romdhane, Richard Stannard

Westlife chronology
Coast to Coast (2000)	World of Our Own (2001)	Unbreakable – The Greatest Hits Volume 1 (2002)

Alternative cover
- European cover

Singles from World of Our Own
- 1. "Uptown Girl" Released: 5 March 2001; 2. "Queen of My Heart" Released: 5 November 2001; 3. "World of Our Own" Released: 18 February 2002; 4. "Bop Bop Baby" Released: 20 May 2002

Professional ratings
Review scores
Source	Rating
Blender	2/5 stars
MTV Asia	7/10

World of Our Own is the third studio album recorded by Irish boy band Westlife. It was released through RCA Records on 12 November 2001. It reached number one in the United Kingdom and includes the singles "Queen of My Heart" (which was a double A-side with "When You're Looking Like That"), "World of Our Own" (which was a double A-side with "Angel"), "Bop Bop Baby", and the final single from the group's last album, "Uptown Girl". "Evergreen" was later covered by Will Young as his winner's single for the 2002 Pop Idol competition.

The album went 4× Platinum in the UK and is the fourteenth biggest selling boy band album ever in the UK. The album was one of the best selling international albums in Hong Kong in 2002. In January 2005, the album was re-released in a 2-in-1 box set with the group's previous album, Coast to Coast.

The album sold over 5.5 million copies worldwide.

== Background ==
The band spent four months making this album and wrote seven songs on it. The album cover was shot in Dublin.

"Uptown Girl" was recorded by the band as a part of the 2001 Comic Relief charity single. It was released on 5 March 2001. "Queen of My Heart" was released on 5 November 2001 as the first single from this album. In an interview, Kian said that the song was about a person who wants to go back to their soulmate whom they have been away from each other for a long time. "World of Our Own" was released on 18 February 2002 as the second single from this album. The band described it as a 'poppy' song. "Bop Bop Baby" was released on 20 May 2002 as the third single from this album.

Bonus track "Bad Girls" was originally intended to be recorded by Luis Fonsi.

== World of Our Own Tour ==
The World of Our Own Tour saw Westlife touring the UK and Europe in 2002. The tour centered on a space theme with giant globes for the band's entrance.

== Track listing ==
World of Our Own — UK/Europe Standard version
No.	Title	Writer(s)	Producer(s)	Length
1.	"Queen of My Heart (Radio Edit)"	Steve Mac, Wayne Hector, John McLaughlin, Steve Robson	Mac	4:20
2.	"Bop Bop Baby"	Brian McFadden, Shane Filan, Graham Murphy, Christopher O'Brien	Mac	4:23
3.	"I Cry"	Jörgen Elofsson, Per Magnusson, David Kreuger	Kreuger, Magnusson	4:12
4.	"Why Do I Love You"	Elofsson, Magnusson, Kreuger	Kreuger, Magnusson	3:40
5.	"I Wanna Grow Old with You"	Mac, Nicky Byrne, Kian Egan, Markus Feehily, Filan, McFadden, Elofsson, Richard Marx	Mac	4:09
6.	"Evergreen"	Elofsson, Magnusson, Kreuger	Kreuger, Magnusson	4:05
7.	"World of Our Own"	Mac, Hector, Dennis Morgan, Simon Climie	Mac	3:33
8.	"To Be Loved"	Mac, Hector, Willy Russell	Mac	3:21
9.	"Drive (for All Time)"	Mac, Hector, Elofsson	Mac	3:28
10.	"If Your Heart's Not in It"	Steve Kipner, Andrew Frampton	Kipner, Frampton	4:21
11.	"When You Come Around"	Byrne, Egan, Richard Stannard, Julian Gallagher, Ash Howes, Martin Harrington	Stannard, Gallagher	3:42
12.	"Don't Say It's Too Late"	McFadden, Filan, Andreas "Quiz" Romdhane, Josef Larossi	Romdhane, Larossi	4:13
13.	"Don't Let Me Go"	Byrne, Egan, Gallagher, Howes, Harrington, Stannard, Sharon Murphy, Dave Morgan	Stannard, Gallagher	3:30
14.	"Walk Away"	Krueger, Magnusson, Carlsson, Pelle Nylén	Krueger, Magnusson	4:00
15.	"Love Crime"	McFadden, Filan, Romdhane, Larossi	Romdhane, Larossi	3:18
16.	"Imaginary Diva"	Egan, Byrne, Mark Feehily	Cutfather & Joe	3:41
17.	"Angel"	Sarah McLachlan	Mac	4:24

World of Our Own — European second re-issue version (bonus track)
No.	Title	Writer(s)	Producer(s)	Length
18.	"When You're Looking Like That (Single Remix)"	Rami, Andreas Carlsson, Max Martin	Rami	3:52

World of Our Own — Japanese edition bonus track
No.	Title	Writer(s)	Producer(s)	Length
18.	"Bad Girls"	Romdhane, Larossi, Clyde Lieberman, Savan Kotecha	Romdhane, Larossi	3:22
19.	"I Promise You That"	Nick Jarl, Patric Jonsson, Lilli Sjöberg	Jarl, Jonsson, Pär Åström	3:35

World of Our Own — Re-issue Version/Streaming Expanded Edition
No.	Title	Writer(s)	Producer(s)	Length
1.	"Queen of My Heart" (Radio Edit)	Steve Mac, Wayne Hector, John McLaughlin, Steve Robson	Mac	4:20
2.	"Bop Bop Baby"	Brian McFadden, Shane Filan, Graham Murphy, Christopher O'Brien	Mac	4:23
3.	"I Cry"	Jörgen Elofsson, Per Magnusson, David Kreuger	Kreuger, Magnusson	4:12
4.	"Uptown Girl" (Radio Edit)	Billy Joel	Mac	3:08
5.	"Why Do I Love You"	Elofsson, Magnusson, Kreuger	Kreuger, Magnusson	3:40
6.	"I Wanna Grow Old with You"	Mac, Byrne, Feehily, McFadden, Filan, Kian Egan, Elofsson, Richard Marx	Mac	4:09
7.	"When You're Looking Like That" (Single Remix)	Rami, Andreas Carlsson, Max Martin	Rami	3:54
8.	"Evergreen"	Elofsson, Magnusson, Kreuger	Kreuger, Magnusson	4:05
9.	"World of Our Own"	Mac, Hector, Dennis Morgan, Simon Climie	Mac	3:33
10.	"To Be Loved"	Mac, Hector, Willy Russell	Mac	3:21
11.	"Drive (for All Time)"	Mac, Hector, Elofsson	Mac	3:28
12.	"If Your Heart's Not in It"	Steve Kipner, Andrew Frampton	Kipner, Frampton	4:21
13.	"When You Come Around"	Egan, Nicky Byrne, Richard Stannard, Julian Gallagher, Ash Howes, Martin Harrington	Stannard, Gallagher	3:42
14.	"Don't Say It's Too Late"	McFadden, Filan, Andreas "Quiz" Romdhane, Josef Larossi	Romdhane, Larossi	4:13
15.	"Don't Let Me Go"	Egan, Byrne, Stannard, Gallagher, Howes, Harrington, Sharon Murphy, Dave Morgan	Stannard, Gallagher	3:30
16.	"Walk Away"	Krueger, Magnusson, Carlsson, Pelle Nylén	Krueger, Magnusson	4:00
17.	"Love Crime"	McFadden, Filan, Romdhane, Larossi	Romdhane, Larossi	3:18
18.	"Imaginary Diva"	Egan, Byrne, Mark Feehily	Cutfather & Joe	3:41
19.	"Angel"	Sarah McLachlan	Mac	4:24
20.	"Bad Girls" (Hidden CD Bonus Track)	Romdhane, Larossi, Clyde Lieberman, Savan Kotecha	Romdhane, Larossi	3:22

World of Our Own — Asian deluxe edition bonus disc
No.	Title	Writer(s)	Producer(s)	Length
1.	"Bop Bop Baby (Almighty Radio Edit)"	McFadden, Filan, Murphy, O'Brien	Mac, Almighty	3:55
2.	"Bad Girls"	Andreas Romdhane, Josef Larossi, Lieberman, Kotecha	Romdhane, Larossi	3:22
3.	"I Promise You That"	Nick Jarl, Patric Jonsson, Lilli Sjöberg	Jarl, Jonsson, Pär Åström	3:35
4.	"My Private Movie"	Kipner, David Kopatz, Jack Kugell	Cutfather & Joe	4:05
5.	"Don't Get Me Wrong"	Jake, Mike Hofsten	Steve Mac	3:45
6.	"Crying Girl"	McFadden, Hector, McLaughlin, Robson	Steve Robson	3:42
7.	"You Don't Know" (McFadden and Feehily only)	McFadden, Filan, Egan, Byrne, Feehily	Christopher O'Brien, Graham Murphy	4:15
8.	"Reason for Living"	McFadden, Filan, Egan, Byrne, Feehily	Steve Mac	3:50

World of Our Own — Asian special edition bonus VCD
No.	Title	Length
1.	"My Love"	3:55
2.	"Uptown Girl"	3:40
3.	"What Makes a Man"	4:02
4.	"I Lay My Love on You"	3:35
5.	"Queen of My Heart"	4:25
6.	"World of Our Own"	3:40
7.	"Angel"	4:32
8.	"Bop Bop Baby"	4:57

== Personnel ==
- Acoustic Guitar, Guitar [Electric] - Esbjörn Öhrwall (tracks: 5, 8, 16)
- Arranged By [Strings] - Dave Arch (tracks: 6, 10, 19)
- Arranged By [Strings], Conductor [Strings] - Henrik Janson (tracks: 3, 5, 16), Ulf Janson (tracks: 3, 5, 16)
- Artwork By [Design & Art Direction] - root
- Backing Vocals [Additional] - Anders von Hofsten (tracks: 3, 5, 8, 14, 16, 17), Wayne Hector (tracks: 1, 5, 7 to 9)
- Bass - Steve Pearce (tracks: 1, 2, 6, 9 to 11, 19), Tomas Lindberg (tracks: 4, 12, 14, 15)
- Drums - Chris Laws (tracks: 1, 2, 6, 9, 11)
- Engineer - Chris Laws (tracks: 1, 2, 6, 9 to 11, 19)
- Engineer [Assistant] - Daniel Pursey (tracks: 1, 2, 6, 9 to 11, 19), Phillipe Rose (tracks: 6, 9 to 11, 19), Quentin Guiné (tracks: 1, 2, 6, 8 to 11, 19)
- Engineer [Mix] - Matt Howe (tracks: 1, 2, 6, 9 to 11)
- Engineer [Protool] - Chris Laws (tracks: 1, 2, 19), Lee McCutcheon (tracks: 1, 2, 19)
- Executive Producer - Simon Cowell
- Guitar - Fredrick "Frizzy" Karlsson (tracks: 1, 5, 9 to 11), Paul Gendler (tracks: 1, 2, 6, 9)
- Keyboards - Per Magnusson (tracks: 3, 5, 8, 16)
- Mastered By - Björn Engelmann Cutting Room Studios (tracks: 3, 4, 8, 14, 16 to 18), Dick Beetham (tracks: 1, 2, 6, 9 to 13, 15, 19)
- Mixed By - Bernard Löhr (tracks: 3, 6, 10, 18)
- Photography - Sandrine Dulermo
- Recorded By [Strings] - Fredrik Andersson (tracks: 3, 6, 18)
- Strings - Stockholm Session Strings (tracks: 3, 5, 14, 16)

== Charts ==
=== Weekly charts ===
Chart (2001–2002)	Peak position
Australian Albums (ARIA)	80
Austrian Albums (Ö3 Austria)	9
Belgian Albums (Ultratop Flanders)	8
Danish Albums (Hitlisten)	3
Dutch Albums (Album Top 100)	10
European Albums Chart	5
French Albums (SNEP)	141
German Albums (Offizielle Top 100)	8
Greek Albums (IFPI)	8
Icelandic Albums (Tónlist)	1
Irish Albums (IRMA)	1
Italian Albums (FIMI)	68
Japanese Albums (Oricon)	18
Malaysian Albums (IFPI)	3
New Zealand Albums (RMNZ)	3
Norwegian Albums (VG-lista)	7
Scottish Albums (Official Charts)	1
Singaporean Albums (RIAS)	1
South African Albums (RISA)	19
Swedish Albums (Sverigetopplistan)	1
Swiss Albums (Schweizer Hitparade)	19
UK Albums (Official Charts)	1

Chart (2022)	Peak position
Irish Albums (IRMA)	31

=== Year-end charts ===
Chart (2001)	Position
Dutch Albums (Album Top 100)	92
Irish Albums (IRMA)	3
Swedish Albums (Sverigetopplistan)	7
UK Albums (OCC)	12
Worldwide Albums (IFPI)	35

Chart (2002)	Position
Austrian Albums (Ö3 Austria)	40
Dutch Albums (Album Top 100)	92
European Albums (Eurochart Hot 100)	25
German Albums (Offizielle Top 100)	33
New Zealand Albums (RMNZ)	10
Swedish Albums (Sverigetopplistan)	54
UK Albums (OCC)	53

== Certifications ==
Certifications for World Of Our Own
Region	Certification	Certified units/sales
Austria (IFPI Austria)	Gold	20,000^{*}
Chile	Gold	10,000
Denmark (IFPI Danmark)	Platinum	50,000^{^}
Germany (BVMI)	Gold	150,000^{^}
Netherlands (NVPI)	Gold	40,000^{^}
New Zealand (RMNZ)	2× Platinum	30,000^{^}
Norway (IFPI Norway)	Platinum	50,000^{*}
South Africa (RISA)	Platinum	50,000^{*}
Sweden (GLF)	Platinum	80,000^{^}
Switzerland (IFPI Switzerland)	Gold	20,000^{^}
United Kingdom (BPI)	4× Platinum	1,200,000^{^}
Summaries
Europe (IFPI)	2× Platinum	2,000,000^{*}
Worldwide	—	5,500,000
^{*} Sales figures based on certification alone.^{^} Shipments figures based on certification alone.

== Release history ==
World of Our Own release history
Region	Date
Taiwan	1 November 2001
Europe	12 November 2001
Australia	3 December 2001
