= Bop Bop Baby =

2002 single by Westlife

Single by Westlife

from the album World of Our Own
- Released: 20 May 2002
- Studio: Rokstone (London, England)
- Length: 4:22 (LP version); 4:30 (single remix)
- Label: BMG; RCA; S
- Songwriters: Brian McFadden; Shane Filan; Graham Murphy; Chris O'Brien
- Producer: Steve Mac

Westlife singles chronology
"World of Our Own" (2002)	"Bop Bop Baby" (2002)	"Unbreakable" (2002)

Music video
- "Bop Bop Baby" on YouTube

"Bop Bop Baby" is a song by Irish boy band Westlife and it was released on 20 May 2002 as the third and final single from their third studio album, World of Our Own (2001). The single peaked at number five on the UK Singles Chart; during an interview, the band claimed this was due to the obscure choice of single, as they would have much preferred to release "Why Do I Love You", for which they had recorded a video. It is the band's 18th-best-selling single in paid-for sales and in combined sales in the United Kingdom as of January 2019. Billboard named the single one of the "Top 15 Underrated Boy Band Jams" in 2015.

== Background ==
The song was written by band members Brian McFadden and Shane Filan alongside Graham Murphy and Chris O'Brien. This is their first song co-written by the band members that was released as a single. McFadden said that he got inspired to write the lyrics after watching a Beach Boys documentary. It was composed in the traditional verse–chorus form in D major, with McFadden, Filan, and Mark Feehily's vocals ranging from the chords of G_{3} to A_{5}.

== Music video ==
The video for "Bop Bop Baby" was initially to be directed by Vaughn Arnell and was to feature the band in front of the Irish skyline. Instead, the video was directed by Max & Dania. The video was supposed to have Naomi Campbell as the leading lady, but she cancelled her participation at the last minute, and Leah Wood took over. The video was filmed at the University of Hertfordshire and took 32 hours to film. There were 25 extras on set, seven stuntmen, two horses, and Janty Yates (the costume designer for Russell Crowe's box office smash Gladiator).

The video is set during the Medieval times. At the start of the video, it is said that a beautiful maiden wishes to marry for love, but her father wants her to marry Duke Vincent (Vinnie Jones), the vilest man in the kingdom for money. The band members serve as Musketeers who are imprisoned in a dungeon by the Duke. McFadden attempts to approach a nearby prisoner but is scared off. The five members then break free, riding on horses, they arrive at the wedding and battle the Duke's men. At one point, Kian Egan and Feehily nearly slash each other, screaming in the process before they got attacked by the Duke. The band members then attack the Duke before fleeing the church with the maiden with the Duke in pursuit. Billboard called the video "unintentionally hilarious" as well as a "riotous masterpiece".

== Track listings ==
UK CD1

1. "Bop Bop Baby" (single remix)
2. "You Don't Know"
3. "Imaginary Diva" (Orphans remix)
4. "Bop Bop Baby" (CD ROM video)

UK CD2

1. "Bop Bop Baby" (single remix)
2. "Bop Bop Baby" (Almighty radio edit)
3. Band interviews (CD ROM)

UK cassette single

1. "Bop Bop Baby" (single remix)
2. "You Don't Know"
3. "Imaginary Diva" (Orphans remix)

European CD single

1. "Bop Bop Baby"
2. "You Don't Know"

Australian CD single

1. "Bop Bop Baby" (single remix)
2. "Bop Bop Baby" (Almighty radio edit)
3. "Bad Girls"
4. Video excerpts and band interviews

== Credits and personnel ==
Credits are lifted from the Unbreakable – The Greatest Hits Volume 1 album booklet.

Studios

- Engineered at Rokstone Studios (London, England), Windmill Lane (Dublin, Ireland), and Olympic Studios (London, England)
- Mastered at Transfermation (London, England)

Personnel

- Brian McFadden – writing
- Shane Filan – writing
- Graham Murphy – writing
- Chris O'Brien – writing
- Paul Gendler – guitars
- Steve Pearce – bass
- Dave Arch – Hammond organ
- Steve Mac – keyboards, production, arrangement, mixing
- Chris Laws – drums, engineering, Pro Tools engineering
- Matt Howe – mix engineering
- Daniel Pursey – assistant engineering
- Quentin Guiné – assistant engineering
- Lee McCutcheon – Pro Tools engineering
- Richard Dowling – mastering

== Charts ==
=== Weekly charts ===
Chart (2002)	Peak position
Australia (ARIA)	56
Austria (Ö3 Austria Top 40)	28
Belgium (Ultratop 50 Flanders)	50
Czech Republic (IFPI)	30
Denmark (Tracklisten)	3
Europe (Eurochart Hot 100)	12
Europe (European Hit Radio)	11
Germany (GfK)	15
Ireland (IRMA)	4
Italy (FIMI)	45
Latvia (Latvijas Top 40)	14
Netherlands (Dutch Top 40)	21
Netherlands (Single Top 100)	23
New Zealand (Recorded Music NZ)	21
Poland Airplay (PiF PaF)	2
Romania (Romanian Top 100)	13
Scottish Singles Sales (Official Charts)	5
Sweden (Sverigetopplistan)	16
Switzerland (Schweizer Hitparade)	36
UK Singles (Official Charts)	5
UK Airplay (Music Week)	9

=== Year-end charts ===
Chart (2002)	Position
Europe (European Hit Radio)	82
Ireland (IRMA)	61

== Certifications ==
Region	Certification	Certified units/sales
United Kingdom (BPI)	Silver	200,000^{‡}
^{‡} Sales+streaming figures based on certification alone.

== Release history ==
Region	Date	Format(s)	Label(s)	Ref(s).
Sweden	20 May 2002	CD	BMG; RCA; S	
United Kingdom	20 May 2002	CD; cassette	BMG; RCA; S	
Australia	15 July 2002	CD	BMG; RCA; S	
New Zealand	5 August 2002	CD	BMG; RCA; S	
