= Better Man (Westlife song) =

2019 single by Westlife

Single by Westlife

from the album Spectrum
- Released: 29 March 2019 (original and orchestral); 26 April 2019 (acoustic)
- Length: 3:17 (original); 3:23 (orchestral); 3:13 (acoustic)
- Label: Virgin EMI
- Songwriters: Ed Sheeran; Fred Again; Steve Mac; Wayne Hector
- Producers: Steve Mac (original and acoustic); Tobie Tripp (orchestral)

Westlife singles chronology
"Hello My Love" (2019)	"Better Man" (2019)	"Dynamite" (2019)

Music video
- "Better Man" on YouTube

"Better Man" is a song by Irish pop vocal band Westlife. It was released by Virgin EMI Records on 29 March 2019 as the second single from the band's eleventh studio album, Spectrum. It is their second single released under Universal Music Group and Virgin EMI Records. The song was written by Ed Sheeran, Fred Again, Steve Mac and Wayne Hector. As of 30 November 2021, this is their twentieth biggest single of all time in the United Kingdom.

This is their second number-one hit in the UK Singles Physical Chart and number-two in UK Singles Sales Chart and Scottish Singles Chart in 2019 and in 2010s decade. The single is their 29th Top 10 hit in Ireland and 28th Top 40, and 29th Top 75 hit in the United Kingdom.

== Background, development, and release ==
Since they announced their breakup in 2011 and their last appearance together in 2012, several rumors about them reuniting and making new musics have appeared. On 23 September 2018, several Irish news outlets started reporting that the group has been signed to Universal Music Group and Virgin EMI Records for a new music record deal. On 3 October 2018, the group announced that there would be new music coming soon.

This song is set in the key of B major, in a moderate 4/4 time signature. The vocal range of this piece ranges from F♯_{3} to B_{4} (Feehily's harmony).

== Music video ==
The music video was directed by Lochlainn "Locky" McKenna and was filmed in Dublin, Ireland in two locations. The band were shot in the historic Windmill Lane Studios. The music video depicts a teenage romance blossoming in 1993, and they become estranged after the boy ignores her after a school performance, but they soon get back together. That same girl is shown in the recording studio where the band is singing the song, all grown up. And she is married to that same boy, and they have a kid together.

== Tours performed at ==
- The Twenty Tour (2019)

== Formats and track listings ==
- Digital download
1. "Better Man" – 3:17
- Digital download
1. "Better Man" (orchestral) – 3:23
- CD single / streaming
1. "Better Man" – 3:17
2. "Better Man" (orchestral) – 3:23
- Digital download / streaming
1. "Better Man" (acoustic) – 3:13

== Credits and personnel ==
- Westlife (Kian Egan, Mark Feehily, Nicky Byrne, Shane Filan) – vocals, associated performer
- Ed Sheeran – songwriting
- Steve Mac – production, songwriting, keyboards, piano
- Fred Again – songwriting
- Wayne Hector – songwriting
- Chris Laws – drums, engineering, mixing
- Dann Pursey – engineering
- John Parricelli – guitar
- Dave Arch – strings, arranger
- Steve Pearce – bass
- Dick Beetham – mastering
- Duncan Fuller – engineering
- Mike Horner - engineering

== Charts ==
Chart (2019)	Peak position
China Airplay/FL (Billboard)	44
Denmark Digital Songs (Billboard)	10
Hungary (Single Top 40)	24
Ireland (IRMA)	8
New Zealand Digital Songs (Billboard)	9
New Zealand Hot Singles (RMNZ)	26
Scotland Singles (OCC)	2
Sweden Digital Songs (Billboard)	5
UK Singles (OCC)	26

== Certifications ==
Region	Certification	Certified units/sales
United Kingdom (BPI)	Silver	200,000^{‡}
^{‡} Sales+streaming figures based on certification alone.

== Release history ==
Region	Date	Format	Version	Label
Various	29 March 2019	Airplay, CD, digital download, streaming	Orchestral, original	Universal Music Group, Virgin EMI
Various	26 April 2019	Digital download, streaming	Acoustic	Universal Music Group, Virgin EMI
