= Fire (Markus Feehily album) =

Studio album by Markus Feehily
- Released: 16 October 2015
- Recorded: 2014–2015
- Genre: Pop
- Length: 43:23
- Label: Harmoney Entertainment
- Producer: Mojam, Jim Eliot, The Nexus, Jakwob, Steve Anderson, Lester Mendez, Matt Schwartz, Bert Elliott

Markus Feehily chronology
Fire (2015)	Christmas (2017)

Singles from Fire
- 1. "Love Is a Drug" Released: 19 April 2015; 2. "Butterfly" Released: 23 August 2015; 3. "Only You" Released: 29 September 2015; 4. "Sanctuary" Released: 5 February 2016

Professional ratings
Review scores
Source	Rating
Renowned for Sound	3.5/5 stars

Fire is the debut solo studio album by Westlife vocalist Markus Feehily. The album was released on October 16, 2015, via Harmoney Entertainment, as part of the Kobalt Music Group. The album includes the singles "Love is a Drug" and "Butterfly".

== Background ==
In February 2015, Feehily announced that he was launching his solo career with the release of his debut single, "Love Is a Drug", which received its radio premiere on RTÉ 2fm in Ireland later that week. The next day, the track premiered online, via Wonderland Magazine. Moments after the premiere of the song, it was made available for pre-order on iTunes, with the official video for the track launching on his Vevo channel two weeks later.

Feehily also announced a one-off show at Scala in London on March 4, 2015, where he played several tracks from the upcoming record, as well as updated versions of some former Westlife classics, including "What Makes a Man" and "Flying Without Wings". "Love is a Drug" was officially released on April 19, 2015, peaking at #56 on the UK Singles Chart. Feehily released an instant great track from the album, "Find My Way", on July 14, 2015.

Feehily said of the album; "Calling my album Fire is a two-sided thing. Fire represents the dark times I went through while writing the album, but also my actual song 'Fire' from the deluxe album is about finding new love and having the strength to pull through the tough times. So it has both positive and negative sides to it just like actual fire. I was also so pleased to work with some of the best songwriters and producers in the industry. They gave me the opportunity to write and record the type of music that I've always wanted to release. Working with them was both a pleasure and an honour." Feehily worked with a number of collaborators for the project, including Mojam, Jim Eliot, Jakwob and The Nexus.

== Track listing ==
Standard edition
No.	Title	Writer(s)	Producer(s)	Length
1.	"Love Is a Drug"	Markus Feehily; Tinashe Fazakerley; Steve Anderson	Mojam	3:39
2.	"Wash the Pain Away"	Feehily; Fazakerley; Anderson	Steve Anderson	3:53
3.	"Butterfly"	Feehily; Joni Mitchell; Mark Mehigan; Bert Elliot	Elliott	3:44
4.	"Cut You Out"	Feehily; Fazakerley; Anu Pilai	Pillai	4:22
5.	"Sanctuary"	Feehily; Gareth Daley; Anderson; Paul Brennan; Ciarán Brennan	Anderson	4:34
6.	"Back to Yours"	Feehily; David Sneddon; James Bauer-Mein	The Nexus	3:36
7.	"Sirens"	Feehily; Mehigan; James Edward Jacob	Jakwob; SeeB	3:24
8.	"Simple Love"	Feehily; Mehigan; Greg Bonnick; Leon Price; Conor O'Donoghue	Jim Eliot	4:30
9.	"Only You"	Feehily; Fazakerley; Anderson	Anderson	3:39
10.	"Love Me, Or Leave Me Alone"	Feehily; Benedict Cork; Anderson	Anderson	3:17
11.	"Casablanca"	Feehily; David Gibson; Martin Sjølie	Sjølie	5:04

Deluxe edition bonus tracks
No.	Title	Writer(s)	Producer(s)	Length
12.	"The Fall"	Feehily; Iain Farquarson; Sjølie	Sjølie	3:53
13.	"Find My Way"	Feehily; Lily Elise Housh; Lester Mendez	Mendez	2:53
14.	"Tempest Love"	Feehily; Emma Rohan; Matt Schwartz	Schwartz	3:56
15.	"Fire"	Feehily; Sneddon; Bauer-Mein	The Nexus	3:10

== Charts ==
Chart (2015)	Peak position
Irish Albums (IRMA)	2
Scottish Albums (OCC)	17
UK Albums (OCC)	25
UK Independent Albums (OCC)	3
