= The Rua =

Irish/British family pop-rock band

- Origin: Windsor, England
- Genres: Pop; rock; pop-rock; indie pop
- Years active: 2013–present
- Members: Roseanna Brown; Alanna Brown; Jonathan Brown

The Rua are an Irish/British family pop-rock band from Windsor, England. The band consists of sisters, Roseanna (Lead Vocals, guitar), Alanna (Piano, backing vocals) and brother, Jonathan Brown (violin, vocals, guitar).

Billboard named the band one of "Tomorrow's Hits", also calling the band's "sound" a mix between Taylor Swift, The Cranberries and The Corrs. Q gave their debut album Essence a four-star review.

In 2019 they were the main opening act for Westlife on the UK dates of The Twenty Tour.

== History ==
The Rua grew up in Windsor, Berkshire, however, their family roots are all from Ireland, where they spent a lot of their time growing up, playing music and taking part in music competitions. They are also the nieces and nephew of Irish Eurovision winner Dana Rosemary Scallon. They were all classically trained on piano, violin and voice and performed together from when they were all young. The trio formed as a band in 2011 and started writing their own material together. They were influenced by all types and genres of music, especially from growing up in such a musical family. Artists such as Fleetwood Mac, U2, Coldplay, Snow Patrol, The Corrs, Taylor Swift, Adele, have had a lot of musical impact on the group and their writing.

== Music ==
=== Essence ===
Nigel Harrison, former bass player of the rock band Blondie, played on the band's debut album. On drums they brought in Clive Deamer, who is best known for playing in Portishead, Get the Blessing, and Radiohead. On keys/synth was Mike Rowe, who plays with Noel Gallagher's High Flying Birds and on electric guitar was Dani Robinson, who played Jimi Hendrix in The Hendrix Experience, with original bassist Billy Cox.

The second single from the album, "Without You", was the fourth most added song in its first week at Hot AC radio, tied with Zara Larsson and MNEK's "Never Forget You".

On 20 May 2016 The Rua debuted "Without You" for the first time in Ireland, as guests performing on The Late Late Show in Dublin. Its dance remix by Love to Infinity secured the no. 3 Breakout spot on the Billboard Dance Club Songs chart and peaked at no. 17 on the Billboard Dance Club Songs.

They had three singles from this album, including "Fight for What's Right", "Without You" and "Fire & Lies", all of which charted at Hot AC radio.

=== The Rua ===
In 2019 the band announced they would be releasing a self-titled second album. The album has the same session musicians as Essence apart from a change of drummer to Manny Elis from band Tears for Fears. The Rua was released online on 25 September 2019. The eleven-track album also includes an acoustic cover of the Grammy Award-winning song "Clarity" by producer Zedd.

Three singles off this second album also placed at Hot AC radio - ‘All I Ever Wanted’ (no. 27), ‘Gasoline’ (number 25) and ‘Hey You’ (no. 36). ‘Gasoline’ also was the first single to break in to the top 30 in the Billboard Adult Top 40 chart reaching no. 25

=== Tour ===
In 2019 the band supported Westlife on their 30-date UK The Twenty Tour.

They have previously opened up for and shared the stage with Shinedown, Rob Thomas, Goo Goo Dolls, Train, Rachel Platten, Adam Lambert, Michael Franti & Spearhead, A Great Big World, Third Eye Blind, Wrabel, Parachute, Blue October, Walking on Cars and Andrew McMahon.

== Film ==
All three have appeared in the Harry Potter film series. Alanna was in Gryffindor and appeared in Harry Potter and the Goblet of Fire, Harry Potter and the Half-Blood Prince and Harry Potter and the Deathly Hallows. Roseanna in Slytherin appeared in Harry Potter and the Goblet of Fire, Harry Potter and the Half-Blood Prince and Harry Potter and the Deathly Hallows. Jonathan was in Hufflepuff and appeared in Harry Potter and the Deathly Hallows. Saying "it was one of the best experiences we have ever had... it was like being part of a big family". They have also been in films separately. Roseanna appeared in Thor: The Dark World, Maleficent and Snow White and the Huntsman; Alanna in The Crown and Allied; and Jonathan in Dark Shadows.

== Discography ==
=== Albums ===
- Essence (2015)
- The Rua (2019)

=== Singles ===
Title	Year	Peak chart positions		
Title	Year	US Adult	US Dance Club	US AC
"Without You"	2016	38	17	—
"Fire and Lies"	2017	30	—	—
"All I Ever Wanted"	2018	27	18	—
"Have Yourself a Very Merry Christmas"	2018	—	—	25
"Gasoline"	2019	25	—	—
"Hey You"	2019	36	—	—
