= Love Is a Drug (Markus Feehily song) =

Single by Markus Feehily

from the album Fire
- Released: 19 April 2015
- Recorded: 2014
- Genre: Pop, soul
- Length: 3:39
- Label: Harmoney Entertainment
- Songwriters: Markus Feehily; Steve Anderson; Tinashé Fazakerley
- Producers: Mojam, Steve Anderson

Markus Feehily singles chronology
"Love Is a Drug" (2015)	"Butterfly" (2015)

Professional ratings
Review scores
Source	Rating
Renowned for Sound	4/5 stars

"Love Is a Drug" is a song by Irish singer Markus Feehily. It was released in the United Kingdom as a digital download on 19 April 2015 through Harmoney Entertainment. It was released as the lead single from his debut studio album Fire (2015). The song was written by Feehily, Steve Anderson and Tinashé Fazakerley, and produced by Mojam. It peaked at number 65 on the Irish Singles Chart and number 56 on the UK Singles Chart.

== Background ==
After Westlife split up in June 2012, Feehily launched his solo career. In February 2015, he debuted his debut single on RTÉ 2fm in Ireland. The next day, the track premiered online via Wonderland Magazine. Moments after the premiere of the song, it was made available for pre-order on iTunes. In an interview with Digital Spy talking about the song, Feehily said: "If I ever went to write a Westlife song, you be like, 'Oh let's do this kind of beat' or whatever, and it would just never be a Westlife song if it had that beat. [...] When Westlife finished, the rule book was thrown out of the window in terms of songwriting. I took away all the formulas and just went hell for leather at it. 'Love Is A Drug' is one of the examples of what came out when I did that." It was written by Steve Anderson, Feehliy and Tinashe Fazerkely; produced by MoJam and Steve Anderson; mixed by Jeremy Wheatley; and strings/choirs arranged by Cliff Masterson.

Sky Sports used the instrumental of the song as their theme for their Ashes Cricket coverage in 2023.

== Music video ==
A music video to accompany the release of "Love Is a Drug" was first released onto YouTube on 4 March 2015 at a total length of 3:39. The video was directed by Naroop Jhooti.

== Track listing ==
Digital download - Single
No.	Title	Length
1.	"Love Is a Drug"	3:39

Digital download - Remixes
No.	Title	Length
1.	"Love Is a Drug"	3:39
2.	"Love Is a Drug" (The Longside Remix)	3:13
3.	"Love Is a Drug" (Secaina Hudson Remix)	4:05
4.	"Love Is a Drug" (88 Ninety's 'Love Addiction' 12" Remix)	5:33

== Charts ==
Chart (2014)	Peak position
Ireland (IRMA)	65
Scotland Singles (OCC)	27
UK Singles (OCC)	56
UK Indie (OCC)	4

== Release history ==
Region	Date	Format	Label
Ireland	19 April 2015	Digital download	Harmoney Entertainment
United Kingdom	19 April 2015	Digital download	Harmoney Entertainment
