= Roseanna Brown =

British-Irish Singer & actor (born 1991 or 1992

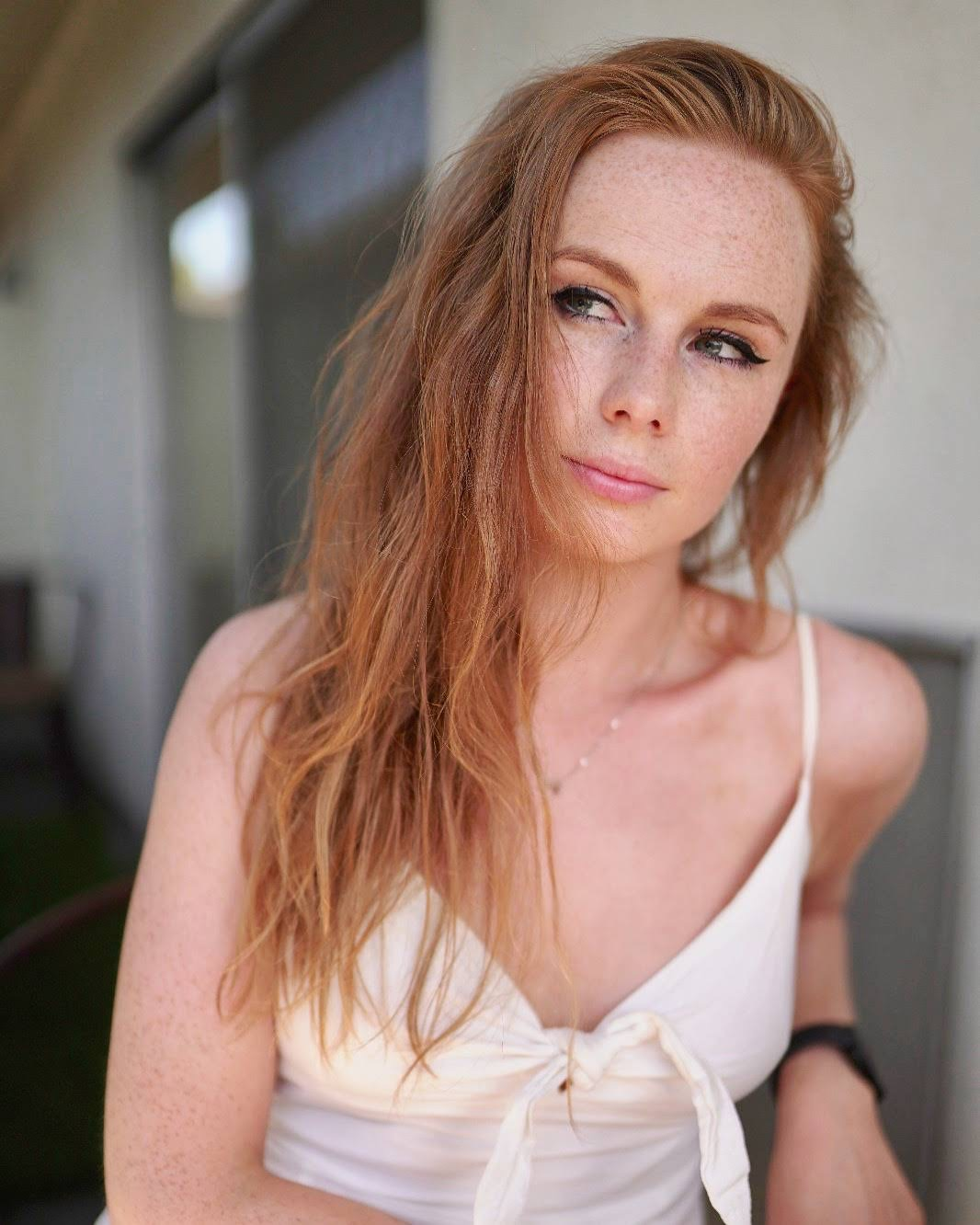
- Roseanna in 2019
- Born: Roseanna Brown; 1991 or 1992 (age 34–35); Hillingdon, London, England
- Occupations: Actress; singer; songwriter
- Years active: 2007–present
- Musical career
- Origin: Windsor, Berkshire, England
- Genres: Contemporary; pop
- Instruments: Vocals; Piano; Guitar
- Label: FOD Records

Roseanna Brown (born 1991 or 1992), also known mononymously Roseanna, is a British-Irish singer-songwriter and actress. She is the lead singer of the pop group The Rua, with whom she achieved Top 40 singles on the Billboard Adult Pop Airplay chart, was featured in Billboard's "Tomorrow’s Hits" and toured internationally, including an arena tour with Westlife. In 2025, she began releasing music as a solo artist. As an actor, she has appeared in film and television, beginning her career in the Harry Potter film series.

== Early life ==
Brown was born in Hillingdon, London, into a musical Irish family; her aunt is Ireland's first Eurovision winner, Dana. She was raised in Windsor, Berkshire, and attended St Bernard's Catholic Grammar School in Slough. She trained at stage schools including Redroofs Theatre School and performed with the Royal Borough Youth Opera and Taplow Youth Choir. In 2008, the choir was awarded the title of BBC Radio 3 "Youth Choir of the Year", with Brown performing as a soloist. She studied Classical Music & Drama at Royal Holloway

== Career ==
=== Music ===
==== The Rua ====
Brown is the lead singer of the family pop group The Rua, formed in 2013. The group has released two studio albums, Essence (2016) and The Rua (2019), working with musicians including Nigel Harrison of Blondie, Clive Deamer of Portishead and Radiohead, and Manny Elias of Tears for Fears. Their single "Without You" was among the most added songs at Hot AC radio in its first week. Its remix by Love to Infinity peaked at number 17 on the Billboard Dance Club Songs chart. The group achieved multiple charting singles on the Billboard Adult Pop Airplay chart, including "All I Ever Wanted" "Gasoline", and "Hey You", with "Gasoline" reaching the Top 30. The Rua toured internationally, including a 30-date UK arena tour supporting Westlife, and performed with artists including Train, Goo Goo Dolls, Shinedown, Rob Thomas, and Haim. Their debut album, Essence, received a four-star review from Q magazine.

==== Solo Career ====
Brown began her solo career, under her first name, in 2025 with the release of the single "Best Time to Call You". She subsequently released multiple singles, which have received support from BBC Introducing.

=== Acting ===
Brown began her on-screen acting career with appearances in the Harry Potter film series. She went on to appear in major studio productions including Thor: The Dark World. In the 2026 film Pressure, directed by Anthony Maras she plays Eisenhower’s Operator for D-Day operations, alongside Andrew Scott, Damien Lewis and Brendan Fraser.

== Discography ==
=== Roseanna ===
- "Best Time to Call You" (2025)
- "LoveHate" (2025)
- "Rain" (2026)
- "Help Me" (2026)
- "Awake" (2026)
- "Yes" (2026)

=== The Rua ===
- Essence (2016)
- The Rua (2019)

=== Singles ===
Title	Year	Peak chart positions		
Title	Year	US Adult	US Dance Club	US AC
"Without You"	2016	38	17	—
"Fire and Lies"	2017	30	—	—
"All I Ever Wanted"	2018	27	18	—
"Have Yourself a Very Merry Christmas"	2018	—	—	25
"Gasoline"	2019	25	—	—
"Hey You"	2019	36	—	—

== Filmography ==
=== Film ===
Year	Title	Role
2005	Harry Potter and the Goblet of Fire (film)	Slytherin Student
2011	Harry Potter and the Deathly Hallows – Part 2	Slytherin Student
2013	Thor: The Dark World	Wench #2
2020	Songbird	End Title Singer & Songwriter ("Kingdom")
2026	Pressure	Lead Operator

=== Television ===
Year	Title	Role
2022	House of the Dragon	Highborn Noblewoman
2023	Citadel	Stand-in for Ashleigh Cummings
