= Queen of My Heart =

2001 single by Westlife

Single by Westlife

from the album World of Our Own
- A-side: "When You're Looking Like That"
- B-side: "Reason for Living"
- Released: 5 November 2001
- Studio: Olympic (London)
- Length: 4:23
- Label: RCA; BMG
- Songwriters: John McLaughlin; Wayne Hector; Steve Mac; Steve Robson
- Producer: Steve Mac

Westlife UK/Ireland singles chronology
"Uptown Girl" (2001)	"Queen of My Heart" / "When You're Looking Like That" (2001)	"World of Our Own" (2002)

Westlife international singles chronology
"When You're Looking Like That" (2001)	"Queen of My Heart" (2001)	"World of Our Own" (2002)

Music video
- "Queen of My Heart" on YouTube

Alternative cover
- UK CD2 artwork

"Queen of My Heart" is a song by Irish boy band Westlife. It was released on 5 November 2001 as the first single from their third studio album, World of Our Own (2001). It was released as a double A-side single with "When You're Looking Like That" in the United Kingdom and Ireland.

The song debuted at number one on the UK Singles Chart, giving the band their ninth UK number-one single in two and a half years. It became the 23rd-best-selling single of 2001 in the UK and received a gold sales certification in the UK for over 400,000 copies sold. It is the band's eighth-best-selling single in paid-for sales and ninth-best-selling single in combined sales in the UK as of January 2019.

== Background ==
The song was written by John McLaughlin, Wayne Hector, Steve Robson and Steve Mac and was produced by Mac. It was composed in the traditional verse–chorus form in B major, with Brian McFadden's, Shane Filan's, and Mark Feehily's vocals ranging from the chords of B_{3} to B♭_{5}. In an interview, Kian Egan said that the song was about a person who wants to go back to their soulmate whom they have been away from for a long time.

During live performances, the song is sometimes introduced with a military-style drumbeat and features more prominent arrangements, including bagpipes, a choir, accordion, flute, and strings, lending it a richer, more cinematic texture. Following McFadden’s departure, Egan and Nicky Byrne assumed his vocal parts in subsequent renditions, maintaining the song’s signature harmonies.

== Music video ==
The music video for "Queen of My Heart" was directed by Max & Dania. It features the members of Westlife in a castle with Filan and Egan in one room, Feehily and Byrne in another room, and McFadden sitting on the stairs alone. During the video, Byrne shaves his hair, giving himself a buzz cut. Towards the end of the video, many fans appear and surround the band members. There are two alternate starts of the video: a first view of the castle, and another with rain and a lightning strike of the place.

== Track listings ==
- UK CD1
1. "Queen of My Heart" (radio edit)
2. "When You're Looking Like That" (single remix)
3. "Reason for Living"
4. "When You're Looking Like That" (CD ROM video)
- UK CD2
1. "Queen of My Heart" (radio edit)
2. "When You're Looking Like That" (single remix)
3. "Interview" (CD ROM)
- UK cassette single
1. "Queen of My Heart" (radio edit)
2. "When You're Looking Like That" (single remix)
- European CD single
1. "Queen of My Heart" (radio edit)
2. "Reason for Living"

== Credits and personnel ==
Credits are lifted from the UK CD1 liner notes.

Recording

- Recorded at Olympic Studios (London)

Personnel

- Steve Mac – writing, production, arrangement, mixing, piano, keyboards
- John McLaughlin – writing
- Steve Robson – writing
- Wayne Hector – writing, additional backing vocals
- Chris Laws – Pro Tools engineering, engineering, drums
- Matt Howe – recording, mixing engineer
- Daniel Pursey – assistant engineering
- Quentin Guine – assistant engineering
- Lee McCutcheon – Pro Tools engineering
- Steve Pearce – bass
- Frizzy Karlsson – guitars
- Paul Gendler – guitars
- Mae McKenna – additional backing vocals
- Eddie Hession – accordion
- Bob White – bagpipes
- Gavin Wright – strings
- Alice Holsgrove – choir
- Christopher Baptiste – choir
- Daniel Udy – choir
- Hannah Baptiste – choir
- Henry Verbi – choir
- Laura Taylor – choir
- Lee Raymond – choir
- Louise Raymond – choir
- Mathew Taylor – choir
- Rachael Holsgrove – choir
- Rebekah Holsgrove – choir
- Samuel Udy – choir
- Samuel Verbi – choir
- Victoria Verbi – choir
- Kim Chandler – conducting
- Dave Arch – orchestral arrangement
- Dick Beetham – mastering

== Charts ==
=== Weekly charts ===
Chart (2001–2002)	Peak position
Austria (Ö3 Austria Top 40)	33
Belgium (Ultratop 50 Flanders)	14
Denmark (Tracklisten)	15
Europe (Eurochart Hot 100)	8
Europe (European Hit Radio)	17
Germany (GfK)	27
Guatemala (Notimex)	2
Ireland (IRMA) with "When You're Looking Like That"	1
Italy (FIMI)	28
Italy (Musica e dischi)	24
Netherlands (Dutch Top 40)	18
Netherlands (Single Top 100)	12
Netherlands Airplay (Music & Media)	20
New Zealand (Recorded Music NZ)	4
Nicaragua (Notimex)	5
Norway (VG-lista)	12
Romania (Romanian Top 100)	24
Scottish Singles Sales (Official Charts) with "When You're Looking Like That"	1
Spain Airplay (Top 40 Radio)	28
Sweden (Sverigetopplistan)	3
Switzerland (Schweizer Hitparade)	37
UK Singles (Official Charts) with "When You're Looking Like That"	1
UK Airplay (Music Week)	17

=== Year-end charts ===
Chart (2001)	Position
Ireland (IRMA)	14
Sweden (Hitlistan)	51
UK Singles (OCC)	23

Chart (2002)	Position
Sweden (Hitlistan)	94
Taiwan (Hito Radio)	43

== Certifications and sales ==
Region	Certification	Certified units/sales
New Zealand (RMNZ)	Gold	15,000^{‡}
Sweden (GLF)	Gold	15,000^{^}
United Kingdom (BPI)	Platinum	600,000^{‡}
^{^} Shipments figures based on certification alone.^{‡} Sales+streaming figures based on certification alone.
