= Hello My Love =

2019 single by Westlife

Single by Westlife

from the album Spectrum
- Released: 10 January 2019
- Length: 3:34
- Label: Universal; Virgin EMI
- Songwriters: Ed Sheeran; Steve Mac
- Producers: Steve Mac (single mix, instrumental, and John Gibbons remix); Red Triangle (acoustic); John Gibbons (remix, extended mix, and instrumentals); Colin Hanley (remixes)

Westlife singles chronology
"Lighthouse" (2011)	"Hello My Love" (2019)	"Better Man" (2019)

Music video
- "Hello My Love" on YouTube

"Hello My Love" is a song by Irish pop vocal band Westlife. It was released on 10 January 2019 as the lead single from the band's eleventh studio album, Spectrum, and is their first single to be released under Universal Music Group and Virgin EMI Records. It is also their first official single in eight years since the release of their last single, "Lighthouse", in 2011. The song was written by Ed Sheeran and Steve Mac. As of 30 November 2021, this is their eighth biggest single of all time in the United Kingdom with 54.5 million streams in the country alone as of 30 November 2021.

It reached number two in Ireland and Scotland, it is their highest charting on their official singles charts since the band's "What About Now" single in 2009, ten years before. Also their first chart-topper in 2019 and the 2010s decade. The single stayed at number one for two weeks on the UK Physical Chart, the group's highest charting since their 2005 and 2006 singles, "You Raise Me Up" and "The Rose". The single was certified Platinum in 2024 by the British Phonographic Industry and 2× Platinum by the Irish Recorded Music Association.

== Background ==
On 23 September 2018, it was reported that the group was signed to Universal Music Group and Virgin EMI Records for a new music record deal. On 3 October 2018, the group formally announced on their official social media accounts that there would be new music coming soon.

On 19 November 2018, band manager Louis Walsh confirmed the title on The Irish News, calling it their first comeback single and an introduction to their new sound. On 7 January 2019, they officially announced the release date of the single would be on 10 January 2019. On 8 January 2019, they revealed the official photo cover of the single.

An acoustic version was released on 25 January 2019 and a remix version was released on 8 February 2019. The track was included in the Now That's What I Call Music! 102 compilation album on 12 April 2019.

== Composition ==
"Hello My Love" is a pop-EDM song that runs for 3 minutes and 34 seconds. The acoustic version runs for 4 minutes and 14 seconds. The John Gibbons remix runs for 3 minutes and 31 seconds. It was specifically written by Mac and Sheeran for Westlife. The demo version of the song was by Sheeran. Jonathan Vaughtrey of Wiwibloggs described the lyrics, "They are singing to their partner and thanking her. Even though there are 'plenty of fish in the sea', they're grateful that they were able to meet and she chose to spend her life with them." "Hello My Love" is composed in the key of F major and set in common time at a moderate tempo of 122 beats per minute. Westlife's voices range from C_{4} to a high C_{6}.

== Critical reception ==
Before the release of the single, Rob Copsey of the Official Charts Company said, "The group's first new track in eight years, called Hello My Love, is upbeat – for a Westlife single. We clock its bpm at around 128bpm, placing it between Uptown Girl and the criminally underappreciated Bop Bop Baby on the uptempo scale of their singles catalogue. If we had to compare it to anything on the Top 40 of late, it'd be in realm of Jess Glynne's All I Am meets Ed Sheeran's Castle on the Hill." Aoife Hanna of Bustle expressed the song is filled with self-deprecating humour. Thomas Cedergren of Rockfarbror.se awarded the song 4/5. Musicserver.cz awarded the song 7/10.

Wiwibloggs described the song, "The song's warm and uplifting spirit will no doubt get fans, both new and old, singing along." Peter Robinson of Popjustice noted, "It's better than you'd expect a Westlife song to be at this stage, but not quite as good as you'd expect an Ed Sheeran song to be". Alicia Adejobi of the Metro said it's a "radio-friendly track that boasts all of Ed's trademarks – a catchy beat and memorable lyrics." Their former bandmate Brian McFadden tweeted on 10 January 2019 that it was "a great song and great production."

== Commercial performance ==
"Hello My Love" premiered on 10 January 2019. It reached number-one on the Amazon UK also in iTunes Store Top Songs. It also charted at iTunes Pop Top Songs of Japan and the United States. It sold over five thousand combined sales according to Music Week in the UK. On its debut week, it charted at number three on the Scottish Singles Chart, UK Singles Downloads Chart, and UK Singles Sales Chart, and number sixty-seven on the Irish Singles Chart. On its second week, it premiered at number-seven in the UK Singles Chart Update, it peaked at the number-one spot on Ireland Digital Song Sales, it rose to number-two on Irish Singles Chart, Scottish Singles Chart, and UK Singles Sales Chart.

== Promotion ==
In 2019, the group began promotion of the song on 7 January with a nine-second video clip. The clip was viewed over 250,000 times in the first 24 hours across Twitter and Instagram. Their first tour together outside UK and Ireland in seven years was on Singapore on 29 January 2019 to 1 February 2019 to promote "Hello My Love". A phone competition was also made where the fans can leave their voicemail that starts with "Hello My Love" then their follow-up message to a given hotline.

Several radio interviews of Westlife were aired on 10 January 2019 after the premiere of the single, before 0900 GMT on FM104, 1000 GMT on Magic FM, 1100 GMT on Cool FM, More Radio Mid-Sussex and 1600 GMT on Wave FM.

Their first UK recorded television appearance and performance together in six years was on The Graham Norton Show on 11 January 2019 where they performed the new single as well. They also performed the single on the 24th National Television Awards on 22 January 2019. They also pre-recorded a live performance of the single in All Round to Mrs. Brown's in February 2019 and had its live telecast on 20 April 2019.

They also promoted the single with a live performance in a German television awards in Goldene Kamera on 30 March 2019 in Berlin, their first promotion in mainland Europe since 2009.

== Music video ==
On 11 January 2019, Good Morning Britain introduced the world exclusive short clip of the video. The official music video premiered on the group's official YouTube and Vevo account on the same day.

It was shot in Joshua Tree, California. Wiwibloggs described the video, "Such a setting could have easily made the clip quite ‘beige’ overall. However, they add in a bit of colour by blowing up a hot air balloon that has a multi-coloured-stripped pattern to it and jamming out inside." Carl Kinsella of joe.ie added, "Today, the lads have followed it up with a music video to rival the Westlife classics of old. Much like the videos for "Obvious" and "My Love", this one sees them wandering around a pretty landscape without anyone else in sight. The video ends with the lads performing inside the balloon part of a hot air balloon before it takes off — hopefully not with them inside."

== Accolades ==
=== RTÉ Choice Music Prize ===
Year	Nominee/work	Award	Result
2019	Song of the Year	Hello My Love	Won

== Tours performed at ==
- The Twenty Tour (2019)
- Wild Dreams Tour (2022)

== Formats and track listings ==
- Digital download / streaming
1. "Hello My Love" – 3:34
- CD single
1. "Hello My Love" – 3:34
2. "Hello My Love" (instrumental) – 3:34
- Digital download
1. "Hello My Love" (acoustic) – 4:14
- Streaming
1. "Hello My Love" (acoustic) – 4:14
2. "Hello My Love" – 3:34
- Digital download
1. "Hello My Love" (John Gibbons remix) – 3:31
- Streaming (Deezer)
1. "Hello My Love" (John Gibbons remix) – 3:31
- Streaming (Spotify)
1. "Hello My Love" (John Gibbons remix) – 3:31
2. "Hello My Love" – 3:34
3. "Hello My Love" (acoustic) – 4:14

== Credits and personnel ==
Credits adapted from Tidal.

=== Single Mix ===
- Westlife (Kian Egan, Mark Feehily, Nicky Byrne, Shane Filan) – vocals, associated performer
- Ed Sheeran – songwriting
- Steve Mac – production, songwriting, keyboards, piano
- Chris Laws – drums, engineering, programming
- Dann Pursey – engineering, programming
- John Parricelli – guitar
- John Hanes – mixing engineer
- Serban Ghenea – mixing
- Randy Merrill – mastering
- Bill Zimmerman – engineering
- Jordan Jay - A&R

=== Acoustic ===
- Westlife (Kian Egan, Mark Feehily, Nicky Byrne, Shane Filan) – vocals, associated performer
- Ed Sheeran – composer, lyricist
- Steve Mac – composer, lyricist
- Rick Parkhouse – acoustic guitar, associated performer, programming
- George Tizzard – acoustic guitar, associated performer, programming
- Alex Gordon – mastering engineer, studio personnel
- Red Triangle – mixer, producer

=== Remix ===
- Westlife (Kian Egan, Mark Feehily, Nicky Byrne, Shane Filan) – vocals, main artists, associated performer
- Steve Mac – production, songwriting, keyboards, piano, composer, lyricist
- John Gibbons – producer, re-mixer, mixing
- Colin Hanley – producer
- Ed Sheeran – songwriting, composer, lyricist
- Chris Laws – associated performer, drums, engineering, programming, studio personnel
- Dann Pursey – engineering, programming, studio personnel
- John Parricelli – guitar, associated performer
- John Hanes – mixing engineer, studio personnel
- Serban Ghenea – mixing, studio personnel
- Wez Clarke – mixing
- Kevin Grainger – mastering engineer, studio personnel

== Charts ==
=== Weekly charts ===
Chart (2019)	Peak position
Belgium (Ultratip Bubbling Under Flanders)	27
China Airplay/FL (Billboard)	11
Croatia Airplay (HRT)	45
Denmark Digital Songs (Billboard)	6
Euro Digital Songs (Billboard)	6
Ireland (IRMA)	2
Netherlands (Dutch Top 40 Tipparade)	19
New Zealand Hot Singles (RMNZ)	18
Scotland Singles (OCC)	2
South Korea (Gaon Weekly BGM Chart)	1
Sweden Digital Songs (Billboard)	7
Sweden Heatseeker (Sverigetopplistan)	10
Switzerland Airplay (Swiss Hitparade)	91
UK Singles (OCC)	13

=== Year-end charts ===
Chart (2019)	Position
Ireland (IRMA)	45

== Certifications and sales ==
Region	Certification	Certified units/sales
United Kingdom (BPI)	Platinum	600,000^{‡}
^{‡} Sales+streaming figures based on certification alone.

== Release history ==
Region	Date	Format	Version	Label
Various	10 January 2019	Radio airplay, digital download, audio streaming	Single Mix	Universal Music Group, Virgin EMI
Various	11 January 2019	CD, video streaming	Single Mix	Universal Music Group, Virgin EMI
Various	11 January 2019	CD	Instrumental	Universal Music Group, Virgin EMI
Various	25 January 2019	Digital download, streaming	Acoustic	Universal Music Group, Virgin EMI
Various	8 February 2019	Digital download, streaming	John Gibbons remix, extended remix, and instrumentals	Universal Music Group, Virgin EMI
