= John Gibbons (DJ) =

Irish DJ & producer

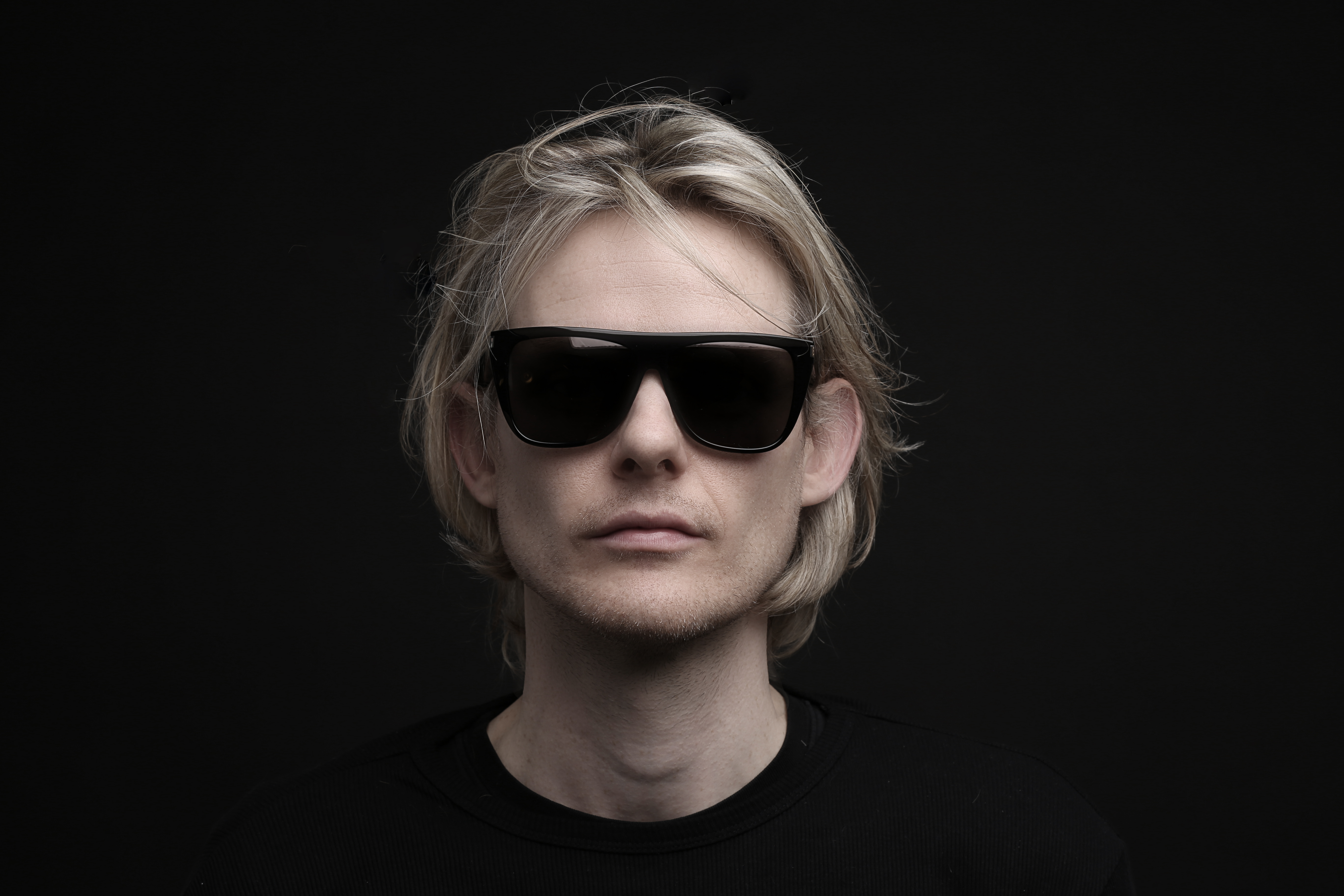

Background information
- Born: Dublin, Ireland
- Origin: Carlow, Ireland
- Genres: House; dance-pop; electronic; tropical house; deep house
- Occupations: DJ; record producer
- Years active: 2005–present
- Labels: Good Soldier, Blindsided, Spinnin', Sony, Warner, Universal, Ultra
- Website: http://www.djjohngibbons.com

John Gibbons is an Irish DJ and record producer based in London. He is best known for his singles, "Would I Lie to You" and the follow-up, "P.Y.T. (Pretty Young Thing)".

== Career ==
Gibbons first charted in 2008 with his track "Beautiful Filth", a collaboration with fellow Irishman DJ Scimon Tist which crossed over from underground clubs to peak at No. 22 on the Irish Singles Chart and No. 1 on the Irish Dance Chart. Gibbons then spent several years working on studio productions, after which followed the 2013 release of collaborative singles "All I Need", and "Colder." In 2015, Gibbons signed a publishing deal with the London-based Good Soldier Songs and that year released his first solo single, "Your Love". The single received significant radio airplay in both the UK and Ireland and was featured on the US TV drama Pretty Little Liars.

The 2016 follow-up, "Would I Lie to You?" was mixed and mastered by Nick Bennett and Wez Clarke. It reached number 34 in his native Ireland and 53 in the UK, achieving Certified Silver status in the UK and Platinum in Ireland.

Gibbons' single, "P.Y.T. (Pretty Young Thing)", released in April 2017, charted at No. 48 in the UK (spending 12 weeks on the UK Singles Chart and gaining Certified Gold status, No. 21 in Ireland and 3× Platinum, as well as No. 12 on the UK Dance Singles Chart, No. 1 on the UK Indie Singles Chart and No. 22 on the Scottish Singles Chart.

Gibbons' single "Sunglasses in the Rain", featuring vocals from UK singer Ai, was released on 20 October 2017.

Gibbons has also remixed the 2017 singles "Unpredictable" by Olly Murs and Louisa Johnson on Sony/RCA, "Hair Down" by Mollie King on Island/Universal, "Sucker for You" by Matt Terry on Sony/RCA, and Anne-Marie's single "Heavy" on Asylum/Warner, the latter achieving platinum status in Ireland. On 26 December 2017, it was announced that Gibbons was ranked at No. 2 and No. 16 on the most streamed Irish songs of the Year list with "P.Y.T. (Pretty Young Thing)" and "Would I Lie to You?" respectively, and was among the top 10 most streamed Irish artists of the year on Spotify.

The first release of 2018 for John Gibbons was an official remix of Gavin James' single "Hearts on Fire". Released on 5 January on Warner Music, the track constitutes part of the Hearts on Fire EP and is the only official remix of the track.

The original single "My Reflection" was released on 19 January by Warner Music. Written in LA with American singer-songwriter Mike City (Rihanna, Sunshine Anderson, Chris Brown, Brandy & Monica), the track takes a more down-tempo approach than Gibbons' previous singles. On the same day, Gibbons' remix of "You Are the Reason" by UK singer Calum Scott was released on Capitol Records.

On 10 February 2018, "Don't Say", a collaboration between Gibbons and US artist Kess Ross, featuring UK duo Phats & Small, was released on Warner Music's Dutch sub-label Spinnin' Records.

On 6 April 2018, Gibbons released a pop-dance version of Australian singer-songwriter Delta Goodrem's single "Think About You" on Sony Music. His remix of US songwriter Jared Dylan's single "Don't Stop" was released on 18 May 2018.

Gibbons released a cover of 1992 Inner Circle hit "Sweat (A La La La La Long)" on 1 June 2018. Premiered on the electronic blog site "Discobelle", the track was described as "irresistible to dance to and a track that's bound to make the summer festivals explode", with Gibbons quoted as saying, "I'm extremely excited for this release. Every good summer needs a hot, sweaty soundtrack and with this single I've set out to encapsulate that feel-good vibe, which I believe will have people everywhere jumping, dancing and singing along."

29 June 2018 saw the release of the up-tempo John Gibbons remix of Bastille's track "Quarter Past Midnight" on Virgin EMI, which was premiered on lead singer Dan Smith's Twitter account.

On 29 November 2018 Gibbons released a new single, "A Spaceman Came Travelling", a cover of the Chris de Burgh track originally released in 1976. Featuring the vocals of Scottish singer-songwriter Nina Nesbitt, the track premiered on Gibbons' own social media channels and is released on Blindsided/Good Soldier Records. Following extensive radio support across the UK and Ireland including 'Record of the Week' on BBC Radio 2, and chart positions in Ireland and Scotland, the track was performed live on TV for the first time by Gibbons and Nesbitt on RTÉ 1's Late Late Show on 21 December 2019, with the performance featuring a guest appearance from Chris de Burgh. The track also achieved Certified Gold status in Ireland.

Gibbons' first release of 2019 came on 25 January on Spinnin' Records, a collaboration with Northern Irish producer Junior J and Swedish singer Therese, entitled "Save a Little Love". The single peaked at No.40 on Germany's Dance 50 chart, gaining Gibbons his first German chart placing.

On 8 February 2019, the John Gibbons remix of Westlife's single "Hello My Love" was released on Virgin EMI/Universal. The release saw an immediate spike in sales, resulting in the single re-entering the UK Top 20.

12 April 2019 saw the release of the John Gibbons remix of "If You Wanna Be Loved" by Picture This on Republic/Universal, the band announcing the team-up with their fellow Irishman on their Twitter account. This release has to date achieved 2× Platinum status in Ireland.

Gibbons' third remix of 2019, a down-tempo version of "Moving Mountains" by Disco Fries featuring Ollie Green, was released on 8 May 2019 on Enhanced Music.

On 7 June 2019 Gibbons released a new single, "Hotstepper", a cover of the 1994 Ini Kamoze hit, "Here Comes the Hotstepper", with the news being announced on dance blog The Music Essentials and debuting on radio in the UK on 14 June 2019 on BBC Radio 1 with Scott Mills. Hotstepper charted in Ireland, resulting in Certified Platinum status.

Warner Music Spain announced the release of the John Gibbons remix of "Deep Cut" by Australian band Monarchy on 5 July 2019, marking Gibbons' fourth remix of 2019 and sixth release of the year in total.

2020 saw more chart success for Gibbons in Ireland with 'Let Me Love You', a collaboration with UK artist Franklin, which went Certified Platinum.

In December 2020, Gibbons launched his record label BLINDsided, with the first release, 'Me & U', a collaboration with Irish DJ Marty Guilfoyle, bringing the label instant success in Ireland and achieving Certified Gold status.

In 2023 it was announced that Gibbons had signed a major label artist deal with Sony and on June 16 he released the single 'All I Need', featuring US vocalist Treetalk.

== Discography ==
=== Singles ===
Title	Year	Peak chart positions					Certifications
Title	Year	IRE	AUS	GER Dance	SCO	UK	Certifications
"Beautiful Filth" (with Scimon Tist)	2008	22	—	—	—	—	
"Colder" (with Scimon Tist, featuring Skilf)	2013	62	—	—	—	—	
"Your Love"	2015	59	—	—	—	—	
"Would I Lie to You"	2016	34	—	—	46	53	IRMA: Platinum; BPI: Silver
"P.Y.T. (Pretty Young Thing)"	2017	21	55	—	22	48	IRMA: Platinum x3; BPI: Gold; ARIA: Platinum
"Sunglasses in the Rain" (featuring Ai)	2017	—	—	—	—	—	IRMA: Gold
"My Reflection" (featuring Mike City)	2018	—	—	—	—	—	
"Don't Say" (x Kess Ross, featuring Phats & Small)	2018	—	—	—	—	—	
"Sweat (A La La La La Long)"	2018	51	—	—	—	—	
"A Spaceman Came Travelling" (featuring Nina Nesbitt)	2018	58	—	—	12	—	IRMA: Gold
"Save a Little Love" (with Junior J, featuring Therese)	2019	—	—	40	—	—	
"Hotstepper"	2019	67	—	—	—	—	IRMA: Platinum
"2020" (with Uppbeat)	2020	—	—	—	—	—	
"Let Me Love You" (with Franklin)	2020	—	—	—	—	—	IRMA: Platinum
"Me & U" (with Marty Guilfoyle)	2020	—	—	—	—	—	IRMA: Gold
"Why Are We Waiting?" (with Stephanie Rainey)	2021	—	—	—	—	—	
"Real" (with Bright Sparks)	2021	—	—	—	—	—	
"Edge of Seventeen" (with LYRA)	2022	—	—	—	—	—	
"All I Need" (with Treetalk)	2023	—	—	—	—	—	
"—" denotes a single that did not chart or was not released in that territory.

=== Remixes ===
Title	Year	Original artist(s)	Certifications
"Unpredictable"	2017	Olly Murs and Louisa Johnson	
"Hair Down"	2017	Mollie King	
"Heavy"	2017	Anne-Marie	IRMA: Platinum
"Sucker for You"	2017	Matt Terry	
"Hearts on Fire"	2018	Gavin James	
"You Are the Reason"	2018	Calum Scott	
"Think About You"	2018	Delta Goodrem	
"Can't Stop"	2018	Jared Dylan	
"Quarter Past Midnight"	2018	Bastille	
"Hello My Love"	2019	Westlife	
"If You Wanna Be Loved"	2019	Picture This	IRMA: 2× Platinum
"Moving Mountains"	2019	Disco Fries ft. Ollie Green	
"Deep Cut"	2019	Monarchy	
"Rely"	2020	Karen Harding, Future Kings & L'Tric	
