= World of Our Own (song) =

2002 single by Westlife

Single by Westlife

from the album World of Our Own
- Released: 18 February 2002
- Studio: Rokstone (London, UK)
- Genre: Pop
- Length: 3:30
- Label: RCA; BMG; S
- Songwriters: Steve Mac; Wayne Hector; Dennis Morgan; Simon Climie
- Producer: Steve Mac

Westlife singles chronology
"Queen of My Heart" (2001)	"World of Our Own" (2002)	"Bop Bop Baby" (2002)

Music videos
- "World of Our Own" on YouTube; "World of Our Own" (US version) on YouTube

"World of Our Own CD2"

"World of Our Own" is a song by Irish boy band Westlife. It was released on 18 February 2002 as the second single from their third studio album of the same name (2001). The song peaked at number one on the UK Singles Chart, becoming their 10th number-one single. "World of Our Own" was the 40th-best-selling single of 2002 in the UK and received a platinum sales certification from the British Phonographic Industry (BPI) for over 600,000 sales and streams. It is the band's fourth-most-streamed song and 12th-best-selling single in both paid-for and combined sales in the United Kingdom as of January 2019.

== Critical reception ==
Chuck Taylor from Billboard called it "a definitive pop song", praising its "joyfully catchy chorus, itchy train-track-clacking beat, velvet harmonies" and Shane Filan's "glossy, emotive vocals", concluding that "Westlife deserves its shot in America, and this is the perfect song with which to take aim."

== Music video ==
The video of this song was directed by Cameron Casey and it was Rat Pack styled. The band members are dressed up as gangsters and they enter in an American Hummer. Until the first chorus, the band members sing beneath a bridge. Then, they go to the balcony of a futuristic building then on a deserted bridge. As they sing, the darkness lifts and the sun shines making everybody (the people) happy. The song ends with the scene shifting from the top of the roof of yet another futuristic building to back under the bridge from where the song initiated.

There is a video for the US version as well, which is more mature than the band's earlier videos. This video, directed by Antti Jokinen, features the band singing in an abandoned building with broken walls and surrounded by shrubbery. The video occasionally cuts to various couples kissing and necking each other while the band continue to sing in the building equipped with mics and seating on sofas. The video also shows the boys having fun at a party lit by candles, drinking beer and flirting with girls. The video ends in the same fashion it begins: by zooming out of the building.

Another video features the group members recording the song in a studio.

== Track listings ==
UK and Irish CD single

1. "World of Our Own" (single remix) – 3:28
2. "Crying Girl" – 3:39
3. "Angel" (remix) – 4:22
4. "World of Our Own" (CD ROM video)

European CD single

1. "World of Our Own" (single remix) – 3:29
2. "Crying Girl" – 3:39

European limited-edition CD single

1. "World of Our Own" (single remix) – 3:28
2. "I Promise You That" – 3:35
3. "Angel" (CD ROM video)

European DVD single

1. "World of Our Own" (the video)
2. "World of Our Own" (making of the video)
3. "World of Our Own" (studio recording)
4. "Angel" (video)

Australian CD single

1. "World of Our Own" (single remix)
2. "Crying Girl"
3. "Angel" (remix)

Australian limited-edition CD single

1. "World of Our Own" (single remix)
2. "My Private Movie"
3. CD-ROM picture book and platinum club link

== Credits and personnel ==
Recording

- Recorded at Rokstone Studios, London

Personnel

- Steve Mac – songwriter, producer, arranger, mixing, piano, keyboards
- Wayne Hector – songwriter, additional backing vocals
- Dennis Morgan – songwriter
- Simon Climie – songwriter
- Chris Laws – engineer, drums
- Matt Howe – engineer
- Daniel Pursey – assistant engineer
- Quentin Guine – assistant engineer
- Philipe Rose – assistant engineer

== Charts ==
=== Weekly charts ===
Chart (2002)	Peak position
Australia (ARIA)	21
Austria (Ö3 Austria Top 40)	10
Belgium (Ultratip Bubbling Under Flanders)	3
Belgium (Ultratip Bubbling Under Wallonia)	17
Czech Republic (IFPI)	15
Denmark (Tracklisten)	5
Denmark Airplay (Tracklisten)	6
Europe (Eurochart Hot 100)	4
Europe (European Hit Radio)	5
Finland Airplay (Radiosoittolista)	8
Germany (GfK)	11
Ireland (IRMA)	3
Italy (FIMI)	41
Latvia (Latvijas Top 40)	20
Netherlands (Dutch Top 40)	34
Netherlands (Single Top 100)	29
Netherlands Airplay (Music & Media)	9
New Zealand (Recorded Music NZ)	6
Norway (VG-lista)	13
Poland Airplay (Polish Airplay Charts)	9
Romania (Romanian Top 100)	6
Scottish Singles Sales (Official Charts)	1
Sweden (Sverigetopplistan)	11
Switzerland (Schweizer Hitparade)	26
UK Singles (Official Charts)	1
UK Airplay (Music Week)	3

=== Year-end charts ===
Chart (2002)	Position
Austria (Ö3 Austria Top 40)	59
Europe (Eurochart Hot 100)	88
Europe (European Hit Radio)	21
Germany (Media Control)	68
Ireland (IRMA)	33
New Zealand (RIANZ)	24
Sweden (Hitlistan)	90
UK Singles (OCC)	40
UK Airplay (Music Week)	24

== Certifications and sales ==
Region	Certification	Certified units/sales
Denmark (IFPI Danmark)	Gold	45,000^{‡}
New Zealand (RMNZ)	Gold	15,000^{‡}
United Kingdom (BPI)	Platinum	600,000^{‡}
^{‡} Sales+streaming figures based on certification alone.

== Release history ==
Region	Date	Format(s)	Label(s)	Ref(s).
Sweden	18 February 2002	CD	RCA; BMG	
United Kingdom	18 February 2002	CD	RCA; BMG; S	
Japan	20 March 2002	CD	RCA; BMG	
Australia	1 April 2002	CD	RCA	
United States	5 August 2002	Contemporary hit radio	RCA	
United States	23 September 2002	Rhythmic contemporary radio	RCA	
