= Mark Feehily =

Irish pop singer (born 1980)

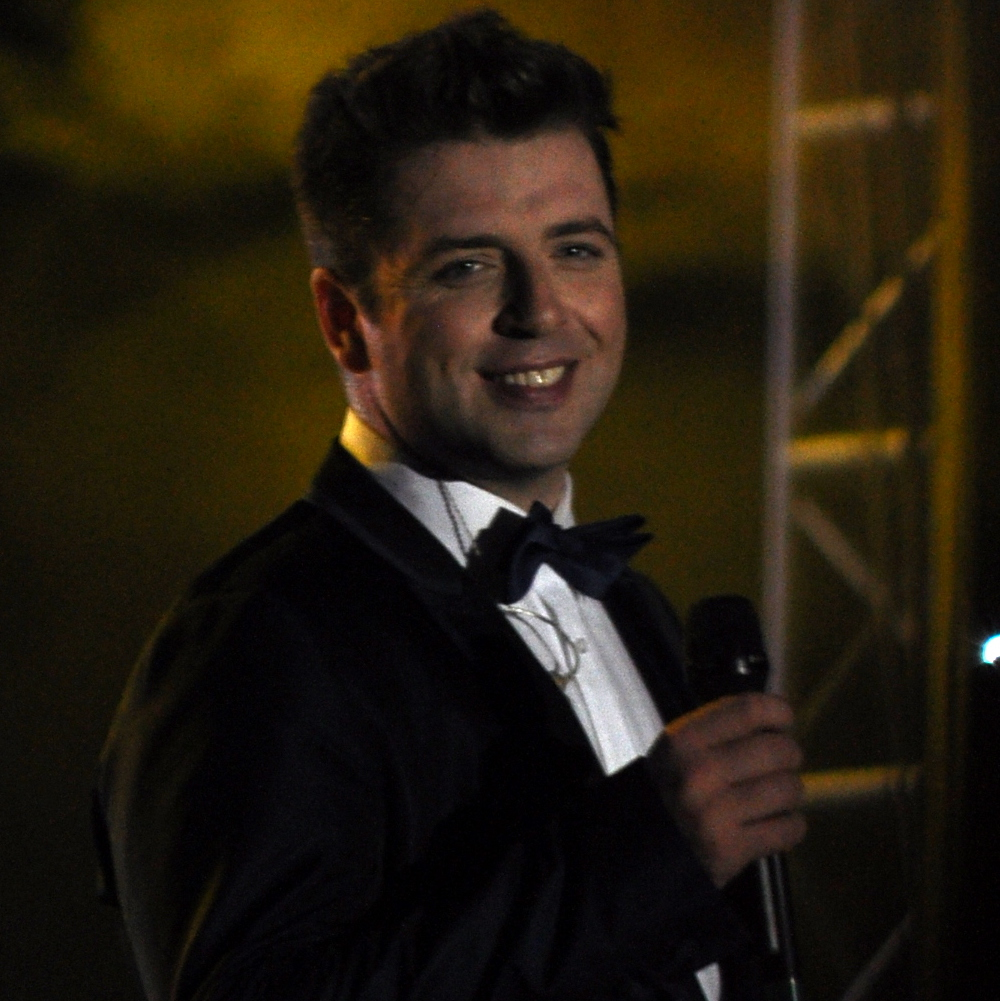
- Feehily performing with Westlife in 2011

Background information
- Born: Markus Michael Patrick Feehily; 28 May 1980 (age 46); Sligo, Ireland
- Genres: Pop; soul; R&B
- Occupations: Singer; songwriter
- Years active: 1998–present
- Labels: BMG (1998–2004); S (2003–2008); Sony BMG (2004–2008); Syco (2009–2011); RCA (1998–2012); Kobalt (2015–present); Universal (2018–present); Virgin (2018–2020); Warner (2021–present); East West (2021–2022); Tencent Music (2024); Sony (2009–2012; 2025-present)
- Member of: Westlife
- Formerly of: Six as One; IOYOU

Markus Michael Patrick Feehily (born 28 May 1980) is an Irish singer, best known as a member and one of the lead singers of the pop vocal group Westlife. Westlife has released twelve albums, embarked on thirteen world tours and won several awards, becoming one of the most successful musical groups of all time. With 15 number one appearances, Feehily is also the highest-charting LGBT singer on the UK Singles Chart.

== Career ==
=== 1998–2012: Six as One, IOYou, Westlife ===
Feehily rose to fame in the boy band Westlife. Before Westlife, Feehily, Shane Filan and Kian Egan were members of the self-formed, six-piece, Sligo-based boy band IOYOU, previously named Six As One, which released the single "Together Girl Forever" and songs "Everlasting Love" and "Good Thing". Louis Walsh, the manager of Boyzone, was contacted by Filan's mother and learned of the group. The final line-up, established on 3 July 1998, consisted of Feehily, Filan and Egan from the original line-up, and Nicky Byrne and Bryan McFadden, new members who auditioned from Dublin. Boyzone singer Ronan Keating was brought in to co-manage the group with Walsh, assuming an advisory role.

Feehily has also co-written several songs, including some with his band members. Feehily has spoken to The Boston Globe of his embarrassment about Westlife's Rat Pack-tribute album, ...Allow Us to Be Frank; he blamed Westlife's label for forcing them to record it after Robbie Williams had success with this type of music. He dismissed the instance as a "weird time" in Westlife's career. Despite this, he has referred to his role in Westlife as "the best job in the world".

=== 2015–2018: Solo career ===
As well as releasing music as part of Westlife, Feehily has also released music as a solo artist, under the name "Markus Feehily" rather than "Mark Feehily", which he was known as in Westlife. In February 2015, Feehily launched his solo career with a radio premiere of his debut single "Love Is a Drug" on RTÉ 2fm in Ireland. The next day the track premiered online, via Wonderland Magazine. Moments after the premiere of the song, it was made available for pre-order on iTunes, with the official video for the track launching on his Vevo channel two weeks later. The song was released on 19 April 2015.

He released his debut solo studio album Fire on 16 October 2015. It includes the singles "Love Is a Drug" and "Butterfly". He was a support act for Wet Wet Wet and Mariah Carey. He was also invited by Russell Crowe at Olympia Theatre, Dublin, 1 October 2017, for his "Dublin Indoor Garden Party gig" to sing "Love Was My Alibi", written by Crowe and Carl Falk for the film The Water Diviner, which Crowe both directed and starred in, accompanied by Alan Doyle and Falk. His second album Christmas, featuring the track "River", a rendition of the song by Joni Mitchell, was released on 1 December 2017.

=== 2018–present: Westlife reunion with new music, concert tour, The Masked Singer and medical break from touring with Westlife ===
In October 2018, a video was posted to Westlife's official social media platforms announcing the group's reunion as a four-piece. In 2019 the group headlined "The 20 Tour", named in honour of Westlife's 20th anniversary since its formation and the release of its first single, "Swear It Again", in 1999. In addition to touring, Westlife also released new music. "Hello My Love", the first single from the group's upcoming album, debuted on the Graham Norton Show on 10 and 11 January 2019. In 2022, Feehily appeared on the third series of The Masked Singer as "Robobunny". He reached the final and finished in third place.

He was in a one night concert version of the musical The Secret Garden as Neville Craven. The production was at the London Palladium on 28 August 2022. He starred opposite acclaimed West End actor Hadley Fraser as his brother Archibald Craven.

In February 2024, Feehily announced that he is unable to tour with the band temporarily due to health issues.

As of July 2026, Feehily is still considered to be a member of Westlife and has been contributing to new music for them.

== Songwriting ==
Feehily has co-written several Westlife songs, all fifteen tracks of his debut solo album and numerous unreleased songs.

He announced on social media that he and Shane Filan co-wrote the new single for Emeli Sandé and Ronan Keating called "One of a Kind" released in 2020.

== Personal life ==
Feehily was born in Sligo, County Sligo in Ireland. His parents are Marie (née Verdon) and Oliver Feehily, and he has two younger brothers as well as many cousins. He has expressed his love for Sligo's picturesque and artistic environment, which he credits for playing a critical role in inspiring his musical aspirations and pursuits. As a child, singing and playing the tin whistle were important elements in his life. His favourite singer has always been Mariah Carey, with whom Westlife collaborated on "Against All Odds (Take a Look at Me Now)". In his teenage years, he also enjoyed playing tennis and football.

In August 2005, he publicly revealed he was gay during an interview with the British tabloid The Sun. Feehily had recognised his sexual orientation when he was 14 or 15 years old. His family, bandmates and close friends knew his sexual orientation. Westlife's manager Louis Walsh, however, was unaware of Feehily's sexual orientation when he began managing the group. As the only gay member of Westlife, Feehily had kept his sexual orientation private. Unlike his bandmates, Feehily did not discuss his private life in interviews, although he had dated women prior to his coming out. In yet another interview, he told The Sydney Morning Herald that despite the fact that the majority of Westlife's fans are female, there had really been no negative reaction.

During the interview with The Sun, Feehily also announced his romantic relationship with British fashion photographer Kevin McDaid, a member of the now-defunct British boy band V. The pair, who lived together, had been dating since January 2005 after having met at a Cheerios Childline Concert in Ireland. Feehily said that while he did not intend to get married right away, he was happy to know he could form a civil partnership in Britain with the recent passing of the Civil Partnership Act. In December 2007, Feehily and Kevin appeared on the cover of Attitude. The couple became engaged in February 2010. On 31 December 2011, Feehily announced via his Twitter account that the couple had split up.

Feehily is interested in charity work and supports the charity group Aware. He was shortlisted in 2011 as one of the top 50 most influential gay individuals. He congratulated his local football club Sligo Rovers on its victory in the 2011 FAI Cup Final.

On 22 February 2019, he announced his engagement to Cailean O'Neill through his Instagram account, during their holiday on Hurawalhi in the Maldives. On 3 October, Feehily and O'Neill announced the birth of their daughter Layla via surrogacy.

== Discography ==
=== Albums ===
| Title | Details | Peak chart positions | | |
| Title | Details | IRE | UK | SCO |
|---|---|---|---|---|
| Fire | Released: 16 October 2015; Label: Harmoney Entertainment; Format: CD, digital download, streaming | 2 | 25 | 17 |
| Christmas | Released: 1 December 2017; Label: Harmoney Entertainment; Format: Digital download, CD | — | — | — |

=== Singles ===
| Year | Title | Peak chart positions | | | Album |
| Year | Title | IRE | UK | SCO | Album |
|---|---|---|---|---|---|
| 2015 | "Love Is a Drug" | 65 | 56 | 27 | Fire |
| 2015 | "Butterfly" | — | — | — | Fire |
| 2016 | "Sanctuary" | — | — | — | Fire |

=== Music videos ===
==== As lead artist ====
List of videos, showing year released and director
| Title | Year | Director |
|---|---|---|
| "Love Is a Drug" | 2015 | Naroop |
| "Butterfly" | 2015 | Unknown |
| "Sanctuary" | 2016 | Conor Gorman |

== Concert tours ==
=== Headlining ===
==== As a solo performer ====
Setlist (2015)

1. "Wash the Pain Away"
2. "Cut You Out"
3. "Sirens"
4. "What Makes a Man"
5. "Butterfly"
6. "Only You"
7. "Fire"
8. "Talk Me Down"
9. "Back to Yours"
10. "Flying Without Wings"
11. "Love Me or Leave Me Alone"
12. "You Raise Me Up"
13. "Your Love Is a Drug"

| Date | Country | City | Venue |
Europe
| 4 March 2015 | Republic of Ireland and United Kingdom | London | Scala |
| 8 March 2015 | Republic of Ireland and United Kingdom | Dublin | Olympia Theatre |
| 9 March 2015 | Republic of Ireland and United Kingdom | Glasgow | O2 ABC |
| 23 February 2016 | Republic of Ireland and United Kingdom | Dublin | 3Arena |
| 24 February 2016 | Republic of Ireland and United Kingdom | Belfast | SSE Arena |
| 9 March 2016 | Republic of Ireland and United Kingdom | Cardiff | Motorpoint Arena Cardiff |
| 18 December 2017 | Republic of Ireland and United Kingdom | Belfast | Empire Music Hall |
| 19 December 2017 | Republic of Ireland and United Kingdom | Dublin | The Sugar Club |

=== Supporting ===
==== Mariah Carey (2017) ====
| Date | Venue | City | Country | Sellouts/Shows | Attendance/Capacity | Revenue |
Leg 5 — Europe
| 10 December 2017 | Manchester Arena | Manchester | England | 1/1 | 9,371 / 9,371 (100%) | $927,176 |
| 11 December 2017 | The O2 Arena | London | England | 0/1 | 15,074/16,290 (92%) | $1,525,000 |

== Honours and awards ==
| Year | Ceremony | Category | Result |
|---|---|---|---|
| 2013 | The Galas | Artist/Entertainer of the Year | Won |
