= I Need Your Help Barry Manilow =

Single by Ray Stevens

from the album The Feeling's Not Right Again
- B-side: "Daydream Romance"
- Released: March 1979
- Genre: Parody
- Length: 3:44
- Label: Warner Bros. Records
- Songwriter: Dale Gonyea
- Producer: Ray Stevens

Ray Stevens singles chronology
"Be Your Own Best Friend" (1978)	"I Need Your Help Barry Manilow" (1979)	"Shriner's Convention" (1980)

Music video
- "I Need Your Help Barry Manilow" on YouTube

"I Need Your Help Barry Manilow" is a 1979 song by Dale Gonyea, sung by Ray Stevens. It was the first track on Stevens' album, The Feeling's Not Right Again. The single's release in March preceded the release of the album in June.

The single was nominated for a Grammy Award for Best Comedy Recording and reached number 49 on the US Billboard Hot 100. It spent a total of eight weeks on the chart. On the Cash Box Top 100, it peaked at number 34. It also charted in Canada and Australia.

== Background ==
As with most of Stevens' songs, "I Need Your Help Barry Manilow" features a comedic story line. It also uses riffs reminiscent of many of Manilow's best known hits, led off with a musical phrase resembling the opening of "I Write the Songs". The fictional singer recounts a litany of unfortunate events in his life, some of which are comically trivial or nonsensical. He reaches the conclusion that he needs Manilow to sing one of his more melancholy and wistful songs to comfort him, as several of Manilow's biggest hits have story lines about suffering and misfortune, particularly in love gone awry. The second half of the second verse switches to a recitation that incorporates the titles of several Manilow songs in the monologue: "Mandy", "Copacabana", "Can't Smile Without You", "Weekend in New England", "Could It Be Magic" and "Tryin' to Get the Feeling Again". The song also makes reference to MasterCharge, the San Andreas Fault, gossip columnist Rona Barrett, and a slogan for Dristan nasal spray.

Just as the album's cover art is a spoof of Manilow's album Tryin' to Get the Feeling, so the single's cover art is a spoof of Manilow's album Barry Manilow II.

== Chart history ==
=== Weekly charts ===
Chart (1979)	Peak position
Australia (Kent Music Report)	92
Canada RPM Top Singles	63
US Billboard Hot 100	49
US Cashbox Top 100	34
US Billboard Adult Contemporary	11
US Country	85
