= Barry Manilow (disambiguation) =

Barry Manilow (born 1943) is an American singer-songwriter.

Barry Manilow may also refer to:

- Barry Manilow (1973 album), an album by Barry Manilow, later issued as Barry Manilow I
- Barry Manilow II, a 1974 album by Manilow
- Barry Manilow (1989 album), an album by Manilow
