= With a Smile =

With a Smile could refer to:

== Film and TV ==
- With a Smile (TV series), a Filipino television series
- With a Smile (film) (Avec le sourire), a 1936 Maurice Chevalier comedy film

== Music ==
- "With a Smile" (song), a song by Filipino band Eraserheads
- With a Smile, album by David T. Walker, 2007
- "With a Smile", song by Gladys Knight from the album Many Different Roads
- "With a Smile", song by Ray Stevens from album Be Your Own Best Friend
- "With a Smile", song by Royal Bliss
