= Could It Be Magic =

1971 single by Barry Manilow

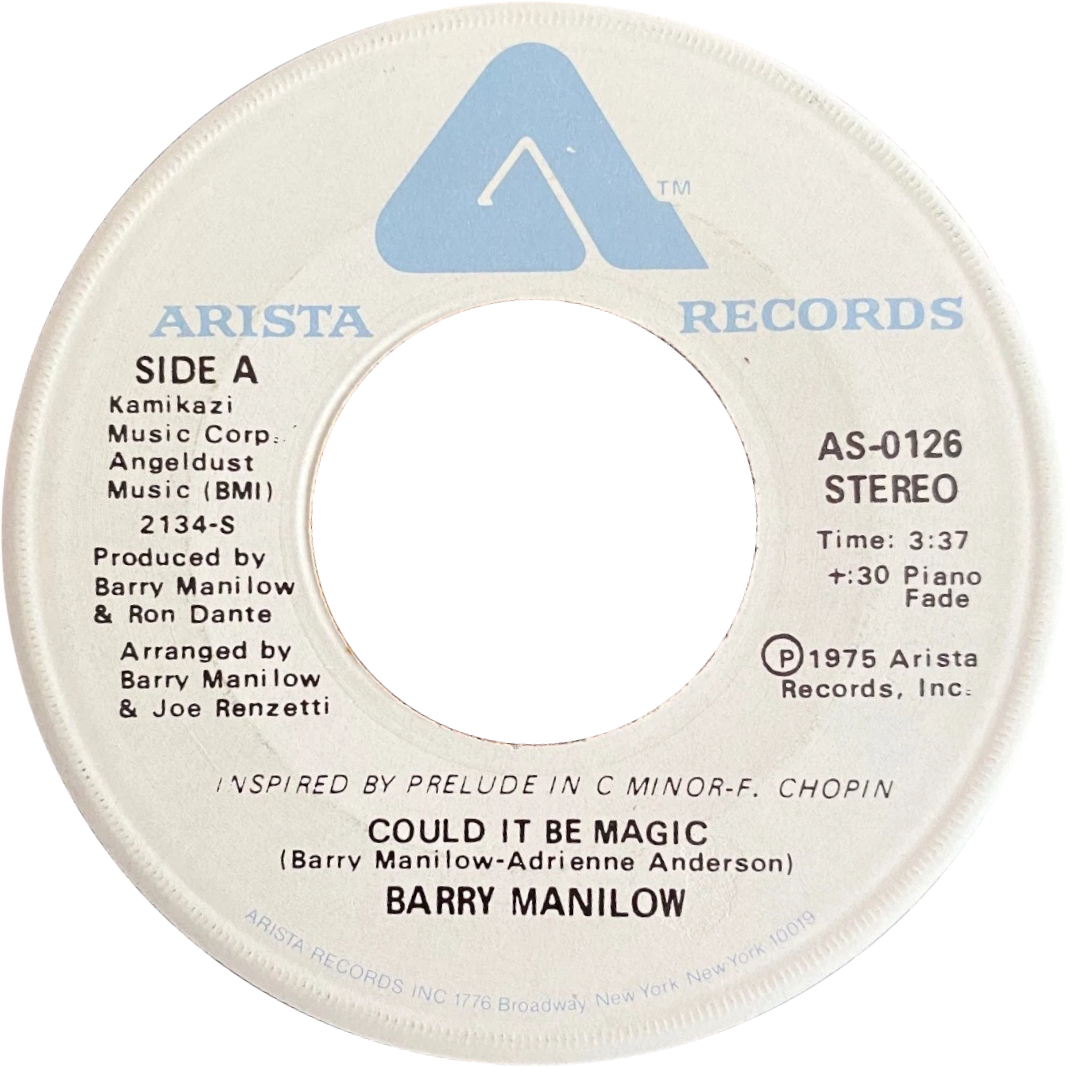
- A-side label of the US single

Single by Barry Manilow

from the album Barry Manilow
- A-side: "Cloudburst" (1973 solo version)
- B-side: "Morning" (Featherbed); "I Am Your Child" (1975 solo version)
- Released: 1971 (Featherbed version); 1973 (Barry Manilow version)
- Recorded: 1970, 1973, 1975
- Genre: Soft rock
- Length: 2:12 (Featherbed version); 7:17 (1973 solo version); 6:50 (1975 solo version); 4:14 (1975 solo edit)
- Label: Bell (1973); Arista (1975)
- Songwriters: Barry Manilow; Frédéric Chopin (music); Adrienne Anderson (1973 version); Tony Orlando (1971 version) (lyrics)
- Producers: Tony Orlando (1971 version); Barry Manilow, Ron Dante (1973 and 1975 versions)

Barry Manilow singles chronology
"Sweet Water Jones" (1973)	"Could It Be Magic" (1973)	"Let's Take Some Time to Say Goodbye" (1974)

Audio
- "Could It Be Magic" (1975 album version) by Barry Manilow on YouTube
- "Could It Be Magic" (1975 single edit) by Barry Manilow on YouTube

Live video
- "Could It Be Magic" (2008, live from Ft. Lauderdale) by Barry Manilow on YouTube
"It's a Miracle" (1975)	"Could It Be Magic" (1975)	"I Write the Songs" (1975)

"Could It Be Magic" is a song written by Adrienne Anderson and composed by American singer-songwriter Barry Manilow, inspired by Frédéric Chopin's Prelude in C minor, Opus 28, Number 20.

The song was initially released in 1971 by Featherbed (a group of session musicians featuring Barry Manilow), produced and co-written by Tony Orlando. It was later re-recorded as a Manilow solo track on his first album released in 1973 on Bell Records. It was then reworked in 1975 and released as a single from his eponymous album re-issued by Arista Records. The 1975 release became Manilow's third hit after "Mandy" and "It's A Miracle".

The song has been recorded by a number of other artists over the years, most successfully by Donna Summer (1976, UK no. 40/US no. 52) and by Take That (1992, UK no. 3). In February 1993 the version by Take That won the Brit Award for British Single of 1992.

== Composition ==
Manilow wrote "Could It Be Magic" one night while he was living in a studio apartment on 27th Street in Manhattan. He had been playing Chopin on the piano that afternoon, and the tune inspired by Chopin then came to him. Manilow built the song by elaborating on part of Chopin's Prelude Op. 28, No. 20, and the source of the inspiration is made explicit in Manilow's own recording, which quotes directly eight bars of Prelude No. 20 at the start, and ends the same way by returning to the Prelude. The basic shape of the song is that of a single great crescendo; as Manilow explained, he wanted the song to "build and build" like the Beatles's "Hey Jude" "until you think you can't take it anymore. It should be a musical orgasm."

Manilow sent a cassette tape of his tune to his collaborator Adrienne Anderson, who responded enthusiastically to the song, as did Tony Orlando, vice-president of Columbia/CBS Music, who also contributed lyrics to the version of the song he then produced for the Featherbed, which is significantly different from the solo version Manilow himself had envisioned.

== Featherbed original version ==
Barry Manilow was signed by Tony Orlando to New York City-based Bell Records in 1969, and Orlando produced a few songs released under the name of Featherbed, a "ghost" group consisting of session musicians including Manilow. This ensemble had a minor success with "Amy" in 1971, a song written by Anderson and performed by Manilow. Manilow at that stage had only composed or arranged commercial jingles, and the arrangement of the backing track for "Could It Be Magic" was left to Orlando after they had a discussion about the song's arrangement. Although Manilow had envisioned a song that builds up like "Hey Jude", Orlando produced and arranged it instead as an uptempo bubblegum pop single with a dance beat and cowbells that more resembled Orlando's own "Knock Three Times".

This early version of "Magic" was released as a song by Featherbed on the Bell Records label. Manilow hated the Orlando arrangement in Featherbed's version so severely that, as he has said in numerous subsequent interviews, he was appreciative of the fact that the song went nowhere on the charts. However, he has been quoted in recent years as having somewhat softened his opinion of the track, saying it's "kind of catchy". Apart from the chorus, the lyrics of Featherbed's recording have nothing to do with the version Manilow himself recorded for his debut album in 1973 and in 1975.

== Barry Manilow solo versions ==
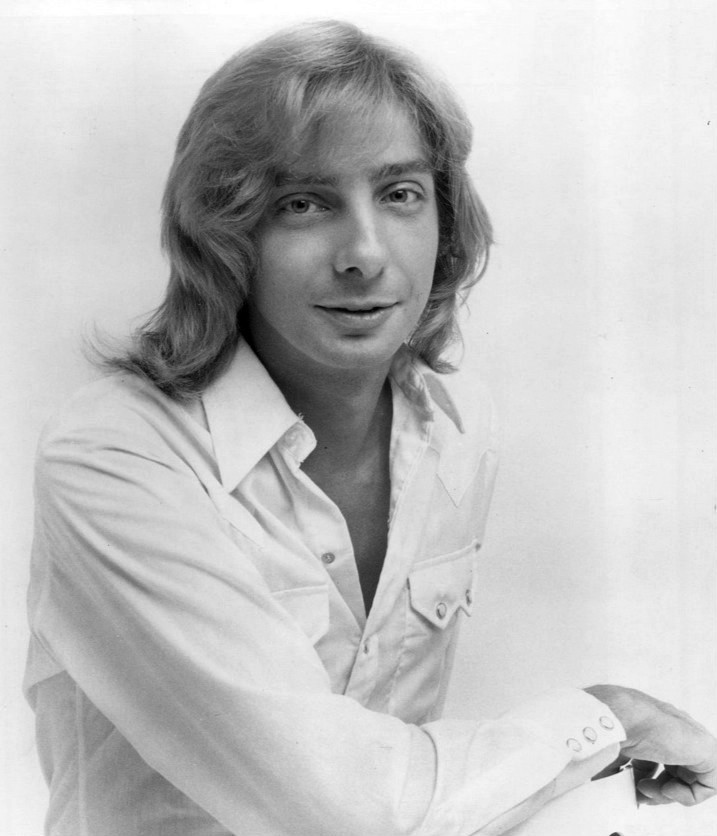
Manilow in a 1975 publicity photo

Manilow co-produced a slower-tempo version of the song with Ron Dante. Although the chorus of this version is similar to the Featherbed version, the rest of the lyrics are completely different. The "Sweet Melissa" in the lyrics is said to refer to singer Melissa Manchester, who was Manilow's label-mate and a back-up singer to Bette Midler in the early 1970s. It was released on his debut album Barry Manilow in 1973, and it also served as the B-side to the single "Cloudburst".

Six months later, former Columbia Records president Clive Davis took over Bell Records and merged it into Arista with all the other Columbia Pictures-owned labels. Most of the artists at Bell were dropped during the merger, but Manilow was brought over to Arista in the spring of 1975. Due to the success of Manilow’s second album Barry Manilow II, it was decided that Manilow's debut album would be re-released under the Arista label, to be retitled Barry Manilow I. Manilow and Dante reworked four songs in April 1975 for the re-release, including a slightly altered version of "Could It Be Magic", co-arranged with Joe Renzetti. Clive Davis heard the song and decided to release it as a single for the Arista re-release despite its length of nearly 7 minutes (most singles then were around 3 minutes long), reasoning that even if it failed to make an impact, people's attention would be diverted by Manilow's soon-to-be-released third album. To make the song radio-friendly, it was shortened to just over 4 minutes for its single release by cutting the bridge in half, deleting the first half of the second verse, and reducing the number of repeats in the final chorus.

The single turned out to be successful, and it reached number 6 in the United States. Cash Box said that "a glowing arrangement by Manilow and Ron Dante grace the familiar melody which is augmented with a strong, vocal interpretation by Manilow". Record World said that "Chopin's Prelude in C Minor gave Barry the original inspiration for this one" and that they expected it to go to the Top 10.

The song also reached number 25 on the UK charts when it was issued as a single in 1978.

The song was again reworked in 1993 using the earlier orchestration of brass and strings, combining it with new drums, bass and synthesizers. This version was included on the album Greatest Hits: The Platinum Collection. An extended remix of the 1993 version was issued as a promotional 12" single and included on the 12" single of "I'd Really Love to See You Tonight".

=== Charts ===
==== Weekly charts ====
Chart (1975)	Peak position
Australia (Kent Music Report)	70
Canada Top Singles (RPM)	4
Canada Adult Contemporary (RPM)	3
Ireland (IRMA)	18
UK Singles (Official Charts)	25
US Billboard Hot 100	6
US Adult Contemporary (Billboard)	4
US Cash Box Top 100	7

==== Year-end charts ====
Chart (1975)	Rank
Canada (RPM)	41
US Billboard Hot 100	37
US Cash Box Top 100	36

== Donna Summer version ==
"Could It Be Magic"
- Side A of the Australian single

Single by Donna Summer

from the album A Love Trilogy
- B-side: "Whispering Waves"
- Released: January 11, 1976
- Studio: Musicland (Munich, Germany)
- Genre: Disco
- Length: 3:15 (single edit)
- Label: Oasis
- Composers: Barry Manilow, Frédéric Chopin
- Lyricist: Adrienne Anderson
- Producers: Giorgio Moroder, Pete Bellotte

Donna Summer singles chronology
"Virgin Mary" (1975)	"Could It Be Magic" (1976)	"Try Me, I Know We Can Make It" (1976)

Audio
- "Prelude to Love" by Donna Summer on YouTube
- "Could It Be Magic" (album version) by Donna Summer on YouTube
- "Could It Be Magic" (single edit) by Donna Summer on YouTube

Performance video
- "Could It Be Magic" (from The Midnight Special, 1976) by Donna Summer on YouTube

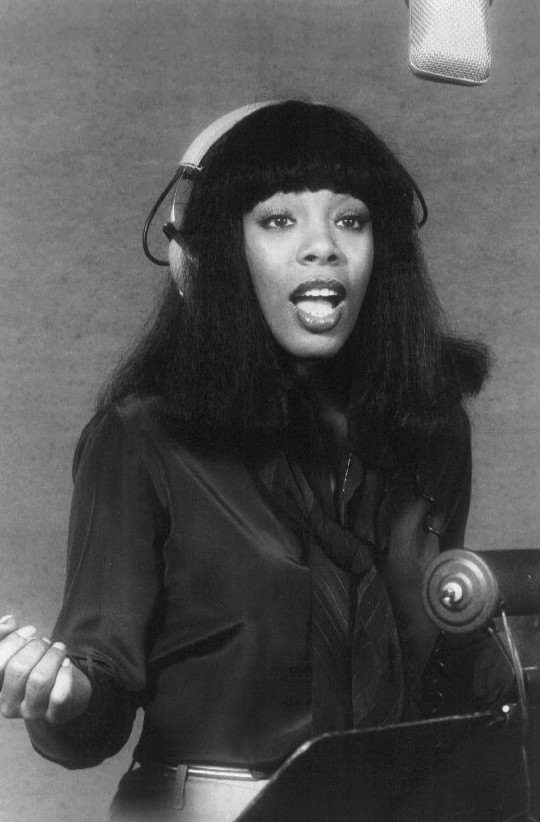
Donna Summer (pictured in 1977) recorded the song in 1975, the same year Manilow's version was released as a single.

Just seven months after Manilow's original version was released as a single, American singer Donna Summer recorded a disco version of the track and included it on her third studio album, A Love Trilogy (1976), and took it to number three on the US Billboard Dance chart in 1976. The song also entered the UK Singles Chart where it stayed for seven weeks (peak point No. 40). Summer changed the lyrics of "sweet Melissa" to "sweet Peter" as an ode to her boyfriend at the time, Peter Mühldorfer.

=== Track listing ===
- US 7" single (Oasis OC 405) / Canada 7" single (Oasis OC 405X)
1. "Could It Be Magic" – 3:15
2. "Whispering Waves" – 4:50
- UK 7" single (GTO GT 60)
1. "Could It Be Magic" – 3:15
2. "Whispering Waves" – 4:50
- Germany 7" single (Atlantic ATL 10 775)
1. "Could It Be Magic" – 5:20
2. "Come With Me" – 4:20
- Netherlands 7" single (Groovy GR 1219)
1. "Could It Be Magic" – 3:15
2. "Whispering Waves" – 4:50
- France 7" single (Atlantic 10.770)
1. "Could It Be Magic" – 4:13
2. "Whispering Waves" – 4:15
- Italy 7" single (Durium DE 2873)
1. "Could It Be Magic" – 3:15
2. "Whispering Waves" – 3:35

=== Charts ===
==== Weekly charts ====
Chart (1976–2012)	Peak position
Austria (Ö3 Austria Top 40)	14
Belgium (Ultratop 50 Flanders)	5
Belgium (Ultratop 50 Wallonia)	4
Canada Top Singles (RPM)	64
France (SNEP)	105
Italy (Musica e dischi)	6
Netherlands (Dutch Top 40)	2
Netherlands (Single Top 100)	5
South Africa (Springbok)	10
UK Singles (Official Charts)	40
US Billboard Hot 100	52
US Adult Contemporary (Billboard)	47
US Hot R&B/Hip-Hop Songs (Billboard)	21
West Germany (GfK)	23

==== Year-end charts ====
Chart (1976)	Position
Belgium (Ultratop Flanders)	35
Netherlands (Dutch Top 40)	14
Netherlands (Single Top 100)	20

=== Certifications ===
Region	Certification	Certified units/sales
Philippines (PARI)	Platinum	120,000

== Take That version ==
"Could It Be Magic"
- UK Maxi-CD cover

Single by Take That

from the album Take That & Party
- Released: November 30, 1992
- Genre: Dance-pop; disco
- Length: 3:30
- Label: RCA
- Composers: Barry Manilow; Frédéric Chopin
- Lyricist: Adrienne Anderson
- Producers: Billy Griffin; Ian Levine; the Rapino Brothers (remix)

Take That singles chronology
"A Million Love Songs" (1992)	"Could It Be Magic" (1992)	"Why Can't I Wake Up with You" (1993)

Music video
- "Could It Be Magic" on YouTube

Produced by Billy Griffin and Ian Levine and remixed by the Rapino Brothers, English boy band Take That released their cover version, based on Donna Summer/Giorgio Moroder's up-tempo arrangement of the track, on November 30, 1992, by RCA Records, as the final single from their debut album, Take That & Party (1992). The song does not appear on the cassette version of the album but was issued as a cassette single. It peaked at number three on the UK Singles Chart and was featured in that year's Only Fools and Horses Christmas special "Mother Nature's Son" in the background of one of the scenes. The single reached the top 10 in Belgium, Ireland, Israel, Portugal, Singapore, and the United Kingdom. On the Eurochart Hot 100, "Could It Be Magic" peaked at number nine. Its music video was directed by Saffie Ashtiany. The song won Take That their first major award: Best British Single at the 1993 Brit Awards.

During The Ultimate Tour in 2006, former member Robbie Williams appeared on a hologram with a pre-recorded section of his vocals. Gary Barlow has sung lead vocals since Take That's reformation.

The song has received a Silver sales status certification and has sold over 345,000 copies in the UK.

=== Critical reception ===
In his review of the Take That & Party album, Peter Fawthrop from AllMusic wrote, "Hearing Robbie Williams on the tracks here, especially his lead on the cover of Barry Manilow's 'Could It Be Magic', brings back a feeling of lost innocence and a perspective on the changing of times." In his weekly UK chart commentary, James Masterton said, "Cleverly they change it from a ballad into a medium-tempo pop/dance tune but although it is also fancied for Christmas No.1 it is just not as strong as songs like 'A Million Love Songs', their last hit which may well have been a better choice for a Christmas single." David Bennun from Melody Maker complimented its "all puppyish enthusiasm and Northern Soul beats." Alex Kadis from Smash Hits named it a "spectacular stomperama". Another Smash Hits editor, Sylvia Patterson, gave it two out of five, writing that "the That cannot sing like Barry Manilow". Wayne Garcia from St. Petersburg Times named it the "low point" of the album, describing the song as "a synth-disco remake".

=== Music video ===
A music video was produced to promote the single, directed by Saffie Ashtiany. It shows a young woman leaving a garage before the lights are turned back on and Take That perform the song with many other dancers. It was filmed at Bray Studios, Water Oakley, Windsor, Berkshire in 1992. David Bennun from Melody Maker felt that Take That videos as "Could It Be Magic" "were perfect. The image, the moment, the feeling. The way the boys perform, delighted, for each other's delectation on "Could It Be Magic" before the necessary intrusion of the girls."

=== Track listings ===
- UK 7-inch vinyl and cassette
1. Rapino Radio Mix – 3:30
2. Take That Radio Megamix – 4:38
- UK 12-inch vinyl
1. Deep In Rapino's Club Mix – 5:56
2. Take That Club Megamix – 7:03
3. Mr. F. Mix – 6:18
- European CD single
1. Rapino Radio Mix – 3:30
2. Deep In Rapino's Club Mix – 5:56
3. Ciao Baby Mix – 7:19
4. Paparazzo Mix – 5:27
- UK CD single
1. Rapino Radio Mix – 3:30
2. Deep In Rapino's Club Mix – 5:56
3. Acapella – 3:12
4. Ciao Baby Mix – 7:19
5. Rapino Dub – 3:44
6. Paparazzo Mix – 5:27
7. Deep In Rapino's Dub – 5:57
8. Club Rapino Mix – 3:43

=== Personnel ===
- Robbie Williams – lead vocals
- Gary Barlow – backing vocals
- Howard Donald – backing vocals
- Jason Orange – backing vocals
- Mark Owen – backing vocals

=== Charts ===
==== Weekly charts ====
Chart (1992–1993)	Peak position
Australia (ARIA)	30
Belgium (Ultratop 50 Flanders)	8
Denmark (IFPI)	28
Europe (Eurochart Hot 100)	9
Europe (European AC Radio)	24
Europe (European Hit Radio)	13
France (SNEP)	42
France Airplay (SNEP)	46
Germany (GfK)	37
Greece (IFPI Greece)	2
Ireland (IRMA)	3
Israel (Israeli Singles Chart)	5
Netherlands (Dutch Top 40 Tipparade)	16
Netherlands (Single Top 100 Tipparade)	15
Portugal (AFP)	8
Singapore (SPVA)	4
Spain Airplay (Top 40 Radio)	15
Sweden (Sverigetopplistan)	30
UK Singles (Official Charts)	3
UK Airplay (Music Week)	4
UK Dance (Music Week)	32
UK Club Chart (Music Week)	100

==== Year-end charts ====
Chart (1992)	Rank
UK Singles (OCC)	37

Chart (1993)	Rank
Belgium (Ultratop 50 Flanders)	67
UK Singles (OCC)	94

=== Certifications ===
Region	Certification	Certified units/sales
United Kingdom (BPI)	Silver	345,000

=== Release history ===
Region	Date	Format(s)	Label(s)	Ref.
United Kingdom	November 30, 1992	7-inch vinyl; 12-inch vinyl; CD; cassette	RCA	
Australia	February 21, 1993	CD; cassette	RCA	

== Other notable versions ==
- French singer Alain Chamfort released a French-language version of the song under the title "Le temps qui court" in 1975. Chamfort's version was later covered by boy band Alliage in 1997. Their version peaked at number 13 in France and number 32 in Belgium (Wallonia). This version was covered by Les Enfoirés in 2006, reaching number four in France, number two in Belgium (Wallonia) and number 19 in Switzerland.
