= Turnaround (Westlife album) =

Studio album by Westlife
- Released: 24 November 2003
- Recorded: Late 2002–September 2003
- Studios: Rokstone Studios, (London); Olympic Studios, (London); Sphere Studios, (London); The Location, (Stockholm, Sweden); Quiz & Larossi, (Stockholm, Sweden); Angel Recording Studios, (London, England); Sony Music Studios London, (London)
- Genres: Pop; pop rock
- Length: 43:54
- Labels: BMG; RCA; S
- Producers: Cutfather & Joe; Jake Schulze; Karl Engström; Quiz & Larossi; Steve Mac

Westlife chronology
Unbreakable – The Greatest Hits Volume 1 (2002)	Turnaround (2003)	...Allow Us to Be Frank (2004)

Alternative cover
- Special edition cover

Singles from Turnaround
- 1. "Hey Whatever" Released: 15 September 2003; 2. "Mandy" Released: 10 November 2003; 3. "Obvious" Released: 23 February 2004

Turnaround is the fourth studio album by Irish boy band Westlife, released on 24 November 2003 by BMG. The first single released was the upbeat track, "Hey Whatever". The next single was a cover of the Barry Manilow hit, "Mandy". The band's version earned them their 12th UK number one and an Irish record of the year award. "Obvious", an original song, was the third and final single released from the album.

Turnaround was also the last album to be recorded with their full original lineup with member Brian McFadden, who left the band in March the following year. The album was the 23rd best selling album of 2003 in the UK. The album was re-released in a box set on 25 January 2005 with their debut album, Westlife. The album received favourable reviews from music critics, while it attained commercial success, topping the UK and Ireland charts, while reaching the top-ten in many countries.

== Background and McFadden's departure ==
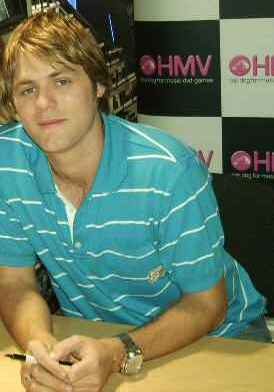
Brian McFadden stated that he left Westlife for his family and children.

After three successful albums, Westlife (1999), Coast to Coast (2000) and World of Our Own (2001), the band released their first greatest hits album, Unbreakable: The Greatest Hits Volume 1, in 2002, amidst rumours of a split. After the greatest hits, the band released Turnaround as their fourth studio album, on 24 November 2003. Kian Egan said, "the passion and love we have for Westlife is still 100%", and the group felt that Turnaround is their best album yet.

Turnaround was the band's final album with lead vocalist Brian McFadden, who left the group three weeks prior to embarking on their fourth world tour, stating that, "It's hard to juggle two lives when you've got a family." He subsequently re-emerged as a solo artist and professed disgruntlement over the requirements associated with boy band captivity. When interviewed by Wil Marlow of The Journal, McFadden said, "I was standing there trying to sing a song like "Mandy" and be all emotional when I've never even met a Mandy."

== Music ==
"Turnaround" is a pop album, with many songs being "down-tempo" ballads, mixing with plenty of "upbeat" tracks, as well. The album features 2 covers and 10 new tracks. It features writing contribution from Wayne Hector, Steve Mac, Diane Warren, Andreas Carlsson and others.

The album kicks off with "Mandy", who first hit the charts, as "Brandy", 32 years ago before Barry Manilow renamed it "Mandy" and took it to number 11 in 1975. "Hey Whatever" is an upbeat pop song with gospel influence, with its "shun-the-world-and-find-your-bliss" message, "Why don't you liberate your mind / Let your colour fill the sky," the sing. "Obvious" is a soft ballad, with backing vocals that sound "either wistful or magical," according to Peter Fawthrop of Allmusic. Eamonn McCuske of The Digital Fix commented that the song "bears similarity to Take That's Back For Good.

"When a Woman Loves a Man" was considered a "classic Westlife ballad," while the title track "Turn Around" has funky, electronic, 80s influences, being called "heavily synthesised." Diane Warren contributed to the ballad "I Did It for You," while "Thank You" is another "upbeat" track. "To Be with You is a re-recording of the Mr. Big song. It was named a "faithful" and "nevertheless adequate" cover. "Home" was considered a "soaring ballad." Final track "What Do They Know" closes the album off, tying all the styles together.

== Promotion ==
=== Singles ===
The album's lead-single "Hey Whatever" attained success, reaching number 4 on the UK Singles Chart, therefore becoming the lowest-charting single from the album. It eventually was a success around the world, reaching number 2 in Denmark and Ireland, number 5 in Sweden and the top-forty in some other countries. The album's second single, "Mandy", topped the UK Singles Chart, becoming their 12th number one hit on the UK charts. The song also topped the Irish Singles Chart and was a success in Europe, reaching the top-ten in Denmark and Sweden and the top-twenty in Austria, Germany and Norway. The third single, "Obvious," was also a success, reaching number 2 in Ireland, number 3 in the UK and number 7 in Denmark, while also charting in many countries.

== Critical reception ==
Professional ratings
Review scores
Source	Rating
AllMusic	3/5 stars
MTV Asia	4/10
NZgirl	3.5/5 stars
RTÉ.ie	3/5 stars
The Music Fix	2/10
Yahoo! Music UK	1/10

Turnaround received generally favourable reviews from music critics. Peter Fawthrop of AllMusic gave the album a rating of 3 out of 5 stars, writing that " Turnaround involves a pebble toss toward rock, and it's all the better for it. If it had gone all the way, if it had found a producer willing to risk fortunes on morphing a pop group into a rock group, something remarkable may have happened. As it stands, it is a notch above typical, but only a notch." Linda McGee of RTÉ.ie gave the album 3 out of 5 stars, commenting, "Refreshingly, much of the material reveals a grittier side to the band that was never evident before. By finding a formula that was capable of sticking the distance, Westlife have defied the odds by making it to their fifth album. Few would have thought it. Vocally, 'Turnaround' is faultless. Commercially, you've got to hand it to the lads on a market sewn up."

Clea Marshall of NZ Girl called it "upbeat, catchy and slick," writing, "this album is quintessential Westlife. Easy on the ears, 'Turnaround' is sure to bring a smile to any pop fan's face." Jack Smith of BBC Music called it "average," declaring that, "The title Westlife chose is lost on us because this seems like more of the same from the puppy-dog-eyed five piece." Eamonn McCusker of The Digital Fix commented that the songs "all sound somewhat alike with there being precious little to get excited about across any of the thirteen tracks here."

== Commercial performance ==
Turnaround debuted at number-one on the UK Albums Chart, becoming the band's fourth album to debut at the top. It spent 21 weeks on the chart. It also debuted at number-one on the Irish Albums Chart, spending a further week at the top. It spent a total of 18 weeks inside the chart. The album was also successful in Sweden, where it debuted at number 10, on 28 November 2003. Later, it climbed to number 6, while in its third week, it peaked at number 5, on 12 December 2003.

In Denmark, the album debuted at number 4 on the Danish Albums Chart on 5 December 2003. It spent 16 weeks on the chart. In Austria, the album debuted and peaked at number 42 on the Austrian Albums Chart, on 7 December 2003. Later, it fell to number 63, while in its third week, it climbed to number 53. After weeks fluctuating the charts, the album jumped from number 73 to number 60. After the jump, it climbed to number 48. It spent 10 weeks on the chart.

== Track listing ==
Turnaround track listing
No.	Title	Writer(s)	Producer(s)	Length
1.	"Mandy"	Scott English; Richard Kerr	Steve Mac	3:21
2.	"Hey Whatever"	Wayne Hector; Mac; Carl Papenfus; Ken Papenfus	Mac	3:30
3.	"Heal"	Nick Jarl; Savan Kotecha	Mac	3:08
4.	"Obvious"	Pilot; Savan Kotecha; Andreas Carlsson	Jake Schulz; Kristian Lundin; Karl Engström; Quiz & Larossi (add.)	3:32
5.	"When a Woman Loves a Man"	Andreas Romdhane; Kotecha; Jimmy McCarthy	Quiz & Larossi	3:39
6.	"On My Shoulder"	Hector; Mac	Mac	3:58
7.	"Turn Around"	Hector; Mac	Mac	4:23
8.	"I Did It for You"	Diane Warren; Mac	Mac	3:31
9.	"Thank You"	Hector; Mac; Simon Perry	Mac	4:04
10.	"To Be with You"	David Grahame; Eric Martin	Mac	3:22
11.	"Home"	Hector; Mac	Mac	4:06
12.	"What Do They Know?"	Hector; Mac; Don Black; McCarthy	Mac	3:20
Total length:				43:54

Japanese bonus tracks
No.	Title	Writer(s)	Producer(s)	Length
12.	"Lost in You*"	Tommy Sims; Wayne Kirkpatrick; Gordon Kennedy	Cutfather & Joe	3:37
14.	"Never Knew I Was Losing You"	Brian McFadden; Shane Filan; Markus Feehily; Kian Egan; Nicky Byrne	Steve Robson	4:42
Total length:				52:13

- Is track 12 while What Do They Know? is track 13.

Asian edition bonus Karaoke VCD
No.	Title	Length
1.	"Mandy"
2.	"If I Let You Go"
3.	"My Love"
4.	"Flying Without Wings"
5.	"When You're Looking Like That"
6.	"Swear It Again"
7.	"I Have a Dream"
8.	"Seasons in the Sun"
9.	"Hey Whatever" (music video)

== Credits ==
- Arranged by [Strings]:
  Dave Arch (tracks: 1, 3, 8)
  Henrik And Ulf Jansson (tracks: 4, 5)
  Tue Røh* (track 12)
  Wil Malone (tracks: 6, 11)
- Bass:
  Andreas "Quiz" Romdhane (track 4)
  Steve Pearce (tracks: 2, 3, 6, 8 to 11)
- Drums:
  Brett Morgan (track 3)
  Chris Laws (tracks: 1, 2, 6, 7, 9, 11)
  Ian Thomas (tracks: 1, 6 to 8, 10, 11)
  Ralph Salmins (track 2)
- Engineer:
  Chris Laws (tracks: 1 to 3, 6 to 11, 13)
  Daniel Pursey (tracks: 1, 2)
  Lee McCutcheon (track 1)
  Robin Sellars (tracks: 1 to 3, 6, 7, 11, 13)
  Steve Price (tracks: 6, 11)
- Engineer [Assistant]:
  Daniel Pursey (tracks: 1, 3, 6 to 11)
  Mat Bartram (tracks: 6, 11)
  Steve Mustarde (tracks: 6, 7, 10, 11)
- Guitar [Guitars]:
  Esbjörn Öhrwal (track 4, 5)
  Fridrik 'Frizzy' Karlsson (tracks: 1, 2, 6, 8 to 11, 13)
  Jonas Krag (track 12)
  Paul Gendler (tracks: 3, 7, 8, 10, 11)
- Keyboards:
  David Stenmarck (track 3)
  Joe Belmaati (track 12)
  Nick Jarl (track 3)
  Steve Mac (tracks: 2, 6, 7, 9, 11)
  Tue Røh* (track 12)
- Leader [String]:
  Gavin Wright (tracks: 3, 6, 8, 11)
- Mastered By:
  Bob Ludwig (tracks: 2, 6 to 9)
  Jacko (tracks: 1, 4, 5, 10 to 13)
  Tim Young (track 3)
- Mixed By:
  Bernard Löhr (tracks: 4, 5)
  Bob Clearmountain (tracks: 2, 8 to 10)
  Cutfather And Joe* (tracks: 12)
  Mads Nilson (tracks: 12)
  Stefan Glaumann (tracks: 3)
  Steve Mac (tracks: 1, 6, 7, 11, 13)
- Mixed by [Assistant]:
  Kevin Harp (tracks: 2, 8 to 10)
- Organ [Hammond]:
  Dave Arch (tracks: 2, 3, 8, 10)
- Percussion:
  Frank Ricotti (tracks: 1, 6, 8, 10, 11)
- Piano:
  Andreas Romdhane (track 5)
  Dave Arch (track 3)
  Kristoffer Nergårdh (track 5)
  Stefan Jernsthal (track 4)
  Steve Mac (tracks: 1, 2, 6, 8, 9, 11, 13)

== Charts ==
=== Weekly charts ===
Weekly chart performance for Turnaround
Chart (2003–2004)	Peak position
Austrian Albums (Ö3 Austria)	42
Belgian Albums (Ultratop Flanders)	78
Danish Albums (Hitlisten)	4
Dutch Albums (Album Top 100)	33
European Albums Chart	5
German Albums (Offizielle Top 100)	20
Irish Albums (IRMA)	1
Japanese Albums (Oricon)	35
New Zealand Albums (RMNZ)	42
Norwegian Albums (VG-lista)	37
Scottish Albums (OCC)	1
Singaporean Albums (RIAS)	3
South African Albums (RISA)	1
South Korean Albums (RIAK)	2
Swedish Albums (Sverigetopplistan)	5
Swiss Albums (Schweizer Hitparade)	24
UK Albums (Official Charts)	1

=== Year-end charts ===
2003 year-end chart performance for Turnaround
Chart (2003)	Position
Irish Albums (IRMA)	12
UK Albums (OCC)	23

2004 year-end chart performance for Turnaround
Chart (2004)	Position
UK Albums (OCC)	139

== Certifications and sales ==
Certifications for Turnaround
Region	Certification	Certified units/sales
Denmark (IFPI Danmark)	Gold	20,000^{^}
Singapore (RIAS)	Gold	5,000^{*}
South Africa (RISA)	Platinum	50,000^{*}
Sweden (GLF)	Gold	30,000^{^}
United Kingdom (BPI)	2× Platinum	752,583
Summaries
Europe (IFPI)	Platinum	1,000,000^{*}
^{*} Sales figures based on certification alone.^{^} Shipments figures based on certification alone.
