= Obvious (Westlife song) =

2004 single by Westlife

Single by Westlife

from the album Turnaround
- B-side: "I'm Missing Loving You"; "To Be with You" (live); "Westlife Hits Medley"
- Released: 23 February 2004
- Studio: Olympic (London, UK); The Location, QuizLarossi (Stockholm, Sweden)
- Length: 3:31 (LP version); 3:34 (single remix)
- Label: RCA; BMG; S
- Songwriters: Pilot; Savan Kotecha; Andreas Carlsson
- Producers: Jake Schulze; Kristian Lundin; Karl Engström

Westlife singles chronology
"Mandy" (2003)	"Obvious" (2004)	"Ain't That a Kick in the Head?" (2004)

Music video
- "Obvious" on YouTube

"Obvious" is the third and final single released from Irish boy band Westlife's fourth studio album, Turnaround (2003). The track was written by Pilot, Savan Kotecha, and Andreas Carlsson and was produced by Jake Schulze, Kristian Lundin, and Karl Engström, with additional production from Quiz & Larossi. It is composed in the traditional verse–chorus form in E major, with the group's vocals ranging from the chords of C♯_{4} to A_{5}. This was the last Westlife single to be recorded with their full original lineup, as Brian McFadden left just over three weeks after its release.

"Obvious" peaked at number three on the UK Singles Chart becoming the group's 17th consecutive top-five hit. This made Westlife the first act in the history of the chart to reach the top five with their first 17 singles, beating the record previous held by their Irish counterparts Boyzone, who had 16 consecutive top-five hits. The band originally planned to write a farewell song for McFadden, as it was his choice to leave; however, due to tour rehearsals and TV appearances, it was decided that "Obvious" would be released as a single instead. As a tribute, CD2 features a medley of McFadden's favourite Westlife songs.

== Track listings ==
UK CD1

1. "Obvious" (single remix)
2. "I'm Missing Loving You"
3. "To Be with You" (live from the Greatest Hits tour)
4. "Obvious" (video)
5. "Obvious" (making of the video)

UK CD2

1. "Obvious" (single remix)
2. "Westlife Hits Medley" ("Flying Without Wings" / "My Love" / "Mandy")

European CD single

1. "Obvious" (single remix)
2. "Lost in You"

== Charts ==
=== Weekly charts ===
Chart (2004)	Peak position
Austria (Ö3 Austria Top 40)	63
Belgium (Ultratip Bubbling Under Flanders)	15
CIS Airplay (TopHit)	132
Denmark (Tracklisten)	7
Europe (Eurochart Hot 100)	11
Germany (GfK)	39
Ireland (IRMA)	2
Netherlands (Single Top 100)	44
Poland Airplay (Polish Airplay Charts)	5
Russia Airplay (TopHit)	94
Scottish Singles Sales (Official Charts)	2
Sweden (Sverigetopplistan)	25
Switzerland (Schweizer Hitparade)	69
UK Singles (Official Charts)	3
UK Airplay (Music Week)	11
Ukraine Airplay (TopHit)	93

=== Year-end charts ===
Chart (2004)	Position
UK Singles (OCC)	82

== Release history ==
Region	Date	Format(s)	Label(s)	Ref.
United Kingdom	23 February 2004	CD	RCA; S; BMG	
Denmark	1 March 2004	CD	RCA; S; BMG	
Sweden	3 March 2004	CD	RCA; S; BMG	
