= It's a Miracle (Barry Manilow song) =

1975 single by Barry Manilow

Single by Barry Manilow

from the album Barry Manilow II
- B-side: "One of These Days" (US); "I Don't Want to Walk Without You" (UK)
- Released: February 1975
- Genre: Pop
- Length: 3:15 (single version); 3:58 (album version)
- Label: Arista
- Songwriters: Barry Manilow, Marty Panzer
- Producers: Barry Manilow, Ron Dante

Barry Manilow singles chronology
"Mandy" (1974)	"It's a Miracle" (1975)	"Could It Be Magic" (1975)

"It's a Miracle" is a 1975 single by Barry Manilow and was the second release from his album, Barry Manilow II. "It's a Miracle" went to number twelve on the U.S. Billboard Hot 100 and was Manilow's second number one on the U.S. Easy Listening chart, spending one week at number one in April 1975. The single also peaked at number fifteen on the disco/dance chart, and was the first of four entries on the chart. "It's a Miracle" was followed by "Could It Be Magic".

In Canada, "It's a Miracle" was a number one hit, spending two weeks at the top spot. It was his second and final number one song in that nation, and is ranked as the 25th biggest Canadian hit of 1975.

The song describes the rigors of a long concert tour across America. The "miracle" is coming home and rediscovering love and intimacy after having gone for a protracted time without it. Once the singer returns home, he is determined to never leave again.

Cash Box said that it's "an up-tempo, rocking tune with a great dance rhythm." Record World called it "an all-purpose disco-dynamic delight."

"It's a Miracle" is traditionally the first song played at Barry Manilow concerts. The single version of the song features riffs from a saxophone at the instrumental outro.

== Chart performance ==
=== Weekly charts ===
Chart (1975)	Peak position
Canada Top Singles (RPM)	1
Canada Adult Contemporary (RPM)	2
US Billboard Hot 100	12
US Adult Contemporary (Billboard)	1
U.S. Cash Box Top 100	10
U.S. Hot Dance/Disco (Billboard)	15

=== Year-end charts ===
Chart (1975)	Rank
Canada RPM Top Singles	25
U.S. Billboard Hot 100	123

== See also ==
- List of number-one adult contemporary singles of 1975 (U.S.)
