= The Feeling's Not Right Again =

Compilation album by Ray Stevens
- Released: June 1979
- Genre: Pop, country
- Label: Warner Bros.
- Producer: Ray Stevens

Ray Stevens chronology
Be Your Own Best Friend (1978)	The Feeling's Not Right Again (1979)	The Ray Stevens Greatest Hits Collection (1979)

The Feeling's Not Right Again is a collection of previously recorded songs by Ray Stevens, released in 1979. All of the selections were chosen from his studio albums that were recorded for Warner Bros. Records. Stevens had a total of five singles released by Warner Bros., but only three are featured on this collection; the rest of the selections are album tracks. The first track, "I Need Your Help Barry Manilow," is a novelty single that made its first album appearance on this collection; both it and the title track are homages to singer-songwriter Barry Manilow, and the album's cover art is itself a spoof of Manilow's album Tryin' to Get the Feeling. "I Need Your Help Barry Manilow" was a minor hit for Stevens, narrowly missing the top 40 of the Billboard Hot 100 (Stevens's last appearance on the chart to date) and reaching #11 on the adult contemporary music charts.

== Track listing ==
All tracks are written by Ray Stevens except where noted.

Side One
No.	Title	Writer(s)	Length
1.	"I Need Your Help Barry Manilow"	Dale Gonyea	3:44
2.	"Get Crazy With Me"		4:11
3.	"Gimme a Smile"	Toni Wine	2:47
4.	"Daydream Romance"		3:35
5.	"L'Amour"	Stevens, Gilbert Bécaud	3:37

Side Two
No.	Title	Writer(s)	Length
1.	"The Feeling's Not Right Again"	Stevens, Chuck Martin	3:31
2.	"Feel the Music"		4:02
3.	"Comeback"		4:00
4.	"OM"		4:38
5.	"Be Your Own Best Friend"		2:52

== Album credits ==
- Arranged and Produced by: Ray Stevens
- Recorded at Ray Stevens' Studio, Nashville

== Charts ==
Singles - Billboard (North America)

Year	Single	Chart	Position
1979	"I Need Your Help Barry Manilow"	Billboard Adult Contemporary	11
1979	"I Need Your Help Barry Manilow"	Cash Box Top 100	34
1979	"I Need Your Help Barry Manilow"	Billboard Hot 100	49
1979	"I Need Your Help Barry Manilow"	Canadian RPM Top Singles	63
1979	"I Need Your Help Barry Manilow"	Billboard Hot Country Singles & Tracks	85
