= Hey Whatever =

2003 single by Westlife

Single by Westlife

from the album Turnaround
- B-side: "I Won't Let You Down"; "Singing Forever"
- Released: 15 September 2003
- Studio: Rokstone, Sphere (London)
- Length: 3:30
- Label: RCA; BMG; S
- Songwriters: Ken Papenfus; Carl Papenfus; Steve Mac; Wayne Hector
- Producer: Steve Mac

Westlife singles chronology
"Tonight" / "Miss You Nights" (2003)	"Hey Whatever" (2003)	"Mandy" (2003)

Music video
- "Hey Whatever" on YouTube

"Hey Whatever" is a song by Irish boy band Westlife. It was released on 15 September 2003 as the lead single from their fourth studio album, Turnaround (2003). The song is a re-written version of "Rainbow Zephyr", a popular song by Northern Irish rock band Relish. Released on 15 September 2003, the song peaked at number four on the UK Singles Chart.

In Westlife - Our Story, the band said they pushed for "Hey Whatever" to be released as the lead single despite Simon Cowell telling them they did not have a hit. The song became one of Westlife's lowest-charting singles and was their first not to sell more than 100,000 copies at the time, selling just under 80,000.

== Track listings ==
UK CD1

1. "Hey Whatever"
2. "I Won't Let You Down"
3. "Hey Whatever" (video)

UK CD2

1. "Hey Whatever"
2. "Singing Forever"
3. "Tonight" (Metro Mix video)
4. "The Making of the Video" (video)

UK cassette single and European CD single

1. "Hey Whatever" – 3:28
2. "I Won't Let You Down" – 3:45

== Charts ==
=== Weekly charts ===
Chart (2003)	Peak position
Austria (Ö3 Austria Top 40)	48
Belgium (Ultratip Bubbling Under Flanders)	6
CIS Airplay (TopHit)	51
Denmark (Tracklisten)	2
Europe (European Hot 100 Singles)	13
Germany (GfK)	22
Ireland (IRMA)	2
Latvia (Latvijas Top 40)	27
Netherlands (Single Top 100)	30
New Zealand (Recorded Music NZ)	39
Poland Airplay (Polish Airplay Charts)	22
Romania (Romanian Top 100)	61
Russia Airplay (TopHit)	42
Scottish Singles Sales (Official Charts)	3
Sweden (Sverigetopplistan)	5
Switzerland (Schweizer Hitparade)	53
UK Singles (Official Charts)	4
UK Airplay (Music Week)	11

=== Year-end charts ===
Chart (2003)	Position
CIS (TopHit)	101
Ireland (IRMA)	23
Russia Airplay (TopHit)	85
Sweden (Hitlistan)	88
UK Singles (OCC)	89

== Release history ==
Region	Date	Format(s)	Label(s)	Ref.
United Kingdom	15 September 2003	CD	RCA; BMG; S	
Sweden	1 October 2003	CD	RCA; BMG; S	
