= Try Me, I Know We Can Make It =

- U.S. 7-inch vinyl single

Single by Donna Summer

from the album A Love Trilogy
- B-side: "Wasted"
- Released: March 30, 1976
- Recorded: 1975
- Studio: Musicland Studios (Munich, Germany)
- Genre: Disco
- Length: 4:14 (single version); 17:57 (Full-length version)
- Label: Oasis (United States); Atlantic (France/Germany); Groovy (The Netherlands); Durium (Italy); Ariola (Spain)
- Songwriters: Giorgio Moroder; Pete Bellotte; Donna Summer
- Producers: Giorgio Moroder; Pete Bellotte

Donna Summer singles chronology
"Could It Be Magic" (1976)	"Try Me, I Know We Can Make It" (1976)	"Spring Affair" (1976)

"Try Me, I Know We Can Make It" is a song by American singer Donna Summer from her third studio album A Love Trilogy (1976).

== Background ==
Donna Summer's breakthrough had come in the form of the disco song "Love to Love You Baby" which in its entirety lasted almost seventeen minutes and took up the entire first side of the 1975 album of the same name. Due to its success (and also its success as a 12-inch single) the format was repeated with the next album and with this song which was longer than "Love to Love You Baby", clocking in at eighteen minutes. Edited versions were also released on the 7-inch single format.

== Track listing ==
1. "Try Me, I Know We Can Make It" (4:14)
2. "Wasted" (3:58)

== Charts ==
"Try Me, I Know We Can Make It" peaked at number 80 on the US Billboard Hot 100 and number 35 on the R&B singles chart. It was more popular in nightclubs, however, becoming Summer's second number-one single on the Dance Club Songs chart in May 1976 and remaining atop that chart for three weeks. It also peaked at number six in Spain singles charts and number 22 in Spain Radio chart.

=== Weekly charts ===
Chart (1976)	Peak position
Canada Top Singles (RPM)	68
Germany (GfK)	42
Italy (Musica e dischi)	12
Mexico (Radio Mil)	12
Portugal (Musica & Som)	12
Spain (Promusicae)	6
US Billboard Hot 100	80
US Dance Club Songs (Billboard)	1
US Hot R&B/Hip-Hop Songs (Billboard)	35

=== Certifications ===
Region	Certification	Certified units/sales
Philippines	Gold	60,000

== See also ==
- List of number-one dance hits (United States)
