= Be Your Own Best Friend =

Studio album by Ray Stevens
- Released: October 1978
- Genre: Pop; country
- Label: Warner Bros.
- Producer: Ray Stevens

Ray Stevens chronology
There Is Something on Your Mind (1977)	Be Your Own Best Friend (1978)	The Feeling's Not Right Again (1979)

Be Your Own Best Friend is the sixteenth studio album by Ray Stevens as well as his fourth and final for Warner Bros. Records, released in 1978. The third track, "You've Got the Music Inside", is a re-recording of a track that was from Stevens' 1973 album Nashville.

All of the selections were published by Ray Stevens Music-BMI, with the exception of "You've Got the Music Inside," which was published by Ahab Music Company, Inc.-BMI.

The title track is the album's sole single.

== Track listing ==
Side one
No.	Title	Writer(s)	Length
1.	"L'Amour"	Ray Stevens, Gilbert Bécaud	3:38
2.	"Two Wrongs Don't Make a Right"	Ray Stevens	4:21
3.	"You've Got the Music Inside"	Ray Stevens	4:13
4.	"Hidin' Place"	Ray Stevens	2:58

Side two
No.	Title	Writer(s)	Length
1.	"Be Your Own Best Friend"	Ray Stevens	2:52
2.	"The Feeling's Not Right Again"	Ray Stevens, Chuck Martin	3:31
3.	"Comeback"	Ray Stevens	4:06
4.	"You're Magic"	Layng Martine, Jr.	2:21
5.	"With a Smile"	Ray Stevens	3:12

== Personnel ==
- Ray Stevens - keyboards, synthesizer, percussion
- Jerry Kroon - drums
- Jack Williams - bass
- Chet Atkins, Steve Gibson - electric guitar
- Mark Casstevens - acoustic guitar
- Lisa Silver, Sheri Kramer, Diane Tidwell - backing vocals
- Shelly Kurland Strings - strings
- Ray Stevens, Denis Solee - horns

Technical

- Stuart Keathley - recording engineer
- Charlie Tallent, Ray Stevens - mixing
- Ray Stevens - production, arrangements
- Recorded at Ray Stevens' Studio - Nashville
- Ed Thrasher - photography
- Brad Kanawyer - design

== Charts ==
Singles - Billboard (North America)

Year	Single	Chart	Position
1978	"Be Your Own Best Friend"	Canadian RPM Country Tracks	16
1978	"Be Your Own Best Friend"	Billboard Hot Country Singles & Tracks	36
1978	"Be Your Own Best Friend"	Billboard Adult Contemporary	50
