= A Love Trilogy =

Studio album by Donna Summer
- Released: March 5, 1976
- Recorded: August–December 1975
- Studios: Musicland, Munich
- Genre: Disco
- Length: 33:49
- Labels: Casablanca; Oasis
- Producers: Giorgio Moroder, Pete Bellotte

Donna Summer chronology
| Love to Love You Baby (1975) | A Love Trilogy (1976) | Four Seasons of Love (1976) |

Singles from A Love Trilogy
- 1. "Could It Be Magic" Released: January 11, 1976; 2. "Try Me, I Know We Can Make It" Released: March 30, 1976

Professional ratings
Review scores
| Source | Rating |
|---|---|
| AllMusic | 3/5 stars |
| Christgau's Record Guide | B |
| The Rolling Stone Album Guide | 2/5 stars |

A Love Trilogy is the third studio album by American singer and songwriter Donna Summer. It was released on March 5, 1976, eight months after her international breakthrough with the single and album of the same name – "Love to Love You Baby". The bold, sexual nature of that particular song had earned Summer the title 'the first lady of love'. By now Summer's work was being distributed in the U.S. by Casablanca Records, and the label encouraged Summer, Moroder and team to continue in this vein. A Love Trilogy uses the first side for one long disco track in three distinct movements 'Try Me', 'I Know', 'We Can Make It', and coalescing into the "love trilogy" of the title – "Try Me, I Know We Can Make It". Side two contained three additional erotic disco songs, including a cover of Barry Manilow's "Could It Be Magic". The album's artwork showed Summer floating light-heartedly through the clouds, again adding to the image of her as a fantasy figure.

The album sold well across the world (it was her second consecutive album to be certified Gold in the United States) and again topped the national US Disco charts. Edited versions of "Try Me, I Know We Can Make It" and "Could It Be Magic" did not reach the top forty on the Billboard Hot 100, but the latter was a sizable R&B hit (#21) and disco hit (#3). Casablanca released a 12-inch version of "Try Me I Know We Can Make It" with "Love to Love You Baby" on the reverse side. The single "Could It Be Magic" was a Top 5 hit in the Netherlands.

The album reached the no. 41 spot in September, six months after its initial release. Likewise the single "Could It Be Magic" which only reached no. 40.

== Track listing ==
All tracks produced by Pete Bellotte and Giorgio Moroder.

Side one
| No. | Title | Writer(s) | Length |
|---|---|---|---|
| 1. | "Try Me, I Know We Can Make It" | Donna Summer; Bellotte; Moroder | 17:57 |

Side two
| No. | Title | Writer(s) | Length |
|---|---|---|---|
| 1. | "Prelude to Love" | Summer; Bellotte; Moroder | 1:06 |
| 2. | "Could It Be Magic" | Adrienne Anderson; Barry Manilow | 5:19 |
| 3. | "Wasted" | Bellotte; Moroder | 5:09 |
| 4. | "Come With Me" | Bellotte; Moroder | 4:22 |

== Personnel ==
- Donna Summer – vocals
- Giorgio Moroder – synthesizer, bass guitar, producer
- Pete Bellotte – producer
- The Midnite Ladies: Madeline Bell, Sunny Leslie, Sue Glover – backing vocals
- The Munich Machine: Thor Baldursson – keyboards, string arrangement, Frank Diez – guitar, Keith Forsey – drums, Martin Harrison – drums, Molly Moll – guitar, Gary Unwin – bass guitar, Les Hurdle – bass guitar

The musicians collectively known as the "Munich Machine" worked on a variety of Moroder/Bellotte productions from this period.

Production

- Producers: Giorgio Moroder, Pete Bellotte
- Engineer: Jürgen Koppers, Mack & Hans
- Musical arrangements: Giorgio Moroder and Thor Baldurson

== Charts ==
Chart performance for A Love Trilogy
| Chart (1976) | Peak position |
|---|---|
| Australian Albums (Kent Music Report) | 32 |
| Austrian Albums (Ö3 Austria) | 8 |
| Finnish Albums (Suomen virallinen lista) | 14 |
| French Albums (SNEP) | 4 |
| German Albums (Offizielle Top 100) | 24 |
| Italian Albums (Musica e dischi) | 4 |
| Norwegian Albums (VG-lista) | 14 |
| Portuguese Albums (Musica & Som) | 4 |
| Spanish Albums (AFE) | 1 |
| Swedish Albums (Sverigetopplistan) | 18 |
| UK Albums (Official Charts) | 41 |
| US Billboard 200 | 21 |

== Certifications ==
| Region | Certification | Certified units/sales |
|---|---|---|
| France (SNEP) | Gold | 100,000^{*} |
| Philippines (PARI) | Platinum | 60,000 |
| United Kingdom (BPI) | Gold | 100,000^{^} |
| United States (RIAA) | Gold | 500,000^{^} |
^{*} Sales figures based on certification alone.^{^} Shipments figures based on certification alone.
