= Barry Manilow II =

Studio album by Barry Manilow
- Released: October 1, 1974; 1996 (re-release); 2006 (re-release)
- Studio: Hit Factory, New York City; Mediasound, New York City
- Genre: Pop; soft rock; easy listening
- Length: 38:14 (original release); 41:37 (1996 re-release); 44:23 (2006 re-release)
- Label: Bell; Arista (Re-release)
- Producer: Barry Manilow, Ron Dante

Barry Manilow chronology
Barry Manilow (1973)	Barry Manilow II (1974)	Tryin' to Get the Feeling (1975)

Singles from Barry Manilow II
- 1. "Mandy"/"Something's Comin' Up" Released: October 7, 1974; 2. "It's a Miracle" Released: 1975

Professional ratings
Review scores
Source	Rating
Allmusic	link
Christgau's Record Guide	C
Rolling Stone	(unfavorable) link

Barry Manilow II is the second studio album by Barry Manilow released in 1974. Propelled by the major success of its lead single "Mandy" and featuring a further international hit in "It's a Miracle", the album was a commercial breakthrough for Manilow. First issued by Bell Records, it was reissued after the company was reorganized into Arista Records. The album's success spawned a notable parody in the picture sleeve of Ray Stevens' 1979 single, "I Need Your Help Barry Manilow".

Album peaked at #29 on Canada's RPM Album Chart.

== Track listing ==
=== Side 1 ===
1. "I Want To Be Somebody's Baby" (Barry Manilow, Enoch Anderson) - 4:18
2. "Early Morning Strangers" (Barry Manilow, Hal David) - 3:24
3. "Mandy" (Scott English, Richard Kerr) - 3:32
4. "The Two of Us" (Barry Manilow, Marty Panzer) - 3:05
5. "Something's Comin' Up" (Barry Manilow) - 2:51

=== Side 2 ===
1. "It's a Miracle" (Barry Manilow, Marty Panzer) - 3:58
2. "Avenue C" (Buck Clayton, Jon Hendricks, Dave Lambert) - 2:37
3. "My Baby Loves Me" (Ivy Hunter, Sylvia Moy, William "Mickey" Stevenson) - 3:18
4. "Sandra" (Barry Manilow, Enoch Anderson) - 4:35
5. "Home Again" (Barry Manilow, Marty Panzer) - 5:34

=== 1996 Remaster ===
1. "I Want To Be Somebody's Baby"
2. "Early Morning Strangers"
3. "Mandy"
4. "The Two of Us"
5. "Something's Comin' Up"
6. "It's a Miracle"
7. "Avenue C"
8. "My Baby Loves Me"
9. "Sandra"
10. "Home Again"

Bonus track:

1. "Halfway Over the Hill"

=== 2006 Expanded Edition ===
1. "I Want To Be Somebody's Baby"
2. "Early Morning Strangers"
3. "Mandy"
4. "The Two of Us"
5. "Something's Comin' Up"
6. "It's a Miracle"
7. "Avenue C"
8. "My Baby Loves Me"
9. "Sandra"
10. "Home Again"

Bonus tracks:

1. "Good News"
2. "Halfway Over the Hill"

== Charts ==
Chart (1974/75)	Position
United States (Billboard 200)	9
Australia (Kent Music Report)	66

== Personnel ==
- Barry Manilow - lead vocals, backing vocals, rhythm arrangements, acoustic piano (1–6, 9, 10)
- Don Grolnick - acoustic piano (7)
- Ellen Starr - acoustic piano (8)
- Jon Stroll - clavinet (1), electric piano (2–6, 8, 9, 10)
- John Barranco - guitar (1, 6)
- Dick Frank - guitar (1, 6, 8, 9, 10)
- Bob Mann - guitar (1, 6, 10)
- Charlie Brown - guitar (2, 3, 10)
- Stuart Scharf - guitar (2, 4, 5, 8, 9, 10)
- Sam T. Brown - guitar (7)
- Will Lee - bass guitar (1, 2, 3, 5, 6)
- Russell George - bass guitar (4, 8, 9, 10)
- Bob Cranshaw - bass guitar (7)
- Chris Parker - drums (1, 6)
- Jimmy Young - drums (2, 3, 5)
- Bill Lavorgna - drums (7)
- Allan Schwartzberg - drums (8, 9, 10)
- Lee Gurst - percussion (1, 6)
- Norman Pride - congas (1, 2, 5–8, 10)
- George Young - saxophone (2)
- Artie Kaplan - saxophone (6)
- Stanley Schwartz: saxophone (6)
- Jack Cortner - horn and string arrangements
- Ron Dante - backing vocals
- Melvin Kent - backing vocals (1)
- Ken Williams - backing vocals (1)
- Charlotte Crossley - backing vocals (6)
- Robin Grean - backing vocals (6)
- Sharon Redd - backing vocals (6)

=== Production ===
- Producers: Barry Manilow and Ron Dante
- Engineers: Bruce Tergesen, Harry Maslin and Michael DeLugg
- Recorded at The Hit Factory and Mediasound Recording Studios (New York City)
- Design: The Music Agency
- Front Cover Photo: Joel Brodsky
- Back Liner Photo: Linda Allen

== Certifications ==
Region	Certification	Certified units/sales
United States (RIAA)	Platinum	1,000,000^{^}
^{^} Shipments figures based on certification alone.
