= Barry Manilow (1973 album) =

- Original 1973 cover art

Studio album by Barry Manilow
- Released: July 1973
- Studios: A & R, New York City; Associated Recording, New York City
- Genres: Pop; easy listening; soft rock
- Length: 36:20
- Labels: Bell; Arista (re-release)
- Producers: Barry Manilow, Ron Dante

Barry Manilow chronology
Barry Manilow (1973)	Barry Manilow II (1974)

1975 reissue cover
- 1975 Reissue retitled Barry Manilow I

Singles from Barry Manilow I
- 1. "Could It Be Magic" Released: 1975

Professional ratings
Review scores
Source	Rating
Allmusic	3.5/5 stars
Rolling Stone	(unfavorable)

Barry Manilow is the debut album by Barry Manilow, released initially in 1973 by Bell Records.

The original release was unsuccessful, with only around 35,000 copies sold by 1975. After the success of Manilow's second album Barry Manilow II, the album was re-released as Barry Manilow I in 1975 by Arista - the label that took over Bell Records' roster of artists. Four songs of the original album were reworked for this version, including "Could It Be Magic" which served as the single for the re-release. The re-released album was certified gold by the RIAA in 1976 for over half a million copies sold.

Record World called the single "Sweet Water Jones" an "Elton John-ish number...about splitting the city for country."

== Track listing ==
All tracks composed by Barry Manilow; except where indicated.

=== Original 1973 release ===
Issued on Bell Records as Barry Manilow. To commemorate the 50th anniversary of its original release, this version was remastered and reissued for the first time in 2023.

Side 1

1. "Sing It" - 1:16
2. "Sweetwater Jones" - 2:29
3. "Cloudburst" (Jimmy Harris, Jon Hendricks, Leroy Kirkland) - 2:25
4. "One of These Days" - 2:54
5. "Oh My Lady" (Manilow, Adrienne Anderson) - 3:26
6. "I Am Your Child" (Manilow, Marty Panzer) - 2:14

Side 2

1. "Could It Be Magic" (inspired by Prelude in C Minor, Frédéric Chopin; Manilow, Adrienne Anderson) - 7:11
2. "Seven More Years" (Manilow, Marty Panzer) - 3:35
3. "Flashy Lady" (Marty Panzer, Ron Dante) - 3:57
4. "Friends" (Buzzy Linhart, Mark Klingman) - 3:05
5. "Sweet Life" - 3:14

=== 1975 reissue ===
Issued on Arista Records as Barry Manilow I, with the songs "Sweet Life", "Could It Be Magic", "One of These Days", and "Oh My Lady" re-recorded at Mediasound Studios in April 1975. This version was remastered and re-released by Arista Records again in 1988 for CD and cassette tape. The album peaked at #64 on Canada's RPM Album Chart.

Side 1

1. "Sing It" - 1:16
2. "Sweetwater Jones" - 2:31
3. "Cloudburst" - 2:25
4. "One of these Days" - 2:50
5. "Oh My Lady" - 3:28
6. "I Am Your Child" - 2:14

Side 2

1. "Could It Be Magic" - 6:50
2. "Seven More Years" - 3:35
3. "Flashy Lady" - 3:53
4. "Friends" - 3:05
5. "Sweet Life" - 3:47

=== 2006 remaster ===
Remastered CD reissue by Arista, with Bell label on disc, with bonus tracks and original 1973 cover art.

1. "Sing It"
2. "Sweetwater Jones"
3. "Cloudburst"
4. "One of these Days"
5. "Oh My Lady"
6. "I Am Your Child"
7. "Could It Be Magic"
8. "Seven More Years"
9. "Flashy Lady"
10. "Friends"
11. "Sweet Life"

Bonus tracks

12. "Caroline" (Manilow, Anderson)
13. "Rosalie Rosie" (Manilow, Anderson)
14. "Star Children"
15. "Let's Take Some Time to Say Goodbye" (Arthur Schroeck)

== Personnel ==
- Barry Manilow - vocals, piano, arrangements, conductor
- Dick Frank - electric guitar
- Stuart Scharf - acoustic guitar
- Stu Woods - bass
- Steve Gadd - drums
- Norman Pride - congas, tambourine

with:

- Russell George - bass on "Sweetwater Jones", "I am Your Child" and "Sweet Life"
- Bob Babbitt - bass on "Flashy Lady"
- Bob Mann, Ron Dante - guitar on "Flashy Lady"
- Andrew Smith - drums on "Flashy Lady"
- Jimmy Maelen - percussion on "Flashy Lady"
- Joseph "Grandpa Joe" Manilow - vocals on "Sing It"
- Gail Kantor, Melissa Manchester, Merle Miller, Ron Dante, Adrienne Anderson, Jane Scheckter, Jane Stuart, Kathe Green, Laurel Massé, Pamela Pentony, Robert Danz, Sheilah Rae - backing vocals

Technical

- Elliot Scheiner - recording, mixing
- Jerome Gasper - recording on "Sweetwater Jones", "I am Your Child" and "Sweet Life"
- Artie Friedman - remixing on "Sweetwater Jones"
- Beverly Weinstein - art direction
- Ken Duncan - cover photography

== Chart positions ==
Billboard Albums

- 1975: Barry Manilow I - Billboard 200 No. 28

Billboard Singles

- 1975: "Could It Be Magic" - Adult Contemporary No. 4
- 1975: "Could It Be Magic" - Billboard Hot 100 No. 6

== Certifications ==
Region	Certification	Certified units/sales
United States (RIAA)	Gold	500,000^{^}
^{^} Shipments figures based on certification alone.
