= Relish (band) =

Northern Irish rock band

- Origin: Downpatrick, Northern Ireland
- Genres: Pop, rock, soul, Alternative
- Years active: 1995–present
- Labels: EMI, CCRE Entertainment, Rock Ridge Music, Zephyr Sounds, Universal Music
- Members: Kenneth Papenfus; Carl Papenfus
- Past members: Darren Campbell
- Website: relishmusic.com

Relish are a rock band from Northern Ireland composed of brothers Ken (vocals and guitar) and Carl (drums, keyboards and vocals) Papenfus, and until 2013 Darren Campbell (bass and vocals). They have released three albums: 2001's "Wildflowers" (Platinum), "Karma Calling" (Gold) in 2003 (both of these were on the EMI Ireland label), and "Connected" in 2011. "Wildflowers | Karma Calling was released as a double album package by Universal Records (Ireland) in 2015.

The band are perhaps best known for the songs "Rainbow Zephyr" and "You I'm Thinking Of", from their debut album, Wildflowers. The former (a big Irish radio hit in its own right) was covered by Westlife with slightly changed lyrics and released as a single "Hey Whatever", which went on to become an international hit.

Relish were fully formed by the mid-1990s when bass player Darren Campbell teamed up with the brothers. The band signed to EMI in 1998 and immediately caught the attention of famed producer John Leckie (The Stone Roses, Radiohead).

Fans of the band include Brian May of Queen and Larry Mullen Jr of U2.

== History ==
=== Upbringing ===
The Papenfus brothers are sons of South African jazz singer Jane Londis (of Golden City Dixies fame) and doctor of psychology, author and percussionist Stan Papenfus. Their parents fled South Africa whose apartheid system deemed their inter-racial marriage illegal and settled in Belfast, Northern Ireland in the early 1970s. The Papenfus' sons early musical upbringing was augmented by their parents record collection of jazz, gospel + world music and 1960s rock; their only possession brought from South Africa.

=== Early bands and Relish formation ===
Pre-Relish musical outfits included 50/50 (half cover versions/half original) with Steafán Hanvey and grunge + funk metal band The Id. Darren Campbell joined the band, and The Id became Relish after the departure of keyboard player and vocalist Brendan Kelly. Reduced to a 3-piece outfit, all members took up vocal duties with Ken reluctantly assuming lead vocals. After three years of consistent demoing, gigging and building relationships with labels, one demo struck a chord that had record labels visiting the Relish rehearsal room in their home town of Downpatrick.

== Releases ==
=== EMI years ===
==== Wildflowers ====
Following a series of auditions in the Papenfus' living room in front of a bemused number of record company A&R personnel, the band signed to EMI Ireland in 1998 and began work on their debut album "Wildflowers" with acclaimed producer John Leckie ( Stone Roses, Radiohead), in UK studios Rockfield, Air and Abbey Road Studios. Al Clay (Stereophonics, Pixies) was commissioned to produce and mix the next phase of recording at BJG and Windmill Lane studios in Ireland. The 2001 release debuted at No 6 in the Irish charts and was well received in both the UK and Ireland. It spawned a top 10 and two top 30 singles, and a No1 in the airplay charts in Japan with "You I'm Thinking Of" The album, and particularly its lead singles, "Let It Fly" and "Rainbow Zephyr", brimmed over with direct soul and gospel influences, soft in tone but with a clear rock edge.

==== Karma Calling ====
Karma Calling was released in 2003 debuting at No. 8 in the Irish charts. Produced by Al Clay it achieved a No11 Irish hit single with 'Father, Brother, Lover and Son. During this period live slots included appearances at Scotland's T in the Park, the V Festival, Japan's Summer Sonic Festival, and by personal invitation by U2's Larry Mullen Jr. at Ireland's Slane Castle.

=== Post EMI years ===
==== Connected ====
On 19 November 2010 Relish performed their first live gig in five years. It was a charity fund raiser for Brendan Kelly, former band member and ex lead vocalist of The Id. In October 2011 a new album called "Connected" received a low key UK + Ireland release on their own label Zephyr Sounds licensed to US label Rock Ridge Music/ADA Warners (which included radio hits "Something To Believe In", "Connected" and "Together You") to positive reviews. Written, recorded, engineered, produced and mixed (almost entirely) by the Papenfus brothers, it was a heavily revised version of "Three Times"; a Japanese only release through CCRE Entertainment in 2009.

==== Wildflowers | Karma Calling ====
Wildflowers | Karma Calling was released as a double album package in Ireland only by Universal Records (Ireland) in 2015. It was released with the inclusion of the bonus track and hit single "Got It Made".

== Side projects ==
=== Session work ===
==== Andrew Strong ====
Carl Papenfus appeared on drums with Andrew Strong at Rockpalast, Bonn in 1995

==== Players ====
After parting ways with EMI in 2005, Relish took a hiatus with individual members enjoying other musical projects, most notably the Papenfus brothers collaboration with Damon Minchella (Ocean Colour Scene), Steve White, (Paul Weller), Mick Talbot (Style Council) in "supergroup" The Players album "From the Six Corners" (2005) supported by a European tour including an appearance at the Glastonbury Festival.

===== Juno Falls (V2), Paul Brady, Lesley Roy (Jive), Hal, The Answer, Steafan Hanvey =====
Carl appeared as drummer on several projects including "Weightless" (2005) by Juno Falls (V2), "The Paul Brady Songbook" (2002) by Paul Brady, "Unbeautiful" by Lesley Roy (Jive) in 2008, "The Time The Hour" (2012) by Hal, "Nuclear Family" (2013) and "Honeymoon Junkies" (2006) by Steafán Hanvey and toured Europe with The Answer filling in for injured drummer James Heatley on a leg of their support tour with AC/DC documented on the accompanying DVD of their live album "412 Days of Rock 'n’ Roll." (2011)

===== Paul Weller, Julian Joseph =====
Ken guested on guitar with Paul Weller live and on television and is featured on the live dvd "Studio 150 (2004)" by Paul Weller whilst also appearing on the aforementioned Steafán Hanvey albums. Ken also took the lead role in Julian Joseph's jazz opera Tristan and Isolde that was premiered in London's Royal Opera House.

===== Sing Street (musical/soundtrack) =====
During 2014/15, Ken and Carl Papenfus co-wrote and performed as guitarist and drummer respectively on the soundtrack of the John Carney movie Sing Street, which was later nominated for a Golden Globe on release in 2017 and to be performed as a stage version on Broadway

Sinéad O'Connor

During 2014 and 2015, Ken and Carl Papenfus performed as guitarist and drummer respectively in Sinéad O'Connor's band extensively touring Europe, the USA, Australia and South America and later in 2015 produced and performed her cover version of Blind Willie Johnson's classic "Trouble Soon Be Over" for the album "The Songs of Blind Willie Johnson" which received two Grammy nominations.

The Late Late Show

Ken and Carl Papenfus have been members of the house band for Ireland's premier live entertainment programme and second longest running late night talk show in the world - The Late Late Show since 2021.

=== 67 Management ===
The Papenfus brothers went on to form a music management company, 67 Management, managing Sinéad O'Connor who they've represented since early 2019

=== Production ===
The Answer, Marilyn Bane, Sinéad O'Connor, Grainne Duffy

The Papenfus brothers first collaboration with The Answer was in producing their first effort Breakdown Honey (2002). Ken and Carl Papenfus wrote and produced several songs for Marilyn Bane, runner up in Ireland's talent show "You're a Star" (Irish X Factor) in 2007. For Sinéad O'Connor, Kenny and Carl Papenfus produced and solely performed the cover version of Blind Willie Johnson's classic "Trouble Soon Be Over" for the Grammy nominated album "The Songs of Blind Willie Johnson" also featuring Tom Waits, Blind Boys of Alabama et al. Also, Ken and Carl have produced several more songs for Sinéad O'Connor: the 2020 Van Morrison cover of "Who Was That Masked Man" for Hot Press magazine's celebration of his 75th birthday, "I'll Be Singing" for the soundtrack of the film "Wild Mountain Thyme" nominated for a Hollywood Music in Media Award and with Bear McReary produced the theme for the popular Netflix series "Outlander" (Season 7), sung by Sinéad O'Connor released Summer 2023. Ken and Carl produced and performed on "Shine" by Grainne Duffy.

=== Zephyr Sounds / High Altitude Recordings ===
In 2013, the distribution end of the Zephyr Sounds label was opened to facilitate artists and labels globally through Ingrooves|Fontana. Relish released their first single of 2015 "Got It Made" on the Zephyr Sounds imprint via Universal Records (Ireland) which also appears as a bonus track on the re-release, double package "Wildflowers | Karma Calling". The company changed its name to High Altitude Recordings in 2016.

== Awards ==
Relish received "Best New Hope" at the Irish IRMA Awards in 2001

== Discography ==
- "Wildflowers" (2001)
- "Karma Calling" (2003)
- "Three Times" (Japan only) (2009)
- "Connected" (2011)
- "Wildflowers | Karma Calling" (2015)
