= Ray Stevens =

American country and pop musician (born 1939)

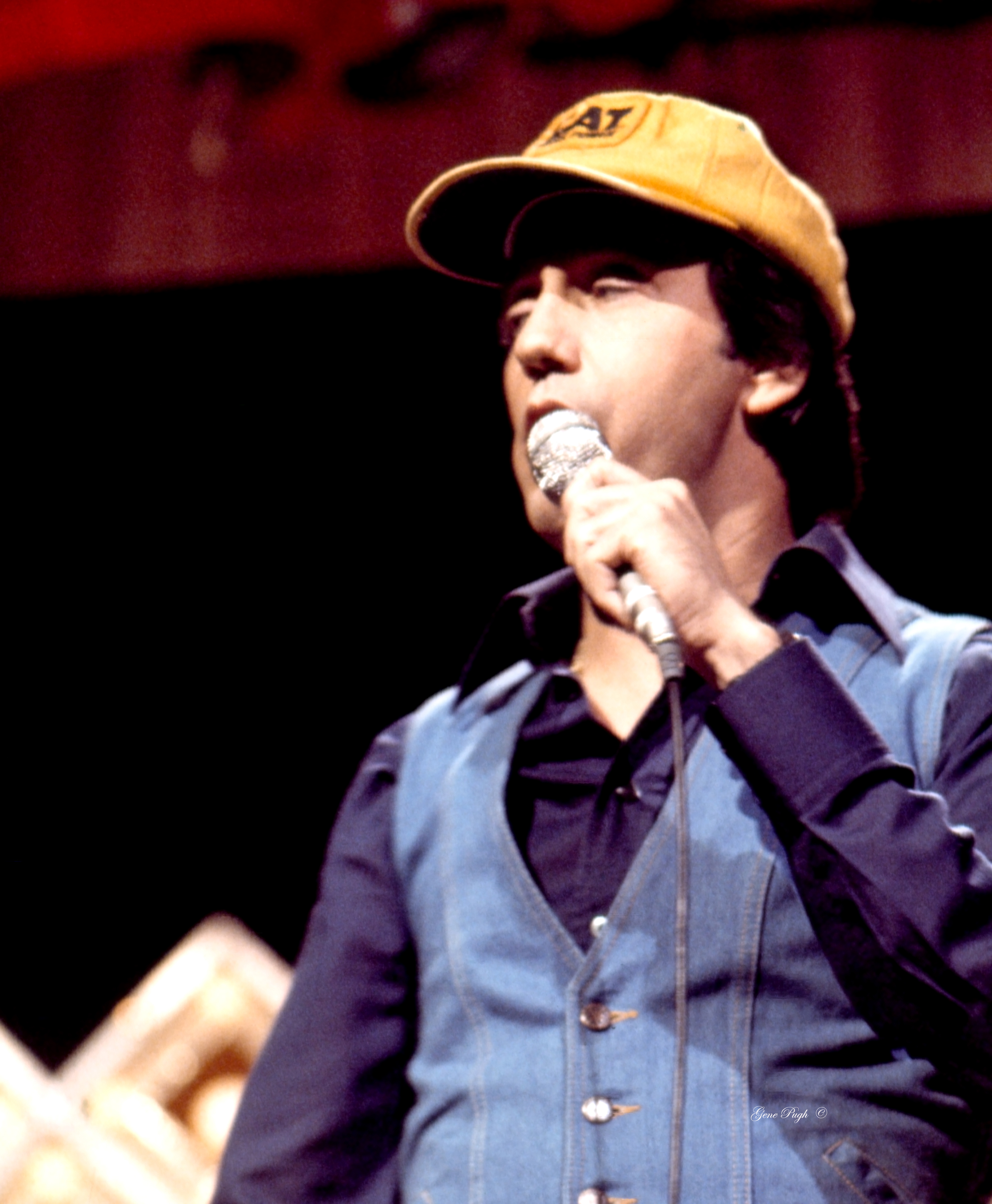
- Stevens on The Johnny Cash Show, between 1969 and 1971

Background information
- Born: Harold Ray Ragsdale; January 24, 1939 (age 87); Clarkdale, Georgia, U.S.
- Genres: Country; pop; gospel; novelty; comedy
- Occupations: Singer-songwriter; arranger; comedian
- Instruments: Vocals; keyboards; trumpet
- Years active: 1957–present
- Labels: NRC; Mercury; Monument; Barnaby; Warner Bros.; RCA; MCA; Curb; CBS; Janus
- Spouse: Penny Jackson (m. 1961; died 2021)

Harold Ray Ragsdale (born January 24, 1939), known professionally as Ray Stevens, is an American country singer-songwriter and comedian. He is best known for his Grammy-winning recordings "Everything Is Beautiful" and "Misty", as well as novelty hits including "Ahab the Arab", "Gitarzan" and "The Streak". Stevens has earned gold albums and has worked as a producer, music arranger, and television host. He was also inducted into the Nashville Songwriters Hall of Fame, the Georgia Music Hall of Fame, the Christian Music Hall of Fame, and the Country Music Hall of Fame and Museum.

== Early life ==
Harold Ray Ragsdale was born on January 24, 1939, in Clarkdale, Georgia. He is the elder of two sons born to Willis Harold Ragsdale (1915–2001) and Frances Stephens Ragsdale (1916–1997). His younger brother, John, who died in 2020 at the age of 75, became an actor and writer.

While attending high school, Stevens formed his first band, a rhythm and blues group named The Barons. He began studying business administration at Georgia State College in Atlanta, but quickly switched his major to music. Stevens left after completing three of the four years required to obtain a degree, which he felt he did not need.

== Career ==
=== Early career ===
At age 18, Stevens signed to Capitol Records' Prep Records division in 1957 and produced the single "Silver Bracelet", with a cover of "Rang Tang Ding Dong" (originally recorded by doo-wop group The Cellos in 1956) as the B-side. The single received a positive review from Billboard.

According to the Country Music Hall of Fame, "In between the record's 1957 recording and its release, his name was changed to 'Ray Stevens' at the insistence of country A&R chief Ken Nelson of Capitol Records, who said 'Ray Ragsdale' didn't 'pop.'"

=== 1960s ===
Stevens signed with Mercury Records in 1961. His first hit came that year, with the novelty song "Jeremiah Peabody's Polyunsaturated Quick-Dissolving Fast-Acting Pleasant-Tasting Green and Purple Pills," which hit #35 on the pop chart. This began the long string of novelty songs for which Stevens is best known, including "Ahab the Arab" (#5, 1962), "Harry the Hairy Ape" (#17, 1963) and "Gitarzan" (#8, 1969).

Based in Nashville since 1962, Stevens also worked as a multi-instrumental session musician and songwriter. According to the Country Music Hall of Fame, "Stevens became a favorite of maestro Chet Atkins. He sang with the Jordanaires; played trumpet for an Elvis Presley session; wrote songs for Brook Benton, Skeeter Davis, and Dolly Parton; and contributed to Waylon Jennings's classic 'Only Daddy That'll Walk the Line.'"

While Stevens was best known for comedy, he occasionally recorded straightforward pop songs as well. The most successful of these in the 1960s was "Mr. Businessman," which went to #28 on the Billboard Hot 100 in 1968.

=== 1970s ===
In 1970, Stevens signed to Barnaby Records, owned by singer Andy Williams. He then hosted an NBC comedy-variety series, Andy Williams Presents Ray Stevens, as a summer replacement for Williams' regular series. This led to Stevens' biggest hit in the U.S., his gospel-inflected single "Everything Is Beautiful" (1970), which he wrote and performed as the theme song for his TV show. It won a Grammy Award, was a number-one hit on both the pop and adult contemporary charts, and marked his first time in the top 40 on the country charts, peaking at number 39. The single sold over one million copies earning a gold record.

Stevens had a transatlantic chart-topping hit in 1974 with "The Streak", a novelty song about streaking which reached number one on the American and British singles charts. The following year, he scored another hit with a unique arrangement of Erroll Garner's jazz-pop standard "Misty," which went to #3 on the country chart and #14 on the Hot 100.

Through the late 1970s and early 1980s, with some exceptions (such as "Shriner's Convention" in 1981), Stevens focused mostly on serious material, as he felt that the novelty song was becoming less popular in the era. However, in 1977 he released a cover version of Glenn Miller's big-band standard "In the Mood" in which the vocals sounded like chickens clucking, credited to The Henhouse Five Plus Too. Stevens also had an adult contemporary crossover hit in 1979 with "I Need Your Help Barry Manilow", a cut from Stevens' Barry Manilow tribute/parody album The Feeling's Not Right Again.

=== 1980s ===
Stevens signed with RCA Records in 1980, releasing three albums over the next two years. He briefly returned to Mercury Records for one album in 1983. Convinced that novelty songs were becoming popular again, he authorized the rush release of "Mississippi Squirrel Revival" for MCA Records in 1984, which reached the country top 20. In 1985, Stevens performed at the Lanierland Music Park in Cumming, Georgia with Pinkard & Bowden.

=== 21st century ===
In February 2002, after the September 11 attacks, Stevens released Osama—Yo' Mama: The Album after the title track, which was released as a single in late 2001, peaked at number 48 on the Hot Country Songs chart in 2001. The album reached number 29 on the Top Country Albums chart. In April 2010, he released We the People, a CD/DVD of political songs. It was in the top five on the Billboard Comedy Album chart.

RAY-ality TV ran on digital TV from March 2013 to January 2014. In March 2014, a webisode series, also titled Rayality TV was launched. Later in 2014, Stevens co-starred in the movie Campin' Buddies. He published an autobiographical memoir, Ray Stevens' Nashville, in 2014.

In 2015, the album Here We Go Again came out on March 24. It includes the Taylor Swift spoof single "Taylor Swift is Stalking Me" and "Come to the USA". Also in 2015, Stevens began producing and hosting Ray Stevens Nashville, a 30-minute weekly music variety show on cable TV. The show was rebranded as Ray Stevens CabaRay Nashville. In early 2018, his own CabaRay Showroom opened to the public, where the tv show is filmed on stage.

== Personal life ==
Stevens and Penny Jackson Ragsdale were married for over 60 years. They had two daughters, Suzi and Timi, and four grandchildren.

Penny died December 31, 2021, after a lengthy battle with cancer. Two days prior, Stevens had canceled his New Year's Eve concert at CabaRay due to his wife's rapidly declining health.

Stevens was hospitalized after complaining of chest pains on July 4, 2025. He was eventually determined to have suffered a "mild" heart attack, and he was placed in intensive care. Stevens successfully underwent heart surgery on July 7 and left intensive care two days later. On April 5, 2026, he was hospitalized after falling and breaking his neck, and was classified to be in relatively good condition and recovery was expected with use of a neck brace.

== Accolades ==
=== Grammy awards ===
Year	Category	Nominated work	Result	Ref.
1970	Best Contemporary Male Vocalist	"Gitarzan"	Nominated	
1971	Best Contemporary Male Vocalist	"Everything Is Beautiful"	Won	
1971	Best Arrangement Accompanying Vocalist(s)	"Everything Is Beautiful"	Nominated	
1971	Contemporary Song	"Everything Is Beautiful"	Nominated	
1971	Record of the Year	"Everything Is Beautiful"	Nominated	
1971	Song of the Year	"Everything Is Beautiful"	Nominated	
1971	Best Inspirational Performance	"Love Lifted Me"	Nominated	
1976	Best Arrangement Accompanying Vocalist(s)	"Misty"	Won	
1976	Best Country Vocal Performance – Male	"Misty"	Nominated	
1980	Best Comedy Recording	"I Need Your Help, Barry Manilow"	Nominated	
1988	Best Comedy Recording	"Would Jesus Wear a Rolex"	Nominated	
