= Brandy (Scott English song) =

1972 single by Scott English also covered by Barry Manilow

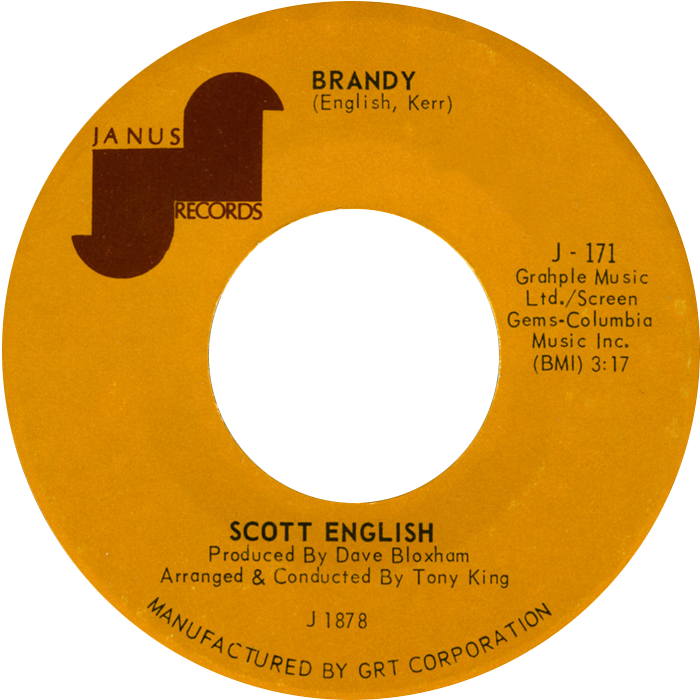
- One of side-A labels of the US single

Single by Scott English
- B-side: "Lead Me Back"
- Released: February 1972
- Recorded: 1971
- Genre: Folk rock; pop
- Label: Trojan, Horse, Fontana (UK); Janus (US)
- Songwriters: Scott English; Richard Kerr

"Brandy", later called "Mandy", is a song written by Scott English and Richard Kerr. It was originally recorded by English in 1971 and reached the top 20 of the UK Singles Chart.

"Brandy" was recorded by New Zealand singer Bunny Walters in 1972, but achieved greater success when released in the United States in 1974 by Barry Manilow. For Manilow's recording, the title changed from "Brandy" to "Mandy" to avoid confusion with Looking Glass's "Brandy (You're a Fine Girl)". His version reached the top of the US Billboard Hot 100. Later, it was recorded by many other artists. The song was a UK number one hit in 2003 for Irish boyband Westlife.

== Scott English original recording ==
Under the title "Brandy", the selection's original title, the song charted in 1971 for Scott English, one of its co-composers, whose version of it reached number 12 on the UK Singles Chart. It was also released in the United States, where it was a minor hit, remaining in the lower portion of the Hot 100.

The suggestion that Scott English wrote the song about a favorite dog is apparently false. English later said that a reporter called him early one morning asking who "Brandy" was, and an irritated English made up the dog story to get the reporter off his back. In a 2013 interview, he said the idea for the song title came while he was in France and someone tried to make a dirty joke saying "Brandy goes down fine after dinner, doesn't she" although in English, a drink does not actually have a grammatical gender, and the line does not have the intended double entendre. He later wrote the song in London. He said he hated the Manilow version because he took out part of a verse and made it a bridge, but he later loved it because it bought him houses. The song was inspired by his life, he said, the face in the window being his father.

Record World said it was "just the sort of slightly uptempo pop ballad that should click on these shores."

=== Charts ===
Chart (1971–72)	Peak position
Australia (Kent Music Report)	13
Belgium (Ultratop 50 Flanders)	26
Canada RPM Top Singles	73
UK Singles (Official Charts)	12
US Billboard Hot 100	91
US Cash Box Top 100	98

== Bunny Walters version ==
"Brandy"

Single by Bunny Walters
- B-side: "Didn't We"
- Released: 1972
- Recorded: 1972
- Genre: Pop
- Label: Impact
- Songwriters: Scott English, Richard Kerr
- Producer: Peter Dawkins

In 1972, Bunny Walters recorded "Brandy" and had a hit with it in New Zealand. The backing vocals were by The Yandall Sisters. He later included the song on his album Very Best of Bunny Walters.

Chart (1972)	Peak position
New Zealand (Listener)	4

== Barry Manilow version ==
"Mandy"
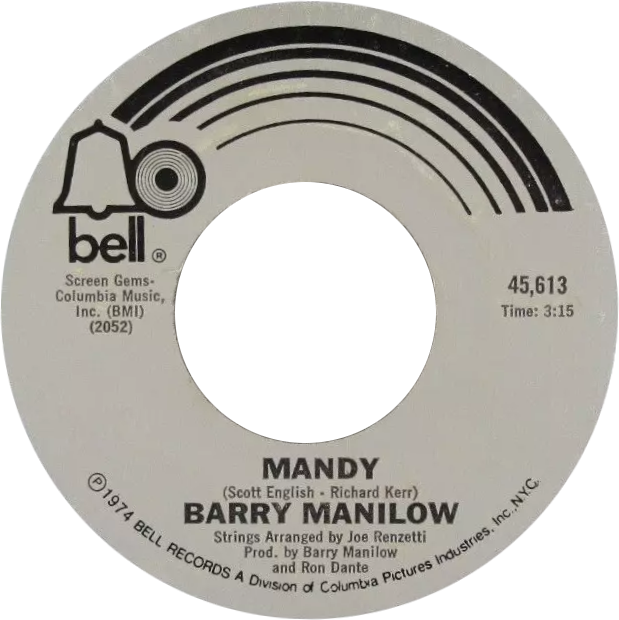
- One of side-A labels of the US single

Single by Barry Manilow

from the album Barry Manilow II
- B-side: "Something's Comin' Up"
- Released: October 7, 1974
- Recorded: 1974
- Genre: Soft rock
- Length: 3:15 (single version); 3:32 (album version)
- Label: Bell
- Songwriters: Scott English, Richard Kerr
- Producers: Barry Manilow, Ron Dante

Barry Manilow singles chronology
"Let's Take Some Time to Say Goodbye" (1974)	"Mandy" (1974)	"It's a Miracle" (1975)

Music video
- "Mandy" (TopPop, 1973) on YouTube

In 1974, Barry Manilow recorded the song under the title name of "Mandy". The song was Manilow's first No. 1 hit on the Billboard Hot 100 and Easy Listening chart, and his first gold single.

Following English's 1971 recording of "Brandy", Looking Glass's "Brandy (You're a Fine Girl)" hit No. 1 in 1972. Manilow said that when Clive Davis suggested that Manilow record English's song, Manilow knew it was wrong for him but recorded it anyway. Davis heard the recording and said, "That's terrible" and Manilow agreed. Manilow said he went back to the studio and made changes, including slowing down the song. He changed the title to "Mandy" to avoid confusion. Joe Renzetti arranged the record.

Cash Box said "a lushly orchestrated ballad it is a classic love song with Barry doing some fine piano work." Record World said that "Manilow's performance builds from his solo foundation to the rafters of Joe Renzetti's romantic strings."

In "Judgment," the season 2 premiere of Angel, the eponymous protagonist sings "Mandy" at Lorne's Caritas karaoke bar in exchange for information.

The song is used for the intro of the British comedy series Mandy.

=== Charts ===
==== Weekly charts ====
Chart (1974–1975)	Peak position
Australia (Kent Music Report)	4
Canada Top Singles (RPM)	1
Canada Adult Contemporary (RPM)	1
Ireland (IRMA)	6
New Zealand (Recorded Music NZ)	30
Italy	29
South Africa (Springbok)	3
UK Singles (Official Charts)	11
US Billboard Hot 100	1
US Adult Contemporary (Billboard)	1
US Cash Box Top 100	1
West Germany (GfK)	19

==== Year-end charts ====
Chart (1975)	Position
Australia (Kent Music Report)	30
US Billboard Hot 100	35
US Billboard Easy Listening	3
US Cash Box Top 100	17
Canada RPM Top Singles	12
Canada RPM Adult Contemporary	5

=== Certifications ===
Region	Certification	Certified units/sales
New Zealand (RMNZ)	Gold	15,000^{‡}
United Kingdom (BPI)	Gold	400,000^{‡}
United States (RIAA)	Gold	1,000,000^{^}
^{^} Shipments figures based on certification alone.^{‡} Sales+streaming figures based on certification alone.

== Westlife version ==
"Mandy"

Single by Westlife

from the album Turnaround
- Released: November 17, 2003
- Studio: Rokstone; Olympic (London, UK)
- Length: 3:19
- Label: RCA, BMG, S
- Songwriters: Scott English, Richard Kerr
- Producer: Steve Mac

Westlife singles chronology
"Hey Whatever" (2003)	"Mandy" (2003)	"Obvious" (2004)

Music video
- "Mandy" on YouTube

Irish boy band Westlife covered "Mandy" in 2003 and released it as the second single from their fourth studio album, Turnaround (2003), in November 2003. The single entered at number one on the UK Singles Chart on the 23rd November 2003, to become the band's 12th number-one single, thus also becoming the group's 16th consecutive UK top 5 hit. The single sold over 200,000 copies in the UK to earn a silver sales certification. Westlife's version was the fifth-best-selling single of 2003 in Ireland. "Mandy" is the band's 16th-best-selling single in paid-for and combined sales in the UK as of January 2019.

The music video was filmed in the United Grand Lodge of England, Freemasons' Hall, London. Their version won them their third Record of the Year award in under five years. Their version is also the longest leap to the top (from 200 to 1) in UK music history. In Westlife - Our Story, the band said the idea to record and release the song was Simon Cowell's.

=== Track listings ===
UK CD1

1. "Mandy" – 3:19
2. "You See Friends (I See Lovers)" – 4:11
3. "Greased Lightning" – 3:19
4. "Mandy" (video) – 3:19
5. "Mandy" (making of the video) – 2:00

UK CD2

1. "Mandy" – 3:19
2. "Flying Without Wings" (live) – 3:41

=== Charts ===
==== Weekly charts ====
Chart (2003–2004)	Peak position
Austria (Ö3 Austria Top 40)	16
Belgium (Ultratop 50 Flanders)	50
Belgium (Ultratip Bubbling Under Wallonia)	3
CIS Airplay (TopHit)	98
Czech Republic (IFPI)	1
Denmark (Tracklisten)	2
Denmark Airplay (Tracklisten)	10
Europe (Eurochart Hot 100)	3
Europe (European Hit Radio)	18
Finland Airplay (Radiosoittolista)	7
Germany (GfK)	14
Ireland (IRMA)	1
Latvia (Latvijas Top 40)	9
Netherlands (Single Top 100)	27
Norway (VG-lista)	15
Poland Airplay (Polish Airplay Charts)	1
Romania (Romanian Top 100)	34
Russia Airplay (TopHit)	79
Scottish Singles Sales (Official Charts)	1
Sweden (Sverigetopplistan)	4
Switzerland (Schweizer Hitparade)	30
UK Singles (Official Charts)	1
UK Airplay (Music Week)	7

==== Year-end charts ====
Chart (2003)	Position
CIS (TopHit)	158
Ireland (IRMA)	5
Russia Airplay (TopHit)	129
UK Singles (OCC)	31

Chart (2004)	Position
Europe (Billboard)	99
Germany (Media Control GfK)	68
Sweden (Hitlistan)	79
Taiwan (Hito Radio)	77

=== Certifications and sales ===
Region	Certification	Certified units/sales
United Kingdom (BPI)	Gold	400,000^{‡}
^{‡} Sales+streaming figures based on certification alone.

== Other versions ==
"Mandy" has been covered many times. Other notable cover versions include:

- Andy Williams (1975)
- Johnny Mathis (1975)
- Ray Conniff & The Singers (1975)
- Patty Pravo (1975) in Italian as "Rispondi" on her Incontro album.
- Kai Hyttinen (1975) sung as "Leena" with Finnish text by Vexi Salmi.
- Claude François (1976) sang the French version ("Mandy" as well)
- Jimmy Castor did a mostly instrumental version on his album Maximum Stimulation in 1977.
- Karel Gott (1977) covered it as a Christmas song titled "Jsou svátky", with Czech lyrics written by Zdeněk Borovec.
- Drop Nineteens (1992)
- Richard Clayderman (1994)
- Me First and the Gimme Gimmes (1997)
- Yuki Koyanagi (2000)
- The Langley Schools (2001) recorded a version in 1976-7, discovered and rereleased 25 years later in The Langley Schools Music Project
- Catedral (2002), a brazilian rock band, recorded the song with lyrics in portuguese, titled the song as "Meu bem" for their album "Mais Do Que Imaginei"
- Box Car Racer (2002)
- Mandy & Randy (2003)
- Helmut Lotti (2003)
- Bradley Joseph (2005)
- Clay Aiken (2005)
- Donny Osmond (2007)
- Jang Keun-suk (2011)
- The Bad Plus (2016)
- Joe Pernice (2020)

== See also ==
- List of Hot 100 number-one singles of 1975 (U.S.)
- List of number-one adult contemporary singles of 1974 (U.S.)
- List of number-one singles of 2003 (Ireland)
- List of number-one singles from the 2000s (UK)
