= Backstreet Boys discography =

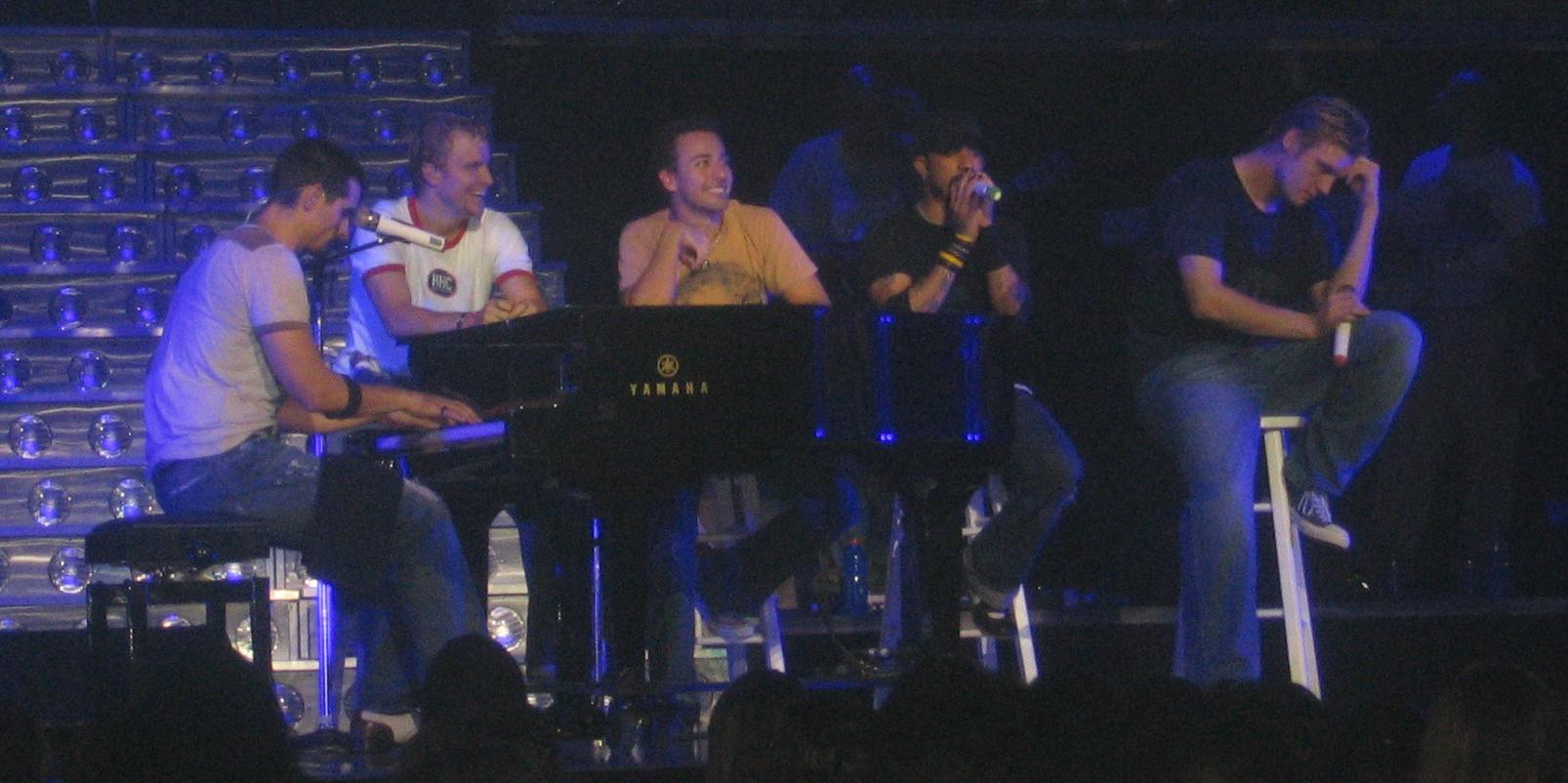
- Backstreet Boys performing in 2005
- Studio albums: 10
- Live albums: 2
- Compilation albums: 5
- Singles: 33
- Music videos: 34
- Reissue albums: 2
- Other appearances: 1

The discography of American pop vocal group Backstreet Boys consists of 10 studio albums, 33 singles, two live albums, five compilation albums and 34 music videos. As of 2019, they have sold more than 130 million records worldwide, becoming the best-selling boy band of all time. Formed in Orlando, Florida in 1993, the group consists of Nick Carter, Brian Littrell, Kevin Richardson, AJ McLean and Howie Dorough. Richardson left the group in 2006 to pursue other interests, but rejoined in 2012. The Backstreet Boys released their debut single "We've Got It Goin' On" in 1995, which peaked at number 69 on the Billboard Hot 100. The single, however, entered the top 10 in many European countries. Their debut album, Backstreet Boys, was released internationally in 1996, and was certified three times platinum in Europe, and diamond in Canada. In 1997, they released their second international album, Backstreet's Back, which continued their international success. At the same time, they released their second self-titled album, Backstreet Boys, in the United States. It peaked at number four and became the tenth best-selling album of the 1990s.

In 1999, the Backstreet Boys released their third and most successful album to date, Millennium, which entered the Billboard 200 at number one with first-week sales of 1,133,000 copies. It became the best-selling album of the year and sold over 24 million copies internationally. In the following year, they released their fourth album, Black & Blue, which also entered the Billboard 200 at number one with first-week sales of over a million copies. After the Black & Blue Tour in 2001, the Backstreet Boys entered a hiatus. They released their fifth studio album, Never Gone, in 2005. The album debuted at number three on the Billboard 200, selling over 291,000 copies in its first week of release. Never Gone's follow-up, Unbreakable, released in 2007, became their first album not to receive any certification in the United States. The following album, This Is Us, became their seventh consecutive album to make the top ten on the Billboard 200, with first-week sales of 42,000 copies. The group has also released two compilation albums, including the platinum-certified The Hits: Chapter One.

The Backstreet Boys have received a total of nine Grammy nominations, including five nominations in 2000. According to the RIAA in 2007, they were the best selling artist in the US with shipments of over 37 million albums. They are also ranked as the seventh best-selling group of the SoundScan era in the United States (nineteenth best-selling artist overall), with sales of 30,900,000 albums, and as the third best-selling artist of the SoundScan era in Canada, with sales of 4,128,000 albums.

== Albums ==
=== Studio albums ===
List of albums, with selected chart positions, certifications and sales figures
Title	Album details	Peak chart positions										Sales	Certifications
Title	Album details	US	AUS	AUT	CAN	GER	JPN	NLD	SWE	SWI	UK	Sales	Certifications
Backstreet Boys	Released: May 6, 1996; Label: Jive; Format: CD, cassette, LP, MiniDisc	—	6	1	1	1	54	7	7	1	12	World: 10,000,000	ARIA: Platinum; BPI: Platinum; BVMI: Platinum; IFPI AUT: 3× Platinum; IFPI SWE: Platinum; IFPI SWI: 3× Platinum; MC: Diamond; RIAJ: Gold
Backstreet's Back	Released: August 11, 1997; Label: Jive; Format: CD, cassette, MiniDisc	—	2	1	1	1	23	1	1	1	2	CAN: 1,048,000; EU: 5,000,000	ARIA: 6× Platinum; BPI: 2× Platinum; BVMI: 2× Platinum; IFPI AUT: Platinum; IFPI SWE: 2× Platinum; IFPI SWI: 2× Platinum; MC: Diamond; RIAJ: Gold
Millennium	Released: May 18, 1999; Label: Jive; Format: CD, cassette, MiniDisc	1	2	1	1	1	6	1	1	1	2	World: 24,000,000; US: 13,812,000; CAN: 1,073,000; JPN: 1,000,000	RIAA: Diamond (13× Platinum); ARIA: 3× Platinum; BPI: Platinum; BVMI: 3× Gold; IFPI AUT: Gold; IFPI SWE: Platinum; IFPI SWI: Platinum; MC: Diamond; RIAJ: 4× Platinum; RMNZ: Platinum
Black & Blue	Released: November 21, 2000; Label: Jive; Format: CD, cassette, MiniDisc	1	2	3	1	1	3	2	3	1	13	World: 15,000,000; US: 5,936,000	RIAA: 8× Platinum; ARIA: Platinum; BPI: Gold; BVMI: 3× Gold; IFPI AUT: Gold; IFPI SWE: Platinum; IFPI SWI: Platinum; RIAJ: 3× Platinum
Never Gone	Released: June 14, 2005; Label: Jive; Format: CD, cassette, digital download	3	6	4	2	1	3	3	3	3	11	World: 3,000,000; US: 1,771,000; JPN: 750,000	RIAA: Platinum; ARIA: Platinum; BPI: Gold; BVMI: Gold; IFPI SWI: Gold; MC: Platinum; RIAJ: 2× Platinum
Unbreakable	Released: October 30, 2007; Label: Jive; Format: CD, LP, digital download	7	25	21	2	4	1	10	28	6	21	World: 1,700,000; US: 229,000; JPN: 300,000	MC: Gold; RIAJ: Platinum
This Is Us	Released: October 6, 2009; Label: Jive; Format: CD, digital download	9	35	47	3	10	2	5	17	9	39	US: 130,000; JPN: 230,000	BPI: Silver; RIAJ: Platinum
In a World Like This	Released: July 30, 2013; Label: K-Bahn, BMG; Format: CD, LP, digital download	5	30	8	2	3	4	1	25	1	16	JPN: 109,077	RIAJ: Gold
DNA	Released: January 25, 2019; Label: K-Bahn, RCA; Format: CD, LP, digital download	1	5	1	1	2	2	4	28	1	7	US: 227,000; CAN: 61,000	MC: Platinum
A Very Backstreet Christmas	Released: October 14, 2022; Label: K-Bahn, BMG; Format: CD, LP, digital download	17	—	19	5	9	38	6	—	13	—		
"—" denotes items which were not released in that country or failed to chart.

=== Live albums ===
List of live albums, with selected chart positions
Title	Album details	Peak chart positions
Title	Album details	SWE
A Night Out with the Backstreet Boys	Released: November 17, 1998; Label: Jive; Format: CD	24
For the Fans	Released: August 28, 2000; Label: Jive, Zomba; Format: CD, VHS	—

=== Reissues ===
List of reissues, with selected chart positions, certifications and sales figures
Title	Album details	Peak chart positions	Sales	Certifications
Title	Album details	US	Sales	Certifications
Backstreet Boys	Released: August 12, 1997; Label: Jive; Format: CD, cassette, LP, MiniDisc	4	US: 11,687,000	RIAA: 14× Platinum
Millennium 2.0	Released: July 11 2025; Label: K-Bahn, BMG, RCA; Format: CD, LP, digital download	—		

=== Compilation albums ===
List of compilation albums, with selected chart positions, certifications and sales figures
Title	Album details	Peak chart positions										Sales	Certifications
Title	Album details	US	AUS	AUT	CAN	GER	JPN	NLD	SWE	SWI	UK	Sales	Certifications
The Hits – Chapter One	Released: October 30, 2001; Label: Jive; Format: CD, cassette, Mini Disc	4	32	6	1	4	1	9	13	10	5	World: 6,000,000; US: 1,834,000; JPN: 841,000	RIAA: Platinum; ARIA: Platinum; BPI: 2× Platinum; BVMI: Gold; IFPI SWE: Gold; IFPI SWI: Gold; RIAJ: Million
Playlist: The Very Best of Backstreet Boys	Released: January 26, 2010; Label: SMC; Format: CD	—	47	42	49	—	—	—	—	—	—		ARIA: Gold; BPI: Gold
The Essential Backstreet Boys	Released: September 26, 2013; Label: RCA, Legacy; Format: 2×CD	—	—	—	—	—	—	—	—	—	—		
The Box Set Series Backstreet Boys	Released: May 2015 (US); Label: Jive, Legacy; Format: 4×CD	—	—	—	—	—	—	—	—	—	—		
The New Best Of	Released: June 16, 2016 (Europe); Label: Sony Music; Format: 2×CD	—	—	40	—	19	—	—	—	49	—		
"—" denotes items which were not released in that country or failed to chart.

== Singles ==
=== As lead artist ===
List of singles as lead artist, with selected chart positions and certifications
Title	Year	Peak chart positions										Certifications	Album
Title	Year	US	AUS	AUT	CAN	GER	NLD	NZ	SWE	SWI	UK	Certifications	Album
"We've Got It Goin' On"	1995	69	74	3	15	4	5	36	14	3	3	BPI: Silver; BVMI: Gold; IFPI AUT: Gold	Backstreet Boys
"I'll Never Break Your Heart"	1995	35	10	5	47	5	3	11	7	2	8	ARIA: Platinum; BVMI: Gold	Backstreet Boys
"Get Down (You're the One for Me)"	1996	—	44	4	6	5	3	34	17	7	14	BVMI: Gold	Backstreet Boys
"Quit Playing Games (With My Heart)"	1996	2	27	1	3	1	7	27	15	1	2	RIAA: Platinum; ARIA: Gold; BPI: Silver; BVMI: Platinum; IFPI AUT: Gold; RMNZ: Gold	Backstreet Boys
"Anywhere for You"	1997	—	—	7	—	3	7	—	18	3	4	BVMI: Gold	Backstreet Boys
"Everybody (Backstreet's Back)"	1997	4	3	2	2	2	5	6	4	2	3	RIAA: Platinum; ARIA: 4× Platinum; BPI: 2× Platinum; BVMI: Gold; IFPI SWE: Gold; RMNZ: 3× Platinum	Backstreet's Back
"As Long as You Love Me"	1997	—	2	2	2	3	5	1	4	4	3	ARIA: 3× Platinum; BPI: Platinum; BVMI: Platinum; IFPI SWE: Platinum; RMNZ: 2× Platinum	Backstreet's Back
"All I Have to Give"	1998	5	4	4	3	8	7	3	6	8	2	RIAA: Platinum; ARIA: Platinum; BPI: Silver; IFPI SWE: Gold	Backstreet's Back
"I Want It That Way"	1999	6	2	1	2	1	1	1	2	1	1	RIAA: 3× Platinum; ARIA: 5× Platinum; BPI: 4× Platinum; BVMI: Platinum; IFPI AUT: Gold; IFPI SWE: 2× Platinum; IFPI SWI: Gold; MC: 9× Platinum; RIAJ: 2× Platinum; RMNZ: 6× Platinum	Millennium
"Larger Than Life"	1999	25	3	15	4	5	6	11	4	10	5	ARIA: 2× Platinum; BPI: Gold; IFPI SWE: Gold; MC: Platinum; RMNZ: Gold	Millennium
"Show Me the Meaning of Being Lonely"	1999	6	19	8	1	3	2	2	2	2	3	ARIA: Gold; BPI: Silver; BVMI: Gold; IFPI SWE: Platinum; MC: Platinum; RMNZ: Gold	Millennium
"The One"	2000	30	41	25	4	15	21	15	25	19	8	MC: Gold	Millennium
"Shape of My Heart"	2000	9	5	4	1	2	3	1	1	1	4	ARIA: Platinum; BPI: Gold; BVMI: Gold; IFPI SWE: Platinum; RIAJ: Gold; RMNZ: Platinum	Black & Blue
"The Call"	2001	52	19	23	—	17	9	19	5	30	8		Black & Blue
"More Than That"	2001	27	25	27	—	25	28	29	11	28	12		Black & Blue
"Drowning"	2001	28	49	9	11	11	13	27	3	13	4	ARIA: Gold	The Hits – Chapter One
"Incomplete"	2005	13	1	6	—	3	4	12	9	3	8	RIAA: Gold; ARIA: 2× Platinum	Never Gone
"Just Want You to Know"	2005	70	22	22	—	20	27	—	28	29	8		Never Gone
"Crawling Back to You"	2005	—	—	—	—	—	—	—	—	—	—		Never Gone
"I Still..."	2006	—	16	47	—	45	78	—	35	56	—		Never Gone
"Inconsolable"	2007	86	43	31	68	17	38	—	22	8	24	RIAJ: Gold	Unbreakable
"Helpless When She Smiles"	2007	—	—	—	—	34	83	—	—	—	—		Unbreakable
"Straight Through My Heart"	2009	— (Note: "Straight Through My Heart" did not enter the Billboard Hot 100, but peaked at number six on the Bubbling Under Hot 100 chart.)	54	45	19	22	—	—	10	30	72	RIAJ: Platinum	This Is Us
"Bigger"	2009	—	—	—	—	—	—	—	—	—	—		This Is Us
"Don't Turn Out the Lights" (with New Kids on the Block as NKOTBSB)	2011	— (Note: "Don't Turn Out the Lights" did not enter the Billboard Hot 100 but peaked on the Bubbling Under Hot 100 Singles chart at number 14.)	—	—	46	—	—	—	—	—	—		NKOTBSB
"It's Christmas Time Again"	2012	—	—	—	—	—	—	—	—	—	—		A Very Backstreet Christmas
"In a World Like This"	2013	—	—	—	—	100	—	—	—	—	—		In a World Like This
"Show 'Em (What You're Made Of)"	2013	—	—	—	—	—	—	—	—	—	—		In a World Like This
"Don't Go Breaking My Heart"	2018	63	50	—	65	68	—	—	—	98	—	ARIA: Gold; MC: Gold	DNA
"Chances"	2018	— (Note: "Chances" did not enter the Billboard Hot 100, but peaked at number seven on the Bubbling Under Hot 100 chart.)	—	—	55	63	—	— (Note: "Chances" did not enter the NZ Top 40 Singles Chart, but peaked at number 37 on the NZ Hot Singles Chart.)	—	82	—	MC: Gold	DNA
"No Place"	2019	—	—	—	83	—	—	— (Note: "No Place" did not enter the NZ Top 40 Singles Chart, but peaked at number 30 on the NZ Hot Singles Chart.)	—	93	—	MC: Gold	DNA
"Matches" (with Britney Spears)	2020	— (Note: "Matches" did not enter the Billboard Hot 100, but peaked at number 11 on the Digital Song Sales chart.)	—	—	— (Note: "Matches" did not enter the Canadian Hot 100, but peaked at number 7 on the Canada Digital Song Sales chart.)	— (Note: "Matches" did not enter the Official German Singles Chart, but peaked at number 22 on the Germany Digital Singles Sales chart.)	—	— (Note: "Matches" did not enter the NZ Top 40 Singles Chart, but peaked at number 40 on the NZ Hot Singles Chart.)	—	—	—		Glory
"Last Christmas"	2022	—	—	—	—	—	—	—	—	—	—		A Very Backstreet Christmas
"Christmas in New York"	2022	—	—	—	—	—	—	—	—	—	—		A Very Backstreet Christmas
"Hey"	2025	—	—	—	—	—	—	—	—	—	—		Millennium 2.0
"Bottle Up"	2026	—	—	—	—	—	—	—	—	—	—		Paw Patrol: The Dino Movie
"—" denotes items which were not released in that country or failed to chart.

=== As featured artist ===
Title	Year	Peak chart positions			Certifications	Album
Title	Year	US	CAN	NZ	Certifications	Album
"Friends Never Say Goodbye" (Elton John featuring Backstreet Boys)	2000	—	—	50		The Road to El Dorado
"God, Your Mama, and Me" (Florida Georgia Line featuring Backstreet Boys)	2017	46	79	—	RIAA: 2× Platinum	Dig Your Roots
"Let It Be Me" (Steve Aoki featuring Backstreet Boys)	2019	—	—	—		Neon Future IV
"—" denotes a recording that did not chart or was not released.

== Other charted songs ==
Song	Year	Peak chart positions		Album
Song	Year	BEL (FL)	GER	Album
"Christmas Time"	1996	—	76	"Quit Playing Games (with My Heart)"
"Together"	2022	50	—	A Very Backstreet Christmas

== Videography ==
=== Home videos ===
Title	Details	Certifications
The Video	Released: March 24, 1998; Label: Zomba; Format: VHS	MC: Diamond; BVMI: 4× Platinum
Live in Concert	Released: March 24, 1998; Label: Jive; Format: VHS	MC: Diamond; BVMI: Platinum
All Access Video	Released: June 2, 1998; Label: Jive; Formats: VHS, DVD	RIAA: 6× Platinum
Behind the Scenes	Released: September 22, 1998; Label: Jive; Formats: VHS	BVMI: Platinum; ARIA: Gold
A Night Out with the Backstreet Boys	Released: November 17, 1998; Label: Jive; Formats: VHS, DVD	RIAA: 3× Platinum
Homecoming: Live in Orlando	Released: April 27, 1999; Label: Jive; Formats: VHS, DVD	RIAA: 3× Platinum
Backstreet Stories	Released: June 21, 1999; Label: A.M.; Formats: VHS, DVD	
Standing Room Only	Released: February 22, 2000; Label: Jive; Formats: VHS	
Secret Diary	Released: 2000; Label: Jive; Formats: VHS, VCD, DVD	
Around the World	Released: September 11, 2001; Label: Jive; Formats: VHS, DVD	RIAA: Platinum
The Hits	Released: 2001; Label: Jive; Formats: VHS, DVD	RIAA: Platinum
Never Gone: The Videos	Released: December 13, 2005; Label: Jive; Formats: DVD	
This Is Us Japan Tour 2010	Released: 2010; Label: Sony Music Japan; Formats: DVD	
In a World Like This Japan Tour 2013	Released: 2014; Label: Sony Music Japan; Formats: DVD, Blu-ray	
Backstreet Boys: Show 'Em What You're Made Of	Released: April 28, 2015; Label: K-BAHN; Formats: DVD, Blu-ray	

=== Music videos ===
Title	Year	Director(s)
"We've Got It Goin' On"	1995	Lionel C. Martin
"I'll Never Break Your Heart" Snow Version	1995	Lionel C. Martin
"Get Down (You're the One for Me)"	1996	Alan Calzatti
"Quit Playing Games (With My Heart)"	1996	Kai Sehr
"Anywhere for You"	1997	Lionel C. Martin
"Everybody (Backstreet's Back)" Long Version / Short Version	1997	Joseph Kahn
"As Long as You Love Me"	1997	Nigel Dick
"All I Have to Give" TV Version / DVD Version	1998	Nigel Dick
"I'll Never Break Your Heart" / "Nunca Te Haré Llorar" U.S. Version	1998	Billie Woodruff
"I Want It That Way"	1999	Wayne Isham
"Larger Than Life"	1999	Joseph Kahn
"Show Me the Meaning of Being Lonely"	1999	Stuart Gosling
"The One"	2000	Chris Hafner and Kevin Richardson
"Shape of My Heart"	2000	Matthew Rolston
"The Call" Video Version / Remix Without Rap	2001	Francis Lawrence
"More Than That"	2001	Marcus Raboy
"Drowning" Wet Version	2002	Paul Boyd
"Drowning" Second Version	2002	Nigel Dick
"Incomplete"	2005	Joseph Kahn
"Just Want You to Know"	2005	Marc Klasfeld
"I Still..."	2006	Matt McDermitt
"Inconsolable"	2007	Ray Kay
"Helpless When She Smiles"	2008	Bernard Gourley
"Straight Through My Heart"	2009	Kai Regan
"Bigger"	2010	Frank Borin
"It's Christmas Time Again"	2012	
"In a World Like This"	2013	Don Tyler
"Show 'Em (What You're Made Of)"	2014	Jon Vulpine
"God, Your Mama, and Me" (with Florida Georgia Line)	2017	TK McKamy
"Don't Go Breaking My Heart"	2018	Rich + Tone
"Chances"	2018	Rene Elizondo and AJ McLean
"No Place"	2019	Sam Houston and Andrew Straw
"Let It Be Me"(with Steve Aoki)	2019	Tyler Dunning Evans
"Last Christmas"	2022	Bill Fishman
"Christmas in New York"	2022	Jude Daniel Chacon
"Bottle Up"	2026	Scotty Nguyen
