= Show Me the Meaning of Being Lonely =

1999 single by Backstreet Boys

Single by Backstreet Boys

from the album Millennium
- B-side: "I'll Be There for You"; "You Wrote the Book on Love"
- Released: December 14, 1999
- Studio: Cheiron, Polar (Stockholm, Sweden)
- Genre: Pop; R&B; Latin pop
- Length: 3:54
- Label: Jive
- Songwriters: Max Martin; Herbie Crichlow
- Producers: Max Martin; Kristian Lundin

Backstreet Boys singles chronology
"Larger than Life" (1999)	"Show Me the Meaning of Being Lonely" (1999)	"The One" (2000)

Audio sample
- A sample from "Show Me the Meaning of Being Lonely" by Backstreet Boys: file; help

Music video
- "Show Me the Meaning of Being Lonely" on YouTube

"Show Me the Meaning of Being Lonely" is a song by American boy band Backstreet Boys, taken from their third studio album, Millennium (1999). It was written by Max Martin and Herbie Crichlow, with production by Martin and Kristian Lundin.

Jive Records selected the track to be released as the third single from the album on December 14, 1999. It received favorable reviews from music critics, who commended the lush orchestration, its melody, and the group's vocal performance. It has also experienced success on the charts, reaching the top 10 in most countries it charted, also peaking at number three on the UK Singles Chart and number six on the US Billboard Hot 100 chart.

The music video for the track was released on New Year's Eve of 1999 and was directed by Stuart Gosling. It follows each band member in a separate dramatic history, with the band uniting for the video's end. The song also earned a Grammy Award nomination during the 43rd Grammy Awards for Best Pop Performance by a Duo or Group with Vocals.

== Background and release ==
"Show Me the Meaning of Being Lonely" was written by Max Martin and Herbie Crichlow, while Martin also produced it. On the November 27, 1999, issue of Billboard, it was reported that Jive Records selected "Show Me the Meaning of Being Lonely" as Millennium's third single. The song was sent to US radio on December 14, 1999, and was released in the United Kingdom as a CD and cassette single on February 21, 2000.

== Composition ==
"Show Me the Meaning of Being Lonely" is a pop and R&B ballad, with Latin pop influences. Lyrically, the song deals with heartbreak and how the protagonist is dealing with loneliness. "Show me the meaning of being lonely/Is this the feeling I need to walk with/Tell me why I can't be there where you are/There's something missing in my heart," they sing in the chorus. It is set in the key of F♯ minor and G♯ minor.

== Critical reception ==
The song received acclaim from most music critics. Stephen Thomas Erlewine of AllMusic picked it as a standout track on the album. While reviewing their compilation, The Hits: Chapter One (2001), Erlewine wrote that "the rest of the singles that fill out the compilation aren't quite as good as "I Want It That Way", "As Long as You Love Me", "Quit Playing Games (with My Heart)", "Everybody (Backstreet's Back)" and "Larger than Life" (although "Show Me the Meaning of Being Lonely" is)." Chuck Taylor of Billboard named it a "keepsake ballad that will have the quintet's loyal legions panting over their loss and loneliness." Taylor also called it "a beautifully produced anthem" and praised its melody, saying, "It will instantly lock itself into the pop culture consciousness." Taylor finished his review, writing that the single is "the best ballad of the season and a sure-fire way to return the Boys to full glory." Chuck Arnold from People Magazine said that it "captures the ache of 'something missing in my heart' with a Latin-tinged lushness." Arion Berger of Rolling Stone commented that the song "digs its melodic claws into your skull on the first listen—it's the swooniest blending of the five vocalists' timbres to date, and mighty pretty besides."

== Commercial performance ==
"Show Me the Meaning of Being Lonely" was a success on the charts, reaching the top ten in most countries it charted. In the United States, the song debuted at number 74 on the Billboard Hot 100 chart while on the issue of March 18, 2000, the song peaked at number six, remaining at the peak position for two further weeks. In other Billboard component charts, the song also succeeded, topping the Top 40 Mainstream chart and reaching number two on the Hot Adult Contemporary Tracks. In Canada, the song topped the RPM Top Singles chart for two weeks.

In the United Kingdom, "Show Me the Meaning of Being Lonely" peaked at number three, becoming their last single to reach the top three and eleventh top-ten single. The song became a success in countries like the Netherlands, New Zealand, Sweden and Switzerland, reaching number two. It also reached the top-ten in Austria, Belgium, Finland, Germany, Ireland, Italy and Norway. It only performed moderately in Australia, where it reached number 19, becoming their lowest charting-single since "Quit Playing Games (with My Heart)" in 1997.

== Accolades ==
"Show Me the Meaning of Being Lonely" was nominated for a Grammy Award at the 43rd Annual Grammy Awards for Best Pop Performance by a Duo or Group with Vocals, but lost to Steely Dan's "Cousin Dupree." Emily Exton of VH1 placed the song at number seven on their "20 Backstreet Boys Songs" list, writing that the song is "a more mature sound that showcased Kevin’s vocals instead of mostly his dark and mysterious looks. Here, the Boys tackle grief surprisingly well, without pouring on too much schmaltz or over-complicating things." Danielle Sweeney of The Celebrity Cafe also placed it at number seven on her "Top 10 Backstreet Boys Songs", writing that, "it's their most emotional song, containing the lyrics, 'how can it be you’re asking me to feel the things you never show?'. Deep, guys."

== Music video ==
=== Background ===
The music video for "Show Me the Meaning of Being Lonely" was made by Director/Cinematographer Stuart Gosling in Los Angeles from December 11–12, 1999, following the 1999 Billboard Music Awards. It follows each band member separately in a sad story until they unite during the instrumental break and final choruses. The video, somewhat darker in tone than any of the band's previous releases, touches on several of the band's real-life issues. Brian Littrell had undergone open heart surgery the previous year for a defect he has had since birth. AJ McLean is shown holding a picture of a girlfriend, which is dedicated to a dear friend of his who died in a car accident. The video also uses footage that represents Kevin Richardson and his deceased father Jerald Richardson. Nick Carter's scene sees him save a woman to represent a fan who almost got run over by a bus. The woman who Howie Dorough sees represents his sister Caroline Dorough, who died a year earlier of the disease lupus. Additionally, the bus that McLean rides is marked for "Denniz Street," and is driven by an actor who resembles Denniz Pop (who died in 1998 and produced some Backstreet Boys tracks, besides being the mentor of the song's producer Max Martin). An alternate version of the video was dedicated in his honor.

=== Synopsis ===
The video opens with a dedication to Denniz Pop and everyone who lost a loved one. Then, it begins at a hospital, in which Brian Littrell watches doctors try to save a patient, also portrayed by Littrell, alluding to his open heart surgery he had. AJ McLean's scenes take place on a coach bus, which is driven by an actor who looks like Denniz Pop while mourning the loss of a girlfriend whose photo he carries. He sees her appear on the bus, but she fades away. Kevin Richardson watches an old-age film of himself and his father in an apartment. Nick Carter walks down a city street in the rain and saves a woman from almost being hit by the bus that McLean is on. Howie Dorough drinks from a teacup at an old-style bar as a woman in red runs towards him but fades away before she reaches him. Richardson arrives to meet Dorough, and they leave the building together. McLean's bus arrives, and Littrell exits the hospital. While the woman lights the memorial candles for the deceased, the five band members congregate and begin walking down the street together. Most of the video is shot in a black-and-white scheme. Only certain red elements are brightly colored until the end when the band walks out of the city into a brightly colored field.

== Track listings ==
- UK CD single
1. "Show Me the Meaning of Being Lonely" – 3:54
2. "I'll Be There for You" – 4:34
3. "You Wrote the Book on Love" – 4:38
- US 2×12-inch vinyl
1. "Show Me the Meaning of Being Lonely" (Soul Solution House of Loneliness Vocal) – 7:22
2. "Show Me the Meaning of Being Lonely" (Jason Nevins Crossover Instrumental) – 3:57 [track only, no vocals]
3. "Show Me the Meaning of Being Lonely" (Soul Solution Mix Show Version) – 4:12
4. "Show Me the Meaning of Being Lonely" (LP Version) – 3:54
5. "Show Me the Meaning of Being Lonely" (Jason Nevins Crossover Remix) – 3:55
6. "Show Me the Meaning of Being Lonely" (Remix Acapella) – 3:55 [vocals only, no track]
7. "Show Me the Meaning of Being Lonely" (Soul Solution House of Loneliness Dub) – 6:50 [track only, no vocals]
8. "Show Me the Meaning of Being Lonely" (Bonus Beats) – 2:55 [track only, no vocals]

== Charts ==
=== Weekly charts ===
Weekly chart performance
Chart (2000–2001)	Peak position
Australia (ARIA)	19
Austria (Ö3 Austria Top 40)	8
Belgium (Ultratop 50 Flanders)	4
Belgium (Ultratop 50 Wallonia)	14
Canada (Nielsen Soundscan)	8
Canada Top Singles (RPM)	1
Canada Adult Contemporary (RPM)	1
Czech Republic (IFPI)	9
Denmark (IFPI)	6
Europe (Eurochart Hot 100)	4
Europe (European Hit Radio)	6
Finland (Suomen virallinen lista)	3
Finland Airplay (Radiosoittolista)	1
Germany (GfK)	3
Greece (IFPI Greece)	7
Hungary (Mahasz)	4
Iceland (Íslenski Listinn Topp 40)	8
Ireland (IRMA)	5
Italy (FIMI)	4
Italy (Musica e dischi)	5
Latvia (Latvijas Top 30)	13
Netherlands (Dutch Top 40)	2
Netherlands (Single Top 100)	2
Netherlands Airplay (Music & Media)	1
New Zealand (Recorded Music NZ)	2
Norway (VG-lista)	3
Romania (Romanian Top 100)	1
Scottish Singles Sales (Official Charts)	2
Spain (Promusicae)	4
Spain Airplay (Top 40 Radio)	22
Sweden (Sverigetopplistan)	2
Switzerland (Schweizer Hitparade)	2
UK Singles (Official Charts)	3
UK Airplay (Music Week)	5
UK Indie (Official Charts)	2
US Billboard Hot 100	6
US Adult Contemporary (Billboard)	2
US Adult Pop Airplay (Billboard)	15
US Pop Airplay (Billboard)	1
US Rhythmic Airplay (Billboard)	8
US Top 40 Tracks (Billboard)	2

=== Year-end charts ===
Annual chart rankings
Chart (2000)	Position
Australia (ARIA)	94
Belgium (Ultratop 50 Flanders)	71
Belgium (Ultratop 50 Wallonia)	75
Brazil (Crowley)	20
Europe (Eurochart Hot 100)	43
Europe (European Hit Radio)	45
Germany (Media Control)	56
Ireland (IRMA)	58
Netherlands (Dutch Top 40)	64
Netherlands (Single Top 100)	57
New Zealand (RIANZ)	11
Romania (Romanian Top 100)	21
Sweden (Hitlistan)	31
Switzerland (Schweizer Hitparade)	47
UK Singles (OCC)	66
UK Airplay (Music Week)	50
US Billboard Hot 100	31
US Adult Contemporary (Billboard)	6
US Adult Top 40 (Billboard)	41
US Mainstream Top 40 (Billboard)	16
US Rhythmic Top 40 (Billboard)	38

Chart (2001)	Position
US Adult Contemporary (Billboard)	42

== Certifications ==
Certifications and sales
Region	Certification	Certified units/sales
Australia (ARIA)	Gold	35,000^{^}
Brazil (Pro-Música Brasil)	Gold	30,000^{‡}
Canada (Music Canada)	Platinum	80,000^{‡}
Denmark (IFPI Danmark)	Gold	45,000^{‡}
Germany (BVMI)	Gold	250,000^{^}
Netherlands (NVPI)	Gold	40,000^{^}
New Zealand (RMNZ)	Gold	15,000^{‡}
Sweden (GLF)	Platinum	30,000^{^}
United Kingdom (BPI)	Gold	400,000^{‡}
^{^} Shipments figures based on certification alone.^{‡} Sales+streaming figures based on certification alone.

== Release history ==
Street dates
Region	Date	Format(s)	Label(s)	Ref.
United States	December 14, 1999	Rhythmic contemporary; contemporary hit radio	Jive	
United States	January 10, 2000	Adult contemporary radio	Jive	
United Kingdom	February 21, 2000	CD; cassette	Jive	

== See also ==
- List of Romanian Top 100 number ones of the 2000s
