= A Night Out with the Backstreet Boys =

Live album by Backstreet Boys
- Released: November 17, 1998
- Recorded: March 28, 1998; Cologne, Germany
- Genre: Pop
- Length: 70:34
- Label: Jive

Backstreet Boys chronology
Backstreet Boys (U.S.) (1997)	A Night Out with the Backstreet Boys (1998)	Millennium (1999)

A Night Out with the Backstreet Boys is the first unplugged acoustic concert show by the Backstreet Boys. It was recorded live at Viva Television in Cologne, Germany on March 28, 1998. It was first released in VHS format with a bonus CD titled Selections from A Night Out with the Backstreet Boys, and was released later on DVD on November 7, 2000. Two songs performed and included in this album, "Where Can We Go From Here?" and "Who Do You Love", were never released anywhere else as studio recordings.

== Track listing ==
VHS/DVD

1. "Who Do You Love"
2. "As Long as You Love Me"
3. "10,000 Promises"
4. "That's What She Said" / "Where Can We Go from Here?" (Brian Littrell)
5. "Lay Down Beside Me" (AJ McLean)
6. "I Need You Tonight (Heaven in Your Eyes)" (Nick Carter)
7. "My Heart Stays with You" (Howie Dorough)
8. Untitled Kevin solo (Kevin Richardson)
9. "Like a Child"
10. "All I Have to Give"
11. "If I Don't Have You" / "I'll Never Break Your Heart"
12. "Quit Playing Games (with My Heart)"
13. "Let's Have a Party"
14. "All I Have to Give" (music video; TV version)
15. "I'll Never Break Your Heart" (music video; U.S. version)

Bonus CD

1. "10.000 Promises" – 4:10
2. "That's What She Said" / "Where Can We Go from Here?" – 5:28
3. "Like a Child" – 6:18
4. "All I Have to Give" – 4:56
5. "If I Don't Have You" / "I'll Never Break Your Heart" – 5:14
6. "Let's Have a Party" – 4:00
7. Millennium sneak preview: "The One" / "Show Me the Meaning of Being Lonely" / "I Need You Tonight" – 4:20

== Charts ==
Chart performance for A Night Out with the Backstreet Boys
Chart (1998)	Peak position
Swedish Albums (Sverigetopplistan)	24

== Certifications ==
Certifications for A Night Out with the Backstreet Boys
Region	Certification	Certified units/sales
United States (RIAA)	3× Platinum	300,000^{^}
^{^} Shipments figures based on certification alone.
