= Backstreet's Back Tour =

1997–98 concert tour by the Backstreet Boys

- Tour by Backstreet Boys
- Associated album: Backstreet's Back; Backstreet Boys
- Start date: December 27, 1997
- End date: December 31, 1998
- Legs: 8
- No. of shows: 113

Backstreet Boys concert chronology
- Backstreet Boys: Live in Concert Tour (1996–1997); Backstreet's Back Tour (1997–1998); Into the Millennium Tour (1999–2000)

The Backstreet's Back Tour was a concert tour by the Backstreet Boys that began in 1997 and concluded in 1998. It was also the first tour to be held all over the United States. The set list included songs from their second album Backstreet's Back (International) (1997) and several songs from their debut U.S. album, Backstreet Boys (1997).

During this tour, Backstreet Boys member Brian Littrell underwent surgery to correct a congenital heart defect he had had since birth. Surgery was necessary because the hole in his heart was getting larger. The group postponed a couple of show dates but Littrell was back performing with the group within weeks after the surgery only to have oxygen tanks in the wings of the stage.

== Opening acts ==
- Emjay (December 27, 1997 – January 7, 1998)
- Los Umbrellos (January 14, 1998 - February 1, 1998)
- Westlife (March 17–18, 1998)
- Solid HarmoniE (March 17–22, 1998)
- Thomas Jules-Stock (March 24, 1998 - April 15, 1998)
- N-Tyce (March 24, 1998 - April 15, 1998)
- Aaron Carter (July 8, 1998 - September 15, 1998)
- Jimmy Ray (July 8, 1998 - September 15, 1998)
- S.O.A.P. (July 8, 1998 - September 15, 1998)
- Chris Durán (September 18–19, 1998)
- INOJ (November 18–19, 1998)
- LFO (December 30–31, 1998)

== Setlist ==
Europe

The following songs were performed at the March 29, 1998 concert held at the Oslo Spektrum in Oslo, Norway. It does not represent all concerts for the European leg of the tour.

1. "That's The Way I Like It"
2. "I Wanna Be with You"
3. "Hey, Mr. D.J. (Keep Playin' This Song)"
4. "My Heart Stays with You" (performed by Howie Dorough)
5. "Lay Down Beside Me" (performed by AJ McLean)
6. "Nobody but You" (performed by Kevin Richardson)
7. "That's What She Said" (performed by Brian Littrell)
8. "I Need You Tonight" (performed by Nick Carter)
9. "Let's Have a Party"
10. "Quit Playing Games (with My Heart)"
11. "All I Have to Give"
12. "Anywhere for You"
13. "I'll Never Break Your Heart"
14. "As Long as You Love Me"
15. "Get Down (You're the One for Me)"
16. "We've Got It Goin' On"
17. "Everybody (Backstreet's Back)"
North America

The following songs were performed at the July 10, 1998 concert held at the Miami Arena in Miami, Florida. It does not represent all concerts for the North American leg of the tour.

1. "That's The Way I Like It"
2. "If I Ever Fall in Love" (a cappella)
3. "Hey, Mr. D.J. (Keep Playin' This Song)"
4. "My Heart Stays with You" (performed by Howie Dorough)
5. "Lay Down Beside Me" (performed by AJ McLean)
6. "Nobody but You" (performed by Kevin Richardson)
7. "That's What She Said" (performed by Brian Littrell)
8. "I Need You Tonight" (performed by Nick Carter)
9. "Let's Have a Party"
10. "Quit Playing Games (with My Heart)"
11. "All I Have to Give"
12. "Darlin'"
13. "Anywhere for You"
14. "I'll Never Break Your Heart"
15. "As Long as You Love Me"
16. "Get Down (You're the One for Me)"
17. "We've Got It Goin' On"
18. "Everybody (Backstreet's Back)"
South America

The following songs were performed at the February 14, 1998 concert held at Viña del Mar in Chile. It does not represent all concerts for the South American leg of the tour.

1. "That's The Way I Like It"
2. "Hey, Mr. DJ (Keep Playin' This Song)"
3. "Let's Make a Toast to Our Love" (a cappella)
4. "All I Have to Give"
5. "Donde Quieras Yo Iré" (a cappella)
6. "Anywhere for You"
7. "Quit Playing Games (with My Heart)"
8. "I'll Never Break Your Heart"
9. "As Long as You Love Me"
10. "Get Down (You're the One for Me)"
11. "We've Got It Goin' On"
12. "Everybody (Backstreet's Back)"
Homecoming

The set list of the following songs were part of the New Year's concert which was broadcast on December 31, 1998 and was later released on VHS and DVD as 'Homecoming: Live in Orlando'.

1. "That's The Way I Like It"
2. "Hey, Mr. D.J. (Keep Playin' This Song)"
3. "Just To Be Close To You" (a cappella)
4. "My Heart Stays with You" (performed by Howie Dorough)
5. "Lay Down Beside Me" (performed by AJ McLean)
6. "Nobody but You" (performed by Kevin Richardson)
7. "That's What She Said" (performed by Brian Littrell)
8. "I Need You Tonight" (performed by Nick Carter)
9. "Let's Have A Party"
10. "Quit Playing Games (With My Heart)" (play instruments by the group, then introduced the real band)"
11. "All I Have To Give"
12. "Anywhere for You"
13. "I'll Never Break Your Heart"
14. "As Long as You Love Me"
15. "Get Down (You're the One for Me)"
16. "We've Got It Goin' On"
17. "Everybody (Backstreet's Back)"

== Tour dates ==
Date	City	Country	Venue
North America
December 27, 1997	Halifax	Canada	Halifax Metro Centre
December 29, 1997	Quebec City	Canada	Colisée de Québec
December 30, 1997	Montreal	Canada	Molson Centre
December 31, 1997	Montreal	Canada	Molson Centre
January 1, 1998	Montreal	Canada	Molson Centre
January 2, 1998	Ottawa	Canada	Corel Centre
January 3, 1998	Toronto	Canada	SkyDome
January 5, 1998	Montreal	Canada	Molson Centre
January 6, 1998	Montreal	Canada	Molson Centre
January 7, 1998	Quebec City	Canada	Colisée de Québec
January 14, 1998	Charlotte	United States	Independence Arena
January 15, 1998	Atlanta	United States	Fox Theatre
January 16, 1998	Louisville	United States	Palace Theatre
January 17, 1998	Detroit	United States	Fox Theatre
January 18, 1998	Columbus	United States	Palace Theatre
January 20, 1998	Tampa	United States	USF Sun Dome
January 21, 1998^{[A]}	West Palm Beach	United States	Coral Sky Amphitheatre
January 22, 1998^{[B]}	Ponte Vedra Beach	United States	Nease High School Football Stadium
January 23, 1998	Washington, D.C.	United States	DAR Constitution Hall
January 24, 1998	Providence	United States	Providence Performing Arts Center
January 27, 1998	Albany	United States	Palace Theatre
January 28, 1998	Plainview	United States	The Vanderbilt
January 30, 1998	Indianapolis	United States	Murat Theatre
January 31, 1998	Kansas City	United States	Memorial Hall
February 1, 1998	Dallas	United States	Bronco Bowl
South America
February 13, 1998^{[C]}	Viña del Mar	Chile	Anfiteatro de la Quinta Vergara
February 15, 1998	Tigre	Argentina	Anfiteatro del Parque de la Costa
North America Leg 2
February 21, 1998	Lake Buena Vista	United States	House of Blues
March 15, 1998^{[D]}	Orlando	United States	Universal CityWalk
Europe
March 17, 1998	Dublin	Ireland	Point Theatre
March 18, 1998	Dublin	Ireland	Point Theatre
March 20, 1998	Birmingham	England	NEC Arena
March 21, 1998	London	England	Wembley Arena
March 22, 1998	London	England	Wembley Arena
March 24, 1998	Copenhagen	Denmark	Bella Center
March 25, 1998	Gothenburg	Sweden	Scandinavium
March 27, 1998^{[E]}	Mannheim	Germany	Mannheimer Maimarkthalle
March 28, 1998^{[F]}	Cologne	Germany	Viva Television Studios
March 29, 1998	Oslo	Norway	Oslo Spektrum
March 30, 1998	Stockholm	Sweden	Stockholm Globe Arena
March 31, 1998	Stockholm	Sweden	Stockholm Globe Arena
April 1, 1998	Copenhagen	Denmark	Forum Copenhagen
April 2, 1998	Arnhem	Netherlands	GelreDome XS
April 3, 1998	Arnhem	Netherlands	GelreDome XS
April 4, 1998	Ghent	Belgium	Flanders Expo
April 5, 1998	Ghent	Belgium	Flanders Expo
April 6, 1998	Amnéville	France	Galaxie Amnéville
April 7, 1998	Paris	France	Zénith de Paris
April 9, 1998	Barcelona	Spain	Palau dels Esports de Barcelona
April 12, 1998	Valencia	Spain	Plaza de Toros de Valencia
April 13, 1998	Madrid	Spain	Palacio de Deportes
April 14, 1998	Madrid	Spain	Palacio de Deportes
April 15, 1998	Lisbon	Portugal	Praça de Touros de Cascais
North America
April 24, 1998^{[G]}	Bay Lake	United States	Frontierland
April 25, 1998^{[G]}	Bay Lake	United States	Frontierland
May 1, 1998^{[G]}	Bay Lake	United States	Frontierland
May 2, 1998^{[G]}	Bay Lake	United States	Frontierland
May 8, 1998^{[G]}	Bay Lake	United States	Frontierland
May 30, 1998^{[H]}	Mansfield	United States	Great Woods Center for the Performing Arts
July 8, 1998	Charlotte	United States	Charlotte Coliseum
July 9, 1998	Jacksonville	United States	Jacksonville Veterans Memorial Coliseum
July 10, 1998	Miami	United States	Miami Arena
July 11, 1998	Orlando	United States	Orlando Arena
July 12, 1998	Atlanta	United States	Coca-Cola Lakewood Amphitheatre
July 15, 1998	Bristow	United States	Nissan Pavilion
July 16, 1998	Philadelphia	United States	CoreStates Center
July 17, 1998	New York City	United States	Radio City Music Hall
July 18, 1998	New Haven	United States	New Haven Veterans Memorial Coliseum
July 19, 1998	Albany	United States	Pepsi Arena
July 21, 1998	Darien	United States	Darien Lake Performing Arts Center
July 22, 1998	Cuyahoga Falls	United States	Blossom Music Center
July 23, 1998	Noblesville	United States	Deer Creek Music Center
July 24, 1998	Auburn Hills	United States	The Palace of Auburn Hills
July 25, 1998	Louisville	United States	Freedom Hall
July 26, 1998	St. Louis	United States	Kiel Center
July 28, 1998	The Woodlands	United States	Cynthia Woods Mitchell Pavilion
July 29, 1998	Dallas, Texas	United States	Coca-Cola Starplex
July 31, 1998	Kansas City	United States	Kemper Arena
August 1, 1998	Tinley Park	United States	New World Music Theatre
August 2, 1998	Milwaukee	United States	Marcus Amphitheater
August 4, 1998	Greenwood Village	United States	Coors Amphitheatre
August 6, 1998	West Valley City	United States	E Center
August 7, 1998	Las Vegas	United States	MGM Grand Garden Arena
August 8, 1998	Los Angeles	United States	Universal Amphitheatre
August 9, 1998	Los Angeles	United States	Universal Amphitheatre
August 11, 1998	Concord	United States	Concord Pavilion
August 13, 1998	Portland	United States	Rose Garden
August 14, 1998	Seattle	United States	KeyArena
August 15, 1998	Vancouver	Canada	General Motors Place
August 17, 1998	Calgary	Canada	Canadian Airlines Saddledome
August 18, 1998	Edmonton	Canada	Commonwealth Stadium
August 19, 1998	Saskatoon	Canada	Saskatchewan Place
August 20, 1998	Winnipeg	Canada	Winnipeg Arena
August 22, 1998	Toronto	Canada	Molson Amphitheatre
August 23, 1998	Montreal	Canada	Parc des Îles
August 25, 1998	Halifax	Canada	Citadel Hill
August 27, 1998	Uniondale	United States	Nassau Veterans Memorial Coliseum
August 28, 1998	Moosic	United States	Lackawanna County Stadium
August 29, 1998	East Rutherford	United States	Continental Airlines Arena
August 30, 1998^{[I]}	Geddes	United States	New York State Fair Grandstand
August 31, 1998^{[J]}	Essex Junction	United States	Champlain Valley Expo Grandstand
September 2, 1998	Uniondale	United States	Nassau Veterans Memorial Coliseum
September 3, 1998	Providence	United States	Providence Civic Center
September 4, 1998	Columbia	United States	Merriweather Post Pavilion
September 5, 1998	Allentown	United States	Allentown Fair Grandstand
September 14, 1998^{[K]}	Allegan	United States	Allegan County Fair Grandstand
September 15, 1998^{[L]}	York	United States	York Fair Grandstand
South America
September 18, 1998	Buenos Aires	Argentina	Estadio Camilo Cichero
September 19, 1998	Buenos Aires	Argentina	Estadio Camilo Cichero
North America
November 18, 1998	Minneapolis	United States	Target Center
November 19, 1998	Minneapolis	United States	Target Center
December 30, 1998	Tampa	United States	Ice Palace
December 31, 1998	Orlando	United States	Orlando Arena

Festivals and other miscellaneous performances

^{A} South Florida Fair
^{B} Jam at Nease
^{C} Festival Internacional de la Canción de Viña del Mar
^{D} Orlando Bands Together
^{E} Radio Regenbogen Party
^{F} VIVA Unplugged '98

^{G} Grad Nite
^{H} Kiss 108 Party
^{I} Great New York State Fair
^{J} Champlain Valley Fair
^{K} Allegan County Fair
^{L} York Fair

Cancellations and rescheduled shows

January 9, 1998	Ponte Vedra Beach, Florida	Nease High School Football Stadium	Rescheduled to January 22, 1998
March 14, 1998	Orlando, Florida	Universal CityWalk	Moved to March 15, 1998; concert was a part of the "Orlando Band Together" Benefit
March 17, 1998	Dublin, Ireland	RDS Simmonscourt	Moved to the Point Theatre
March 18, 1998	Dublin, Ireland	RDS Simmonscourt	Moved to the Point Theatre
September 13, 1998	Shakopee, Minnesota	Canterbury Park	Cancelled; concert was a part of "Last Chance Summer Dance". The group allowed ticket holders to attend the November 1998 concerts in Minneapolis.
November 27, 1998	Cologne, Germany	Kölnarena	Cancelled; concert was a part of "Hand in Hand for Children"
December 1, 1998	Cologne, Germany	Kölnarena	Cancelled
December 2, 1998	Munster, Germany	Muensterlandhalle	Cancelled
December 3, 1998	Berlin, Germany	Velodrom	Cancelled
December 4, 1998	Leipzig, Germany	Messehalle 7	Cancelled
December 5, 1998	Rieden, Germany	Ostbayernhalle	Cancelled
December 6, 1998	Mannheim, Germany	Maimarkthalle	Cancelled
December 7, 1998	Zürich, Switzerland	Hallenstadion	Cancelled
December 9, 1998	Friedrichshafen, Germany	Messehalle Friedrichshafen	Cancelled
December 10, 1998	Wels, Austria	Bosch-Halle	Cancelled
December 11, 1998	Munich, Germany	Olympiahalle	Cancelled
December 13, 1998	Bremen, Germany	Stadthalle Bremen	Cancelled
December 14, 1998	Oberhausen, Germany	König Pilsener Arena	Cancelled
December 15, 1998	Frankfurt, Germany	Festhalle Frankfurt	Cancelled
December 16, 1998	Stuttgart, Germany	Hanns-Martin-Schleyer-Halle	Cancelled

== Personnel ==
- Lead Vocals: Kevin Richardson, Brian Littrell, Howie Dorough, Nick Carter, AJ McLean
- Tour Director:
- Tour Manager: Paul "Skip" Rickert
- Assistant Tour Manager: Tim Krieg
- Co-Director: Denise McLean
- Co-Director: Nicole Peltz
- Press Liaison: Leila Eminson
- Tour Accountant: Vincent Corry
- Staff Photographer: Andre Csillig
- Musical Director: William 'Bubba' Bryant
- Costume Design: Jill Focke, Kerstin 'Kiki' Theileis, Janine Schreiber
- Choreographer: Fatima Robinson**
- Assistant Choreographer: Richard "Swoop" Whitebear

=== Security ===
- Billy Evans: Nick's Security
- Tom LeBrun: Head of Security/Brian's Security
- Marc Preston: Howie's Security
- Marcus Johnson: AJ's Security
- Carlos Cardenas: Kevin's Security
- John "Q" Elgani: Security

=== Band ===
- Keyboards & Synthesizers: Tommy Smith
- Electric & Acoustic Guitar: Billy Chapin
- Keyboards / Acoustic Guitar: Dennis Gallo
- Percussion / Saxophone: Obie Morant
- Bass Guitar & Synth Bass: Freddy Mollings
- Drums & Percussion: Tim Berkible
