= I Want It That Way =

1999 single by Backstreet Boys

Single by Backstreet Boys

from the album Millennium
- B-side: "My Heart Stays with You"; "I'll Be There for You"
- Released: April 12, 1999
- Recorded: November 1998
- Studio: Cheiron (Stockholm, Sweden)
- Genre: Pop
- Length: 3:33
- Label: Jive
- Songwriters: Andreas Carlsson; Max Martin
- Producers: Kristian Lundin; Max Martin

Backstreet Boys singles chronology
"All I Have to Give" (1998)	"I Want It That Way" (1999)	"Larger than Life" (1999)

Music video
- "I Want It That Way" on YouTube

"I Want It That Way" is a song by American boy band Backstreet Boys. It was released on April 12, 1999, as the lead single from their third studio album, Millennium. It was written by Max Martin and Andreas Carlsson, while Martin and Kristian Lundin produced it. The pop ballad tells of a romantic relationship strained by emotional or physical distance.

Critically, the song was met with a positive reception, with many critics commending its catchiness and calling it the pop ballad of the year. The song was nominated for three Grammy Awards, including Song and Record of the Year, and has been included in lists by Blender, MTV, Rolling Stone and VH1. In 2021, "I Want It That Way" was placed at number 240 on the revised list of Rolling Stone's "500 Greatest Songs of All Time".

"I Want It That Way" is the Backstreet Boys' signature song, and commercially it reached the number-one spot in more than 25 countries, including Austria, Germany, Italy, New Zealand, Switzerland, and the United Kingdom. The single topped the Eurochart Hot 100 for seven consecutive weeks. In the United States, the song peaked at number six on the Billboard Hot 100 chart for eight non-consecutive weeks, while it topped the Adult Contemporary and Mainstream Top 40 charts.

The song has been widely covered and parodied by a range of artists, including other boy bands such as JLS and One Direction. Likewise, its music video, directed by Wayne Isham, received many parodies, most notably by Blink-182 in their music video for "All the Small Things". The original music video received four VMA nominations, winning Viewer's Choice. In 2021, "I Want It That Way" became the group's first music video to reach one billion views on YouTube.

== Background and history ==
After the success of their first two albums, Backstreet Boys (1996) and Backstreet's Back (1997), the band recorded their third studio album during 1998 and 1999. When the members of the Backstreet Boys came to Stockholm in November 1998 for a two-week recording engagement, they were eventually presented with the demo of "I Want It That Way," which at the time only consisted of the main chorus. Upon leaving Sweden on November 16 for a November 17 Oprah taping, vocals for the song had been completed in two days.

Originally, "Larger Than Life" was intended to be the lead single, following the similar formula of their first two albums, having an upbeat lead single. However, after hearing the final version of "I Want It That Way," the group wanted to move more maturely by utilizing a mid-tempo track as the lead single. Zomba Recording executives had to be convinced to approve of the song as the first single because they cited that the group could "alienate fans" with a mid-tempo song that had a vague lyrical meaning. In the end, press information in the form of snippets was authorized for release to radio stations in March 1999 to precede the song's release to radio in April.

=== Censorship ===
On August 19, 2011, China's Ministry of Culture released a list of 100 songs, including the then twelve-year-old "I Want It That Way", that were required to be removed from the Internet. This purge occurred because the ministry claimed that these songs had been released without first being subjected to a mandatory screening process by ministry officials as per official government policy. Media sites were given until September 15 to delete the named songs or face unspecified penalties. The Chinese government claims that such measures are necessary for national security purposes.

== Writing and inspiration ==
I Want It That Way
The guitar intro and first verse of the song.

"I Want It That Way" was written by Andreas Carlsson and Max Martin, while Martin and Kristian Lundin produced the track. The acoustic-guitar arpeggio riff, which forms the song's intro and reiterates throughout the verses, was written at the very end of the recording sessions and was, according to Carlsson, inspired by "Nothing Else Matters" by Metallica. The song is written in the key of A major until approximately the 2-minute, 25-second point of the song, at which point the key modulates to B major. It follows a chord progression of F♯m–D–A with a tempo of 99 beats per minute, and is set in the time signature of 4/4 common time. The group members' vocals span from E_{3} to B_{4}.

=== Alternate version ===
An alternate version of the song with different lyrics was written and recorded by the band in January 1999. The version was included in some early demo presses of the album. In the alternate version, the song has the opposite message ("I love it when I hear you say, I want it that way"). The alternative lyrics were written by Martin and Carlsson in collaboration with Robert John "Mutt" Lange. The alternate version was leaked on the internet via Napster and other methods in the early 2000s and was also played infrequently on some radio stations. It was eventually included on Millennium 2.0 (a 25th anniversary reissue of Millennium) in 2025.

According to a member of the Boys' backing band, Tommy Smith, the album version is the "original version"; the alternate version was recorded because the chorus of the album version did not make sense. In an interview with HitQuarters, Andreas Carlsson confessed that the song was a play with words. He said, "When Max came up with the original idea for the song, it already had the line 'you are my fire, the one desire.' We tried a million different variations on the second verse, and finally, we had to go back to what was sounding so great, 'you are my fire, the one desire.' And then we changed it to 'am I your fire, your one desire,' which made no sense in combination with the chorus – but everybody loved it!"

=== Lyrical interpretation ===
Many critics over the years have questioned the song's lyrical meaning, mainly the line, "I want it that way." Ben Westhoff of LA Weekly dissected the song, writing that its lyrical content "makes zero sense." For Westhoff, "Mainly, the meaning of 'that' is at issue." While analyzing the lyrics, Westhoff perceived that "None of the sentiments in the chorus seem to go with any of the other ones. Even worse, no further explanation is given for what 'that' is." The critic assumed that in the song, "someone simply doesn't like it when his lover expresses preferences, never wanting to hear when his girlfriend says she wants things in particular ways."

Andrew Unterberger of PopDust also questioned the song's lyrics, writing that "the song doesn't make a whole lot of sense" and noting "the odd phrasing of the title and certain other key lyrics." Unterberger also stated, "The phrase 'I want it that way' is similarly devoid of inherent meaning, but it's used recurringly as a kind of conclusive phrase, always calling back to those first two lines, as the song gets gradually more despairing in nature." Unterberger also found out that "The chorus would appear to be in direct opposition to the rest of the song."

Unterberger concluded that the song "is about a relationship that's troubled by matters of emotional and/or physical distance, but that the singer feels strongly enough about to keep it going just the same…until the chorus, at which point he decides that it's not worth the trouble. No, it doesn't make sense, but it's still stirring, beautiful in its own weird way, and undeniably unforgettable. And frankly, we wouldn't want it any other way." Kevin Richardson, a member of the band, explained in an interview that, "Ultimately, the song really doesn't make much sense." Richardson also wrote that co-writer Max Martin's knowledge of English was limited at the time. "There are a lot of songs out there like that don't make sense but make you feel good when you sing along to them, and that's one of them," Richardson commented in an interview.

In 2018, the band seemed to reverse course regarding the depth of the song's lyrical content, at least in part. In response to Chrissy Teigen on Twitter, the official Backstreet Boys Twitter account attempted to clarify the song's meaning of "it," among other points of confusion: "Don't wanna hear you say that you want heartaches and mistakes... or to be 2 worlds apart. We don't want you to want "it" that way - that's the way we want it... for you to not want it that way."

== Critical reception ==
"I Want It That Way" was met with positive reception from most music critics. Stephen Thomas Erlewine of AllMusic picked the song as a highlight on Millennium, calling it an "infectious song that will be enough to satisfy anyone craving more, more, more". In a review of the compilation The Hits – Chapter One (2001), Erlewine further declared that the song "transcend[ed] their era." Jim Farber of Entertainment Weekly wrote that the track "ranks as the bubblegum ballad of the year. It's so likable, it doesn't matter that the group's voices are the sonic equivalent of warm milk."

In a 2024 retrospective review, Jon O'Brien of Billboard considered it the best track from Millennium, saying "...semantics aside, Millennium’s lead single remains a masterclass in boy band balladry. ‘I Want It That Way’ boasts an earworm chorus which feels like it's always been part of pop's fabric, multi-layered harmonies (the “you are” crescendo is particularly glorious) that would put any classic vocal troupe to shame and an iconic airport-based video that perfectly encapsulates the mania the group inspired".

=== Legacy ===
"I Want It That Way" became one of the Backstreet Boys' signature songs and one of the most praised songs by the group. Rolling Stone listed Backstreet Boys at number one on their Readers' Poll: The Best Boy Bands of All Time, writing that "the five-piece scored several huge hits, but their 1999 smash 'I Want It That Way' is a genre-transcending classic". While listing the 10 biggest boy bands from 1987 until 2012, Billboard placed the band at number two, writing, "They tallied up six Hot 100 top 10 hits including well-loved tunes like 'I Want It That Way' and 'Quit Playing Games (with My Heart)'. "I Want It That Way" was also placed at number two on Complex list of The 30 Best Boy Band Songs.

The song was listed at the top of many lists that included the band's best songs. Bill Lamb of About.com ranked the song at the top of the list, writing that "Even Backstreet Boys detractors sometimes admit this single is a gorgeous pop ballad. The quintet's pure singing skills often set them apart from pretenders to the boy band throne." Emily Exton of VH1 chose the song, among twenty, as the best Backstreet Boys song, writing that, "It doesn't take weeks of phoning Carson Daly to know that this the 1999 monster smash is the quintessential modern pop ballad, propelling the genre and the state of the boy band into the 21st century. There's call and response, human emotion, and allusions to fire even Charli XCX can't resist." Danielle Sweeney of TheCelebrityCafe.com also listed "I Want It That Way" at number one, calling it "Quite possibly the greatest pop song of all time. If not, it's at least BSB's greatest song of all time." The song was ranked number 10 on MTV/Rolling Stone list of the "100 Greatest Pop Songs of All Time" in 2000. VH1 listed the song at number three on "The 100 Greatest Songs of the '90s", and number 61 on 100 Greatest Songs of the Past 25 Years in June 2003. Blender ranked at number 16 on their 500 Greatest Songs Since You Were Born list. In 2017, ShortList's Dave Fawbert listed the song as containing "one of the greatest key changes in music history". In 2021, Rolling Stone listed the song at number 240 in its revised list of the "500 Greatest Songs of All Time". In November 2021, the music video reached one billion views on YouTube, joining Guns N' Roses "November Rain", Nirvana's "Smells Like Teen Spirit", 4 Non Blondes' "What's Up?", The Cranberries' "Zombie", and Whitney Houston's "I Will Always Love You" as a small handful of 1990s songs to surpass that mark.

=== Awards and accolades ===
"I Want It That Way" was also nominated for three Grammy Awards at the 42nd edition. It was nominated for "Best Pop Performance by a Duo or Group with Vocals, losing to "Maria Maria", by Santana featuring the Product G&B, "Record of the Year and Song of the Year, both losing to "Smooth", also by Santana, featuring Rob Thomas. The song was also voted the best boyband single of the past 15 years (until 2013) by Amazepop, topping the poll above the likes of 5ive's 'Keep On Movin'' and Westlife's 'Flying Without Wings'.

Year	Ceremony	Award	Result
1999	ALMA Awards	The Ten Outstanding Music Video Performers	Won
1999	BMI Pop Awards	50 Most Performed Songs	Won
1999	1st Mnet Korean Music Festival	Best International Artist	Nominated
1999	1999 MTV Video Music Awards	Video of the Year	Nominated
1999	1999 MTV Video Music Awards	Best Pop Video	Nominated
1999	1999 MTV Video Music Awards	Best Group Video	Nominated
1999	1999 MTV Video Music Awards	Viewer's Choice	Won
1999	MTV Europe Music Awards	Best Song	Nominated
1999	MuchMusic Video Awards	People's Choice Favorite International Group	Won
2000	Grammy Awards	Song of the Year	Nominated
2000	Grammy Awards	Record of the Year	Nominated
2000	Grammy Awards	Best Pop Performance by a Duo or Group with Vocals	Nominated

== Commercial performance ==
"I Want It That Way" became one of the most successful singles by the band in most countries where it has charted. In Australia, the song debuted at number six on the ARIA Singles Chart week of May 16, 1999, dropping to number seven the next week. Later, it climbed to number three before peaking at number two, becoming their highest-charting single, alongside "As Long As You Love Me" (which also peaked at number two), until "Incomplete" surpassed them, in 2005, reaching number-one. It was certified platinum by the Australian Recording Industry Association, for selling over 70,000 copies. In New Zealand, the song debuted at number two, peaking at number-one for two consecutive weeks. It became their second number-one single, after "As Long As You Love Me" (1997). The song was also a number-one hit in Austria, where it debuted at the top before falling to number three and regaining the number-one position again. It was also their second number-one single, after "Quit Playing Games (With My Heart)" (1996). The song also topped the charts of Germany, the Netherlands, Norway, and Switzerland.

"I Want It That Way" became the group's fourth top-10 single in the United States. It opened at number 72 on the Billboard Hot 100 the week of April 24, 1999. After nine weeks it reached and peaked at number six, staying there for eight non-consecutive weeks, also breaking the record for most radio station adds in its first week with 165. It did not chart higher as it was not released commercially during the height of its popularity, so the song was not able to go any higher than No. 6 on the Billboard Hot 100, which then combined only airplay and sales data to determine the week's most popular songs in the US. It also reached the number-one spot on the Billboard Hot Adult Contemporary Tracks charts, where it stayed for ten non consecutive weeks. On the Billboard Mainstream Top 40 chart the single debuted at number 30 the week of April 24, 1999, and reached the top of the chart after twelve weeks, it set a record for most weeks at number one. Additionally, it reached number one on the Radio Songs chart for three weeks from July 17, 1999, to July 31, 1999. In the United Kingdom, "I Want It That Way" debuted at the top of the UK Singles Chart the week of May 15, 1999, and became the band's first and only number-one single. The song was also the 15th biggest selling boyband single of the 1990s in the UK selling 423,300 copies.

== Music video ==
The Backstreet Boys constantly fade and shift positions due to being superimposed onto the Tom Bradley International Terminal by a green screen.

The music video, directed by Wayne Isham, was filmed at Los Angeles International Airport (LAX) April 1–2, 1999, and debuted on MTV's TRL on May 5, 1999. The Tom Bradley International Terminal is seen in numerous shots and also appears as the band sings and dances to the chorus. In the final chorus, as the band prepares to board their plane, a Boeing 727, they are greeted by a crowd of screaming fans bearing signs and flowers. The scenes involving the plane and the final scenes, which featured the fans, were filmed in one of the hangars of LAX. Additionally, a Delta Air Lines L-1011 appears when Howie Dorough sings the fourth verse.

The video features prominent special effects scene transitions between shots. Notably, a high-speed zoom effect makes it appear that the foreground subject has not changed to a new shot while the background has faded in and out of white and shifts between different film speeds during shots. Another special effects sequence using greenscreen, in which the band, dressed in white (video styled by Rachel Zoe), would perform a dance sequence while being manipulated over the backdrop of the Tom Bradley terminal lobby was mostly cut from the video, as it was felt that a dance sequence did not fit with the song. However, elements of the dance remain in the second chorus, as do non-dance elements in that sequence.

The video reached number 35 on "Muchmusic's 100 Best Videos". The song's music video has been parodied by Blink-182 in their music video for the song "All the Small Things". The video ranked number three on the top 10 list of the most iconic videos of all time at the TRL finale. In November 2021, "I Want It That Way" became Backstreet Boys' first music video to reach one billion views on YouTube.

== Covers, parodies, and usage in media ==
Since its release, "I Want It That Way" has been covered numerous times. In 2010, American band Steel Panther released a rock cover of the song. After British boy band One Direction performed a cover of the song in concert in 2013, Backstreet Boys member Howie Dorough voiced his approval, saying, "It's nice to see groups like that pay homage to us. We definitely paid homage to groups in the earlier days..."

The song and the video received many parodies. American radio personality Howard Stern parodied the track on his show called "If I Went The Gay Way", which was sung by his band The Losers and peaked at No. 115 on the Billboard charts. A parody called "Which Backstreet Boy is Gay" became an internet phenomenon and became misattributed to parodist "Weird Al" Yankovic — who actually did parody the song; however, in his actual parody of the song, titled "eBay" (on the album Poodle Hat), the narrator tells of his impulsive habits of buying bizarre items on the online auction site for which the parody is named. The misattributed version "Which Backstreet Boy is Gay" was actually performed by the morning crew at Portland, Oregon, radio station KKRZ-FM, known locally as Z100. One of the most famous parodies came from the American pop punk band Blink-182, who parody the music video for "I Want It That Way" (as well as Britney Spears's "Sometimes" and Christina Aguilera's "Genie in a Bottle") in their video for the song "All the Small Things". Brazilian comedian Rafinha Bastos parodied the band as "Backstreet Farmers", sing the song. In 2013, British-Irish boyband the Wanted parodied the video for their music video for the song "Walks Like Rihanna." The white outfits in the video are also referenced by the boy band Big Time Rush in the music video for their single "Worldwide."

The song is featured on the re-release version of Grand Theft Auto V for PlayStation 4, Microsoft Windows and Xbox One versions released on November 18, 2014, then on PlayStation 5 and Xbox Series X/S versions released on March 15, 2022. It can be heard on the in-game radio station Non-Stop-Pop FM. The remix version of the song, entitled The Jack D. Elliot Remix, was featured on the soundtrack of the 1999 American romantic comedy Drive Me Crazy, starring Melissa Joan Hart and Adrian Grenier. Main characters Shawn and Gus from USA Network's Psych, played by James Roday and Dulé Hill respectively, sing a rendition of the song while trying to block Juliet (Maggie Lawson) from the spotlight during the end credits of the episode "Forget Me Not".

The song was used in the 2015 film Magic Mike XXL. In 2016, Brittany Howard, lead singer of Alabama Shakes, and Jim James, frontman of My Morning Jacket, covered the song in a commercial for American fast food chain Chipotle Mexican Grill. The song was used in the cold open of the Brooklyn Nine-Nine season 5 episode "DFW." Andy Samberg's character has a police lineup sing the song to help a victim identify a killer. An animated version of the music video featuring the five members as guest stars was also used in the 2002 Arthur special "Arthur It's Only Rock and Roll." In 2019, the song was featured in a Doritos commercial during Super Bowl LIII (promoting its new "Flamin' Hot" flavor), which featured Chance the Rapper rapping over a remix of the song. The group itself also makes an appearance in the ad.

On March 1, 2020, American rapper Lil Uzi Vert interpolated the song on their single "That Way" from their second studio album Eternal Atake. Backstreet Boys member Nick Carter praised the song on his Twitter and told Uzi that he wants them to be "featured on our next album". For the 2021 holiday season, the song was used in a television commercial for the Samsung Galaxy Z Flip 3, entitled "You Are The Gift." In 2022, the song appeared in and was used as the title for episode 4, season 1, of HBO's Tokyo Vice, where several characters discuss what "that" alludes to. The song appears in the 2019 Max Martin jukebox musical & Juliet. The song appears as the second song of Act 1 and the penultimate song of Act 2. On October 31, 2024, Lake Street Dive did this song for their annual Halloween Cover song. In 2024, water utility Denver Water released a parody version entitled "I Water That Way." In 2025, American Latin pop artist Prince Royce released his own cover of the song, which hit #1 on the US Latin Airplay chart.

=== 2019 version ===
On May 19, 2019, the band re-recorded the song, entitled "I Want It That Way: Reimagined". The song was released on their YouTube channel and digital streaming platforms in celebration of the song's 20th anniversary.

=== 2025 version ===
On December 15, 2025, the band released a vertical music video as "I Want It That Way (2025 Version)" on their YouTube channel and digital streaming platforms in celebration of tickets sale to “Into The Millennium HOMECOMING: Live in Germany" residency and upcoming show in October 2026.

== Track listings ==
- UK CD1
1. "I Want It That Way" – 3:33
2. "My Heart Stays with You" – 3:37
3. "I'll Be There for You" – 4:43
- UK CD2
1. I Want It That Way
2. I Want It That Way (David Morales Club Version)
3. I Want It That Way (The Wunder Dub)
4. I Want It That Way (Jazzy Jim Vocal Mix)

== Credits and personnel ==
"I Want It That Way"

- Produced by Max Martin and Kristian Lundin
- Recorded at Cheiron Studios, Stockholm, Sweden
- Mixed by Max Martin and Kristian Lundin at Cheiron Studios, Stockholm, Sweden
- Guitar: Esbjörn Öhrwall
- Guitar: Kyla Perlmutter
- Bass: Thomas Lindberg

"My Heart Stays with You"

- (Full Force)
- Produced and Arranged by Full Force
- Recorded by Full Force, Melanie Jones and Tim Donovan at Battery Studios and Po' House Studios, NY
- Mixed by Chris Trevett and Full Force at Battery Studios, NYC

"I'll Be There for You"

- (Gary Baker, Timmy Allen, Wayne Perry)
- Produced by Larry "Rock" Campbell and Timmy Allen
- Recorded by Adam Barber, Chris Trevett and Tim Donovan at Battery Studios, NYC and Parc Studios, Orlando, FL
- Assistant Recording Engineers: Daniel Wierup and Sharon Kearney
- Mixed by Nigel Green at Battery Studios, NYC
- Instruments: Larry "Rock" Campbell
- Assistant Mix Engineer: Daniel Wierup
- String Arrangement: Jimmy Biondolillo and Timmy Allen
- Conductor: Jimmy Biondolillo
- Additional Background Vocals: Sekou Aiken

== Charts ==
=== Weekly charts ===
1999–2000 weekly chart performance for "I Want It That Way"
Chart (1999–2000)	Peak position
Australia (ARIA)	2
Austria (Ö3 Austria Top 40)	1
Belgium (Ultratop 50 Flanders)	4
Belgium (Ultratop 50 Wallonia)	7
Canada (Nielsen SoundScan)	1
Canada Top Singles (RPM)	2
Canada Adult Contemporary (RPM)	1
Costa Rica (Notimex)	1
Czech Republic (IFPI)	1
Denmark (IFPI)	2
El Salvador (Notimex)	3
Estonia (Eesti Top 20)	3
Europe (Eurochart Hot 100)	1
Europe (European Hit Radio)	1
Finland (Suomen virallinen lista)	4
Finland Airplay (Radiosoittolista)	12
France (SNEP)	20
France Airplay (SNEP)	8
Germany (GfK)	1
Greece (IFPI)	1
Guatemala (Notimex)	1
Honduras (Notimex)	2
Hungary (MAHASZ)	2
Iceland (Íslenski Listinn Topp 40)	18
Ireland (IRMA)	3
Italy (FIMI)	1
Italy (Musica e dischi)	1
Italy Airplay (Music & Media)	3
Japan Hot 100 (Billboard)	35
Latvia (Latvijas Top 20)	1
Netherlands (Dutch Top 40)	1
Netherlands (Single Top 100)	1
New Zealand (Recorded Music NZ)	1
Nicaragua (Notimex)	1
Norway (VG-lista)	1
Panama (Notimex)	5
Scottish Singles Sales (Official Charts)	1
Spain (Promusicae)	1
Spain Airplay (Top 40 Radio)	1
Sweden (Sverigetopplistan)	2
Switzerland (Schweizer Hitparade)	1
UK Singles (Official Charts)	1
UK Airplay (Music Week)	11
UK Independent (Official Charts)	1
US Billboard Hot 100	6
US Adult Contemporary (Billboard)	1
US Adult Pop Airplay (Billboard)	11
US Pop Airplay (Billboard)	1
US Rhythmic Airplay (Billboard)	5
US Top 40 Tracks (Billboard)	1
Zimbabwe (ZIMA)	1

2010–2014 weekly chart performance for "I Want It That Way"
Chart (2010–2014)	Peak position
Russia Airplay (TopHit)	199
Ukraine Airplay (TopHit)	65

2023–2025 weekly chart performance for "I Want It That Way"
Chart (2023–2026)	Peak position
Estonia Airplay (TopHit)	90
Finland Airplay (Radiosoittolista)	93
Global Excl. US (Billboard)	198
Iceland (Tónlistinn)	9
Kazakhstan Airplay (TopHit)	68
Nigeria Bubbling Under Hot 100 (TurnTable)	14
Nigeria Airplay (TurnTable)	77
Poland (Polish Airplay Top 100)	53
Romania Airplay (TopHit)	84
South Africa Airplay (TOSAC)	13

=== Monthly charts ===
2024 monthly chart performance for "I Want It That Way"
Chart (2024)	Peak position
Kazakhstan Airplay (TopHit)	78

2025 monthly chart performance for "I Want It That Way"
Chart (2025)	Peak position
Romania Airplay (TopHit)	91

=== Year-end charts ===
1999 year-end chart performance for "I Want It That Way"
Chart (1999)	Position
Australia (ARIA)	25
Austria (Ö3 Austria Top 40)	19
Belgium (Ultratop 50 Flanders)	33
Belgium (Ultratop 50 Wallonia)	35
Brazil Airplay (Crowley)	10
Canada Top Single (RPM)	3
Canada Adult Contemporary (RPM)	1
Europe (Eurochart Hot 100)	14
Europe (European Hit Radio)	17
Germany (Media Control)	14
Italy (Musica e dischi)	12
Latvia (Latvijas Top 50)	9
Netherlands (Dutch Top 40)	11
Netherlands (Single Top 100)	14
New Zealand (RIANZ)	17
Romania (Romanian Top 100)	22
Spain (AFYVE)	5
Sweden (Hitlistan)	9
Switzerland (Schweizer Hitparade)	7
Taiwan (Hito Radio)	13
UK Singles (OCC)	35
US Billboard Hot 100	15
US Adult Contemporary (Billboard)	6
US Mainstream Top 40 (Billboard)	7
US Rhythmic Top 40 (Billboard)	13

2000 year-end chart performance for "I Want It That Way"
Chart (2000)	Position
US Adult Contemporary (Billboard)	11

2025 year-end chart performance for "I Want It That Way"
Chart (2025)	Position
Estonia Airplay (TopHit)	168
Kazakhstan Airplay (TopHit)	164

=== Decade-end charts ===
Decade-end chart performance for "I Want It That Way"
Chart (1990–1999)	Position
Canada (Nielsen SoundScan)	56

== Certifications and sales ==
Certifications for "I Want It That Way"
Region	Certification	Certified units/sales
Australia (ARIA)	5× Platinum	350,000^{‡}
Austria (IFPI Austria)	Gold	25,000^{*}
Belgium (BRMA)	Platinum	50,000^{*}
Brazil (Pro-Música Brasil)	Diamond	250,000^{‡}
Canada (Music Canada)	9× Platinum	720,000^{‡}
Denmark (IFPI Danmark)	3× Platinum	270,000^{‡}
Finland	—	31,000
Germany (BVMI)	3× Gold	900,000^{‡}
Italy	—	70,000
Italy (FIMI) since 2009	Platinum	70,000^{‡}
Japan (RIAJ) Digital single	2× Platinum	500,000^{*}
Japan (RIAJ) Full-length ringtone	Platinum	250,000^{*}
Japan (RIAJ) Ringtone	3× Platinum	750,000^{*}
Netherlands (NVPI)	Gold	50,000^{^}
New Zealand (RMNZ)	6× Platinum	180,000^{‡}
Portugal (AFP)	Platinum	40,000^{‡}
Spain (Promusicae)	2× Platinum	120,000^{‡}
Sweden (GLF)	2× Platinum	60,000^{^}
Switzerland (IFPI Switzerland)	Gold	25,000^{^}
United Kingdom (BPI)	4× Platinum	2,400,000^{‡}
United States (RIAA)	3× Platinum	3,000,000^{‡}
Streaming
Japan (RIAJ)	Gold	50,000,000^{†}
^{*} Sales figures based on certification alone.^{^} Shipments figures based on certification alone.^{‡} Sales+streaming figures based on certification alone.^{†} Streaming-only figures based on certification alone.

== Release history ==
Release dates and formats for "I Want It That Way"
Region	Date	Format(s)	Label(s)	Ref.
United States	April 12, 1999	Rhythmic contemporary; contemporary hit radio	Jive	
Japan	April 28, 1999	CD	Jive	
United Kingdom	May 3, 1999	CD; cassette	Jive	

== See also ==
- List of best-selling singles in Finland
- List of Billboard Adult Contemporary number ones of 1999
