= For the Fans =

For the Fans may refer to:

- For the Fans (Backstreet Boys album)
- For the Fans Vol. 1, a mini-album by Bizzy Bone
- For the Fans Tour, a concert tour by Gary Barlow
- For the Fans (TV network), the former Eleven Sports USA
- "For the Fans", a track from the soundtrack of the 2015 video game Undertale by Toby Fox
