= Let It Be Me =

Let It Be Me may refer to:

== Film and television ==
- Let It Be Me (1936 film), a Merrie Melodies short
- Let It Be Me (1995 film), a musical

== Music ==
- "Let It Be Me" (The Everly Brothers song), published in French in 1955 as "Je t'appartiens"
- "Let It Be Me" (Social Distortion song), 1990
- "Let It Be Me", a song by Jennifer Lopez on the album A.K.A.
- "Let It Be Me", a song by David Guetta featuring Ava Max on the album 7
- "Let It Be Me", a song by High Valley from Love Is a Long Road
- Let It Be Me (album), a 2008 album by Jason Donovan
- Let It Be Me: Mathis in Nashville, a 2010 album by Johnny Mathis
- "Let It Be Me", a 2019 song by Steve Aoki and the Backstreet Boys
