= The One (Backstreet Boys song) =

2000 single by Backstreet Boys

Single by Backstreet Boys

from the album Millennium
- Released: May 1, 2000
- Studio: Cherion, Polar (Stockholm, Sweden)
- Length: 3:46
- Label: Jive
- Songwriters: Max Martin; Brian Littrell
- Producers: Max Martin; Kristian Lundin

Backstreet Boys singles chronology
"Show Me the Meaning of Being Lonely" (1999)	"The One" (2000)	"Shape of My Heart" (2000)

Music video
- "The One" on YouTube

"The One" is a song by American boy band Backstreet Boys. It was released on May 1, 2000, as the fourth and final single from their third studio album, Millennium (1999). It reached the top 10 in Canada, Hungary, Portugal, Romania, Spain, and the United Kingdom, and it peaked at number 30 on the US Billboard Hot 100.

== Background ==
A sneak preview of the song was released on the Selections from A Night Out with the Backstreet Boys CD on November 17, 1998, and had a slightly different sound to it, while another preview was shown at the end of Britney Spears' album ...Baby One More Time (under the title "I'll Be the One") two months later.

In a 2001 interview on The View, the group stated they never really intended "The One" as their fourth single. The group held a poll on TRL allowing fans to choose the next single from their album, and after Nick Carter himself called in and voted for "The One," his large fan-base followed. The rest of the group had preferred the song "Don't Want You Back," leading in votes up to that point.

== Music video ==
=== Background ===
The music video was directed by Chris Hafner and Kevin Richardson in April 2000. Most of the video is in widescreen format, though the within letterboxed black area are pulses of color based on the brightness of the shots. The choruses mainly feature two different clips side-by-side, further letterboxing the video. During the breakdown before the final choruses, the standard letterboxed image is split horizontally into four segments, and different clips flash between them with camera flash effects on the borderlines.

=== Synopsis ===
The video opened with a dedication to the Boys' fans, crew, band, and dancers. The video itself begins with a time-lapse shot of Gainbridge Fieldhouse (then named Conseco Fieldhouse), home of the Indiana Pacers, being converted from a basketball court to the band's stage for the Into the Millennium Tour, which is reversed at the end of the video. The remainder of the video comprises clips of performance footage from the tour and, less notably, several panned still images and off-stage clips from behind the scenes or other promotional appearances done for Millennium.

The footage is not specifically related to "The One," though a few clips of the band are synced to the lyrics. A soundtrack of screaming fans was added to the song's album version to give a live feeling to the song. The concert footage was from the entire tour, including a concert in the Bryce Jordan Center and the basketball arena at Penn State University. The video also shows a segment of the Backstreet Boys playing basketball in Michigan State jerseys. This is because concert footage was also taken from when the band played the Jack Breslin Center.

== Track listings ==
UK CD single

1. "The One" (album version) – 3:46
2. "Show Me the Meaning of Being Lonely" (Soul Solution Mixshow edit) – 3:40
3. "Larger than Life" (Jack D. Elliot radio mix) – 3:50
4. "The One" (video)

UK cassette single and European CD single

1. "The One" (album version) – 3:46
2. "The One" (instrumental) – 3:46

European 7-inch single

A. "The One" (album version) – 3:46
B. "Larger than Life" (Jack D. Elliot radio mix) – 3:50

European and Australian maxi-CD single

1. "The One" (album version) – 3:46
2. "The One" (instrumental) – 3:46
3. "Show Me the Meaning of Being Lonely" (Soul Solution Mixshow edit) – 3:40
4. "Larger than Life" (Jack D. Elliot radio mix) – 3:50

Japanese CD single

1. "The One" (album version) – 3:46
2. "The One" (instrumental) – 3:46
3. "Show Me the Meaning of Being Lonely" (Soul Solution Mixshow edit) – 3:40
4. "Show Me the Meaning of Being Lonely" (Jason Nevins crossover remix) – 3:55
5. "Larger than Life" (Jack D. Elliot radio mix) – 3:50

== Charts ==
=== Weekly charts ===
Chart (2000–2001)	Peak position
Australia (ARIA)	41
Austria (Ö3 Austria Top 40)	25
Belgium (Ultratop 50 Flanders)	35
Belgium (Ultratip Bubbling Under Wallonia)	4
Canada Top Singles (RPM)	4
Canada Adult Contemporary (RPM)	10
Croatia (HRT)	5
Czech Republic (IFPI)	2
Estonia (Eesti Top 20)	13
Europe (Eurochart Hot 100)	19
Europe (European Hit Radio)	3
Finland (Suomen virallinen lista)	19
Finland Airplay (Radiosoittolista)	1
Germany (GfK)	15
Hungary (Mahasz)	3
Iceland (Íslenski Listinn Topp 40)	12
Ireland (IRMA)	19
Italy (FIMI)	10
Italy (Musica e dischi)	8
Italy Airplay (Music & Media)	5
Latvia (Latvijas Top 30)	7
Netherlands (Dutch Top 40)	17
Netherlands (Single Top 100)	21
New Zealand (Recorded Music NZ)	15
Portugal (AFP)	6
Romania (Romanian Top 100)	4
Scottish Singles Sales (Official Charts)	7
Spain (Promusicae)	9
Sweden (Sverigetopplistan)	25
Switzerland (Schweizer Hitparade)	19
UK Singles (Official Charts)	8
UK Airplay (Music Week)	11
UK Indie (Official Charts)	3
US Billboard Hot 100	30
US Adult Contemporary (Billboard)	15
US Pop Airplay (Billboard)	11
US Rhythmic Airplay (Billboard)	33

=== Year-end charts ===
Chart (2000)	Position
Europe (European Hit Radio)	30
Iceland (Íslenski Listinn Topp 40)	85
New Zealand (RIANZ)	40
Romania (Romanian Top 100)	44
UK Singles (OCC)	195
US Adult Contemporary (Billboard)	33
US Mainstream Top 40 (Billboard)	65

== Certifications ==
Region	Certification	Certified units/sales
Canada (Music Canada)	Gold	40,000^{‡}
^{‡} Sales+streaming figures based on certification alone.

== Release history ==
Region	Date	Format(s)	Label(s)	Ref(s).
United States	May 1–2, 2000	Rhythmic contemporary; contemporary hit radio	Jive	
United States	May 29, 2000	Adult contemporary; hot adult contemporary radio	Jive	
United Kingdom	June 12, 2000	CD; cassette	Jive	
Japan	July 5, 2000	CD	Jive	
