= Millennium (Backstreet Boys album) =

1999 studio album by Backstreet Boys

Studio album by Backstreet Boys
- Released: May 18, 1999
- Recorded: October 1998 – March 1999
- Studios: Battery (New York City, New York); Parc (Orlando, Florida); Cheiron & Polar (Stockholm, Sweden)
- Genre: Pop
- Length: 46:00; 144:00 (Millennium 2.0)
- Label: Jive
- Producers: Max Martin; Kristian Lundin; Rami Yacoub; Robert John "Mutt" Lange; Patrik "The Hitmaker" Lindqvist; Stephen Lipson; Mattias Gustafsson; Timmy Allen; Edwin "Tony" Nicholas; Eric Foster White

Backstreet Boys chronology
Backstreet Boys (1997)	Millennium (1999)	Black & Blue (2000)

Singles from Millennium
- 1. "I Want It That Way" Released: April 12, 1999; 2. "Larger than Life" Released: September 7, 1999; 3. "Show Me the Meaning of Being Lonely" Released: December 14, 1999; 4. "The One" Released: May 1, 2000

Millennium is the third studio album (second in the United States) and the first worldwide album by American vocal group Backstreet Boys. It was released on May 18, 1999, by Jive Records. It was a highly anticipated follow-up to both their American self-titled 1997 album and their second released album, Backstreet's Back (1997).

Millennium held the record for most shipments in one year, with 11 million shipments sold in the United States in 1999. It was nominated for five Grammy Awards and became one of the best-selling albums of all time, selling 24 million copies worldwide. The Backstreet Boys promoted Millennium through the Into the Millennium Tour, which became one of the fastest-grossing tours ever.

== Background ==
Following the release of their 1997 albums Backstreet's Back and Backstreet Boys selling a combined 27 million copies worldwide, the Backstreet Boys were met with critics accusing them of being a "flash in the pan" and misconceptions that they earned a lot of money. From 1997 to 1998, the band filed a lawsuit against manager Lou Pearlman, stating that they only received $300,000 from recording and touring while he kept over $10 million. Pearlman claimed to be the "sixth Backstreet Boy" and revealed to them that he managed rival boy band NSYNC, who sold over 6 million copies of their debut album, stating that "it's business." On September 18, 1998, the band left their management company Wright Stuff, which was formerly associated with Pearlman's record company Trans Continental Records.

During the same period, the band also dealt with personal tragedies; Kevin Richardson suffered two family deaths, Brian Littrell needed to undergo open heart surgery, Howie Dorough lost his sister from lupus, and the band's producer Denniz Pop died of stomach cancer. The album was initially titled Larger Than Life, which Dorough described as "almost like a thank-you song for all they've done" because they always supported the band.

On July 11, 2025, a Millennium 2.0 remastered album commemorating the 25th anniversary was released, which included 13 extra tracks, including an alternative version of their hit song, “I Want It That Way.”

== Promotion ==
Every version of Britney Spears' debut album ...Baby One More Time that was released before Millennium contained previews of three songs as hidden tracks, placed at the end of the album against Spears' wishes. The band appeared on Saturday Night Live and Total Request Live during the album's release date, and filmed a Disney Channel concert special called Backstreet Boys in Concert the same day.

=== Singles ===
Four singles were released from the album:

- "I Want It That Way" is the lead single from the album, released on April 12, 1999. It is one of the Backstreet Boys' most commercially successful songs and is often regarded as the group's signature song.
- "Larger than Life" is the second single, released on September 7, 1999.
- "Show Me the Meaning of Being Lonely" is the third single, released on December 14, 1999. It peaked at number six on the Billboard Hot 100 during the week of March 18, 2000.
- "The One" is the fourth and final single from the album, being released on May 1, 2000. "Don't Want You Back" was originally going to be the fourth single based on a TRL fan vote. However, when Nick Carter called in to vote for "The One," the fans followed after him.

=== Tour ===
The album's supporting tour, Into the Millennium Tour, started on June 2, 1999, and ended on March 15, 2000, with a total of 123 shows in 84 cities spanning three legs. Their concert at the Georgia Dome in Atlanta, was the fifth most attended concert in American history, and the most attended concert by a pop artist.

== Critical reception ==
Professional ratings
Review scores
Source	Rating
AllMusic	4/5 stars
Christgau's Consumer Guide	(2-star Honorable Mention)
Entertainment Weekly	B−
MTV Asia	1/10
Rolling Stone	3/5 stars
The Rolling Stone Album Guide	3.5/5 stars
Spin	7/10

Writing for AllMusic, Stephen Thomas Erlewine wrote that "Millennium has no pretense of being anything other than an album for the moment, delivering more of everything that made Backstreet's Back a blockbuster." Robert Christgau gave Millennium a two-star honorable mention, stating that the album is "softening it a little up for their younger demographic, sexing it up a little for their own peace of mind," specifically praising "I Want It That Way" and "Larger than Life." Jim Farber of Entertainment Weekly gave the album a B−, stating that they have taken risks in their lyrics, as "Teen acts normally can’t acknowledge their romantic power. They have to remain the longing ones in order to seal the twin fantasies of purity and accessibility".

Arion Berger of Rolling Stone commented that the album was "prefabricated, too pretty, suspiciously well-choreographed", criticizing Nick Carter's straining vocals on "I Need You Tonight," calling "It's Gotta Be You" a rehash of their 1997 single "Everybody (Backstreet's Back)", and describing "The Perfect Fan" as bland. However, he praised "Show Me the Meaning of Being Lonely," describing it as "digging its melodic claws into your skull on the first listen [...] it's the swooniest blending of the five vocalists' timbres to date, and mighty pretty besides". Writing for Spin, Joshua Clover criticized the opening track "Larger than Life," stating that it "boogies deftly and punks daftly [...] but huffs fame like glue", while praising other uptempo songs such as "I Want It That Way," "Don't Want You Back," "It's Gotta Be You," and "Spanish Eyes". He concluded by stating that while "the calendar flipping soundtrack" isn't Robbie Williams' song "Millennium" (1998), it 'smashes Silverchair's "Anthem for the Year 2000"' (1999), comparing the band more to Alanis Morissette than NSYNC.

== Commercial performance ==
Millennium debuted at number one on the Billboard 200, where it remained for 10 non-consecutive weeks. It sold 1,134,000 copies in its first week of release, breaking the previous Nielsen SoundScan record of 1.09 million copies held by Garth Brooks' Double Live for single-week record sales. This record was subsequently overtaken in 2000 by NSYNC with the release of No Strings Attached. Millennium sold nearly 500,000 copies in the US on its first day alone, setting a record for first-day sales, and became the best-selling album of 1999, selling 9,445,732 albums. It remained on the Billboard chart for 93 weeks, eventually selling over 13 million copies in the United States and being certified 13 times platinum.

As of 2023, the album stands as the sixth best-selling album in the United States of the SoundScan era with 12.3 million units sold. In 2003 it was also reported as being the fourth biggest seller for Music Club sales in the US over the past 14 years with sales of 1.59 million, though these sales are not included in SoundScan's total. In Canada, Millennium was the seventh biggest selling album since 1995 in the Canadian Soundscan sales era up to end of December 2007, while in Japan, sales reached 1 million according to Billboard. In 2015, Millennium became one of the best-selling albums of all time, selling 24 million copies worldwide.

The album topped the European Albums Chart for four consecutive weeks.

=== Millennium 2.0 ===
After the July 2025 release of Millennium 2.0, celebrating the album's twenty-fifth anniversary, it charted on a number of charts; in the US, Millennium 2.0 peaked at number 10 on the US iTunes albums chart. In the United Kingdom, the album placed at number 23 on the UK Albums Sales chart, at number 15 on the UK Albums Downloads chart, and at number 29 on the UK Physical Albums Chart. The album additionally placed at number 60 on the Scottish Albums chart. Millennium 2.0 also charted in an additional four countries: Hungary, Japan, Poland, and Spain.

== Track listing ==
Standard edition
No.	Title	Writer(s)	Producer(s)	Length
1.	"Larger than Life"	Brian Littrell; Max Martin; Kristian Lundin	Martin; Lundin; Rami Yacoub	3:52
2.	"I Want It That Way"	Andreas Carlsson; Martin	Martin; Lundin	3:33
3.	"Show Me the Meaning of Being Lonely"	Herbert Crichlow; Martin	Martin; Lundin	3:56
4.	"It's Gotta Be You"	Robert John "Mutt" Lange; Martin	Yacoub; Martin; Lange	2:57
5.	"I Need You Tonight"	Andrew Fromm	Lange	4:23
6.	"Don't Want You Back"	Martin	Martin; Yacoub	3:26
7.	"Don't Wanna Lose You Now"	Martin	Martin; Yacoub	3:55
8.	"The One"	Martin; Littrell	Martin; Lundin	3:46
9.	"Back to Your Heart"	Kevin Richardson; Gary Baker; Jason Blume; Jerry Allan Williams; Littrell	Stephen Lipson; Timmy Allen^{[a]}	4:21
10.	"Spanish Eyes"	Andrew Fromm; Sandy Linzer	Mattias Gustafsson; Allen	3:55
11.	"No One Else Comes Close"	Joe Thomas; Wayne Perry; Baker	Edwin "Tony" Nicholas; Allen	3:43
12.	"The Perfect Fan"	Thomas Smith; Littrell	Eric Foster White	4:15
Total length:				46:00

Australia / Japan: bonus tracks
No.	Title	Writer(s)	Producer(s)	Length
13.	"I'll Be There for You"	Wayne Perry; Gary Baker; Timmy Allen	Timmy Allen; Larry “Rock” Campbell	4:37
14.	"You Wrote the Book on Love"	Gary Baker; Wayne Perry; Butch Johnson	“Fitz” Gerald Scott	4:38

Millennium 2.0: bonus CD
No.	Title	Writer(s)	Producer(s)	Length
1.	"Hey"	Michael J. Ade; Daniel Weber; Andy Grammer; Ian Kirkpatrick	Ade; Weber	3:26
2.	"I'll Be There for You"	Perry; Baker; Allen	Allen; Campbell	4:33
3.	"You Wrote the Book on Love"	Perry; Baker; Johnson	Scott	4:38
4.	"If You Knew What I Knew"	Billy Chapin; Brian Bennett; AJ McLean	Chapin; Bennett; McLean	4:13
5.	"My Heart Stays with You"	Full Force	Full Force	3:37
6.	"I Want It That Way" (alternate lyrics)	Carlsson; Martin; Lange	Martin; Lundin	3:34
7.	"The Perfect Fan" (demo)	Smith; Littrell	Littrell	4:36
8.	"Larger Than Life" (live at the Conseco Fieldhouse)	Martin; Lundin; Littrell		3:57
9.	"Don't Wanna Lose You Now" (live at the Conseco Fieldhouse)	Martin		3:50
10.	"I Want It That Way" (live at the Conseco Fieldhouse)	Carlsson; Martin		4:13
11.	"Don't Want You Back" (live at the Conseco Fieldhouse)	Martin		3:46
12.	"The One" (live at the Conseco Fieldhouse)	Martin; Littrell		4:01
13.	"Show Me the Meaning of Being Lonely" (live at the Conseco Fieldhouse)	Crichlow; Martin		5:45
Total length:				1:44:00

Notes

- ^{^[a]} signifies additional vocal production

== Personnel ==
Credits for Millennium adapted from AllMusic and album's liner notes.

Backstreet Boys

- Nick Carter (tenor/baritone) – vocals, additional vocal arrangements (track 7)
- Brian Littrell – (tenor/falsetto) vocals, additional vocal arrangements (track 4), BSB vocal arrangements and choir conducting (track 12)
- Kevin Richardson (baritone) – vocals; additional vocal arrangements, musical arrangements, keyboards, and bass (track 9)
- Howie Dorough – (tenor/falsetto) vocals
- AJ McLean – (baritone) vocals, additional vocal arrangements (track 4)

Additional musicians

- Hans Åkeson – viola (track 3)
- Tomas Andersson – violin (track 3)
- Torbjörn Bernhardsson – viola (track 3)
- Randy Bowland – guitar (track 11), acoustic guitar (track 12)
- Asa Forsberg – cello (track 3)
- Ulf Forsberg – viola (track 3)
- Andrew Fromm – piano (track 5)
- Ben Glynne – programming (track 9)
- Mattias Gustafsson – drum programming, bass, keyboards, and guitars (track 10)
- Hart Hollman & The Motown Romance – orchestra (track 12)
- Henrik Janson – string arrangements and conducting (track 3)
- Uli Janson – string arrangements and conducting (track 3)
- Bashiri Johnson – percussion (track 10)
- Michael Karlsson – double bass (track 3)
- Tomas Lindberg – bass (tracks 2, 3)
- Stephen Lipson – programming (track 9)
- Annette Mannheimer – violin (track 3)
- Svein H. Martinsen – viola (track 3)
- Dominic Miller – guitar (track 9)
- Chieli Minucci – acoustic and electric guitars (track 5)
- Edwin "Tony" Nicholas – drum programming, bass, and keyboards (track 11)
- Esbjörn Öhrwall – guitar (tracks 1–3, 7, 8)
- Samuli Örnstromer – cello (track 3)
- Åsa Stove Paulsson – viola (track 3)
- Doug Petty – piano (track 12)
- Elisabeth Arnberg Ranmo – viola (track 3)
- Olle Romo – keyboards and programming (track 5)
- Monika Stanikoliska – violin (track 3)
- Tates Creek High School Choir – vocals (track 12)

Shannon Anderson, Nancy Baker, Jarred Baugh, Stephen Booth, Leslie Carter, Christina Craddock, Nicholas Daley, Nathan Day, Andrea Dicks, Sean Flaherty, Michael Brad Frazier, Lori Gerlach, Eli Griggs, Noel Harilson, Missy Hogue, Misty Ingels, Jason Jackson, Justin Kearns, Eschelle King, Ryan Kociatek, Toeupu Liu, Rachel Livingston, Rebecca Lord, Kyle Lugger, Ken Mars, Chuck McKenney, Lauren Moss, Charisa Owens, Scott Phillips, Jonathan Prewitt, Merica Rawlings, Luke Sink, Andrea Smith, Beth Smith, Steven Smith, Terri Snider, Heather Tirey, Beth Tober, Mary Trumbo, Patricia Twitty, Cristin Walter, Tasha Webb, Joseph Wells, Ryan West, Shea Popa Wood, Jennifer Schindler

- Peter-John Vettese – additional keyboards and programming (track 9)
- Jojje Wadenius – guitar (track 3)
- Eric Foster White – bass, electric guitar, keyboards, string orchestration and conducting (track 12)
- Dan Wojeciechowski – drums (track 12)

Technical

- Adam Barber – engineer (tracks 10, 11), additional vocal engineer (track 9)
- John Bates – choir engineer (track 12)
- Adam Blackburn – choir engineer (track 12)
- Daniel Boom – engineer (track 4)
- Tom Coyne – mastering
- Stephen George – basic track engineer and BSB vocal engineer (track 12)
- Mick Guzauski – mixing (track 12)
- Devon Kirkpatrick – assistant engineer (track 12)
- Kristian Lundin – engineering and mixing (tracks 1–3, 8)
- Max Martin – engineering and mixing (tracks 1–4, 6–8)
- Heff Moraes – engineering and mixing (track 9)
- Rami – engineering and mixing (tracks 4, 6, 7)
- Bo Reimer – additional engineering (track 3), vocal engineer (track 8)
- Dawn Reinholtz – assistant engineer (track 12)
- Carl Robinson – orchestra engineer (track 12)
- Olle Romo – Pro-Tools (track 5)
- George Spatta – engineer (track 5)
- Chris Trevett – engineering and mixing (tracks 5, 10, 11)
- Eric Foster White – basic track engineer (track 12)

Design

- Elan Bongiorno – hair stylist, make-up
- Catherine Furniss – hair stylist, make-up
- Nick Gamma – art direction, design
- Hayley Hill – stylist
- Charles Infante – set design
- Jackie Murphy – art direction, design
- Chris Resig – photography
- Rachel Zoe Rosenzweig – stylist
- Leeza Taylor – photography

== Charts ==
=== Weekly charts ===
Weekly chart performance for Millennium
Chart (1999)	Peak position
Australian Albums (ARIA)	2
Austrian Albums (Ö3 Austria)	1
Belgian Albums (Ultratop Flanders)	1
Belgian Albums (Ultratop Wallonia)	2
Canadian Albums (Billboard)	1
Czech Albums (IFPI CR)	7
Danish Albums (Hitlisten)	1
Dutch Albums (Album Top 100)	1
Estonian Albums (Eesti Top 10)	1
European Albums Chart	1
Finnish Albums (Suomen virallinen lista)	1
French Albums (SNEP)	8
German Albums (Offizielle Top 100)	1
Greek Albums (IFPI)	1
Hungarian Albums (MAHASZ)	2
Icelandic Albums (Tonlist)	1
Irish Albums (IRMA)	2
Italian Albums (FIMI)	1
Italian Albums (Musica e Dischi)	2
Japanese Albums (Oricon)	6
Malaysian Albums (RIM)	1
New Zealand Albums (RMNZ)	1
Norwegian Albums (VG-lista)	1
Portuguese Albums (AFP)	1
Scottish Albums (Official Charts)	4
Singapore Albums (SPVA)	5
Spanish Albums (PROMUSICAE)	1
Swedish Albums (Sverigetopplistan)	1
Swiss Albums (Schweizer Hitparade)	1
Taiwanese Albums (IFPI)	1
UK Albums (Official Charts)	2
US Billboard 200	1

Chart (2025–2026)	Peak position
German Pop Albums (Offizielle Top 100)	5
Greek Albums (IFPI)	62

Weekly chart performance for Millennium 2.0
Chart (2025)	Peak position
Hungarian Physical Albums (MAHASZ)	29
Japanese Albums (Oricon)	25
Polish Albums (ZPAV)	89
Spanish Albums (PROMUSICAE)	26
UK Albums Downloads	15
UK Albums Sales	23
UK Physical Albums	29

=== Year-end charts ===
Year-end chart performance for Millennium in 1999
Chart (1999)	Position
Australian Albums (ARIA)	11
Austrian Albums (Ö3 Austria)	9
Belgian Albums (Ultratop Flanders)	12
Belgian Albums (Ultratop Wallonia)	22
Canadian Top Albums/CDs (RPM)	1
Danish Albums (Hitlisten)	11
Dutch Albums (Album Top 100)	10
European Albums (Music & Media)	7
German Albums (Offizielle Top 100)	5
Italian Albums (Musica e dischi)	16
New Zealand Albums (RMNZ)	19
Norwegian Spring Period Albums (VG-lista)	9
Spanish Albums (PROMUSICAE)	7
Swiss Albums (Schweizer Hitparade)	12
UK Albums (OCC)	37
US Billboard 200	1

Year-end chart performance for Millennium in 2000
Chart (2000)	Position
Canadian Albums (Nielsen SoundScan)	42
German Albums (Offizielle Top 100)	89
Swiss Albums (Schweizer Hitparade)	100
UK Albums (OCC)	91
US Billboard 200	9

=== Decade-end charts ===
Decade-end chart performance for Millennium from 1990 to 1999
Chart (1990–1999)	Position
US Billboard 200	16

== Certifications and sales ==
Certifications and sales for Millennium
Region	Certification	Certified units/sales
Argentina (CAPIF)	3× Platinum	180,000^{^}
Australia (ARIA)	3× Platinum	210,000^{^}
Austria (IFPI Austria)	Gold	25,000^{*}
Belgium (BRMA)	2× Platinum	100,000^{*}
Brazil (Pro-Música Brasil)	2× Platinum	600,000
Canada (Music Canada)	Diamond	1,075,000
Chile (IFPI)	—	57,665
Colombia	Gold	30,000
Denmark (IFPI Danmark)	Platinum	50,000^{^}
Finland (Musiikkituottajat)	Platinum	42,525
Germany (BVMI)	3× Gold	750,000^{^}
Iceland	—	3,000
Italy	—	300,000
Japan (RIAJ)	4× Platinum	1,000,000
Mexico (AMPROFON)	4× Platinum+Gold	675,000^{^}
Netherlands (NVPI)	2× Platinum	200,000^{^}
New Zealand (RMNZ)	2× Platinum	30,000^{^}
Norway (IFPI Norway)	Platinum	65,000
Poland (ZPAV)	Gold	50,000^{*}
Singapore (SPVA)	2× Platinum	30,000
South Korea (KMCA)	4× Platinum	250,000
Spain (Promusicae)	4× Platinum	400,000^{^}
Sweden (GLF)	Platinum	80,000^{^}
Switzerland (IFPI Switzerland)	Platinum	50,000^{^}
Thailand	—	130,000
United Kingdom (BPI)	Platinum	487,542
United States (RIAA)	13× Platinum	15,402,000 (Note: As of March 2015, the album has sold 13,812,000 copies in the US according to Nielsen SoundScan, which does not count albums sold through clubs like the BMG Music Club, where it sold 1.59 million units as of February 2003. Combined, it has sold over 15,402,000 copies in the United States.)
Summaries
Europe (IFPI)	2× Platinum	2,000,000^{*}
Worldwide	—	24,000,000
^{*} Sales figures based on certification alone.^{^} Shipments figures based on certification alone.

== See also ==
- List of best-selling albums
- List of fastest-selling albums
- List of best-selling albums in Brazil
- List of best-selling albums in Canada
- List of best-selling albums in the United States
