= Andrew Fromm =

- Origin: Nashville, Tennessee
- Genres: Pop, rock, R&B, dance, theatre, country
- Occupations: Songwriter (lyric and melody)

Andrew Fromm is a songwriter from Edison, New Jersey, currently living in Franklin, Tennessee in the Nashville area. He is married to Beth Hood and they have a son, Hudson (born in 2012); and a daughter Isla (born in 2020).

== Career ==
Andrew Fromm is a successful songwriter living in the Nashville area who has written songs for the Backstreet Boys, Marc Anthony, Westlife, Kristine W, OPM, 2Gether, Soluna, Nobody's Angel, Judith Lefeber, Christian Bautista, Nikki Webster, C21, Hiromi Go and many others.

After appearing on the final season of Ed McMahon's Star Search where he played the original song "I Need You Tonight", his song landed on the Backstreet Boys 1999 release, "Millennium" which sold approximately 40 million albums worldwide (13 million RIAA certified in the USA) with 5 Grammy nominations. He also added the song "Spanish Eyes" to that album which he co-wrote with his songwriter cousin, Sandy Linzer.

== Selected discography ==
- Backstreet Boys "I Need You Tonight"
- Backstreet Boys "Spanish Eyes"
- Backstreet Boys "How Did I Fall in Love with You?"
