= Everybody (Backstreet's Back) =

1997 single by Backstreet Boys

Single by Backstreet Boys

from the album Backstreet's Back and Backstreet Boys (US)
- B-side: "Boys Will Be Boys"; "Anywhere for You"
- Released: July 14, 1997
- Studio: Cheiron (Stockholm, Sweden); Parc (Orlando, Florida)
- Genre: Dance-pop
- Length: 4:45 (extended version); 3:45 (radio edit)
- Label: Jive
- Songwriters: Denniz Pop; Max Martin
- Producers: Denniz Pop; Max Martin

Backstreet Boys singles chronology
"Anywhere for You" (1997)	"Everybody (Backstreet's Back)" (1997)	"As Long as You Love Me" (1997)

Backstreet Boys US singles chronology
"As Long as You Love Me" (1997)	"Everybody (Backstreet's Back)" (1998)	"I'll Never Break Your Heart" (1998)

Alternate cover

Music video
- "Everybody (Backstreet's Back)" on YouTube

"Everybody (Backstreet's Back)" is a song by American boy band Backstreet Boys, written and produced by Denniz Pop and Max Martin. It was released as the first single from the band's second international studio album Backstreet's Back in July 1997 by Jive Records, and the third single from their self-titled debut US studio album. It became a worldwide success, peaking at number four on the US Billboard Hot 100, with 22 weeks on the chart, and number three on the UK Singles Chart. The accompanying music video was directed by Joseph Kahn, featuring the band members inside a haunted mansion. The band performed the song at the end of the 2013 film This Is the End.

== Background and release ==
Zomba chairman Clive Calder suggested that "Everybody (Backstreet's Back)" should be released as a single, which was met with resistance from Jive Records president Barry Weiss, as he believed that it would be weird to have a song called "Backstreet's Back" on the Backstreet Boys' first US album. The band suggested it could just mean that they were back home. After Canadian markets began playing the song, US markets near the border began picking the song up. They met with Weiss and asked that the song be added to the US album after the first million units had already been produced. There are two versions of the song. The international album features the album or 7-inch version, which is the standard recording. The US album features the song's extended version, which includes an extended breakdown section but cuts the bridge. The music video for the song was cut to both versions, with the extended video released to the US market and the standard video released everywhere else.

== Critical reception ==
Larry Flick from Billboard stated that "Everybody (Backstreet's Back)" contained a "contagious dance/pop beat and catchy hook that perfectly showcases this talented group's voices". British magazine Music Week gave the song four out of five, adding that "the boys turn up the power on a strutting, soulful anthem, which will be one of the summer's bigger successes." Music Week editor Alan Jones noted that Backstreet Boys "state the obvious" in the song, "but they do it with a certain amount of style. The mid-tempo piece is instantly assimilated and well-sung, primarily as a group effort. Another major hit is guaranteed."

== Commercial performance ==
Written and produced by Max Martin and Denniz Pop, "Everybody (Backstreet's Back)" is one of the Backstreet Boys' most successful singles to date. It reached number four on the Billboard Hot 100 in the United States—the band's second top-ten single in the country following "Quit Playing Games (with My Heart)"—and spent 22 weeks on the chart, and number three on the UK Singles Chart. It is certified platinum in the US.

== Music video ==
=== Background ===
The music video for "Everybody" was directed by American director Joseph Kahn and filmed in Los Angeles, California, from June 16–18, 1997. Jive contacted Kahn to direct a project with a "white Jodeci." Initially unaware of who the Backstreet Boys were, he was shocked by the group's European sales figures after being given a cassette tape and publicity release about them. Initially known as a director for mostly hip-hop music videos, he wanted to explore the pop genre since he grew up listening to music from the 1980s.

The haunted house aesthetic was based on a treatment Kahn envisioned for rapper Ice Cube a few months prior and was inspired by the music video for Michael Jackson's "Thriller." Kahn and the group wanted Antonio Fargas to portray the bus driver, as they were fans of Starsky & Hutch. The video shoot lasted 36 hours, with Nick Carter's mummy shot being filmed last. Jive did not get behind the concept of the band in costumes or the $1 million requirements and did not believe MTV would respect the video. The band ultimately had to put up their own money to shoot the video and fight with the label to get reimbursed once it was successful. The video premiered outside the United States in July 1997, although viewers with MuchMusic USA were able to see it as, at the time, it was still mostly a simulcast of the Canadian channel. In a 2017 interview with Billboard, Kahn stated that the video's impact broadened his view of pop culture while creating a new scene in the US.

=== Synopsis ===
The aesthetic of the haunted house was inspired by Michael Jackson's "Thriller" music video.

The video is bookended by scenes framing the context. When the Backstreet Boys' tour bus breaks down (for the second time on their unspecified tour, as Nick Carter complains), Brian Littrell laments potentially being unable to make it to their next show, while Howie Dorough attempts to contact their management team about the issue. Despite the group members' objections, their bus driver Steve (Antonio Fargas) insists that they spend a night at a nearby haunted mansion while he gets help. Littrell then prepares to sleep in one of the bedrooms; while in bed, he pulls out a scary animal from under his covers, making him scream in horror. The musical portion of the video then starts, playing as a dream sequence in which each band member appears as a different movie monster: Littrell as a werewolf; Dorough as Dracula; Carter as a mummy; AJ McLean as Erik, the Phantom of the Opera; and Kevin Richardson as both Dr. Jekyll and Mr. Hyde in a half-transformed Two-Face-like state. Throughout the beginning and middle of the song, the band, as monsters, mainly appear in their vignettes related to their character; during the final chorus, they collectively appear in the mansion's foyer with a Casper vibe, performing a dance routine with a group of additional dancers. Supermodel Josie Maran appears as Dorough's companion in his vignette, presumably portraying Mina Harker. While Anna Gunn is alleged to have appeared in the video, it's actually dancer Melissa Dishell. At the end of the video, Littrell wakes up realizing everything was a nightmare. He talks with the members about his dream, all stating they had similar dreams while trying to leave the house. However, Steve shows up, now a Frankenstein-esque monster, making the boys scream in horror.

There are two video cuts, one for the US market and one for the international market, each of which features the edit of the song released on the album for that market. The global video cuts from the opening bookend to the first verse. The bridge of the song is intact, and the first half of the dance routine, a ballroom dance portion, is intercut with the vignettes under it. This leads into the second half of the dance portion during the final choruses of the song, which are not intercut with the vignettes. In the US cut, the ballroom half of the dance routine and the beginning of the second half are used at the start of the song during the first rhythm-only breakdown and are not intercut with the vignettes. The second breakdown, which replaces the bridge, is accompanied only by shots from the vignettes, along with some shots of Littrell tumbling in the foyer and the various vignettes. When the final chorus begins, the second half of the dance routine is shown again from the start but is intercut with vignette scenes. Most of the remainder of the video is cut identically, other than several minor instances of alternate scenes or takes being used. The dance floor in the video was painted by an art director brought on to also paint a huge portrait of the boys as vampires.

== Awards and nominations ==
Award ceremony	Year	Category	Result	Ref.
MTV Video Music Awards	1998	Best Group Video	Won	
MTV Video Music Awards	1998	Best Dance Video	Nominated	
MuchMusic Video Awards	1998	Peoples Choice Favorite International Group	Won	
Nickelodeon Kids' Choice Awards	1999	Favorite Song	Won	

== Track listings ==
- US enhanced CD single
1. "Everybody (Backstreet's Back)" (radio edit) – 3:45
2. "Everybody (Backstreet's Back)" (Matty's radio mix) – 3:55
3. "Everybody (Backstreet's Back)" (remix video)
- US enhanced maxi-single
1. "Everybody (Backstreet's Back)" (Matty's radio mix) – 3:55
2. "Everybody (Backstreet's Back)" (Multiman remix) – 4:08
3. "Everybody (Backstreet's Back)" (Sharp London vocal mix) – 7:58
4. "Everybody (Backstreet's Back)" (radio edit) – 3:45
5. "Everybody (Backstreet's Back)" (extended version) – 4:45
6. "Everybody (Backstreet's Back)" (remix video)
- US 12-inch single

A1. "Everybody (Backstreet's Back)" (extended radio mix) – 4:45
A2. "Everybody (Backstreet's Back)" (Matty's hip hop radio remix) – 3:55
A3. "Everybody (Backstreet's Back)" (Kano's Undercurrent dub) – 7:11
B1. "Everybody (Backstreet's Back)" (Sharp London vocal remix) – 7:58
B2. "Everybody (Backstreet's Back)" (Sharp Trade dub) – 8:55

- Canadian CD single
1. "Everybody (Backstreet's Back)" (7-inch version) – 3:44
2. "Everybody (Backstreet's Back)" (extended version) – 4:45
3. "Boys Will Be Boys" – 4:05
4. "Anywhere for You" – 4:40
- UK and European CD single
1. "Everybody (Backstreet's Back)" (7-inch version) – 3:44
2. "Everybody (Backstreet's Back)" (extended version) – 4:45
3. "Everybody (Backstreet's Back)" (MultiMan remix) – 4:09
4. "Everybody (Backstreet's Back)" (Matty's remix) – 3:55
5. "Everybody (Backstreet's Back)" (Max & Macario club mix) – 6:12
- UK CD single digipak
1. "Everybody (Backstreet's Back)" (7-inch version) – 3:44
2. "Everybody (Backstreet's Back)" (extended version) – 4:45
3. "Boys Will Be Boys" – 4:05

== Charts ==
=== Weekly charts ===
Chart (1997–1998)	Peak position
Australia (ARIA)	3
Austria (Ö3 Austria Top 40)	2
Belgium (Ultratop 50 Flanders)	5
Belgium (Ultratop 50 Wallonia)	5
Canada (Nielsen SoundScan)	2
Canada Top Singles (RPM)	3
Canada Adult Contemporary (RPM)	2
Canada Dance/Urban (RPM)	5
Costa Rica (El Siglo de Torreón)	2
Denmark (IFPI)	3
Estonia (Eesti Top 20)	10
Estonia Airplay (Eesti Top 25)	1
Europe (Eurochart Hot 100)	2
Europe (European Hit Radio)	4
Finland (Suomen virallinen lista)	4
Finland Airplay (Radiosoittolista)	7
France (SNEP)	26
France Airplay (SNEP)	11
Germany (GfK)	2
Hungary (Mahasz)	1
Iceland (Íslenski Listinn Topp 40)	19
Ireland (IRMA)	10
Israel (Israeli Singles Chart)	2
Italy (FIMI)	5
Italy (Musica e dischi)	9
Italy Airplay (Music & Media)	4
Latvia (Latvijas Top 20)	1
Netherlands (Dutch Top 40)	4
Netherlands (Single Top 100)	5
New Zealand (Recorded Music NZ)	6
Norway (VG-lista)	4
Romania (Romanian Top 100)	1
Scottish Singles Sales (Official Charts)	4
Spain (AFYVE)	1
Spain Airplay (Top 40 Radio)	1
Sweden (Sverigetopplistan)	4
Switzerland (Schweizer Hitparade)	2
UK Singles (Official Charts)	3
UK Airplay (Music Week)	13
UK Indie (Music Week)	1
US Billboard Hot 100	4
US Pop Airplay (Billboard)	11
US Rhythmic Airplay (Billboard)	14

Chart (2023–2025)	Peak position
Iceland (Tónlistinn)	13
Kazakhstan Airplay (TopHit)	55
Poland (Polish Airplay Top 100)	68

=== Monthly charts ===
Chart (2024)	Peak position
Kazakhstan Airplay (TopHit)	79

=== Year-end charts ===
Chart (1997)	Position
Australia (ARIA)	26
Austria (Ö3 Austria Top 40)	16
Belgium (Ultratop 50 Flanders)	50
Belgium (Ultratop 50 Wallonia)	19
Canada Top Singles (RPM)	39
Canada Adult Contemporary (RPM)	23
Europe (Eurochart Hot 100)	25
Europe (European Hit Radio)	17
France (SNEP)	86
Germany (Media Control)	21
Israel (Israeli Singles Chart)	10
Italy (Musica e dischi)	45
Latvia (Latvijas Top 50)	3
Netherlands (Dutch Top 40)	31
Netherlands (Single Top 100)	21
New Zealand (RIANZ)	26
Romania (Romanian Top 100)	6
Sweden (Topplistan)	46
Switzerland (Schweizer Hitparade)	19
UK Singles (OCC)	38

Chart (1998)	Position
Brazil (Crowley)	91
US Billboard Hot 100	22
US Mainstream Top 40 (Billboard)	35
US Maxi-Singles Sales (Billboard)	5
US Rhythmic Top 40 (Billboard)	54

Chart (1999)	Position
US Maxi-Singles Sales (Billboard)	41

Chart (2024)	Position
Kazakhstan Airplay (TopHit)	162

== Certifications ==
Region	Certification	Certified units/sales
Australia (ARIA)	4× Platinum	280,000^{‡}
Belgium (BRMA)	Gold	25,000^{*}
Brazil (Pro-Música Brasil)	Platinum	60,000^{‡}
Denmark (IFPI Danmark)	Platinum	90,000^{‡}
France (SNEP)	Silver	125,000^{*}
Germany (BVMI)	Platinum	500,000^{‡}
Italy (FIMI)	Gold	50,000^{‡}
New Zealand (RMNZ)	3× Platinum	90,000^{‡}
Spain (Promusicae)	Platinum	60,000^{‡}
Sweden (GLF)	Gold	15,000^{^}
United Kingdom (BPI)	2× Platinum	1,200,000^{‡}
United States (RIAA)	Platinum	1,200,000
^{*} Sales figures based on certification alone.^{^} Shipments figures based on certification alone.^{‡} Sales+streaming figures based on certification alone.

== Release history ==
Region	Date	Format(s)	Label(s)	Ref.
Europe	July 14, 1997	CD	Jive	
Japan	August 1, 1997	CD	Jive; Avex Trax	
