= As Long as You Love Me (Backstreet Boys song) =

1997 single by Backstreet Boys

Single by Backstreet Boys

from the album Backstreet's Back and Backstreet Boys (US)
- B-side: "Every Time I Close My Eyes"
- Released: September 29, 1997
- Studio: Parc (Orlando, Florida); Cheiron (Stockholm, Sweden)
- Length: 3:40 (album version); 3:32 (radio version)
- Label: Jive
- Songwriter: Max Martin
- Producers: Max Martin; Kristian Lundin

Backstreet Boys singles chronology
"Everybody (Backstreet's Back)" (1997)	"As Long as You Love Me" (1997)	"All I Have to Give" (1998)

Backstreet Boys US singles chronology
"Quit Playing Games (with My Heart)" (1997)	"As Long as You Love Me" (1997)	"Everybody (Backstreet's Back)" (1998)

Music video
- "As Long as You Love Me" on YouTube

"As Long as You Love Me" is a song by American boy band Backstreet Boys, from the group's eponymous debut studio album in the United States, Backstreet Boys (1997), and their second studio album worldwide, Backstreet's Back (1997). The song was written by Max Martin, who produced it with Kristian Lundin, and lyrically describes the reciprocity of a relationship. It was released to radio by Jive Records as the second single from both albums in the United Kingdom on September 29, 1997, and in the United States on October 7, 1997.

"As Long as You Love Me" received positive reviews from music critics, who praised the production. It topped the charts in Lithuania, New Zealand, the Philippines, and Romania and peaked at number two in Australia and Austria, number three in Canada and the United Kingdom, number four in Switzerland and Sweden, and number five in the Netherlands and Norway. The accompanying music video was directed by Nigel Dick and depicts the Backstreet Boys performing an audition for six women.

== Background ==
In an interview with Billboard, AJ McLean noted that he was initially meant to sing the song's bridge, while Brian Littrell and Nick Carter would both sing the verses. However, he had been infected with strep throat and was replaced with Littrell, whose vocals were featured on the album and single. The song was a last-minute addition to the album Backstreet Boys released in the United States and Backstreet's Back released internationally, as Clive Calder, then-chairman of Zomba, heard the song and called Jive Records president Barry Weiss, who then contacted the band's manager, Johnny Wright.

== Critical reception ==
Stephen Thomas Erlewine from AllMusic stated that "As Long as You Love Me" "would have sounded perfect in any era". He also praised the song's slick production, which he described "as irresistible as teen pop can be". John Dingwall from Daily Record stated that the song reminded him of "the 90s New Kids on the Block". A reviewer from Music Week gave it a score of four out of five, writing, "This bears many similarities to Boyzone's trademark mid-tempo ballad sound and will be another big step in the US fivesome's bid to match their Irish counterparts in the boy band big league." Chuck Arnold from People Magazine named it their "sumptuous signature song", noting that it "is about leaving your life in the hands of that special someone — on just the one condition that they love you back. Sounds like a deal."

== Commercial performance ==
"As Long as You Love Me" was not released as a physical single in the U.S. but was shipped to radio and became an MTV staple.It spent 56 weeks on the US Billboard Hot 100 Airplay chart, peaking at number 4. The single has sold over 530,000 copies in the United Kingdom.

== Music video ==
=== Background ===
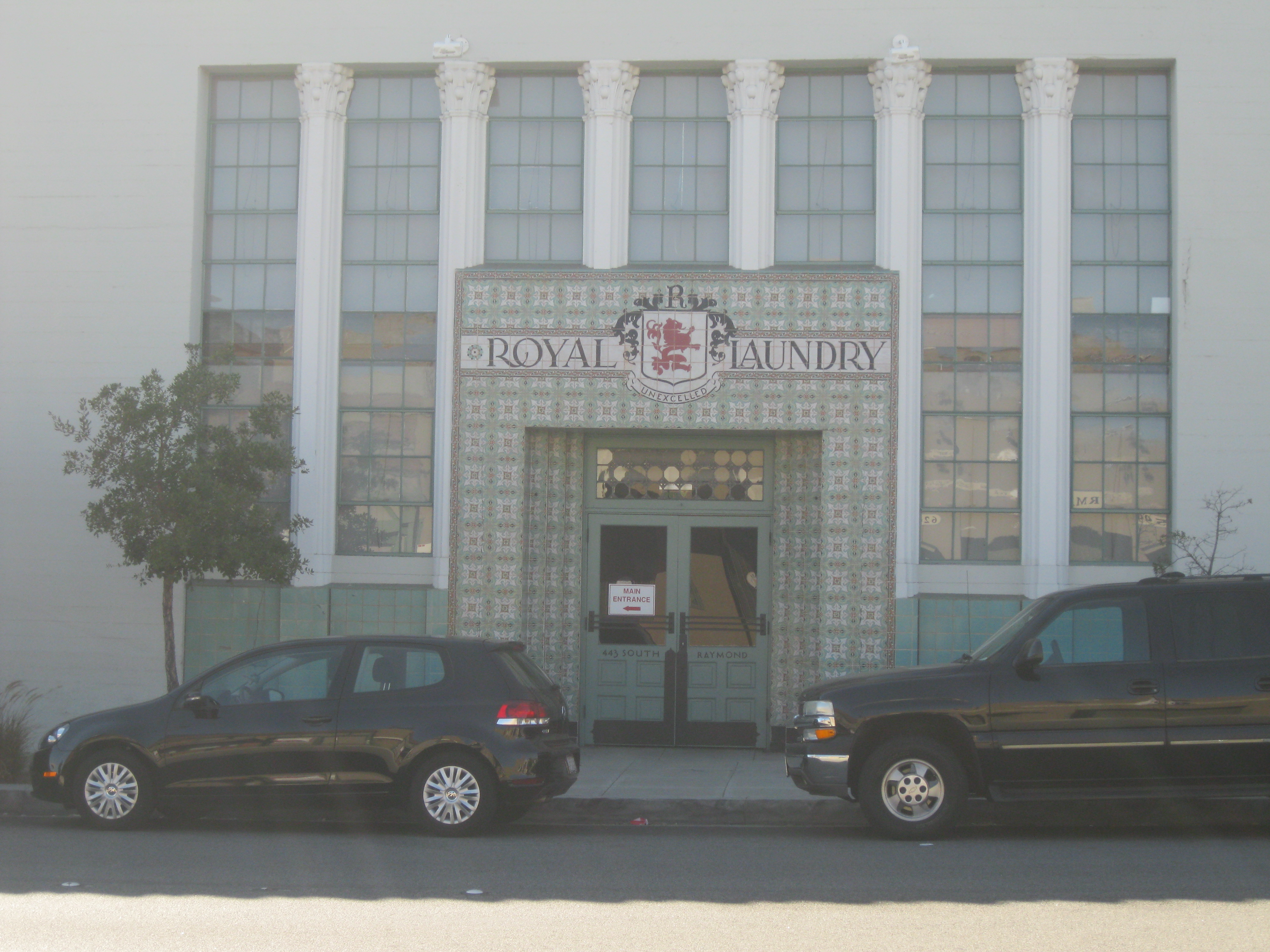
The music video was filmed at the Royal Laundry Complex (pictured)

The music video for "As Long as You Love Me" was directed by British director Nigel Dick and filmed on June 15, 1997, in Pasadena, California. AJ McLean learned the lyrics of the song on the day of the shoot, as he was initially meant to sing the song's bridge. Six women were chosen for the video, with the number chosen to ensure that they would not appear to be matched up with the band members. One of the women, Donna, was played by Leighanne Wallace, whom Littrell ultimately married in 2000.

=== Synopsis ===
The music video begins with the Backstreet Boys auditioning before six women. The women named Donna, Jana, Linda, Fatima, Gina, and Nina videotape the performances and take notes. The band members primarily sing and dance, each performing in a short "screen test" vignette in which they dress up in costumes and perform various unusual activities. During the bridge, they switch places with the women and have them perform screen tests. The positions reverse again towards the end of the song. The choreography uses folding chairs. Special effects are utilized in the video, most notably morphing sequences, where the face of one member morphs into another's. There are also quick dissolves or straight cuts between footage of the members, each doing the chair routine in the same position of the set. The cuts cause a working fan in the background to appear to stutter in its spin.

== Cover versions ==
The Netherlands retro rock band The Kik recorded a live version in Dutch ("Als jij maar van mij houdt") in the 3FM studio, using only Casio keyboards. Radio DJ Giel Beelen subsequently asked the band to release their version as a single.

In 2019, the duo La Folie and singer Jordi Ninus recorded a version in Catalan of this song, under the title "Si em dius que m'estimes" ("If you say you love me"), for the CD edited by La Marató de TV3, a telethon devoted to raising funds for the research of incurable diseases.

== Track listings ==
- UK 7-inch single

A. "As Long as You Love Me"
B. "Every Time I Close My Eyes"

- UK and European CD1
1. "As Long as You Love Me" (radio version) – 3:32
2. "Quit Playing Games (with My Heart)" (E-SMOOVE vocal mix) – 6:48
3. "Everybody (Backstreet's Back)" (Funked Up mix) – 7:13
4. "Every Time I Close My Eyes" – 3:55
- UK and European CD2
1. "As Long as You Love Me" (radio version) – 3:32
2. "As Long as You Love Me" (unplugged version) – 3:32
3. "As Long as You Love Me" (instrumental) – 3:30

== Charts ==
=== Weekly charts ===
1997–1998 weekly chart performance for "As Long as You Love Me"
Chart (1997–1998)	Peak position
Australia (ARIA)	2
Austria (Ö3 Austria Top 40)	2
Belgium (Ultratop 50 Flanders)	4
Belgium (Ultratop 50 Wallonia)	7
Canada (Nielsen SoundScan)	2
Canada Top Singles (RPM)	3
Canada Adult Contemporary (RPM)	4
Canada Dance/Urban (RPM)	4
Denmark (IFPI)	2
Estonia (Eesti Top 20)	1
Estonia Airplay (Eesti Top 25)	10
Europe (Eurochart Hot 100)	4
Europe (European Hit Radio)	1
Finland (Suomen virallinen lista)	17
Finland Airplay (Radiosoittolista)	3
France (SNEP)	19
France Airplay (SNEP)	42
Germany (GfK)	3
Honduras (El Siglo de Torreón)	5
Hungary (Mahasz)	3
Iceland (Íslenski Listinn Topp 40)	18
Ireland (IRMA)	6
Italy (FIMI)	6
Italy (Musica e dischi)	20
Italy Airplay (Music & Media)	1
Latvia (Latvijas Top 20)	1
Lithuania (M-1)	1
Netherlands (Dutch Top 40)	4
Netherlands (Single Top 100)	5
New Zealand (Recorded Music NZ)	1
Norway (VG-lista)	5
Romania (Romanian Top 100)	1
Scottish Singles Sales (Official Charts)	4
Spain (AFYVE)	3
Spain Airplay (Top 40 Radio)	1
Sweden (Sverigetopplistan)	4
Switzerland (Schweizer Hitparade)	4
UK Singles (Official Charts)	3
UK Airplay (Music Week)	3
UK Indie (Official Charts)	1
US Radio Songs (Billboard)	4
US Adult Contemporary (Billboard)	3
US Adult Pop Airplay (Billboard)	15
US Pop Airplay (Billboard)	3
US Rhythmic Airplay (Billboard)	9
Zimbabwe (ZIMA)	1

2023–2024 chart performance for "As Long as You Love Me"
Chart (2023–2024)	Peak position
Iceland (Tónlistinn)	25
Kazakhstan Airplay (TopHit)	74

=== Year-end charts ===
1997 year-end chart performance for "As Long as You Love Me"
Chart (1997)	Position
Australia (ARIA)	40
Austria (Ö3 Austria Top 40)	35
Belgium (Ultratop 50 Flanders)	29
Belgium (Ultratop 50 Wallonia)	36
Canada Top Singles (RPM)	97
Europe (Eurochart Hot 100)	27
Europe (European Hit Radio)	30
Germany (Media Control)	34
Italy (Musica e dischi)	90
Latvia (Latvijas Top 50)	7
Netherlands (Dutch Top 40)	24
Netherlands (Single Top 100)	19
Norway (VG-lista)	20
Romania (Romanian Top 100)	8
Sweden (Topplistan)	12
Switzerland (Schweizer Hitparade)	42
UK Singles (OCC)	25
UK Airplay (Music Week)	30

1998 year-end chart performance for "As Long as You Love Me"
Chart (1998)	Position
Australia (ARIA)	28
Brazil (Crowley)	25
Canada Top Singles (RPM)	26
Canada Adult Contemporary (RPM)	16
Canada Dance/Urban (RPM)	97
Europe (Eurochart Hot 100)	78
Latvia (Latvijas Top 50)	10
New Zealand (RIANZ)	33
US Adult Contemporary (Billboard)	6
US Adult Top 40 (Billboard)	39
US Mainstream Top 40 (Billboard)	7
US Rhythmic Top 40 (Billboard)	35

== Certifications ==
Certifications and sales for "As Long as You Love Me"
Region	Certification	Certified units/sales
Australia (ARIA)	3× Platinum	210,000^{‡}
Belgium (BRMA)	Gold	25,000^{*}
Brazil (Pro-Música Brasil)	Platinum	60,000^{‡}
Denmark (IFPI Danmark)	Platinum	90,000^{‡}
Germany (BVMI)	Platinum	500,000^{^}
Netherlands (NVPI)	Gold	50,000^{^}
New Zealand (RMNZ)	2× Platinum	60,000^{‡}
Spain (Promusicae)	Gold	30,000^{‡}
Sweden (GLF)	Platinum	30,000^{^}
United Kingdom (BPI)	Platinum	600,000^{‡}
^{*} Sales figures based on certification alone.^{^} Shipments figures based on certification alone.^{‡} Sales+streaming figures based on certification alone.

== Release history ==
Release dates and formats for "As Long as You Love Me"
Region	Date	Format(s)	Label(s)	Ref.
United Kingdom	September 29, 1997	CD; cassette	Jive	
United States	October 7, 1997	Contemporary hit radio	Jive	
Japan	October 22, 1997	CD	Jive	
