= Kristian Lundin =

Swedish composer, music producer and songwriter

- Born: Kristian Carl Marcus Lundin; 7 May 1973 (age 53); Järfälla, Stockholm, Sweden
- Genres: Pop
- Occupations: Music producer, composer, songwriter

Kristian Lundin (born 7 May 1973) is a Swedish composer, music producer and songwriter.

== Biography ==
Kristian's worked on the song "Quit Playing Games (with My Heart)" which he co-produced with Max Martin for the Backstreet Boys. He co-wrote & produced "Tearin' Up My Heart" for NSYNC as a follow-up.

Following the death of Denniz PoP, Kristian continued to work with fellow members of the Cheiron team, including Max Martin, Andreas Carlsson and Jake Schulze. They wrote and produced "Bye Bye Bye" for NSYNC, "Born to Make You Happy" for Britney Spears, as well as "That's the Way It Is," "Eyes on Me," and "I'm Alive" for Celine Dion.
