= Quit Playing Games (with My Heart) =

1996 single by Backstreet Boys

- Original European artwork

Single by Backstreet Boys

from the album Backstreet Boys (international and US)
- B-side: "Lay Down Beside Me"; "Give Me Your Heart"; "Christmas Time"; "Anywhere for You"; "Don't Leave Me"; "Nobody but You"; "Backstreet Boys Present... (Album Medley)"
- Released: October 14, 1996
- Recorded: December 1994–January 1995; August 1996 (re-recording)
- Studio: Cheiron (Stockholm, Sweden), Battery (London, UK)
- Genre: Pop; R&B
- Length: 3:52
- Label: Jive
- Songwriters: Max Martin; Herbie Crichlow
- Producers: Max Martin; Kristian Lundin

Backstreet Boys singles chronology
"Get Down (You're the One for Me)" (1996)	"Quit Playing Games (with My Heart)" (1996)	"Anywhere for You" (1997)

Backstreet Boys US singles chronology
"We've Got It Goin' On" (1995)	"Quit Playing Games (with My Heart)" (1997)	"As Long as You Love Me" (1997)

Alternate cover
- UK artwork

Audio sample
- A sample from "Quit Playing Games (with My Heart)": file; help

Music video
- "Quit Playing Games (with My Heart)" on YouTube

"Quit Playing Games (with My Heart)" (originally styled as "Quit Playin' Games (with My Heart)") is a song by American boy band Backstreet Boys, released in October 1996 by Jive Records as the fourth single from their international debut album (1996). It was written by Max Martin and Herbie Crichlow, and produced by Martin with Kristian Lundin. The song reached No. 1 in five European countries and No. 2 in the United Kingdom, topping the Eurochart Hot 100 for a single week. It was later included on the band's debut US album and was released as its second single in April 1997, reaching No. 2 on the Billboard Hot 100 chart that September, making it their highest-charting single on the chart. It sold two million copies in the US.

The accompanying music video for the song was directed by Kai Sehr and filmed in Florida, featuring the band members performing in the rain with their bare upper bodies during the second half of the video. In 2020, Rolling Stone ranked "Quit Playing Games (with My Heart)" at No. 26 in their list of the "75 Greatest Boy Band Songs of All Time".

== Background ==
Initially, Nick Carter, aged 14 at the time, was unable to sing on the recording of the song as he was undergoing puberty. The remaining band members were brought over to Stockholm for a week to record "We've Got It Goin' On" during late December 1994 and early January 1995. They unexpectedly finished the song in just two days and decided to record "Quit Playing Games (with My Heart)" immediately afterward.

"Quit Playing Games (with My Heart)" was first given an international release in 1996. In the United States, up to that point, only "We've Got It Goin' On" had been released, but the single was not a chart success. Jive Records planned to relaunch the group in the United States in 1997 with the new song "If You Want It to Be Good Girl (Get Yourself a Bad Boy)". The group instead pushed for a US single release of "Quit Playing Games (with My Heart)", and the song was released to radio in the United States in April 1997. Jive president Barry Weiss claimed that the other serious contenders included "Anywhere for You" and "All I Have to Give." The group also wanted to reshoot the music video, but the label refused, arguing that they only planned to market towards radio, not video. The song ultimately succeeded without MTV support. The background vocals in the song, besides McLean's self-harmonization on the bridge, consisted of Brian Littrell and Kevin Richardson, who decided to finish the song while the other members were having lunch.

=== Versions ===
The song's original recording features Brian Littrell singing both verses. This version was featured on the initial releases of their 1996 and 1997 self-titled albums. In August 1996, Max Martin flew to London in to re-record the second verse with Nick Carter at Battery Studios. This version was released as a single and was added to the later pressings of their 1996 international debut album and on the 1998 re-release of the US debut album. There is also an Italian version, "Non Puoi Lasciarmi Così”, included in the Italian release of their debut album, in which Kevin Richardson and Howie Dorough sing the lead vocals of the first two verses.

== Critical reception ==
AllMusic editor Stephen Thomas Erlewine wrote that the "slick production adds luster to the singles 'Quit Playin' Games (With My Heart)' and 'As Long as You Love Me', making them as irresistible as teen pop can be." Larry Flick from Billboard magazine noted that the song "cruises at a sweet jeep/funk pace, leaving plenty of room for a romantic lead vocal and layers of smooth harmonies." Can't Stop the Pop commented, "This is very much the archetypal Backstreet Boys mid-tempo, which laid the groundwork for many of their subsequent hits. [...] It expertly weaves together a distinctive guitar melody with shimmering '90s pop production (and a pseudo-R&B beat) to create a song that glistens with a halcyon sunniness from start to finish. Cheiron would refine and evolve the formula in the years that followed, but here we have it in its purest form. And it is terrific."

Greg Kot from Chicago Tribune said that on 'Quit Playing Games (With My Heart)' and 'As Long As You Love Me', "the boys embodied teen-dream vulnerability." A reviewer from Music Week gave the song three out of five, viewing it as "a warm, mid-tempo, but somewhat unexceptional, R&B number. A fourth big UK hit beckons." Gerald Martinez from New Sunday Times described it as "bittersweet". People Magazine named it a "peppy" ballad, noting that "despite a tinge of melancholy in the group's harmonies, one can't help smiling." Bob Waliszewski of Plugged In said that on the song, "the singer longs to return to days before insensitivity and manipulation threatened to destroy the friendship."

== Music video ==
The accompanying music video for "Quit Playing Games (with My Heart)" was filmed in Orlando, Florida on July 1, 1996. It was directed by Kai Sehr, and shows the group dancing and singing on a deserted basketball court at night. Halfway into the video, it begins to rain. Then, the boys' shirts are unbuttoned, showing their bare upper bodies as they continue to perform wet in the rain.

During the video shoot, Nick Carter lip-synced over Brian Littrell's vocals, as he didn't record his vocals until August that year. Initially, MTV was hesitant to air the video due to the boys taking their shirts off in the rain, but reluctantly embraced it after TRL viewership caught on with audiences. The music video premiered in October 1996 in Germany and in the week of June 15–22, 1997 in the U.S.

== Legacy ==
Polish magazine Porcys ranked "Quit Playing Games (With My Heart)" number 96 in their list of "100 Singles 1990–1999", naming it a "clever" ballad. In June 2017, Billboard ranked it number six in their list of "The 100 Greatest Pop Songs of 1997", writing, "A relatively modest first hit for the group that would define pop music for the last couple years of the millennium — a shuffling mid-tempo ballad built around an acoustic guitar riff, some airy synths, and one of the sweetest-sounding choruses the pop world had heard in a long time." In 2020, Rolling Stone ranked the song number 26 in their list of the "75 Greatest Boy Band Songs of All Time". In August 2026, Billboard ranked it number 30 in their "The Biggest No. 2 Hot 100 Hits of All Time"-list, noting that the song had peaked at number two, just behind The Notorious B.I.G. featuring Puff Daddy & Mase's "Mo Money Mo Problems" and Mariah Carey's "Honey".

== Track listing ==
- America

CD1 (Old version)

1. "Quit Playing Games (with My Heart)" (Video Version) – 3:52
2. "Backstreet Boys Present... (Album Medley)" – 6:57
3. "Lay Down Beside Me" – 5:30
4. "Quit Playing Games (with My Heart)" (LP Version) – 3:49

CD2 (New version)

1. "Quit Playing Games (with My Heart)" (LP Version)
2. "Quit Playing Games (with My Heart)" (E-SMOOVE Vocal Mix)
3. "Quit Playing Games (with My Heart)" (Jazzy Jim's Mixxshoww Slamma)
4. "Quit Playing Games (with My Heart)" (Maurice Joshua Club Mix)
- Europe

CD1 (Classic version)

1. "Quit Playing Games (with My Heart)" (Video Version) – 3:52
2. "Nobody But You" (Long Version) – 6:07
3. "Give Me Your Heart" – 5:06
4. "Quit Playing Games (with My Heart)" (Acoustic Version) – 3:56

CD2 (Winter version)

1. "Quit Playing Games (with My Heart)" (Video Version) – 3:56
2. "Christmas Time" – 4:20
3. "Lay Down Beside Me" – 5:32
4. "Quit Playing Games (with My Heart)" (Acoustic Version) – 3:57
- UK
1. "Quit Playing Games (with My Heart)" (Video Version) – 3:54
2. "Nobody But You" (Long Version) – 6:08
3. "Give Me Your Heart" – 5:08
4. "Lay Down Beside Me" – 5:27

Cassette

1. "Quit Playing Games (with My Heart)" (Video Version) – 3:52
2. "Lay Down Beside Me" – 5:30
- Japan
1. "Quit Playing Games (with My Heart)" (Video Version) – 3:52
2. "Quit Playing Games (with My Heart)" (Acoustic Version) – 4:02
3. "Anywhere for You" – 4:40
4. "Don't Leave Me" – 4:18

== Charts ==
=== Weekly charts ===
Chart (1996–1999)	Peak position
Australia (ARIA)	27
Austria (Ö3 Austria Top 40)	1
Belgium (Ultratop 50 Flanders)	8
Belgium (Ultratop 50 Wallonia)	5
Canada (Nielsen SoundScan)	3
Canada Top Singles (RPM)	18
Czech Republic (IFPI CR)	1
Denmark (IFPI)	9
Estonia (Eesti Top 20)	1
Estonia Airplay (Eesti Top 25)	3
Europe (European Hot 100)	1
Europe (European AC Radio)	9
Europe (European Dance Radio)	3
Europe (European Hit Radio)	8
Europe (Atlantic Crossovers)	4
France Airplay (SNEP)	28
Germany (GfK)	1
Iceland (Íslenski Listinn Topp 40)	20
Ireland (IRMA)	5
Israel (Israeli Singles Chart)	3
Latvia (Latvijas Top 20)	10
Lithuania (M-1)	1
Netherlands (Dutch Top 40)	5
Netherlands (Single Top 100)	7
New Zealand (Recorded Music NZ)	27
Norway (VG-lista)	10
Poland Airplay (Music & Media)	16
Scotland (OCC)	5
Spain Airplay (Top 40 Radio)	1
Sweden (Sverigetopplistan)	15
Switzerland (Schweizer Hitparade)	1
UK Singles (Official Charts)	2
UK Airplay (Music Week)	12
US Billboard Hot 100	2
US Adult Contemporary (Billboard)	2
US Adult Pop Airplay (Billboard)	18
US Hot Latin Songs (Billboard)	12
US Pop Airplay (Billboard)	2
US Rhythmic Airplay (Billboard)	5

Chart (2021)	Peak position
Finland Airplay (Radiosoittolista)	62

=== Year-end charts ===
Chart (1996)	Position
Austria (Ö3 Austria Top 40)	27
Belgium (Ultratop 50 Flanders)	99
Belgium (Ultratop 50 Wallonia)	80
Europe (Eurochart Hot 100)	65
Germany (Media Control)	16
Netherlands (Dutch Top 40)	38
Netherlands (Single Top 100)	49
Sweden (Topplistan)	82

Chart (1997)	Position
Austria (Ö3 Austria Top 40)	37
Belgium (Ultratop 50 Wallonia)	100
Europe (Eurochart Hot 100)	38
Germany (Media Control)	56
Latvia (Latvijas Top 50)	57
UK Singles (OCC)	56
US Billboard Hot 100	11
US Adult Contemporary (Billboard)	20
US Maxi-Singles Sales (Billboard)	45
US Rhythmic Top 40 (Billboard)	18
US Top 40/Mainstream (Billboard)	7

Chart (1998)	Position
Brazil (Crowley)	19
US Billboard Hot 100	62
US Adult Contemporary (Billboard)	19
US Adult Top 40 (Billboard)	87

=== Decade-end charts ===
Chart (1990–1999)	Position
Ireland (IRMA)	96
US Billboard Hot 100	86

== Certifications ==
Region	Certification	Certified units/sales
Australia (ARIA)	Gold	35,000^{‡}
Austria (IFPI Austria)	Gold	25,000^{*}
Denmark (IFPI Danmark)	Gold	45,000^{‡}
Germany (BVMI)	Platinum	500,000^{^}
New Zealand (RMNZ)	Gold	15,000^{‡}
Poland (ZPAV)	Gold	10,000^{*}
United Kingdom (BPI)	Silver	200,000^{‡}
United States (RIAA)	Platinum	1,200,000
^{*} Sales figures based on certification alone.^{^} Shipments figures based on certification alone.^{‡} Sales+streaming figures based on certification alone.

== Release history ==
Region	Date	Format(s)	Label(s)	Ref.
Europe	October 14, 1996	7-inch vinyl; CD	Jive	
United Kingdom	January 6, 1997	7-inch vinyl; CD; cassette	Jive	
United States	April 15, 1997	Contemporary hit radio	Jive	
Japan	April 23, 1997	CD	Jive	
United States	June 10, 1997	12-inch vinyl; CD; cassette	Jive	
