= Playlist: The Very Best of Backstreet Boys =

Greatest hits album by Backstreet Boys
- Released: January 26, 2010
- Recorded: 1994–2007
- Studio: Cheiron Studios, Stockholm, Sweden; Platinum Post Studios Orlando, Florida; Parc Studios, Orlando, Florida; Polar Studios, Stockholm, Sweden; Westlake Recording Studios Los Angeles, California; Conway Recording Studios, Los Angeles, California
- Length: 56:24
- Label: Legacy; Jive; Columbia
- Producer: Various

Backstreet Boys chronology
This Is Us (2009)	Playlist: The Very Best of Backstreet Boys (2010)	NKOTBSB (2011)

Professional ratings
Review scores
Source	Rating
AllMusic	4/5 stars

Playlist: The Very Best of Backstreet Boys is the second greatest hits album by American vocal group Backstreet Boys, released by Legacy Recordings as part of their Playlist series.

== Track listing ==
No.	Title	Original album	Length
1.	"Quit Playing Games (with My Heart)"	Backstreet Boys	3:53
2.	"As Long as You Love Me"	Backstreet's Back	3:32
3.	"Everybody (Backstreet's Back)" (Extended Version)	Backstreet's Back / Backstreet Boys	4:48
4.	"I'll Never Break Your Heart"	Backstreet Boys	4:47
5.	"All I Have to Give"	Backstreet's Back	4:36
6.	"I Want It That Way"	Millennium	3:34
7.	"Show Me the Meaning of Being Lonely"	Millennium	3:55
8.	"Shape of My Heart"	Black & Blue	3:52
9.	"More than That"	Black & Blue	3:43
10.	"Drowning"	The Hits – Chapter One	4:28
11.	"Larger than Life"	Millennium	3:54
12.	"Incomplete"	Never Gone	4:00
13.	"Just Want You to Know"	Never Gone	3:53
14.	"Inconsolable"	Unbreakable	3:36

== Charts ==
Weekly chart for Playlist: The Very Best of Backstreet Boys
Chart (2010–19)	Peak position
Australian Albums (ARIA)	47
Austrian Albums (Ö3 Austria)	42
Canadian Albums (Billboard)	49
Irish Albums (IRMA)	55

== Certifications ==
Region	Certification	Certified units/sales
Australia (ARIA)	Gold	35,000^{‡}
New Zealand (RMNZ)	Gold	7,500^{‡}
United Kingdom (BPI)	Gold	100,000^{‡}
^{‡} Sales+streaming figures based on certification alone.

== Credits ==
=== Backstreet Boys ===
- Howie Dorough – tenor/falsetto vocals
- AJ McLean – baritone vocals
- Nick Carter – tenor/baritone vocals
- Brian Littrell – tenor/falsetto vocals
- Kevin Richardson – bass vocals
