= The Hits – Chapter One (Backstreet Boys album) =

2001 greatest hits album by the Backstreet Boys

Greatest hits album by Backstreet Boys
- Released: October 23, 2001
- Recorded: October 1994 – April 2001
- Studios: Parc (Orlando, Florida, U.S.); Platinum Post (Orlando, Florida, U.S.); Cheiron (Stockholm, Sweden); Polar (Stockholm, Sweden); Matiz (Hamburg, Germany); Powerplay (Zurich, Switzerland); Battery (New York City, U.S.); Tates Creek High School (Lexington, Kentucky, U.S.)
- Genre: Pop
- Length: 65:03
- Label: Jive

Backstreet Boys chronology
| Black & Blue (2000) | The Hits – Chapter One (2001) | Never Gone (2005) |

Singles from The Hits – Chapter One
- 1. "Drowning" Released: September 25, 2001

The Hits – Chapter One, also known as Greatest Hits – Chapter One internationally, is the first greatest hits album released by American boy band Backstreet Boys. The album features 15 songs by the group, as well as a new song, "Drowning". "Drowning" was the album's only single, peaking at number four on the UK Singles Chart and charting in the top 10 in several countries.

A video album, featuring all of the videos from the release, was made available around the same time as the album. It peaked at number four on the US Billboard 200 chart and was certified platinum by the Recording Industry Association of America (RIAA). It was also their second album to reach number four in the US following Backstreet Boys in 1997, and their fourth consecutive top-ten album in the US following Black & Blue in 2000. The album sold over 6 million copies worldwide.

== Background ==
The Backstreet Boys' label, Jive Records, decided to release a Backstreet Boys greatest-hits CD by Christmas 2001 as they had not released a blockbuster album that year. The group resisted the release as they felt that it was too early in their career for such an album and that it would ruin their plan to mark the group's 10th anniversary in 2003 with a greatest-hits release. Band member Kevin Richardson said, "Our management company was supportive and we weren't. And the record company was going to put it out anyway. So it's either promote, or fight with your label, don't promote it and risk it doing very badly. But ultimately, who is it that's going to get hurt? It's not going to hurt our label. It's going to hurt us." Jive ultimately released the album after a long debate, despite threats from the group.

== Critical reception ==
Professional ratings
Review scores
| Source | Rating |
|---|---|
| AllMusic | 4.5/5 stars |
| Blender | 4/5 stars |
| New York Post | 3/4 stars |

AllMusic critic Stephen Thomas Erlewine called the Backstreet Boys "the first and best of the boy bands," praising The Hits – Chapter One as "a hell of a summation of the group's glory days." He highlighted its "lovely pop tunes" and called "Everybody" and "Larger Than Life" "infectious pop." Blender critic Alex Pappademas praised the Backstreet Boys' pop hits, noting that "they made some primo pop while they were on top." He called The Hits — Chapter One well suited to the greatest-hits format, praised "Larger Than Life" for actually rocking, and described "I Want It That Way" as "a career peak." However, he criticized the new single "Drowning," suggesting that the group should "quit before they turn into Journey." New York Postt critic Dan Aquilante called "Drowning" an "OK, Elton-esque piano ballad," but said it was "not good enough to justify buying the album." He noted that devoted fans already owned the other tracks.

== Commercial performance ==
The Hits – Chapter One debuted and peaked at number four on the US Billboard 200 the week of November 17, 2001. With 197,000 copies sold, it was a skimpy sales debut after the bands' last two albums debuted with more than one million copies. The album remained on the chart for a total of twenty-five weeks (including a re-entry dated February 20, 2016). On September 19, 2002, The Hits – Chapter One was certified platinum by the Recording Industry Association of America (RIAA) for shipments of over one million copies. As of June 2011, the album has sold 1,834,000 copies in the United States according to Nielsen SoundScan.

In the United Kingdom the album debuted and peaked at number five on November 10, 2001, staying there for a week. The album remained on the chart for nineteen weeks. It was certified platinum by the BPI on November 30, 2001, denoting shipments of 300,000 units.

The album was the 13th best-selling album of 2001, with 5 million copies shipped worldwide in that year according to the International Federation of the Phonographic Industry (IFPI). To date it sold over 6 million copies worldwide.

== Track listing ==
US edition
| No. | Title | Original release | Length |
|---|---|---|---|
| 1. | "I Want It That Way" | Millennium | 3:35 |
| 2. | "Everybody (Backstreet's Back)" (Extended Version) | Backstreet Boys | 4:47 |
| 3. | "As Long as You Love Me" (Single Remix) | Backstreet Boys | 3:34 |
| 4. | "Show Me the Meaning of Being Lonely" | Millennium | 3:56 |
| 5. | "Quit Playing Games (with My Heart)" | Backstreet Boys | 3:54 |
| 6. | "All I Have to Give" | Backstreet Boys | 4:38 |
| 7. | "Larger than Life" | Millennium | 3:54 |
| 8. | "I'll Never Break Your Heart" | Backstreet Boys | 4:50 |
| 9. | "The Call" | Black & Blue | 3:25 |
| 10. | "Shape of My Heart" | Black & Blue | 3:52 |
| 11. | "The One" | Millennium | 3:48 |
| 12. | "More than That" (Radio Mix) | Black & Blue | 3:43 |
| 13. | "Drowning" | The Hits - Chapter One | 4:27 |

Canadian edition
| No. | Title | Original release | Length |
|---|---|---|---|
| 1. | "I Want It That Way" | | 3:35 |
| 2. | "Everybody (Backstreet's Back)" (Extended Version) | | 4:47 |
| 3. | "As Long as You Love Me" (Single Remix) | | 3:34 |
| 4. | "Show Me the Meaning of Being Lonely" | | 3:56 |
| 5. | "Quit Playing Games (with My Heart)" | | 3:55 |
| 6. | "We've Got It Goin' On" | Backstreet Boys | 3:41 |
| 7. | "All I Have to Give" | | 4:38 |
| 8. | "Larger Than Life" | | 4:04 |
| 9. | "I'll Never Break Your Heart" | | 4:50 |
| 10. | "The Call" | | 3:25 |
| 11. | "Shape of My Heart" | | 3:52 |
| 12. | "The One" | | 3:48 |
| 13. | "More than That" | | 3:43 |
| 14. | "Drowning" | | 4:27 |

UK/Asian edition
| No. | Title | Original release | Length |
|---|---|---|---|
| 1. | "I Want It That Way" | Millennium | 3:35 |
| 2. | "Everybody (Backstreet's Back)" | Backstreet's Back | 4:47 |
| 3. | "As Long as You Love Me" | Backstreet's Back | 3:34 |
| 4. | "Show Me the Meaning of Being Lonely" | Millennium | 3:56 |
| 5. | "Quit Playing Games (With My Heart)" | Backstreet Boys | 3:55 |
| 6. | "We've Got It Goin' On" | Backstreet Boys | 3:41 |
| 7. | "All I Have to Give" | Backstreet's Back | 4:38 |
| 8. | "Larger Than Life" | Millennium | 4:04 |
| 9. | "I'll Never Break Your Heart" | Backstreet Boys | 4:50 |
| 10. | "The Call" | Black & Blue | 3:25 |
| 11. | "Shape of My Heart" | Black & Blue | 3:52 |
| 12. | "Get Down (You're the One for Me)" | Backstreet Boys | 3:52 |
| 13. | "Anywhere for You" | Backstreet Boys | 4:42 |
| 14. | "The One" | Millennium | 3:48 |
| 15. | "More than That" | Black & Blue | 3:43 |
| 16. | "Drowning" | The Hits - Chapter One | 4:27 |

Spanish edition
| No. | Title | Length |
|---|---|---|
| 1. | "I Want It That Way" | 3:35 |
| 2. | "Everybody (Backstreet's Back)" (Extended Version) | 4:47 |
| 3. | "As Long as You Love Me" | 3:34 |
| 4. | "Show Me the Meaning of Being Lonely" | 3:56 |
| 5. | "Quit Playing Games (With My Heart)" | 3:55 |
| 6. | "We've Got It Goin' On" | 3:41 |
| 7. | "All I Have to Give" | 4:38 |
| 8. | "Larger Than Life" | 4:04 |
| 9. | "I'll Never Break Your Heart" | 4:50 |
| 10. | "The Call" | 3:25 |
| 11. | "Shape of My Heart" | 3:52 |
| 12. | "Get Down (You're the One for Me)" | 3:52 |
| 13. | "Anywhere for You" | 4:42 |
| 14. | "More than That" | 3:43 |
| 15. | "Drowning" | 4:27 |
| 16. | "Nunca Te Haré Llorar (I'll Never Break Your Heart)" | 4:38 |

Italian edition
| No. | Title | Length |
|---|---|---|
| 1. | "I Want It That Way" | 3:35 |
| 2. | "Everybody (Backstreet's Back)" (Extended Version) | 4:47 |
| 3. | "As Long as You Love Me" | 3:34 |
| 4. | "Show Me the Meaning of Being Lonely" | 3:56 |
| 5. | "Quit Playing Games (With My Heart)" | 3:55 |
| 6. | "We've Got It Goin' On" | 3:41 |
| 7. | "All I Have to Give" | 4:38 |
| 8. | "Larger Than Life" | 4:04 |
| 9. | "I'll Never Break Your Heart" | 4:50 |
| 10. | "The Call" | 3:25 |
| 11. | "Shape of My Heart" | 3:52 |
| 12. | "Get Down (You're the One for Me)" | 3:52 |
| 13. | "Anywhere for You" | 4:42 |
| 14. | "More than That" | 3:43 |
| 15. | "Drowning" | 4:27 |
| 16. | "Non Puoi Lasciarmi Cosi" | 3:55 |

Original European edition (9222452ACP)
| No. | Title | Length |
|---|---|---|
| 1. | "I Want It That Way" | 3:35 |
| 2. | "Everybody (Backstreet's Back)" | 3:48 |
| 3. | "As Long as You Love Me" (Album Version) | 3:34 |
| 4. | "Show Me the Meaning of Being Lonely" | 3:56 |
| 5. | "Quit Playing Games (With My Heart)" | 3:54 |
| 6. | "We've Got It Goin' On" | 3:41 |
| 7. | "All I Have to Give" | 4:38 |
| 8. | "Larger Than Life" | 4:04 |
| 9. | "I'll Never Break Your Heart" | 4:50 |
| 10. | "The Call" | 3:25 |
| 11. | "Shape of My Heart" | 3:52 |
| 12. | "Get Down (You're the One for Me)" | 3:52 |
| 13. | "Anywhere for You" | 4:42 |
| 14. | "More than That" | 3:43 |
| 15. | "Drowning" | 4:27 |

Re-issued European edition (82876535592)
| No. | Title | Length |
|---|---|---|
| 1. | "I Want It That Way" | 3:35 |
| 2. | "Everybody (Backstreet's Back)" | 3:44 |
| 3. | "As Long as You Love Me" (Radio Version) | 3:40 |
| 4. | "Show Me the Meaning of Being Lonely" | 3:56 |
| 5. | "Quit Playing Games (With My Heart)" | 3:54 |
| 6. | "We've Got It Goin' On" | 3:41 |
| 7. | "All I Have to Give" | 4:38 |
| 8. | "Larger Than Life" | 4:04 |
| 9. | "I'll Never Break Your Heart" | 4:50 |
| 10. | "The Call" | 3:25 |
| 11. | "Shape of My Heart" | 3:52 |
| 12. | "Get Down (You're the One for Me)" | 3:52 |
| 13. | "Anywhere for You" | 4:42 |
| 14. | "The One" | 3:48 |
| 15. | "More than That" | 3:43 |
| 16. | "The Perfect Fan" | 4:13 |

Latin American edition 1
| No. | Title | Length |
|---|---|---|
| 1. | "I Want It That Way" | 3:35 |
| 2. | "Everybody (Backstreet's Back)" (Extended Version) | 4:47 |
| 3. | "As Long as You Love Me" | 3:34 |
| 4. | "Show Me the Meaning of Being Lonely" | 3:56 |
| 5. | "Quit Playing Games (with My Heart)" | 3:55 |
| 6. | "We've Got It Goin' On" | 3:41 |
| 7. | "All I Have to Give" | 4:38 |
| 8. | "Larger Than Life" | 4:04 |
| 9. | "The Call" | 3:25 |
| 10. | "Shape of My Heart" | 3:52 |
| 11. | "The One" | 3:48 |
| 12. | "More than That" | 3:43 |
| 13. | "Drowning" | 4:27 |
| 14. | "Nunca Te Haré Llorar (I'll Never Break Your Heart)" | 4:50 |
| 15. | "Donde Quieras Yo Iré (Anywhere for You)" | 4:42 |

Latin American edition 2
| No. | Title | Length |
|---|---|---|
| 1. | "I Want It That Way" | 3:35 |
| 2. | "Everybody (Backstreet's Back)" (Extended Version) | 4:47 |
| 3. | "As Long as You Love Me" | 3:34 |
| 4. | "Show Me the Meaning of Being Lonely" | 3:56 |
| 5. | "Quit Playing Games (with My Heart)" | 3:55 |
| 6. | "We've Got It Goin' On" | 3:41 |
| 7. | "All I Have to Give" | 4:38 |
| 8. | "Larger Than Life" | 4:04 |
| 9. | "I'll Never Break Your Heart" | 4:50 |
| 10. | "The Call" | 3:25 |
| 11. | "Shape of My Heart" | 3:52 |
| 12. | "Get Down (You're the One for Me)" | 3:53 |
| 13. | "Anywhere for You" | 4:42 |
| 14. | "The One" | 3:48 |
| 15. | "More than That" | 3:43 |
| 16. | "Drowning" | 4:27 |
| 17. | "The Perfect Fan" | 4:13 |
| 18. | "Nunca Te Haré Llorar (I'll Never Break Your Heart)" | 4:50 |
| 19. | "Donde Quieras Yo Iré (Anywhere for You)" | 4:42 |

Japanese edition
| No. | Title | Length |
|---|---|---|
| 1. | "I Want It That Way" | 3:35 |
| 2. | "Everybody (Backstreet's Back)" (Extended Version) | 4:47 |
| 3. | "As Long as You Love Me" | 3:34 |
| 4. | "Show Me the Meaning of Being Lonely" | 3:56 |
| 5. | "Quit Playing Games (with My Heart)" | 3:55 |
| 6. | "All I Have to Give" | 4:38 |
| 7. | "Larger Than Life" | 4:04 |
| 8. | "Anywhere for You" | 4:42 |
| 9. | "Get Down (You're the One for Me)" | 3:52 |
| 10. | "I'll Never Break Your Heart" | 4:50 |
| 11. | "The Call" | 3:25 |
| 12. | "Shape of My Heart" | 3:52 |
| 13. | "The One" | 3:48 |
| 14. | "More than That" | 3:43 |
| 15. | "Drowning" | 4:27 |
| 16. | "The Perfect Fan" | 4:13 |

Australian edition
| No. | Title | Length |
|---|---|---|
| 1. | "I Want It That Way" | 3:35 |
| 2. | "Everybody (Backstreet's Back)" (Extended Version) | 4:47 |
| 3. | "As Long as You Love Me" | 3:34 |
| 4. | "Show Me the Meaning of Being Lonely" | 3:56 |
| 5. | "Quit Playing Games (With My Heart)" | 3:55 |
| 6. | "All I Have to Give" | 4:38 |
| 7. | "Larger Than Life" | 4:04 |
| 8. | "I'll Never Break Your Heart" | 4:50 |
| 9. | "The Call" | 3:25 |
| 10. | "Shape of My Heart" | 3:52 |
| 11. | "Get Down (You're the One for Me)" | 3:52 |
| 12. | "Anywhere for You" | 4:42 |
| 13. | "The One" | 3:48 |
| 14. | "More than That" | 3:43 |
| 15. | "Drowning" | 4:27 |
| 16. | "The Perfect Fan" | 4:13 |

Australian bonus DVD (Greatest Hits – Chapter 1: Video Album)
| No. | Title | Length |
|---|---|---|
| 1. | "I Want It That Way" (music video) |
| 2. | "Everybody (Backstreet's Back)" (music video) |
| 3. | "As Long as You Love Me" (music video) |
| 4. | "Show Me the Meaning of Being Lonely" (music video) |
| 5. | "Quit Playing Games (With My Heart)" (music video) |
| 6. | "We've Got It Goin' On" (music video) |
| 7. | "All I Have to Give" (music video) |
| 8. | "Larger than Life" (music video) |
| 9. | "I'll Never Break Your Heart" (music video) |
| 10. | "The Call" (music video) |
| 11. | "Shape of My Heart" (music video) |
| 12. | "Get Down (You're the One for Me)" (music video) |
| 13. | "Anywhere for You" (music video) |
| 14. | "The One" (music video) |
| 15. | "More than That" (music video) |

Korean bonus disc
| No. | Title | Length |
|---|---|---|
| 1. | "All I Have to Give" (The Conversation Mix) | 4:14 |
| 2. | "Shape of My Heart" (Soul Solution Mixshow Edit) | 5:50 |
| 3. | "As Long as You Love Me" (Soul Solution Club Mix) | 8:07 |
| 4. | "Larger Than Life" (Jack D. Elliot Radio Mix) | 4:01 |
| 5. | "More than That" (Hani Radio Edit) | 4:03 |
| 6. | "Everybody (Backstreet's Back)" (MultiMan Remix) | 4:08 |

Taiwanese bonus disc
| No. | Title | Length |
|---|---|---|
| 1. | "Give Me Your Heart" |
| 2. | "You Wrote the Book on Love" |
| 3. | "If You Knew What I Knew" |
| 4. | "My Heart Stays with You" |
| 5. | "All I Have to Give" (a cappella) |
| 6. | "Everybody (Backstreet's Back)" (Matty's Club Mix) |
| 7. | "Shape of My Heart" (Soul Solution Radio Mix) |
| 8. | "The Call" (Neptunes Remix with Rap) |
| 9. | "Drowning" (Dezrok Club Mix) |

UK Jive Records Shop additional 12-inch vinyl
| No. | Title | Length |
|---|---|---|
| 1. | "Everybody (Backstreet's Back)" (Sharp London Vocal Mix) | 7:58 |
| 2. | "As Long as You Love Me" (Jason Nevins Radio Mix) | 3:38 |
| 3. | "I Want It That Way" (Morales Club Version) | 7:25 |
| 4. | "All I Have to Give" (Soul Solution Club Mix) | 6:34 |

The Video Hits – Chapter One DVD (US)
| No. | Title | Length |
|---|---|---|
| 1. | "Quit Playing Games (With My Heart)" | 3:56 |
| 2. | "As Long as You Love Me" | 3:39 |
| 3. | "Everybody (Backstreet's Back) (Short Version)" | 5:01 |
| 4. | "I'll Never Break Your Heart (U.S. Version) (alternative DVD edit)" | 4:41 |
| 5. | "All I Have to Give (DVD Version)" | 4:06 |
| 6. | "I Want It That Way" | 3:40 |
| 7. | "Larger Than Life" | 5:19 |
| 8. | "Show Me the Meaning of Being Lonely" | 4:21 |
| 9. | "The One" | 3:58 |
| 10. | "Shape of My Heart" | 3:49 |
| 11. | "The Call" | 4:03 |
| 12. | "More than That" | 3:58 |
| 13. | "Drowning" | 4:27 |

The Greatest Video Hits – Chapter One DVD (Japan)
| No. | Title | Length |
|---|---|---|
| 1. | "We've Got It Goin' On" |
| 2. | "Anywhere for You" |
| 3. | "Get Down (You're the One for Me)" |
| 4. | "I'll Never Break Your Heart" |
| 5. | "Quit Playing Games (with My Heart)" |
| 6. | "Everybody (Backstreet's Back)" |
| 7. | "As Long as You Love Me" |
| 8. | "All I Have to Give" |
| 9. | "I Want It That Way" |
| 10. | "Larger than Life" |
| 11. | "Show Me the Meaning of Being Lonely" |
| 12. | "The One" |
| 13. | "Shape of My Heart" |
| 14. | "The Call" |
| 15. | "More than That" |
| 16. | "Drowning" |

== Charts ==
=== Weekly charts ===
Weekly chart performance for The Hits – Chapter One by the Backstreet Boys
| Chart (2001) | Peak position |
|---|---|
| Australian Albums (ARIA) | 32 |
| Austrian Albums (Ö3 Austria) | 6 |
| Belgian Albums (Ultratop Flanders) | 11 |
| Belgian Albums (Ultratop Wallonia) | 32 |
| Canadian Albums (Billboard) | 1 |
| Danish Albums (Hitlisten) | 11 |
| Dutch Albums (Album Top 100) | 9 |
| European Albums Chart | 4 |
| Finnish Albums (Suomen virallinen lista) | 27 |
| German Albums (Offizielle Top 100) | 4 |
| Icelandic Albums (Tonlist) | 5 |
| Irish Albums (IRMA) | 9 |
| Italian Albums (FIMI) | 11 |
| Italian Albums (Musica e Dischi) | 12 |
| Japanese Albums (Oricon) | 1 |
| Malaysian Albums (IFPI) | 1 |
| New Zealand Albums (RMNZ) | 7 |
| Norwegian Albums (VG-lista) | 18 |
| Portuguese Albums (AFP) | 1 |
| Scottish Albums (OCC) | 4 |
| Singaporean Albums (RIAS) | 2 |
| South African Albums (RISA) | 2 |
| Spanish Albums (Promusicae) | 4 |
| Swedish Albums (Sverigetopplistan) | 13 |
| Swiss Albums (Schweizer Hitparade) | 10 |
| UK Albums (Official Charts) | 5 |
| US Billboard 200 | 4 |

=== Year-end charts ===
Year-end chart performance for The Hits – Chapter One by the Backstreet Boys
| Chart (2001) | Position |
|---|---|
| Canadian Albums (Nielsen SoundScan) | 32 |
| Danish Albums (Hitlisten) | 67 |
| Dutch Albums (Album Top 100) | 75 |
| German Albums (Offizielle Top 100) | 93 |
| Swedish Albums (Sverigetopplistan) | 60 |
| Swiss Albums (Schweizer Hitparade) | 79 |
| UK Albums (OCC) | 55 |

| Chart (2002) | Position |
|---|---|
| Canadian Albums (Nielsen SoundScan) | 157 |
| US Billboard 200 | 55 |

== Certifications ==
| Region | Certification | Certified units/sales |
|---|---|---|
| Argentina (CAPIF) | Gold | 20,000^{^} |
| Australia (ARIA) | Platinum | 70,000^{‡} |
| Belgium (BRMA) | Gold | 25,000^{*} |
| Brazil (Pro-Música Brasil) | Platinum | 125,000^{*} |
| Denmark (IFPI Danmark) | Gold | 25,000^{^} |
| Germany (BVMI) | Gold | 150,000^{^} |
| Japan (RIAJ) | Million | 1,000,000^{^} |
| New Zealand (RMNZ) | Gold | 7,500^{^} |
| South Africa (RISA) | 2× Platinum | 100,000^{*} |
| Spain (Promusicae) | Gold | 50,000^{^} |
| Sweden (GLF) | Gold | 40,000^{^} |
| Switzerland (IFPI Switzerland) | Gold | 20,000^{^} |
| United Kingdom (BPI) | 2× Platinum | 600,000^{‡} |
| United States (RIAA) | Platinum | 1,834,000 |
Summaries
| Europe (IFPI) | Platinum | 1,000,000^{*} |
^{*} Sales figures based on certification alone.^{^} Shipments figures based on certification alone.^{‡} Sales+streaming figures based on certification alone.
