= Backstreet Boys: Larger Than Life =

2017–19 concert residency by the Backstreet Boys

- Residency by Backstreet Boys
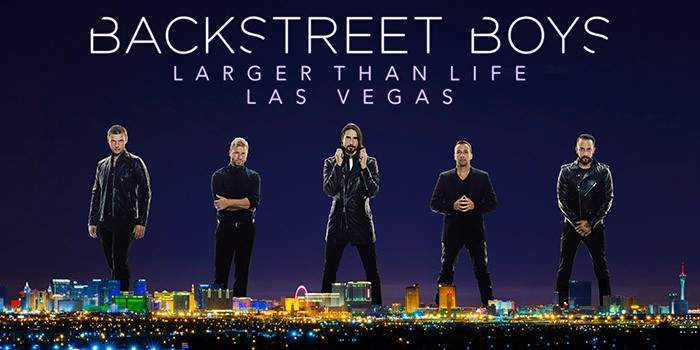
- Location: Paradise, Nevada, United States
- Venue: Zappos Theater at Planet Hollywood Resort & Casino
- Start date: March 1, 2017
- End date: April 27, 2019
- No. of shows: 80

Backstreet Boys concert chronology
- In a World Like This Tour (2013–2015); Backstreet Boys: Larger Than Life (2017–2019); DNA World Tour (2019–2024)

Backstreet Boys: Larger Than Life is the first concert residency by American vocal group Backstreet Boys, performed at Zappos Theater (formerly The AXIS Theater) in the Planet Hollywood Resort & Casino in the Las Vegas Valley, Nevada. The show had its opening night on March 1, 2017, and was scheduled to close on April 27, 2019, to start the Backstreet Boys' 10th world tour in May of the same year.

== Background and announcement ==
On April 1, 2016, member Nick Carter told Entertainment Tonight that the group signed a deal with Live Nation for a nine-show "test residency" in Las Vegas. AJ McLean confirmed the deal, telling Us Weekly that the residency would begin in January 2017.

On September 23, the Backstreet Boys confirmed their Vegas residency happening in 2017 titled Backstreet Boys: Larger Than Life.

== Reception ==
According to KVVU-TV 's report, "Backstreet Boys: Larger Than Life" is the fastest-selling Las Vegas Valley residency in history. It is also the first time that Planet Hollywood has opened up balcony seats for headliner, making the theater 2,000 seats bigger than fellow headliners Jennifer Lopez and Britney Spears.

== Performance and show elements ==
The band was backed by an eclectic band of musicians, a DJ, and a complement of ten backup dancers (five male and five female), like their past tour (Into the Millennium Tour). The band would sometimes split up and perform with one member to each side or corner of the stage, but for much of the show, they performed to one side at a time, circling the stage (often as part of the choreographed dancing) throughout each song. A video feed of the show was shown on video screens on both sides of the overhead lighting rig.

The boys began each show in a curtained-off enclosure on the venue's floor. They, dressed in purely white outfits that were reminiscent of their Millennium album cover, first descended from glowing blue and white boxes inside the Axis (now Zappos) theater, and they turned towards the audience before starting the first song, "Larger Than Life." Next, the dancers came out from behind the boxes and performed with them.

The boys used several costume changes during the show. Two versions of these costumes were built: The first encore outfits featured pink and black clothes to match. The later outfits (introduced as of February 2018 on the second leg of the residency) for the encore featured 90s clothes designed for each member. The dancers also wore white encore outfits.

After the first three songs (The One and Get Down (You're the One for Me)), AJ McLean would greet the audience as Nick Carter would either toss a used sweat towel or a signed water bottle into one of the pit seats. It would be caught by the hands of a fan in the VIP seats (three times he brought his son Odin on stage), and Kevin Richardson would Initially finish by introducing the song "Drowning, followed by "Incomplete" and then "Quit Playing Games (With My Heart)."

A never-before-seen home video montage using "Boys Will Be Boys" allowed the band to change into black sequin suits. Next, an instrumental number featuring the dancers performing a dance number before They were raised on the central platform with mic stands to sing "Show Me The Meaning Of Being Lonely," before coming down to a melody of ballads "I'll Never Break Your Heart," "Anywhere for You" and "Darlin'" (The two songs were later changed to Quit Playing Games). Next, "Undone" featured five female dancers descending the steps to the track while the boys remained on stage until the dancer came down to the band members to do a dance number. Later, Brian Littrell came out to discuss the song or share each fan moment. Next, They performed "As Long As You Love Me" with the song's signature "chair routine."

The never-before-seen home videos of the group members' past tours, performances, and award shows with their song "Everyone" were played as the boys changed into red, black, and leather outfits for the following songs "The Call," "We've Got It Goin' On" and "Get Another Boyfriend." Howie Dorough would be the last to talk and thank the fans for supporting them throughout the years of their career. Afterward, the band would sit down on the steps for the next song, "More Than That" (Later shows, they would interact with the audience).

They added matching black fedoras and surprised the audience with the "hat-dance" routine in "All I Have To Give." Then, they come out with roses for the next song, "Shape of My Heart," which they performed and pulled fans, celebrities guests (Former *NSYNC members Joey Fatone and Lance Bass, Snooki from Jersey Shore, Shania Twain, Donny, and Marie Osmond, Perez Hilton, Bachelor contestant Ashley Iaconetti and her then fiancé, now husband Jared Haibon, Backstreet Boys fan, Aerosmith's Steven Tyler & magician, and illusionist Criss Angel) and love ones from the audience onstage at the end (Brian and AJ had their mothers up at once, then AJ's two daughters on two occasions, Howie serenaded Stacey O'Neil, his sister-in-law and wife's sister, Both Brian's and Kevin's wives Kristin and Leighanne came upon two special ones (Richardsons' anniversary and Littrell's birthday), even AJ helped organized a proposal for his friend).

During another costume change, the dancers came out for a dance break in black (later in white) for the audience to an up-tempo medley of "Straight Through My Heart" and "It's Gotta Be You." Then, as an Encore, the boys returned to the stage in black (mixed with pink but replaced with blue street clothes later in the show) to perform "I Want It That Way," later adding " Don't Go Breaking My Heart" to the list.

The boys returned once more with the final encore, "Everybody (Backstreet's Back)," often in the same clothes (later switching to their 90s-inspired street clothes). After ending the song, an instrumental outro was played as the boys said their final goodnights and fooled around. Finally, they bowed to the audience under a confetti blast and ended the song and the concert. (On Halloween, all five guys dressed in their costumes from the song's music video.)

The final concert saw them headed down to the theater's VIP tables to their best supporting act - their loves and escort them up to the center of to the stage while performing "Shape of My Heart". McLean, and his wife, Rochelle, led the way, with the mom of two wearing a Backstreet Boys T-shirt and appearing emotional by the ballad's end; Carter, and his wife, Lauren, followed, with Lauren also rocking Backstreet Boys merchandise along with light blue hair, then smiling and glowing as Carter sweetly sang to her; Dorough, came next with his stunning wife, Leigh, who slay, strutting down the catwalk while dancing in a sexy white dress during another epic moment from a celebratory birthday weekend; Richardson, followed with his blonde beauty, Kristin, who appeared to be having a blast singing along as the two hit the spotlight; and lastly was Richardson's cousin, Littrell, whose wife, Leighanne, sweetly handed out roses to fans as she made her way to the stage. They concluded by serenading their gorgeous wives as all five couples were taken to the spotlight. Several pieces of video footage were filmed on Saturday night. At the song's end, the five singers dropped to their knees before handing the ladies long-stemmed roses to pay tribute.

== Setlist ==
The setlist is from opening night on March 1, 2017.

1. "Larger than Life"
2. "The One"
3. "Get Down (You're the One for Me)"
4. "Drowning"
5. "Incomplete"
6. "Quit Playing Games (With My Heart)"
7. "Show Me the Meaning of Being Lonely"
8. "I'll Never Break Your Heart"
9. "Anywhere for You" / "Darlin'" / "Undone"
10. "As Long as You Love Me"
11. "The Call"
12. "We've Got It Goin' On"
13. "Get Another Boyfriend"
14. "More Than That"
15. "All I Have to Give"
16. "Shape of My Heart"
17. "I Want It That Way"

Encore

18. "Everybody (Backstreet's Back)"

== Shows ==
Date	Attendance	Revenue
Leg 1
March 1, 2017	42,000 / 44,112 (95%)	$5,399,176
March 3, 2017	42,000 / 44,112 (95%)	$5,399,176
March 4, 2017	42,000 / 44,112 (95%)	$5,399,176
March 8, 2017	42,000 / 44,112 (95%)	$5,399,176
March 10, 2017	42,000 / 44,112 (95%)	$5,399,176
March 11, 2017	42,000 / 44,112 (95%)	$5,399,176
March 15, 2017	42,000 / 44,112 (95%)	$5,399,176
March 17, 2017	42,000 / 44,112 (95%)	$5,399,176
March 18, 2017	42,000 / 44,112 (95%)	$5,399,176
Leg 2
April 12, 2017	34,116 / 38,267 (89%)	$4,678,081
April 14, 2017	34,116 / 38,267 (89%)	$4,678,081
April 15, 2017	34,116 / 38,267 (89%)	$4,678,081
April 19, 2017	34,116 / 38,267 (89%)	$4,678,081
April 21, 2017	34,116 / 38,267 (89%)	$4,678,081
April 22, 2017	34,116 / 38,267 (89%)	$4,678,081
April 26, 2017	34,116 / 38,267 (89%)	$4,678,081
April 28, 2017	34,116 / 38,267 (89%)	$4,678,081
Leg 3
June 15, 2017	48,126 / 48,878 (98%)	$6,447,389
June 16, 2017	48,126 / 48,878 (98%)	$6,447,389
June 17, 2017	48,126 / 48,878 (98%)	$6,447,389
June 21, 2017	48,126 / 48,878 (98%)	$6,447,389
June 23, 2017	48,126 / 48,878 (98%)	$6,447,389
June 24, 2017	48,126 / 48,878 (98%)	$6,447,389
June 28, 2017	48,126 / 48,878 (98%)	$6,447,389
June 30, 2017	48,126 / 48,878 (98%)	$6,447,389
July 1, 2017	48,126 / 48,878 (98%)	$6,447,389
Leg 4
November 8, 2017	18,811 / 23,716 (79%)	$2,748,074
November 10, 2017	18,811 / 23,716 (79%)	$2,748,074
November 11, 2017	18,811 / 23,716 (79%)	$2,748,074
November 15, 2017	18,811 / 23,716 (79%)	$2,748,074
November 17, 2017	18,811 / 23,716 (79%)	$2,748,074
November 18, 2017	18,811 / 23,716 (79%)	$2,748,074
Leg 5
January 31, 2018	30,945 / 37,132 (83%)	$4,786,907
February 2, 2018	30,945 / 37,132 (83%)	$4,786,907
February 3, 2018	30,945 / 37,132 (83%)	$4,786,907
February 7, 2018	30,945 / 37,132 (83%)	$4,786,907
February 9, 2018	30,945 / 37,132 (83%)	$4,786,907
February 10, 2018	30,945 / 37,132 (83%)	$4,786,907
February 14, 2018	30,945 / 37,132 (83%)	$4,786,907
February 16, 2018	30,945 / 37,132 (83%)	$4,786,907
February 17, 2018	30,945 / 37,132 (83%)	$4,786,907
Leg 6
July 25, 2018	31,139 / 36,543 (85%)	$3,854,449
July 27, 2018	31,139 / 36,543 (85%)	$3,854,449
July 28, 2018	31,139 / 36,543 (85%)	$3,854,449
August 1, 2018	31,139 / 36,543 (85%)	$3,854,449
August 3, 2018	31,139 / 36,543 (85%)	$3,854,449
August 4, 2018	31,139 / 36,543 (85%)	$3,854,449
August 8, 2018	31,139 / 36,543 (85%)	$3,854,449
August 10, 2018	31,139 / 36,543 (85%)	$3,854,449
August 11, 2018	31,139 / 36,543 (85%)	$3,854,449
Leg 7
October 24, 2018		
October 26, 2018
October 27, 2018
October 31, 2018
November 2, 2018
November 3, 2018
November 7, 2018	21,057 / 24,789 (85%)	$1,484,562
November 9, 2018	21,057 / 24,789 (85%)	$1,484,562
November 10, 2018	21,057 / 24,789 (85%)	$1,484,562
November 14, 2018	21,057 / 24,789 (85%)	$1,484,562
November 16, 2018	21,057 / 24,789 (85%)	$1,484,562
November 17, 2018	21,057 / 24,789 (85%)	$1,484,562
Leg 8
February 6, 2019		
February 8, 2019
February 9, 2019
February 13, 2019
February 15, 2019
February 16, 2019
February 20, 2019
February 22, 2019
February 23, 2019
Leg 9
April 10, 2019	37,315 / 40,786 (91%)	$5,489,843
April 12, 2019	37,315 / 40,786 (91%)	$5,489,843
April 13, 2019	37,315 / 40,786 (91%)	$5,489,843
April 17, 2019	37,315 / 40,786 (91%)	$5,489,843
April 19, 2019	37,315 / 40,786 (91%)	$5,489,843
April 20, 2019	37,315 / 40,786 (91%)	$5,489,843
April 24, 2019	37,315 / 40,786 (91%)	$5,489,843
April 26, 2019	37,315 / 40,786 (91%)	$5,489,843
April 27, 2019	37,315 / 40,786 (91%)	$5,489,843
Total	263,509 / 294,123	$36,230,259

== Personnel ==
- Lead and Background Vocals — Kevin Richardson, Brian Littrell, Howie Dorough, Nick Carter, AJ McLean
- Show Manager:
- Assistant Show Manager:
- Creative direction — Raj Kapoor Productions
- Co-Director:
- Musical Director — Keith Harris
- Co-Director:
- Video Director — Bert Pare & Garry Odem
- Video Engineer / Crew Chief / LED Lead - Caudill Pictures & Entertainment Inc.
- Press Liaison:
- Monitor Engineer — Seth Kendall
- Tour Accountant: Mark Haworth - Tour Manager and Tour Accountant
- Playback Engineer — Romain Garnier
- Technical & Production Director- Dan Mercer
- Road Manager/Production Coordinator- Kristin Rinden
- FOH Engineer- James McCullagh
- Monitor Engineer- Seth Kendall
- Show Caller- Stephen Nimmer
- Stage Manager- David Commisso
- Head Carpenter- Jason Deleu
- Management — Jennifer "Jenn" Sousa, Ron Laffitte
- Lighting Director- Graham Anderson
- Tour Accountant — Mark Haworth
- Video Director- Bert Pare'
- Creative Direction and Design- Raj Kapoor Productions
- Director/Co-Production Designer/Screens Producer- Raj Kapoor
- Assistant Director/Associate Producer- Rita Maye Bland
- Lighting Designer/Co-Production Designer- Richard Neville
- Video Content- Silent Partners
- Staff Photographer- Justin Segura - VIP Coordinator/Photographer
- Musical Director- Keith Harris
- Pre-Show Mix- DJ Earworm
- Additional Music Production- Varun
- Costume Design- Tierney Burchett - Wardrobe
- Supervising Choreographer & Choreographer- Nolan Padilla
- Assistant Supervising Choreographer- Codie Wiggins
- Choreographer-Sharna Burgess***, Chase Benz, Alex Chung, Jojo Gomez, JaQuel Knight, Chuck Maldonado, Tricia Miranda
- Iconic Choreography- Rich + Tone, Fatima Robinson, Richard "Swoop" Whitebear

=== Security ===
- Michael "Mike" Elgani- Nick's Security
- Drew Philip- Head of Security/Road Manager/Brian's Security
- Aaron Tonga - Howie's Security
- Josh Naranjo - AJ's Security
- Keith McGuffey- Kevin's Security*

=== Band ===
- Keyboards - Lance Tolbert, Delvyn Brumfield (Co Musical Director/Keyboards/Synths/Strings)
- Guitars - Adam Hawley, Tim Stewart
- Bass - Andre Bowman
- Drums -
- Keith Harris - Musical Director/Drums/Keyboards
- Vocal Producer - David "DQ" Quinones
- Drum Programming/Arranger - Adrian "DJ Dubz" Wiltshire
- Programmer/Arranger - Kevin Teasley
- Engineer - John D Norten, Rico Simmons

=== Dancers ===
- Floris Bosveld (Dance Captain)
- Hailee Payne (Female Dance Captain)
- Valentino Vladimirov
- Teddy Coffey
- Steven Charles (2017-2018)****
- Jian Pierre-Louis
- Brooke Maroon
- Alyx Andrushuk
- Yorelis Apolinario (2017-2018)****
- Lindsey Desrosiers
- James Marino (2018-2019)****
- Genise Ruidiaz (2018-2019)****

=== Legal and Business Management ===
- Keller, Turner, Ruth, Andrew & Ghanem, PLLC
- Jordan S. Keller
- W. Chris Andrews
- Sarah A. Smith
- Meredith McGinnis
- Lindsay Brooker

=== Booking Agency ===
- William Morris Endeavor
- John Marx
- Brian Cohen

=== Vendors ===
- Lighting and Video- Production Resources Group
- Audio: Sound Image
- Automation and Staging- Show Group Production Services
- Fan Club & VIP Experience- Wonderful Union
- ER Productions
- Quantum SFX
- Jason Deleu

=== Touring Partners ===
- Live Nation
- Michael Rapino
- Steve Herman
- Kurt Melien
- Amanda Moore

=== Public Relations ===
- Caravan PR- Steven Trachtenbroit
- Edge Publicity- Shoshanna Stone

=== Fan Engagement and Website Design ===
- Wonderful Union
- Eddie Meehan
- Kat Gilbride
- Jennie Quan
- Justin Segura
- Matt Sergent
- Matt Ferro
- Chad Turner
- Nate Gabriel
- Mason Mullendore
- Anthony Ordonez
- Eric Warren

=== Wardrobe Contributors ===
- Magnanni Shoes
- Express
- Creative Recreation
- MAC Makeup
- AG Hair
- JakiMac
- Emporio Armani
- Coach

=== Caesars Entertainment ===
- Jason Gastwirth
- Talia Rothman
- Gavin Whiteley
- Edward Tex Dike
- John Demos

=== Merchandise Company ===
- Global Merchandising
- Barry Drinkwater
- Jen Florez
- Tracy Stone

=== Digital Marketing and Social Media Management ===
- Crowd Surf
- Cassie Petrey
- Jade Driver
- Helen Showalter

=== Travel Agent ===
- Preferred Travel
- Nancy Rosenblatt
- Debbie Rosenblatt

=== Afterparty Venue ===
- Chateau Nightclub and Rooftop

Clips from BACKSTREET BOYS – SHOW 'EM WHAT YOU'RE MADE OF feature film (c) Pulse Films/K Bahn LLC 2015 and BSB personal archives

Special Thanks:

- Millennium Dance Complex
- Warner Bros. Studios
- JetSuiteX
- Master Chefs Production Catering
- Sennheiser - For providing wireless microphones.

Notes

- Keith, known as Trey D, is an old friend of Kevin's from Kentucky
- Indicates which songs were part of a medley
- Sharna was Nick's dance partner on Dancing with the Stars
- Indicates which dancer did two years during the residency
