= Into the Millennium Tour =

1999–2000 concert tour by the Backstreet Boys

- Tour by Backstreet Boys
- Cover of the tour programme
- Associated album: Millennium
- Start date: June 2, 1999
- End date: March 15, 2000
- Legs: 3
- No. of shows: 123

Backstreet Boys concert chronology
- Backstreet's Back Tour (1997–98); Into the Millennium Tour (1999–2000); Black & Blue World Tour (2001)

The Into the Millennium Tour was the fourth concert tour by the Backstreet Boys in support of their third studio album, Millennium (1999). The tour comprised 123 concerts in 84 cities spanning three legs. The North American legs featured concerts at arenas and stadiums and it became one of the fastest grossing tours of all time.

The tour was beaten by the Bruce Springsteen and the E Street Band Reunion Tour for the Pollstar Concert Industry Award for Major Tour of the Year for 1999, but won the award for Most Creative Stage Production.

== Background ==
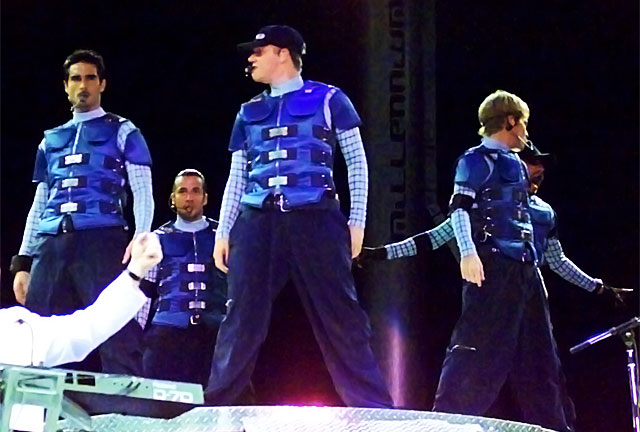
Performing during the tour

Before the tour commenced, the group filmed a Disney Channel concert special on May 11, 1999, from the New Amsterdam Theatre in New York City. The first leg of the tour was a European leg, which ran from June 2–August 7, 1999 and featured more than 40 concerts in over 30 cities and 13 countries. The first leg of the North American tour initially sold 53 dates (40 announced and 13 added due to demand) in 39 cities, scheduled to run from September 14–December 2, 1999. The entire leg sold out on the August 14 onsale date. The reported 765,000 tickets grossed sales estimated at $30 million, with face values set at $28.50 and $38.50, putting the entire tour on sale on one morning was an unusual sales method which allowed the on sale to become an event and resulted in broken sales records. A majority of the tickets sold out within the first hour of the sale, and several venues set records for sell-out speed. After adding several additional shows, the leg ultimately comprised 53 shows with some venues hosting three consecutive shows. As a result of Hurricane Floyd, which was approaching Florida, the band was forced to postpone the first two tour dates from September 14 and 15 to December 5 and 6.

This leg (if not also the final leg) was officially titled "Sears Presents Backstreet Boys Into The Millennium Tour", as Sears sponsored at least the first North American leg, as did Polaroid. The second North American leg of the tour ran from February 11–March 15, 2000. The concert at Georgia Dome, Atlanta, was the 5th most attended concert in American history and the most attended concert by a pop artist.

== Ticket controversy ==
There was some controversy over the distribution of tickets at the Denver show of the first tour leg by promoter House of Blues Concerts. It was alleged that House of Blues had reserved a large number of tickets not purchased by season-ticket holders to private brokers, instead of offering them to the public. The brokers then resold the tickets for well above face value. The band subsequently requested that House of Blues donate $75,000 to a Columbine High School scholarship fund as compensation for their actions. The promoter agreed to donate to Columbine victims but said it would offer the donation to a group of its choosing, claiming the Columbine College Fund, chosen by the band's management, might not have been legitimate.

== Production ==
=== Staging ===
The staging for the tour featured a pentagonal stage which situated in the center of each venue, with a 360-degree in the round design.

The stage featured a pentagonal outer track with five ramps to a central circular platform. This platform would normally be higher than the rest of the stage but could be lowered down below the stage to allow the band to enter from or exit the "understage" area (equivalent to "backstage"); the ramps would adjust accordingly. The platform and ramps could also be positioned flat at the level of the rest of the stage, creating a flat stage with only a slight step-up from the outer track to the center area.

The instrumental band was situated in the space between the outer track and the central platform, with band members separated from each other by the ramps. The stage was also accessible by stairways down off the outer edge of the stage to the venue floor, from where the "understage" could also be accessed. Among those involved in designing the staging was Mark Rabbit.

=== Performance and show elements ===
The group were backed by both a six-member instrumental band and a complement of ten backup dancers (five male and five female). The band would sometimes split up and perform with one member to each side or corner of the stage, but for much of the show, they performed to one side at a time, circling the stage (often as part of the choreographed dancing) throughout each song. The backup dancers sometimes performed on the opposite sides of the stage as the band. A video feed of the show was shown on video screens circling the overhead lighting rig.

The boys began each show in a curtained-off enclosure on the floor of the venue. The dancers carried torches onto the stage while marching to the prerecorded track of "The Imperial March". The boys would then rise from the curtained enclosure to the Star Wars theme song and ride to the stage on "hovering" surfboards employing wire harnesses. They would circle the stage and present themselves to each side of the audience before starting the first song, "Larger than Life".

The boys used several costume changes during the show. They wore "futuristic/space" costumes for the first segment of the concert. Two versions of these costumes were built: The original outfits featured blue checkerboard turtlenecks under padded blue vests. The later outfits (introduced as of February 19, 2000, in Atlanta, Georgia on the third leg of the tour). featured molded galactic armor-like tops which were individually designed for each member. Both costumes featured plain black pants. As the press is typically only permitted to photograph concerts for the first several songs, most press photos of the tour were of the band in their "space" costumes.

After the first three songs, each member would separately introduce themselves to the audience as the others changed into their next costume. Initially, this change involved removing the padded vests and wearing dark trench coats over the checkerboard turtlenecks from the space costumes. Later in the tour, the group donned black V-neck undershirts with the trenchcoats. They performed "As Long As You Love Me" with the song's signature "chair routine". The backup dancers performed an extended chair routine and the band played an extended instrumental outro as the boys changed into leather outfits for the next songs "Don't Wanna Lose You Now" and "Quit Playing Games (With My Heart)", during which the boys were again hooked up to wire harnesses and flown over the crowd (each to a different side of the audience) during the song's outro. They would throw stuffed animals out to audience members from the air. During the extended instrumental outro to that song, the boys would again change into red and black motocross racing deflectors (plastic upper body armor) on top of black shirts and pants. Metal ladders were added to the corners of the stage for the boys to climb and hang on to during the next song, "Don't Want You Back".

They removed the deflectors for the next song, "The Perfect Fan", which they performed with five sets of mothers and daughters from the audience brought onstage (Brian, Kevin, and Howie brought their mothers up at one point). Following that, a grand piano was lowered onto the central platform, and Kevin Richardson played a piano duet with saxophonist Mindi Abair, leading into "Back To Your Heart", which Richardson co-wrote. Nick Carter also played drums at some of the later concerts. After another costume change into white outfits and an extended intro, the boys performed an up-tempo medley of "Everybody (Backstreet's Back)", "We've Got It Goin' On" and "That's The Way I Like It".

An instrumental jazz melody was used to allow the band to change into suits (initially pink, but replaced with dark pin-striped suits later in the tour). They were raised on the central platform with stools and mic stands to sing a string of ballads. They added matching fedoras for the "hat-dance" routine in "All I Have To Give". "Show Me the Meaning of Being Lonely" featured five of the female dancers slow-dancing on the outer track while the boys remained on the upper platform until after the bridge when the band members came down to the track to slow-dance with a dancer. They returned to the platform and were lowered under the stage to end the song, and ostensibly end the concert.

As an encore, the boys returned to the stage in street clothes to perform "It's Gotta Be You" with a break in the song to introduce each of the dancers and allow each pair of male and female dancer to do a brief routine. They then introduced each instrumental band member and gave each a solo. Finally, they circled the stage to bow to each side of the audience under a blast of confetti and ended the song, and again, ostensibly, the concert.

The boys returned once more with the final encore, "I Want It That Way", often adding a local sports jersey to their previous street clothes. After ending the song, an instrumental outro was played as the boys said their final goodnights, fooled around, shook hands with the audience members and had a sing-along with the crowd to the final choruses of the song. The group were then escorted out of each venue by security and onto their bus often known as a quick out while the instrumental band would play an extended outro with pyrotechnics and confetti raining down and ending the concert completely.

=== Merchandising ===
The Backstreet Boys agreed to a merchandising tie-in with Burger King to exclusively sell a set of three CDs and one VHS cassette featuring songs and videos respectively from the tour. Each For The Fans CD contained three live tracks from the tour, as well as three studio-recorded tracks, and enhanced computer content. The video contained footage of five songs, as well as interviews and other footage from around the tour. The material comes mainly from the concert in Indianapolis, Indiana.

== Tour dates ==
List of 1999 concerts
Date	City	Country	Venue	Opening Act
June 2, 1999	Ghent	Belgium	Flanders Expo	—N/a
June 3, 1999	Ghent	Belgium	Flanders Expo	—N/a
June 4, 1999	Frankfurt	Germany	Festhalle Frankfurt	—N/a
June 5, 1999	Amsterdam	Netherlands	Amsterdam Arena	—N/a
June 7, 1999	Cologne	Germany	Kölnarena	—N/a
June 8, 1999	Paris	France	Palais Omnisports de Paris-Bercy	—N/a
June 10, 1999	Manchester	England	Manchester Evening News Arena	—N/a
June 11, 1999	Newcastle	England	Telewest Arena	—N/a
June 13, 1999	Birmingham	England	NEC Arena	—N/a
June 14, 1999	Birmingham	England	NEC Arena	—N/a
June 16, 1999	London	England	Earls Court Exhibition Centre	—N/a
June 17, 1999	London	England	Earls Court Exhibition Centre	—N/a
June 20, 1999	Mannheim	Germany	Maimarkthalle	—N/a
June 21, 1999	Bielefeld	Germany	Seidensticker Halle	—N/a
June 22, 1999	Oberhausen	Germany	König Pilsener Arena	—N/a
June 24, 1999	Münster	Germany	Muensterlandhalle	—N/a
June 25, 1999	Stuttgart	Germany	Hanns-Martin-Schleyer-Halle	—N/a
June 26, 1999	Munich	Germany	Olympiahalle	—N/a
June 27, 1999	Zürich	Switzerland	Hallenstadion	—N/a
June 29, 1999	Rome	Italy	Stadio Olimpico	—N/a
July 1, 1999	Milan	Italy	Forum di Assago	—N/a
July 2, 1999	Milan	Italy	Forum di Assago	—N/a
July 3, 1999	Milan	Italy	Forum di Assago	—N/a
July 5, 1999	Vienna	Austria	Wiener Stadthalle	—N/a
July 6, 1999	Rieden	Germany	Ostbayernhalle	—N/a
July 7, 1999	Friedrichshafen	Germany	Messehalle Friedrichshafen	—N/a
July 9, 1999	Viareggio	Italy	Stadio dei Pini	—N/a
July 11, 1999	San Sebastián	Spain	Velódromo de Anoeta	—N/a
July 12, 1999	Zaragoza	Spain	Pabellón Príncipe Felipe	—N/a
July 13, 1999	Barcelona	Spain	Palau Sant Jordi	—N/a
July 14, 1999	Barcelona	Spain	Palau Sant Jordi	—N/a
July 16, 1999	Madrid	Spain	Palacio de Deportes	—N/a
July 18, 1999	Gijón	Spain	Estadio Municipal El Molinón	—N/a
July 21, 1999	Bremen	Germany	Stadthalle Bremen	—N/a
July 22, 1999	Leipzig	Germany	Messehalle 7	—N/a
July 23, 1999	Berlin	Germany	Velodrom	—N/a
July 24, 1999	Berlin	Germany	Velodrom	—N/a
July 26, 1999	Rotterdam	Netherlands	Sportpaleis van Ahoy	—N/a
July 27, 1999	Rotterdam	Netherlands	Sportpaleis van Ahoy	—N/a
July 29, 1999	Copenhagen	Denmark	Forum Copenhagen	—N/a
July 30, 1999	Oslo	Norway	Oslo Spektrum	—N/a
July 31, 1999	Oslo	Norway	Oslo Spektrum	—N/a
August 2, 1999	Helsinki	Finland	Hartwall Areena	—N/a
August 3, 1999	Helsinki	Finland	Hartwall Areena	—N/a
August 5, 1999	Gothenburg	Sweden	Scandinavium	—N/a
August 6, 1999	Stockholm	Sweden	Stockholm Globe Arena	—N/a
August 7, 1999	Stockholm	Sweden	Stockholm Globe Arena	—N/a
September 17, 1999	Charlotte	United States	Charlotte Coliseum	Mandy Moore; EYC
September 18, 1999	Washington, D.C.	United States	MCI Center	Mandy Moore; EYC
September 19, 1999	Washington, D.C.	United States	MCI Center	Mandy Moore; EYC
September 21, 1999	Boston	United States	FleetCenter	Mandy Moore; EYC
September 22, 1999	Boston	United States	FleetCenter	Mandy Moore; EYC
September 23, 1999	East Rutherford	United States	Continental Airlines Arena	Mandy Moore; EYC
September 24, 1999	East Rutherford	United States	Continental Airlines Arena	Mandy Moore; EYC
September 26, 1999	Uniondale	United States	Nassau Veterans Memorial Coliseum	Mandy Moore; EYC
September 27, 1999	Uniondale	United States	Nassau Veterans Memorial Coliseum	Mandy Moore; EYC
September 29, 1999	Philadelphia	United States	First Union Center	Mandy Moore; EYC
September 30, 1999	Philadelphia	United States	First Union Center	Mandy Moore; EYC
October 4, 1999	Columbus	United States	Value City Arena	Mandy Moore; EYC
October 5, 1999	Rosemont	United States	Allstate Arena	Mandy Moore; EYC
October 6, 1999	Rosemont	United States	Allstate Arena	Mandy Moore; EYC
October 7, 1999	Rosemont	United States	Allstate Arena	Mandy Moore; EYC
October 9, 1999	Minneapolis	United States	Target Center	Mandy Moore; EYC
October 12, 1999	Phoenix	United States	America West Arena	Mandy Moore; EYC
October 14, 1999	Anaheim	United States	Arrowhead Pond of Anaheim	Mandy Moore; EYC
October 15, 1999	Anaheim	United States	Arrowhead Pond of Anaheim	Mandy Moore; EYC
October 16, 1999	Las Vegas	United States	MGM Grand Garden Arena	Mandy Moore; EYC
October 19, 1999	Inglewood	United States	Great Western Forum	Mandy Moore; EYC
October 20, 1999	Inglewood	United States	Great Western Forum	Mandy Moore; EYC
October 21, 1999	San Jose	United States	San Jose Arena	Mandy Moore; EYC
October 22, 1999	San Jose	United States	San Jose Arena	Mandy Moore; EYC
October 25, 1999	Portland	United States	Rose Garden	Mandy Moore; EYC
October 26, 1999	Tacoma	United States	Tacoma Dome	Mandy Moore; EYC
October 28, 1999	Salt Lake City	United States	Delta Center	Mandy Moore; EYC
October 29, 1999	Salt Lake City	United States	Delta Center	Mandy Moore; EYC
October 31, 1999	Denver	United States	Pepsi Center	Mandy Moore; EYC
November 2, 1999	Iowa City	United States	Carver–Hawkeye Arena	Mandy Moore; EYC
November 3, 1999	Madison	United States	Kohl Center	Mandy Moore; EYC
November 4, 1999	Milwaukee	United States	Bradley Center	Mandy Moore; EYC
November 6, 1999	Auburn Hills	United States	The Palace of Auburn Hills	Mandy Moore; EYC
November 7, 1999	Auburn Hills	United States	The Palace of Auburn Hills	Mandy Moore; EYC
November 8, 1999	Auburn Hills	United States	The Palace of Auburn Hills	Mandy Moore; EYC
November 10, 1999	Montreal	Canada	Molson Centre	Mandy Moore; EYC
November 11, 1999	Toronto	Canada	SkyDome	Mandy Moore; EYC
November 12, 1999	Ottawa	Canada	Corel Centre	Mandy Moore; EYC
November 14, 1999	Buffalo	United States	Marine Midland Arena	Mandy Moore; EYC
November 15, 1999	Cincinnati	United States	Firstar Arena	Mandy Moore; EYC
November 17, 1999	St. Louis	United States	Kiel Center	Mandy Moore; EYC
November 18, 1999	Kansas City	United States	Kemper Arena	Mandy Moore; EYC
November 20, 1999	New Orleans	United States	New Orleans Arena	Mandy Moore; EYC
November 21, 1999	Memphis	United States	Pyramid Arena	Mandy Moore; EYC
November 23, 1999	Birmingham	United States	BJCC Arena	Mandy Moore; EYC
November 24, 1999	Atlanta	United States	Philips Arena	Mandy Moore; EYC
November 26, 1999	Lexington	United States	Rupp Arena	Mandy Moore; EYC
November 28, 1999	Knoxville	United States	Thompson–Boling Arena	Mandy Moore; EYC
November 29, 1999	Nashville	United States	Gaylord Entertainment Center	Mandy Moore; EYC
December 1, 1999	Orlando	United States	Orlando Arena	Mandy Moore; EYC
December 2, 1999	Tampa	United States	Ice Palace	Mandy Moore; EYC
December 5, 1999	Sunrise	United States	National Car Rental Center	Mandy Moore; EYC
December 6, 1999	Sunrise	United States	National Car Rental Center	Mandy Moore; EYC

List of 2000 concerts
Date	City	Country	Venue	Opening Act
February 11, 2000	University Park	United States	Bryce Jordan Center	Willa Ford; Jungle Brothers
February 12, 2000	University Park	United States	Bryce Jordan Center	Willa Ford; Jungle Brothers
February 14, 2000	Albany	United States	Pepsi Arena	Willa Ford; Jungle Brothers
February 15, 2000	Albany	United States	Pepsi Arena	Willa Ford; Jungle Brothers
February 17, 2000	Charlotte	United States	Charlotte Coliseum	Willa Ford; Jungle Brothers
February 18, 2000	Raleigh	United States	Raleigh Entertainment & Sports Arena	Willa Ford; Jungle Brothers
February 19, 2000	Atlanta	United States	Georgia Dome	Willa Ford; Jungle Brothers
February 20, 2000	Greensboro	United States	Greensboro Coliseum	Willa Ford; Jungle Brothers
February 24, 2000	St. Petersburg	United States	Tropicana Field	Willa Ford; Jungle Brothers
February 26, 2000	New Orleans	United States	Louisiana Superdome	Willa Ford; Jungle Brothers
February 28, 2000	Houston	United States	Compaq Center	Willa Ford; Jungle Brothers
February 29, 2000	Houston	United States	Compaq Center	Willa Ford; Jungle Brothers
March 1, 2000	San Antonio	United States	Alamodome	Willa Ford; Jungle Brothers
March 3, 2000	Dallas	United States	Reunion Arena	Willa Ford; Jungle Brothers
March 4, 2000	Dallas	United States	Reunion Arena	Willa Ford; Jungle Brothers
March 5, 2000	Austin	United States	Frank Erwin Center	Willa Ford; Jungle Brothers
March 7, 2000	St. Louis	United States	Trans World Dome	Willa Ford; Jungle Brothers
March 9, 2000	Cleveland	United States	Gund Arena	Willa Ford; Jungle Brothers
March 10, 2000	Indianapolis	United States	Conseco Fieldhouse	Willa Ford; Jungle Brothers
March 11, 2000	Indianapolis	United States	Conseco Fieldhouse	Willa Ford; Jungle Brothers
March 13, 2000	East Lansing	United States	Breslin Student Events Center	Willa Ford; Jungle Brothers
March 14, 2000	Hamilton	Canada	Copps Coliseum	Willa Ford; Jungle Brothers
March 15, 2000	Toronto	Canada	SkyDome	Willa Ford; Jungle Brothers

Cancellations and rescheduled shows

September 14, 1999	Sunrise, Florida	National Car Rental Center	Rescheduled to December 5, 1999, due to Hurricane Floyd
September 15, 1999	Sunrise, Florida	National Car Rental Center	Rescheduled to December 6, 1999, due to Hurricane Floyd
February 22, 2000	Greenville, South Carolina	BI-LO Center	Cancelled due to The Grammys
March 5, 2000	Oklahoma City, Oklahoma	Myriad Convention Center Arena	Cancelled

== Personnel ==
- Lead Vocals: Kevin Richardson, Brian Littrell, Howie Dorough, Nick Carter, AJ McLean
- Tour Director:
- Tour Manager: Paul "Skip" Rickert
- Assistant Tour Manager: Tim Krieg
- Co-director: Denise McLean
- Co-director: Nicole Peltz
- Press Liaison: Leila Eminson
- Tour Accountant: Vincent Corry
- Staff Photographer: Andre Csillig
- Musical Director: William 'Bubba' Bryant
- Costume Design: john bowman, david cardona, versace
- Choreographer: Fatima Robinson**
- Assistant Choreographer: Richard "Swoop" Whitebear***

=== Security ===
- Billy Evans: Nick's Security
- Tom LeBrun: Head of Security/Brian's Security
- Marc Preston: Howie's Security
- Marcus Johnson: AJ's Security
- Carlos Cardenas: Kevin's Security
- John "Q" Elgani: Security*****

=== Band ===
- Louie Vigilante : Bass
- William ‘Bubba’ Bryant (RIP) : Drums
- Billy Chaplin : Guitar (June 2–5)
- Guy Walker : Guitar
- Dennis Gallo : Guitar, Keys
- Tommy Smith : Keys
- Mindi Abair : Keys, Percussion, Soprano Sax

=== Dancers ===
- Kristin Denehy (1999–2000)******
- Teresa LeBron (1999–2000)
- Earl "Sleepy" Manning (1999–2000)
- Roland "RoRo" Tabor (1999)*
- Nicole "Nikki" DeLecia (now Williams) (1999–?)
- Reginald "Reggie" Jackson (1999–2000)
- Nefertiti Robinson (now Freeney)** (1999–?)*
- Amy Allen (1999)*
- Richard "Swoop" Whitebear*** (1999)*
- Richmond "Rich" Talauega (Europe 1999, 2000)****
- Anthony "Tone" Talauega (2000)****
- Ed "Emo" Moore (1999)*
- "Flli"
- Anwar Burton
- Raymond "Ray" Ultarte (1999, RIP)*
- Melanie Lewis (now Lewis-Yribar)
- Angela Elgani (née Randle)*****

=== Notes ===
1. Indicates which dancer appear in 1999 *
2. Fatima and Nefertiti Robinson are sisters **
3. Swoop also assists Fatima for the rest of the tour ***
4. Brothers Rich and Tone also choreograph the Boys' following tours: Never Gone, IAWLT, DNA, their Vegas and Into the Millennium 2.0 residencies ****
5. One of the dancers, Angela, recently married Backstreet Boys security, John "Q" Elgani *****
6. Kristin is the daughter of former MLB player Bill Denehy******
