= Hey Mr. DJ =

Hey Mr. DJ may refer to:

- "Hey Mr. DJ" (Van Morrison song), a 2002 single by Van Morrison, from the album Down the Road.
- "Hey Mr. D.J." (Zhané song), a 1993 single released by Zhané
- "Hey Mr. DJ (Won't You Play Another Love Song)", a 2006 single released by Swedish musician Per Gessle, from his album Son of a Plumber
- "Slow Dance (Hey Mr. DJ)", a 1992 single released by R. Kelly, from the album Born into the 90's
- "Hey, Mr. DJ", a song by Tiny Masters of Today from the album Bang Bang Boom Cake
- "Hey, Mr. DJ, I Thought You Said We Had A Deal", song by They Might Be Giants from the album Miscellaneous T
- "Hey, Mr. DJ (Keep Playin' This Song)", song by the Backstreet Boys from the album Backstreet's Back
- A common refrain of the song "Pon de Replay" by Rihanna
- A common refrain of the song "Music" by Madonna

== See also ==
- Hey DJ (disambiguation)
