= Anywhere for You (Backstreet Boys song) =

1997 single by Backstreet Boys

Single by Backstreet Boys

from the album Backstreet Boys (international and US) and Backstreet's Back (Canada)
- B-side: "I'll Never Find Someone Like You," "Let's Have a Party," "Happy Valentine"
- Released: February 24, 1997
- Recorded: 1994
- Studio: Parc (Orlando, Florida)
- Genre: Pop
- Length: 4:40
- Label: Jive
- Songwriters: Gary Baker; Wayne Perry
- Producer: Veit Renn

Backstreet Boys singles chronology
"Quit Playing Games (with My Heart)" (1996)	"Anywhere for You" (1997)	"Everybody (Backstreet's Back)" (1997)

Music video
- "Anywhere for You" on YouTube

"Anywhere for You" is a song by American boy band Backstreet Boys, released on February 24, 1997, by Jive Records as the fifth and final single from their international self-titled debut album. It was also included on the Canadian edition of Backstreet's Back and later included on their debut US album as well. This is one of the earlier recordings on their 1996 debut album. The song was written by Wayne Perry and Gary Baker in 1994, recorded by the group at the end of that year, and produced by Veit Renn. A Spanish version of the song, titled "Donde Quieras Yo Iré," was recorded in late 1995 in Zürich along with a Spanish version of "I'll Never Break Your Heart".

== Critical reception ==
Alan Jones from Music Week wrote that "Anywhere for You" "is an impeccably performed ballad on which the boys indulge in much vocal interplay. The whole thing is decorated with sweet harmonies and smells like another major hit for the rapidly developing group."

== Music video ==
The accompanying music video for "Anywhere for You" features the band on a beach in Miami Beach, Florida, on January 11, 1996, engaging in various recreational activities, such as biking and volleyball. Other shots show them singing the song on the rocks by the water.

== Track listings ==
- CD1, UK
1. "Anywhere for You" (Album Version) – 4:40
2. "I'll Never Find Someone Like You" – 4:23
3. "Donde Quieras Yo Ire (Anywhere for You)" (Spanish version) – 4:50
- CD2, UK
1. "Anywhere for You" (Album Version) – 4:40
2. "Let's Have a Party" – 3:49
3. "We've Got It Goin' On" (Amadin Club Mix) – 6:33
- CD single, Germany
1. "Anywhere for You" (Album Version) – 4:40
2. "I'll Never Find Someone Like You" – 4:23
3. "We've Got It Goin' On" (Marcus Mix) – 6:10
4. "Happy Valentine" – 3:30

== Credits and personnel ==
- Produced by Veit Renn
- Mixed by Chris Trevett at Battery Studios
- Recorded by Joe Smith at Parc Studios

== Charts ==
=== Weekly charts ===
Chart (1997–1998)	Peak position
Austria (Ö3 Austria Top 40)	7
Belgium (Ultratop 50 Flanders)	20
Belgium (Ultratop 50 Wallonia)	8
Canada (Nielsen SoundScan)	6
Europe (Eurochart Hot 100)	13
Europe (European Hit Radio)	18
Germany (GfK)	3
Ireland (IRMA)	16
Israel (Israeli Singles Chart)	16
Latvia (Latvijas Top 20)	7
Lithuania (M-1)	1
Netherlands (Dutch Top 40)	5
Netherlands (Single Top 100)	7
Norway (VG-lista)	15
Scottish Singles Sales (Official Charts)	6
Sweden (Sverigetopplistan)	18
Switzerland (Schweizer Hitparade)	3
UK Singles (Official Charts)	4
UK Airplay (Music Week)	40
UK Indie (Music Week)	1

=== Year-end charts ===
Chart (1997)	Peak position
Belgium (Ultratop 50 Wallonia)	84
Europe (Eurochart Hot 100)	71
Germany (Media Control)	47
Latvia (Latvijas Top 50)	60
Netherlands (Dutch Top 40)	75
Netherlands (Single Top 100)	86
Switzerland (Schweizer Hitparade)	38
UK Singles (OCC)	136
