= Hey DJ =

Hey DJ may refer to:

- Hey DJ (film), a 2003 American film
- "Hey DJ" (The World's Famous Supreme Team song), 1984
- "Hey DJ" (CNCO song), 2017
- "Hey DJ", a song by Suburban Legends from their EP Dance Like Nobody's Watching
- "Hey DJ! (Play That Song)", a song by N-Tyce from All Day Every Day

== See also ==
- Darhyl Camper, record producer nicknamed "Hey DJ"
- Hey Mr. DJ (disambiguation)
