= Drowning (Backstreet Boys song) =

2001 single by Backstreet Boys

Single by Backstreet Boys

from the album The Hits – Chapter One
- B-side: "Back to Your Heart"
- Released: September 25, 2001
- Recorded: July 1 – September 2000
- Studio: Polar, Cherion (Stockholm, Sweden)
- Genre: Pop
- Length: 4:28
- Label: Jive
- Songwriters: Andreas Carlsson; Linda Thompson; Rami
- Producers: Kristian Lundin; Rami

Backstreet Boys singles chronology
"More than That" (2001)	"Drowning" (2001)	"Incomplete" (2005)

Music video
- "Drowning" on YouTube

"Drowning" is a song by American boy band Backstreet Boys, released on September 25, 2001, as the only single from their compilation album, The Hits – Chapter One.

== Background ==
Written by Andreas Carlsson, Rami and Linda Thompson and produced by Rami and Kristian Lundin, the song "Drowning" was initially recorded for the Backstreet Boys' 2000 Black & Blue album but was excluded due to the limited track listings left. Several elements of the song, such as the piano intro and the chorus, are very similar to "Långsamt farväl" released by the Swedish artist Mauro Scocco in 1997. Andreas Carlsson, co-writer of "Drowning," sang backing vocals on Lisa Nilsson's version of "Långsamt farväl," released in 2003. In Finland, "Drowning" was compared to the 1995 song "Älä sano huomisesta" by Hausmylly.

Country remixes of the song were also recorded, produced by Dann Huff.

== Chart performance ==
The song peaked at number 28 on the US Billboard Hot 100 on November 13, 2001. It reached the top ten in several European countries, reaching number three in Sweden, number four in the UK, and number five in Norway.

== Music videos ==
=== Official version ===
The official music video was directed by Nigel Dick, who directed their music videos for "As Long as You Love Me" and "All I Have to Give."

=== Unreleased version ===
Before the final video was produced, a different concept was in production. The concept was eventually abandoned, and the official video was produced instead. One of the preliminary cuts of this original video was leaked to the public. This video was done, then canceled and replaced by the end of the month.

It features the band members dressed in black outfits, as seen in the photograph on the single cover of the CD. The video was shot mainly using green screen to place the band on an arid salt flat. The sun is initially shining, but dark clouds quickly fill the sky in the first chorus, and it begins to rain in the second verse. A flood of water fills the area, and the storm worsens. At the key change and the song's end, the band members are hit with a large wave. They sing at shallow water depth throughout the rest of the video.

== Track listings ==
UK CD1

1. "Drowning" (short radio edit) – 4:10
2. "Everybody (Backstreet's Back)" (Sharp London vocal mix) – 7:58
3. "I Want It That Way" (Morales club version) – 7:25

UK CD2

1. "Drowning" (radio edit) – 4:13
2. "Drowning" (Dezrok radio mix) – 4:04
3. "Drowning" (Rizzo & Harris radio mix) – 4:02
4. "Drowning" (video) – 4:32

UK cassette single

1. "Drowning" (radio edit) – 4:13
2. "As Long as You Love Me" (Jason Nevins radio mix) – 3:38
3. "All I Have to Give" (Soul Solution club mix) – 7:36

European CD single

1. "Drowning" – 4:25
2. "Back to Your Heart" – 4:21

Australian CD single

1. "Drowning" – 4:25
2. "Back to Your Heart" – 4:21
3. "Shape of My Heart" (video) – 3:50

Japanese CD single

1. "Drowning" (album version)
2. "The One" (album version)
3. "Drowning" (TV track)
4. "The One" (instrumental)

== Personnel ==
- Kristian Lundin – producer, recording engineer, mix engineer
- Rami – producer, recording engineer, mix engineer
- John Amatiello – assistant recording engineer, Pro Tools engineer
- Thomas Lindberg – bass
- Esbjörn Öhrwall – guitar
- Jonathan Lindström – pedal steel guitar
- Tom Coyne – mastering

== Charts ==
=== Weekly charts ===
Weekly chart performance for "Drowning"
Chart (2001–2002)	Peak position
Australia (ARIA)	49
Austria (Ö3 Austria Top 40)	9
Belgium (Ultratop 50 Flanders)	20
Belgium (Ultratip Bubbling Under Wallonia)	4
Canada (Nielsen SoundScan)	11
Canada CHR (Nielsen BDS)	5
Denmark (Tracklisten)	4
Denmark Airplay (Tracklisten)	9
Europe (Eurochart Hot 100)	12
Europe (European Hit Radio)	7
Finland (Suomen virallinen lista)	10
Finland Airplay (Radiosoittolista)	10
Germany (GfK)	11
Ireland (IRMA)	10
Italy (FIMI)	10
Italy (Musica e dischi)	15
Latvia (Latvijas Top 30)	20
Netherlands (Dutch Top 40)	18
Netherlands (Single Top 100)	13
Netherlands Airplay (Music & Media)	13
New Zealand (Recorded Music NZ)	27
Nicaragua (Notimex)	1
Norway (VG-lista)	5
Portugal (AFP)	3
Romania (Romanian Top 100)	10
Scottish Singles Sales (Official Charts)	8
Spain (Promusicae)	5
Spain Airplay (Top 40 Radio)	4
Sweden (Sverigetopplistan)	3
Switzerland (Schweizer Hitparade)	13
UK Singles (Official Charts)	4
UK Airplay (Music Week)	38
UK Indie (Official Charts)	1
US Billboard Hot 100	28
US Adult Contemporary (Billboard)	6
US Adult Pop Airplay (Billboard)	40
US Pop Airplay (Billboard)	12

=== Year-end charts ===
2001 year-end chart performance for "Drowning"
Chart (2001)	Position
Brazil (Crowley)	83
Canada (Nielsen SoundScan)	158
Canada Radio (Nielsen BDS)	71
Netherlands (Single Top 100)	77
Romania (Romanian Top 100)	87
Sweden (Hitlistan)	27
Switzerland (Schweizer Hitparade)	94
Taiwan (Hito Radio)	39
US Mainstream Top 40 (Billboard)	90

2002 year-end chart performance for "Drowning"
Chart (2002)	Position
Canada (Nielsen SoundScan)	141
Canada Radio (Nielsen BDS)	42
US Adult Contemporary (Billboard)	18

== Certifications ==
Certifications and sales for "Drowning"
Region	Certification	Certified units/sales
Australia (ARIA)	Gold	35,000^{‡}
Brazil (Pro-Música Brasil)	Gold	30,000^{‡}
Denmark (IFPI Danmark)	Gold	4,000^{^}
Norway (IFPI Norway)	Gold	
^{^} Shipments figures based on certification alone.^{‡} Sales+streaming figures based on certification alone.

== Release history ==
Release dates and formats for "Drowning"
Region	Date	Format(s)	Label(s)	Ref.
United States	September 25, 2001	Contemporary hit; rhythmic contemporary radio	Jive	
Australia	November 5, 2001	CD	Jive	
United Kingdom	December 31, 2001	CD; cassette	Jive	
Japan	October 23, 2002	CD	Jive	

== In popular culture ==
"Drowning" and another Backstreet Boys single "The One" were both licensed and used in the 2002–2003 anime television series Hanada Shōnen Shi. "Drowning" was used for the ending theme, while "The One" was the opening theme.
