= More than That =

2001 single by Backstreet Boys

Single by Backstreet Boys

from the album Black & Blue
- Released: April 17, 2001
- Studio: Franciz & LePont (Bergshamra, Sweden); EMI (Stockholm, Sweden) (strings); Parc (Orlando, Florida) (vocals); Battery (New York City) (remix)
- Length: 3:44 (album version); 3:42 (radio mix)
- Label: Jive
- Songwriters: Adam Anders; Franciz; LePont
- Producers: Franciz; LePont

Backstreet Boys singles chronology
| "The Call" (2001) | "More than That" (2001) | "Drowning" (2001) |

Audio sample
- A sample from "More than That" by Backstreet Boys: file; help

Music video
- "More than That" on YouTube

"More than That" is a song by American boy band Backstreet Boys. It was released on April 17, 2001, as the third single from their fourth studio album, Black & Blue (2000). The song was written by Adam Anders, Franciz, and LePont and produced by the latter two.

"More than That" reached number 27 on the US Billboard Hot 100 and number 12 on the UK Singles Chart, ending their run of 13 consecutive top-10 hits in the United Kingdom. It entered the top 10 in Canada, Croatia, Poland, and Scotland. The song appears on the band's first compilation album, The Hits – Chapter One (2001).

== Music video ==
The music video for "More than That" was directed by Marcus Raboy. The video features two sets of scenes: one in which the band sings in a desert hangar with a giant movie screen showing various scenes behind them, including a desert, a city with heavy traffic, a cloudy sky, lightning, and a sun break. The other scenes feature the band walking in the desert as a group and driving in two convertible cars. One with AJ McLean as the driver and Nick Carter as the passenger. The other one with Brian Littrell as the driver, Howie Dorough as the passenger, and Kevin Richardson in the backseat.

== Track listings ==
Australian and New Zealand CD single

1. "More Than That" (radio mix) – 3:40
2. "More Than That" (album version) – 3:44
3. "The Call" (Neptunes remix with rap) – 3:53
4. "More Than That" (Hani Mixshow remix) – 6:36
5. "More Than That" (enhanced video) – 3:54

European CD single

1. "More Than That" (radio mix) – 3:40
2. "More Than That" (album version) – 3:44

UK CD and cassette single

1. "More Than That" (radio mix) – 3:40
2. "More Than That" (Hani Mixshow remix) – 6:36
3. "The Call" (Neptunes remix with rap) – 3:53

Japanese CD single

1. "More Than That" (radio mix) – 3:42
2. "More Than That" (album version) – 3:44
3. "The Call" (Neptunes remix with rap) – 3:53
4. "The Call" (Earthtone III remix) – 3:44

== Charts ==
=== Weekly charts ===
| Chart (2001) | Peak position |
|---|---|
| Australia (ARIA) | 25 |
| Austria (Ö3 Austria Top 40) | 27 |
| Belgium (Ultratop 50 Flanders) | 44 |
| Belgium (Ultratip Bubbling Under Wallonia) | 14 |
| Canada CHR (Nielsen BDS) | 5 |
| Croatia (HRT) | 4 |
| Europe (Eurochart Hot 100) | 22 |
| Europe (European Hit Radio) | 19 |
| Germany (GfK) | 25 |
| Ireland (IRMA) | 21 |
| Italy (FIMI) | 25 |
| Italy (Musica e dischi) | 19 |
| Netherlands (Dutch Top 40) | 35 |
| Netherlands (Single Top 100) | 28 |
| New Zealand (Recorded Music NZ) | 29 |
| Poland Airplay (Music & Media) | 1 |
| Poland (PiF PaF) | 2 |
| Romania (Romanian Top 100) | 12 |
| Scottish Singles Sales (Official Charts) | 9 |
| Sweden (Sverigetopplistan) | 11 |
| Switzerland (Schweizer Hitparade) | 28 |
| UK Singles (Official Charts) | 12 |
| UK Indie (Official Charts) | 2 |
| US Billboard Hot 100 | 27 |
| US Adult Contemporary (Billboard) | 6 |
| US Adult Pop Airplay (Billboard) | 34 |
| US Pop Airplay (Billboard) | 14 |

=== Year-end charts ===
| Chart (2001) | Position |
|---|---|
| Brazil (Crowley) | 81 |
| Canada (Nielsen SoundScan) | 149 |
| Canada Radio (Nielsen BDS) | 16 |
| Europe (European Hit Radio) | 93 |
| Romania (Romanian Top 100) | 77 |
| Sweden (Hitlistan) | 92 |
| US Adult Contemporary (Billboard) | 17 |
| US Mainstream Top 40 (Billboard) | 69 |

== Certifications ==
| Region | Certification | Certified units/sales |
|---|---|---|
| Denmark (IFPI Danmark) | Gold | 4,000^{^} |
^{^} Shipments figures based on certification alone.

== Release history ==
| Region | Date | Format(s) | Label(s) | Ref. |
|---|---|---|---|---|
| United States | April 17, 2001 | Contemporary hit; rhythmic contemporary radio | Jive | |
| Europe | June 2001 | CD; cassette | Jive; Trans Continental | |
| Japan | June 6, 2001 | CD | Jive | |
| Australia | June 11, 2001 | CD | Jive; Trans Continental | |
| United Kingdom | June 25, 2001 | CD; cassette | Jive; Trans Continental | |
