= Backstreet Boys (1997 album) =

1997 Backstreet Boys album

Studio album (reissue) by Backstreet Boys
- Released: August 12, 1997
- Recorded: 1994 – May 1997
- Studios: Parc Studios (Orlando, Florida); Cheiron (Stockholm); Battery (New York City); Hit Factory (New York City)
- Genres: R&B; pop; dance-pop; teen pop
- Length: 52:10
- Labels: Jive; Trans Continental
- Producers: Denniz Pop; Max Martin; Kristian Lundin; Veit Renn; Timmy Allen; Full Force; Robert John "Mutt" Lange; Aris; Toni Cottura

Backstreet Boys chronology
| Backstreet's Back (1997) | Backstreet Boys (1997) | Millennium (1999) |

Singles from Backstreet Boys
- 1. "We've Got It Goin' On" Released: September 11, 1995; 2. "Quit Playing Games (With My Heart)" Released: April 15, 1997; 3. "As Long as You Love Me" Released: October 7, 1997; 4. "Everybody (Backstreet's Back)" Released: March 9, 1998; 5. "I'll Never Break Your Heart" Released: June 30, 1998; 6. "All I Have to Give" Released: November 24, 1998

Backstreet Boys is the reissue of the 1996 album of the same name, released by the vocal-pop group Backstreet Boys in the United States on August 12, 1997. Its initial release contains six tracks from their first studio album, Backstreet Boys (1996) and five tracks from their second studio album Backstreet's Back (1997). Released a day after Backstreet's Back, both albums share nearly the same cover but with different titles. The album served as their debut in the United States, where their previous records were not released.

The album became one of their most successful albums and received acclaim from music critics. It peaked at number four on the Billboard 200 albums chart and has been certified 14× platinum (diamond) by the RIAA for sales to retailers, having sold over 14 million copies to date in the United States. The album was reported as the second highest seller in the past fourteen years for Music Club sales as of 2003, selling 1.72 million units.

== Background ==
Backstreet Boys released their first single, "We've Got It Goin' On", in September 1995. While the single was successful across Europe, it stalled in the United States, peaking at number 69. As a result, the original issue of their 1996 debut album was only released outside of the country. Throughout 1996, the group released three more singles internationally: "I'll Never Break Your Heart", "Get Down (You're the One for Me)", and "Quit Playing Games (with My Heart)". Jive Records planned to relaunch the group in the United States in 1997 with the new song "If You Want It to Be Good Girl (Get Yourself a Bad Boy)". The group instead pushed for a US single release of "Quit Playing Games (with My Heart)". The label relented, and following its single release in the United States in April 1997, the song peaked at number 2. By this point, the group had already recorded material for their second studio album, Backstreet's Back, which was released internationally on August 11, 1997. To serve as their debut album in the United States, Jive decided to reissue the group's 1996 debut album with additional tracks from Backstreet's Back.

The original 1997 pressing of the album contains 11 songs—six from the 1996 Backstreet Boys album and five from Backstreet's Back. This version did not include "Everybody (Backstreet's Back)", which was included on Backstreet's Back. The album was reissued for a second time in 1998. The reissue contains the single mixes of "Quit Playing Games (With My Heart)" and "As Long as You Love Me" in addition to an extended version of "Everybody (Backstreet's Back)". For the single version of "Quit Playing Games", the second verse was re-recorded to feature Nick Carter, replacing Brian Littrell's verse from the original version. The single version of "As Long as You Love Me" uses different instrumentation, arrangement, and mixing.

The original pressing of the album had a maroon spine and blue background on the back inlay. The second pressing of the album had a teal spine and a straw-colored background on the back inlay. Both versions of the album contained the same enhanced section, containing videos and other multimedia files.

== Marketing ==
To promote the album the group appeared on Live with Regis and Kathie Lee, Saturday Night Live, MTV, The Ricki Lake Show, The Rosie O'Donnell Show, Soul Train and All That. The group also appeared on Sabrina the Teenage Witch, and a remix of "Hey, Mr. DJ (Keep Playin' This Song)" was included on the show's soundtrack.

== Reception ==
=== Critical reception ===
Professional ratings
Review scores
| Source | Rating |
|---|---|
| AllMusic | 4/5 stars |
| Billboard | Positive |
| Christgau's Consumer Guide | A− |
| NME | 0/10 |
| USA Today | 3/4 stars |

The album received generally positive reviews. Steve Jones of USA Today rated it three stars out of four, commenting that the Backstreet Boys "are confident enough in their voices not to let them get lost in waves of harmonies." Allmusic rated the album four out of five stars, with Stephen Thomas Erlewine calling it "thoroughly enjoyable" and the group "as reliant on their personality as they are their talent". Billboard was complimentary of the different styles presented on the album, regarding "Quit Playing Games" and the lead singles as "lethally catchy" and the cover of "Set Adrift on Memory Bliss" to show "more sophisticated musical leanings". Reviewing it for the NME, Ian Fortnam gave it zero out of ten, and said that the album was "the hollow sound of aural anaemia."

In 2005, Bill Lamb of About.com described the album as "an engaging mix of uptempo dance music and sweet ballads".

=== Commercial performance ===
Backstreet Boys debuted at number 29 on the U.S. Billboard 200 the week of August 30, 1997, with 40,000 copies sold. On January 31, 1998, it peaked at number four on the chart; by this point the album had sold two million copies in the United States. According to Nielsen SoundScan, it was the fifty-second best selling record of 1997 in the United States with 1,300,000 copies sold and the third best selling album of 1998 with 5,700,000 copies sold. The album was certified fourteen times platinum by the RIAA on April 5, 2001, denoting shipments of fourteen million.

As of March 2015, the album had sold 11,687,000 copies in the US according to Nielsen Music. It had sold additional 1.72 million units at the BMG Music Club as of February 2003.

== Track listing ==
1997 original release
| No. | Title | Writer(s) | Producer(s) | Length |
|---|---|---|---|---|
| 1. | "We've Got It Goin' On" | Denniz PoP; Max Martin; Herbert Crichlow | PoP; Martin | 3:40 |
| 2. | "Quit Playing Games (With My Heart)" (original mix) | Martin; Crichlow | Martin; Kristian Lundin | 3:54 |
| 3. | "As Long as You Love Me" (original mix) | Martin | Martin; Lundin | 3:33 |
| 4. | "All I Have to Give" | Full Force | Full Force | 4:35 |
| 5. | "Anywhere for You" | Gary Baker; Wayne Perry | Veit Renn | 4:41 |
| 6. | "Hey, Mr. DJ (Keep Playin' This Song)" | Timmy Allen; Larry Campbell; Jolyon Skinner | Allen; Campbell | 4:25 |
| 7. | "I'll Never Break Your Heart" | Eugene Wilde; Albert Manno | Allen; Renn | 4:48 |
| 8. | "Darlin'" | Timmy Allen; Nneka Morton | Allen | 5:32 |
| 9. | "Get Down (You're the One for Me)" (featuring Smooth T.) | Bülent Aris; Toni Cottura | Aris; Cottura | 3:52 |
| 10. | "Set Adrift on Memory Bliss" | Attrell Cordes; Gary Kemp | P.M. Dawn; Campbell | 3:30 |
| 11. | "If You Want It to Be Good Girl (Get Yourself a Bad Boy)" | Robert John "Mutt" Lange | Lange | 4:48 |

1998 reissue
| No. | Title | Length |
|---|---|---|
| 1. | "We've Got It Goin' On" | 3:40 |
| 2. | "Quit Playing Games (with My Heart)" (single version) | 3:55 |
| 3. | "As Long as You Love Me" (single version) | 3:33 |
| 4. | "Everybody (Backstreet's Back)" (extended version) | 4:48 |
| 5. | "All I Have to Give" | 4:35 |
| 6. | "Anywhere for You" | 4:42 |
| 7. | "Hey, Mr. DJ (Keep Playin' This Song)" | 4:26 |
| 8. | "I'll Never Break Your Heart" | 4:48 |
| 9. | "Darlin'" | 5:31 |
| 10. | "Get Down (You're the One for Me)" (featuring Smooth T.) | 3:52 |
| 11. | "Set Adrift on Memory Bliss" | 3:30 |
| 12. | "If You Want It to Be Good Girl (Get Yourself a Bad Boy)" | 4:49 |

U.S. double sided audio cassette (frontside)
| No. | Title | Length |
|---|---|---|
| 1. | "We've Got It Goin' On" | 3:40 |
| 2. | "Quit Playing Games (with My Heart)" | 3:55 |
| 3. | "As Long as You Love Me" | 3:33 |
| 4. | "All I Have to Give" | 4:35 |
| 5. | "Anywhere for You" | 4:41 |
| 6. | "I'll Never Break Your Heart" | 4:48 |

U.S. double sided audio cassette (backside)
| No. | Title | Length |
|---|---|---|
| 1. | "Everybody (Backstreet's Back)" (extended version; only on 1998 reissue) | 4:48 |
| 2. | "Set Adrift on Memory Bliss" | 3:30 |
| 3. | "Hey Mr. DJ (Keep Playing This Song)" | 4:25 |
| 4. | "Darlin'" | 5:31 |
| 5. | "Get Down (You're the One for Me)" | 3:52 |
| 6. | "If You Want It to Be Good Girl (Get Yourself a Bad Boy)" | 4:49 |

== Charts ==
=== Weekly charts ===
Weekly chart performance for Backstreet Boys
| Chart (1997–1998) | Peak position |
|---|---|
| US Billboard 200 | 4 |

=== Year-end charts ===
Year-end chart performance for Backstreet Boys
| Chart | Year | Position |
|---|---|---|
| US Billboard 200 | 1997 | 141 |
| US Billboard 200 | 1998 | 4 |
| US Billboard 200 | 2000 | 160 |

=== Decade-end charts ===
Decade-end chart performance for Backstreet Boys
| Chart (1990–1999) | Position |
|---|---|
| US Billboard 200 | 10 |

=== All-time charts ===
All-time chart performance for Backstreet Boys
| Chart | Position |
|---|---|
| US Billboard 200 | 42 |

== Certifications ==
Certifications for Backstreet Boys
| Region | Certification | Certified units/sales |
|---|---|---|
| Poland (ZPAV) | 2× Platinum | 40,000^{‡} |
| United States (RIAA) | 14× Platinum | 13,407,000 (Note: As of March 2015, the album has sold 11,687,000 copies in the US according to Nielsen SoundScan, which does not count albums sold through clubs like the BMG Music Club, where it sold 1.72 million units. Combined, it has sold over 13,407,000 copies in the United States.) |
^{‡} Sales+streaming figures based on certification alone.

== See also ==
- List of best-selling albums
- List of best-selling albums in the United States
