= Backstreet Boys (1996 album) =

1996 studio album by Backstreet Boys

Studio album by Backstreet Boys
- Released: May 6, 1996
- Recorded: 1994 – 1996
- Studios: Battery (New York City, New York); Parc & Platinum Post small; (Orlando, Florida); Cheiron & Polar (Stockholm, Sweden)
- Genres: Dance-pop; R&B; pop
- Length: 54:28
- Label: Jive
- Producers: Denniz Pop; Max Martin; Kristian Lundin; Veit Renn; Timmy Allen; Thomas Moore; Aris; Toni Cottura

Backstreet Boys chronology
Backstreet Boys (1996)	Backstreet's Back (1997)

Singles from Backstreet Boys
- 1. "We've Got It Goin' On" Released: September 11, 1995; 2. "I'll Never Break Your Heart" Released: December 4, 1995; 3. "Get Down (You're the One for Me)" Released: April 30, 1996; 4. "Quit Playing Games (with My Heart)" Released: October 14, 1996; 5. "Anywhere for You" Released: February 24, 1997

Professional ratings
Review scores
Source	Rating
AllMusic	4/5 stars
The Guardian	3/5 stars
Music Week	4/5 stars
The Rolling Stone Album Guide	2.5/5 stars

Backstreet Boys is the debut studio album by American boy band Backstreet Boys, first released in Germany on May 6, 1996, by Jive Records. The first single released from the album was "We've Got It Goin' On". Further singles from the album were "I'll Never Break Your Heart", "Get Down (You're the One for Me)", "Quit Playing Games (with My Heart)", and "Anywhere for You". The album has sold over 10 million copies worldwide.

While the single "We've Got It Goin' On" was a success in Europe, it was not a hit in the United States. As a result, Backstreet Boys was only initially released outside of the country. Following the success of "Quit Playing Games (with My Heart)" in the United States, the album was reissued in 1997 under the same name and released as their debut in the country. The reissue also includes songs from the band's second album release Backstreet's Back (1997).

== Track listing ==
Standard edition
No.	Title	Writer(s)	Producer(s)	Length
1.	"We've Got It Goin' On"	Denniz PoP, Max Martin, Herbie Crichlow	Denniz PoP, Martin	3:39
2.	"Anywhere for You"	Gary Baker, Wayne Perry	Veit Renn	4:40
3.	"Get Down (You're the One for Me)"	Bülent Aris, Toni Cottura	Aris, Cottura	3:50
4.	"I'll Never Break Your Heart"	Albert Manno, Eugene Wilde	Renn, Timmy Allen	4:48
5.	"Quit Playin' Games (with My Heart)"	Martin, Crichlow	Martin, Kristian Lundin	3:52
6.	"Boys Will Be Boys"	Jolyon Skinner, Renn	Renn, Mr. Lee^{[a]}	4:06
7.	"Just to Be Close to You"	Tim Grant, Michael Gray	Allen, Mookie^{[b]}	4:49
8.	"I Wanna Be with You"	Denniz PoP, Martin	Denniz PoP, Martin	4:04
9.	"Every Time I Close My Eyes"	Eric Foster White	Allen, Kay Fingers	3:55
10.	"Darlin'"	Allen, Nneka Morton	Allen	5:31
11.	"Let's Have a Party"	Mookie, Dave McPherson, Jeff Sledge, Kenyatta Galbreth, C.J. Trevett, Kenneth Gamble, Leon Huff	Mookie, Allen^{[b]}	3:49
12.	"Roll with It"	Skinner, Renn	Renn, Mr. Lee^{[a]}, Mad Mike^{[a]}	4:41
13.	"Nobody But You"	Denniz PoP, Martin, Crichlow	Denniz PoP, Martin	3:03

Australian collector's edition
No.	Title	Writer(s)	Length
14.	"I'll Never Break Your Heart" (European radio edit)	Manno, Wilde	4:25
15.	"Album Medley (Anywhere for You / I'll Never Break Your Heart / Just to Be Close to You)"	Baker, Perry / Manno, Wilde / Grant, Gray	4:12
16.	"Quit Playing Games (with My Heart)" (acoustic version)	Martin, Crichlow	3:58
17.	"We've Got It Goin' On" (Markus' Deadly Vocal Hot Mix)	Denniz PoP, Martin, Crichlow	6:39
18.	"Don't Leave Me"	Sean Combs, Mookie, Alvin Toney, Harry Wayne Casey, Craig Mack, Easy Mo Bee	4:22

European edition/Netherlands special edition
No.	Title	Writer(s)	Length
14.	"Don't Leave Me"	Combs, Mookie, Toney, Harry Wayne Casey, Mack, Easy Mo Bee	4:22
15.	"We've Got It Goin' On" (Marcus Radio Mix)	Denniz PoP, Martin, Crichlow	4:32
16.	"I Wanna Be with You" (Amadin's Club Mix)	Denniz PoP, Martin	5:24

Japanese edition
No.	Title	Writer(s)	Length
14.	"Lay Down Beside Me"	Renn, Skinner	5:26
15.	"Give Me Your Heart"	Larry Campbell	5:08

United Kingdom special edition
No.	Title	Writer(s)	Length
14.	"Don't Leave Me"	Combs, Mookie, Toney, Harry Wayne Casey, Mack, Easy Mo Beee	4:22
15.	"Give Me Your Heart"	Larry Campbell	5:08
16.	"Lay Down Beside Me"	Renn, Skinner	5:26

Canadian edition
No.	Title	Writer(s)	Length
1.	"We've Got It Goin' On"	Denniz PoP, Martin, Crichlow	3:39
2.	"Get Down (You're the One for Me)"	Aris, Cottura	3:50
3.	"I'll Never Break Your Heart"	Manno, Wilde	4:48
4.	"Quit Playing Games (with My Heart)"	Martin, Crichlow	3:52
5.	"Boys Will Be Boys"	Renn, Skinner	4:06
6.	"Just to Be Close to You"	Grant, Gray	4:49
7.	"I Wanna Be with You"	Denniz PoP, Martin	4:04
8.	"Every Time I Close My Eyes"	White	3:55
9.	"Darlin"	Allen, Morton	5:31
10.	"Roll with It"	Renn, Skinner	4:41

Notes

- ^{^[a]} signifies remix and additional production
- ^{^[b]} signifies co-production

Additional tracks

- The Italy limited edition includes "Non Puoi Lasciarmi Così" (the Italian version of "Quit Playing Games With My Heart")
- The Spain/Latin America limited edition includes Donde Quieras Yo Iré (the Spanish version of "Anywhere for You") and "Nunca Te Haré Llorar" (the Spanish version of "I'll Never Break Your Heart")

Sample credits

- "Boys Will Be Boys" contains elements of "Sing a Simple Song" written by Sly Stone and performed by Sly and the Family Stone.
- "Let's Have a Party" contains elements of "Enjoy Yourself" written by Kenneth Gamble and Leon Huff and performed by The Jacksons.
- "Don't Leave Me" contains samples of "Flava in Ya Ear" written and performed by Craig Mack and "Please Don't Go" written by Harry Wayne Casey and Richard Finch and performed by KC and the Sunshine Band.

== Charts ==
=== Weekly charts ===
Chart (1996–1998)	Peak position
Australian Albums (ARIA)	6
Austrian Albums (Ö3 Austria)	1
Belgian Albums (Ultratop Flanders)	6
Belgian Albums (Ultratop Wallonia)	8
Canadian Albums (Billboard)	1
Czech Albums (IFPI CR)	5
Danish Albums (Hitlisten)	4
Dutch Albums (Album Top 100)	7
Estonian Albums (Eesti Top 10)	4
European Albums Chart	7
Finnish Albums (Suomen virallinen lista)	5
German Albums (Offizielle Top 100)	1
Greek Albums (IFPI Greece)	4
Hungarian Albums (MAHASZ)	1
Icelandic Albums (Tonlist)	2
Irish Albums (IRMA)	16
Italian Albums (FIMI)	2
Italian Albums (Musica e Dischi)	11
Japanese Albums (Oricon)	54
Malaysian Albums (IFPI)	2
New Zealand Albums (RMNZ)	15
Norwegian Albums (VG-lista)	19
Portuguese Albums (AFP)	2
Scottish Albums (Official Charts)	23
Singapore Albums (SPVA)	3
Spanish Albums (Promusicae)	2
Swedish Albums (Sverigetopplistan)	7
Swiss Albums (Schweizer Hitparade)	1
Taiwanese Albums (IFPI)	1
UK Albums (Official Charts)	12
Zimbabwean Albums (ZIMA)	3

=== Year-end charts ===
Chart (1996)	Position
Austrian Albums (Ö3 Austria)	4
Canadian Albums (RPM)	17
Dutch Albums (Album Top 100)	22
Estonian Albums (Eesti Top 10)	10
European Albums (Music & Media)	16
German Albums (Offizielle Top 100)	5
Swedish Albums (Sverigetopplistan)	24
Swiss Albums (Schweizer Hitparade)	4
Chart (1997)	Position
Australian Albums (ARIA)	68
Austrian Albums (Ö3 Austria)	9
Belgian Albums (Ultratop Flanders)	55
Belgian Albums (Ultratop Wallonia)	34
Canadian Albums (Nielsen Soundscan)	8
Dutch Albums (Album Top 100)	23
European Albums (Music & Media)	15
German Albums (Offizielle Top 100)	21
Spanish Albums (PROMUSICAE)	9
Swiss Albums (Schweizer Hitparade)	15
Chart (1998)	Position
Australian Albums (ARIA)	55
Italian Albums (Musica e dischi)	76

== Certifications and sales ==
Region	Certification	Certified units/sales
Argentina (CAPIF)	3× Platinum	180,000^{^}
Australia (ARIA)	Platinum	70,000^{^}
Austria (IFPI Austria)	3× Platinum	150,000^{*}
Belgium (BRMA)	Platinum	50,000^{*}
Brazil (Pro-Música Brasil)	Platinum	250,000^{*}
Canada (Music Canada)	Diamond	1,000,000^{^}
Denmark (IFPI Danmark)	Platinum	50,000^{^}
Finland (Musiikkituottajat)	Gold	21,930
France (SNEP)	Gold	100,000^{*}
Germany (BVMI)	Platinum	500,000^{^}
Hong Kong (IFPI Hong Kong)	Platinum	20,000^{*}
Japan (RIAJ)	Gold	100,000^{^}
Malaysia	—	200,000
Mexico (AMPROFON)	Gold	100,000^{^}
Netherlands (NVPI)	2× Platinum	200,000^{^}
New Zealand (RMNZ)	Platinum	15,000^{^}
Norway (IFPI Norway)	Platinum	75,000
Poland (ZPAV)	Platinum	100,000^{*}
Singapore	—	10,000
Spain (Promusicae)	4× Platinum	400,000^{^}
Sweden (GLF)	Platinum	100,000^{^}
Switzerland (IFPI Switzerland)	3× Platinum	150,000^{^}
United Kingdom (BPI)	Platinum	300,000^{‡}
Summaries
Europe (IFPI)	3× Platinum	3,000,000^{*}
Southeast Asia	—	1,300,000
^{*} Sales figures based on certification alone.^{^} Shipments figures based on certification alone.^{‡} Sales+streaming figures based on certification alone.

== Release history ==
Country	Release date
Europe	May 6, 1996
Canada	September 2, 1996
United Kingdom	October 1, 1996
