= I'll Never Break Your Heart =

1995 single by Backstreet Boys

- Artwork for early 1995–96 European release

Single by Backstreet Boys

from the album Backstreet Boys (international and US)
- B-side: "Roll with It"
- Released: December 4, 1995
- Studio: Parc, Platinum Post (Orlando, Florida)
- Genre: R&B
- Length: 4:48 (LP version); 4:25 (radio edit)
- Label: Jive
- Songwriters: Eugene Wilde; Albert Manno
- Producers: Veit Renn; Timmy Allen

Backstreet Boys singles chronology
"We've Got It Goin' On" (1995)	"I'll Never Break Your Heart" (1995)	"Get Down (You're the One for Me)" (1996)

Backstreet Boys US singles chronology
"Everybody (Backstreet's Back)" (1998)	"I'll Never Break Your Heart" (1998)	"All I Have to Give" (1998)

Alternate cover
- Artwork for 1998 re-release

Music video
- "I'll Never Break Your Heart" on YouTube

"I'll Never Break Your Heart" is a song by American boy band Backstreet Boys. The song was written by singer-songwriters Eugene Wilde and Albert Manno and produced by Veit Renn and Timmy Allen. It was released in the United Kingdom on December 4, 1995, by Jive Records as the second single from their self-titled debut album and was issued across the rest of Europe later the same month. It was later included on their US debut album and was released as their fourth US single in June 1998. Two different music videos were released for the song, in 1995 and 1998.

== Background ==
The song "I'll Never Break Your Heart" replaced "I'll Never Find Someone Like You" on the Backstreet Boys' first self-titled international album, which was to be the group's first single. The group's label Jive Records had not committed to using the song for the group, and as a result, it was offered to singer Keith Martin who accepted it and released it as a single on the 1995 Bad Boys soundtrack and his album It's Long Overdue, the same year. Brian Littrell discovered this when he heard Martin's song play on the radio one day.

"I'll Never Break Your Heart" was supposedly recorded over two weeks because Littrell and AJ McLean, the two lead vocalists on the song, had colds. In an interview with Billboard in 2017, McLean stated that the song "was the longest recording for any single BSB record in Backstreet history", as they had to manually rewind the tape to add brand new vocals in the track while they were sick.

In October 2014, the group took ownership of the master recording of the song as part of a settlement agreement with their ex-manager, Lou Pearlman's bankruptcy estate.

== Critical reception ==
Pan-European magazine Music & Media wrote, "With the up-tempo, infectious 'We've Got It Goin' On' still in the Benelux, German and Swiss top 10, the Backstreet Boys slowed their crystal clear vocals down to make one of those smooth R&B ballads which are typically aimed for the US market." A reviewer from Music Week gave it a score of four out of five, adding, "The soppiness factor is into full effect on this romantic ballad, which displays the boys' vocal excellence. A November tour will help this become another top-five hit." Chuck Arnold from People Magazine said that Backstreet Boys gave their "smoothest Boyz II Men impression" on this R&B ballad, adding that "they make you believe every word of their vow to do no harm." Also Jordan Paramor from Smash Hits gave it four out of five, writing, "The Backstreet Boys go all Boys II Men-ish on us, with lyrics soppier than a room full of Labrador puppies wearing frilly pink dresses. I'll never make you cry/I'd rather die than live without you they wibble harmoniously, displaying voices that would make an earthquake shake with pride."

== Commercial performance ==
The song was first released in the United Kingdom and Europe in December 1995, then in 1996 for a few other markets, including a UK re-issue in November. It was subsequently serviced to US radio in June 1998. Following a physical released on July 21, 1998, the song peaked at number 35 on the Billboard Hot 100. It fared better on the Adult Contemporary chart, where it became the group's first number-one song on this ranking. Outside the US, the song peaked at number eight on the UK Singles Chart and also reached the top 10 in Australia, Germany, the Netherlands, Sweden, and Switzerland.

== Music videos ==
Two music videos were released for "I'll Never Break Your Heart."

The first music video aired in December 1995, for Germany, France, and other nations in Western Europe. The video follows a group of girls, one of whom has recently broken up with her boyfriend, as stated in the introduction. The band members are on a ski vacation, and each partners up with one of the girls. Brian Littrell gets together with the girl who had just broken up with her boyfriend. The girl Kevin Richardson is matched with was his then-girlfriend and now-wife Kristin Willits, as she was asked by the director Lionel C. Martin to be featured in the video as an extra. The group had not skied before or seen snow and would constantly fall off after the cameras stopped rolling. This original video was filmed in November 1995 in Snowbird, Utah.

The second video, directed by Bille Woodruff, was released to MTV in June 1998 for the US market. It has amassed more than 59 million views on YouTube as of September 2021 and is the most well-known of the two versions. A video version of the song was also released for the Spanish version. The video features each band member singing in their own uniquely styled apartment which is stacked atop one another in a tall building. Late in the video, each member is shown to have a girl in their apartment. The group is also shown singing together in a cylindrical tunnel with a rotating round porthole near the end, through which the camera observes. The dog in Littrell's apartment was his dog, and the girl in his apartment was his then-girlfriend, now-wife Leighanne Wallace.

== Other versions ==
The Spanish version of the song, titled "Nunca Te Haré Llorar," ("I'll Never Make You Cry") was later recorded in Zürich along with a Spanish version of "Anywhere for You." The idea came after they had started gaining success in Spanish countries such as Mexico and Spain. The label suggested they created Spanish versions to dedicate to those countries. Andy Williams released a version in 2007 on his album, I Don't Remember Ever Growing Up. The video for the Spanish version was shot directly after the English video for the US market.

== Track listings ==
=== United Kingdom ===
- Original
1. "I'll Never Break Your Heart" (Radio Edit) - 4:25
2. "I'll Never Break Your Heart" (LP Version) - 4:49
3. "Roll with It" [alternate version] - 4:43
- Re-release CD1
1. "I'll Never Break Your Heart" (Radio Edit) - 4:25
2. "We've Got It Goin' On" (Amadin's Club Mix) - 6:33
3. "Mark Goodier Interview" (Part 1)
- Re-release CD2
1. "I'll Never Break Your Heart" (Radio Edit) - 4:25
2. "Roll with It" - 4:43
3. "Mark Goodier Interview" (Part 2)
- Cassette
1. "I'll Never Break Your Heart" (Radio Edit) - 4:25
2. "Roll with It" - 4:43

=== United States ===
- CD
1. "I'll Never Break Your Heart" (radio edit) - 4:25
2. "I'll Never Break Your Heart" (LP version) - 4:49
3. "I'll Never Break Your Heart" (Spanglish version) - 4:48
4. "Nunca Te Hare Llorar (I'll Never Break Your Heart)" (Spanish version) - 4:44
5. "I'll Never Break Your Heart" (instrumental) - 4:25

== Credits and personnel ==
- Produced by Veit Renn and Timmy Allen
- All Instruments by Veit Renn and Timmy Allen
- Mixed by Chris Trevett at Battery Studios
- Recorded by Joe Smith at Parc Studios and Platinum Post Studios, Orlando

== Charts ==
=== Weekly charts ===
Chart (1995–1998)	Peak position
Australia (ARIA)	10
Austria (Ö3 Austria Top 40)	5
Belgium (Ultratop 50 Flanders)	4
Belgium (Ultratop 50 Wallonia)	8
Canada Top Singles (RPM)	47
Canada Adult Contemporary (RPM)	14
Denmark (IFPI)	17
Europe (Eurochart Hot 100)	7
Europe (European AC Radio)	20
Europe (European Dance Radio)	3
Europe (European Hit Radio)	32
Europe (Atlantic Crossovers)	12
Germany (GfK)	5
Iceland (Íslenski Listinn Topp 40)	29
Ireland (IRMA)	19
Netherlands (Dutch Top 40)	3
Netherlands (Single Top 100)	3
New Zealand (Recorded Music NZ)	11
Scottish Singles Sales (Official Charts)	40
Scottish Singles Sales (Official Charts); 1996 re-release	11
Spain Airplay (Top 40 Radio)	10
Sweden (Sverigetopplistan)	7
Switzerland (Schweizer Hitparade)	2
UK Singles (Official Charts)	42
UK Singles (Official Charts); 1996 re-release	8
UK Airplay (Music Week)	20
UK Indie (Music Week)	1
US Billboard Hot 100	35
US Adult Contemporary (Billboard)	1
US Adult Pop Airplay (Billboard)	28
US Pop Airplay (Billboard)	4

=== Year-end charts ===
Chart (1996)	Position
Austria (Ö3 Austria Top 40)	31
Belgium (Ultratop 50 Flanders)	30
Belgium (Ultratop 50 Wallonia)	43
Europe (Eurochart Hot 100)	41
Germany (Media Control)	32
Netherlands (Dutch Top 40)	35
Netherlands (Single Top 100)	23
Sweden (Topplistan)	52
Switzerland (Schweizer Hitparade)	12

Chart (1998)	Position
Australia (ARIA)	33
Canada Adult Contemporary (RPM)	44
US Adult Contemporary (Billboard)	17
US Adult Top 40 (Billboard)	75
US Mainstream Top 40 (Billboard)	30
US Rhythmic Top 40 (Billboard)	46

Chart (1999)	Position
US Adult Contemporary (Billboard)	16

== Certifications ==
Region	Certification	Certified units/sales
Australia (ARIA)	Platinum	70,000^{‡}
Germany (BVMI)	Gold	250,000^{^}
^{^} Shipments figures based on certification alone.^{‡} Sales+streaming figures based on certification alone.

== Release history ==
Region	Date	Format(s)	Label(s)	Ref.
United Kingdom	December 4, 1995	12-inch vinyl; CD; cassette	Jive	
Europe	December 13, 1995	CD single	Jive	
Europe	February 12, 1996	Maxi-CD single	Jive	
United Kingdom (re-release)	November 4, 1996	7-inch vinyl; CD; cassette	Jive	
United States	June 30, 1998	Rhythmic contemporary; contemporary hit radio	Jive	
United States	July 21, 1998	CD single	Jive	

== See also ==
- List of Billboard Adult Contemporary number ones of 1998
