= All I Have to Give =

1998 single by Backstreet Boys

Single by Backstreet Boys

from the album Backstreet's Back and Backstreet Boys (US)
- Released: January 13, 1998
- Studio: Battery (New York City); Parc (Orlando, Florida)
- Genre: Pop; R&B
- Length: 4:36 (album version); 4:06 (radio version)
- Label: Jive
- Songwriters: Full Force (Brian George, Junior Clark, Paul Anthony George, Lucien George Jr., Curt Bedeau, Gerry Charles)
- Producer: Full Force

Backstreet Boys singles chronology
"As Long as You Love Me" (1997)	"All I Have to Give" (1998)	"I Want It That Way" (1999)

Backstreet Boys US singles chronology
"I'll Never Break Your Heart" (1998)	"All I Have to Give" (1998)	"I Want It That Way" (1999)

Alternate cover
- 1999 US single release

Music video
- "All I Have to Give" on YouTube

"All I Have to Give" is a song by American boy band Backstreet Boys, produced and written by Full Force. It was released in January 1998 by Jive Records as the third and final single from the band's second album, Backstreet's Back (1997), and the sixth and final single from their US debut album. The song debuted and peaked at number two on the UK Singles Chart as well as peaking at number five on the US Billboard Hot 100, becoming their third top-10 single in the US, following "Everybody (Backstreet's Back)". Nigel Dick directed the accompanying music video for the song.

== Background ==
Alongside working with Max Martin for their second album, Backstreet's Back, the Backstreet Boys began collaborating with Full Force in late 1996 as a way to differentiate themselves from the pop and R&B genre. In a 2017 interview with Billboard, Howie Dorough discussed how the song was particularly significant to him:

My sound wasn't exactly the lead-person sound for the group with these songs. "All I Have To Give" was me finally getting a chance to step to the plate and show the world who I am as a singer. I'll always be thankful for producers from the group Full Force for saying, "Dude, why don't you sing more on the leads?"

== Critical reception ==
Chuck Taylor of Billboard magazine noted that "All I Have to Give" contained "plush harmonies, a melody that seems altogether natural and familiar on the first listen, and clever production props", describing it as a "no-brainer ballad" that would treat the Backstreet Boys more seriously as men. Scottish Daily Record described the song as a "classic slice of teen-pop", stating that the Backstreet Boys were "eclipsing Boyzone". Music Week gave it three out of five, stating that the boy band "who currently cannot put a foot wrong are set for a third big hit" with the "radio-friendly Full Force-penned ballad which features all five members sharing lead vocals." People magazine described "All I Have to Give" as a "peppy" ballad, stating that while the song contained "a tinge of melancholy in the group's harmonies, one can't help smiling". Bob Waliszewski of Plugged In found that the song expresses a "willingness to do whatever it takes to forge a strong relationship".

== Commercial performance ==
"All I Have to Give" charted in the top ten in several countries, including a debut at number 2 on the UK Singles Chart, number three in Canada, number four in Australia, and number eight in Germany in 1998. It reached number one in Spain and on the UK Indie Chart. In the US, the song reached number five on the Billboard Hot 100 on February 6, 1999. It has since been certified Platinum in the US and Australia, Gold in New Zealand and Sweden, and Silver in the UK.

== Music video ==
=== Background ===
The music video for "All I Have to Give" was directed by British director Nigel Dick and released in 1998. It uses the song's radio edit, omitting the latter half of the song's bridge. As of April 2021, the video has over 51 million views on YouTube.

=== Synopsis ===
The Backstreet Boys perform in various interior locations throughout the music video while wearing different outfits. These include a circular wall, a brown stage, a bar in front of a steel structure, and a blue-lit room. During the verse, every band member is seen singing in front of a microphone while wearing urban clothing; Nick Carter and Brian Littrell sing the first two verses while Howie Dorough and AJ McLean perform the following two verses. During the chorus, they simultaneously perform a "hat dance" while wearing a fedora and multicolored-collar suits throughout the choreography.

== Track listings ==
- US CD single
1. "All I Have to Give" (album version) – 4:36
2. "All I Have to Give" (Part II—The Conversation Mix) – 4:15
- US maxi-CD single
1. "All I Have to Give (album version) – 4:36
2. "All I Have to Give (Part II—The Conversation Mix) – 4:15
3. "All I Have to Give (Davidson Ospina Radio Mix) – 4:22
4. "All I Have to Give (Soul Solution Radio Mix) – 3:40
5. "Quit Playing Games (with My Heart)" (live version) – 6:08
- UK and European CD1 single
1. "All I Have to Give" (radio version) – 4:06
2. "Quit Playing Games (with My Heart)" (live version) – 6:12
3. "All I Have to Give" (The Conversation Mix) – 4:15
4. "As Long as You Love Me" (Peppermint Jam Remix) – 3:42
- UK and European CD2 single
1. "All I Have to Give" (radio version) – 4:06
2. "We've Got It Goin' On" (CL's Anthem Radio Mix) – 4:12
3. "Get Down (You're the One for Me)" (Markus Plastik Vocal) – 6:33
4. "Quit Playing Games (with My Heart)" (E-Smoove Extended Vocal Version Mix) – 6:48
- Japanese enhanced CD single (EP)
1. "All I Have to Give" (radio version)
2. "Everybody (Backstreet's Back)" (7-inch version)
3. "I'll Never Break Your Heart" (radio edit)
4. "As Long as You Love Me" (radio version)
5. "Everybody (Backstreet's Back)" (instrumental)
6. "I'll Never Break Your Heart" (instrumental)
7. "As Long as You Love Me" (Pepperment Jam Remix)

== Charts ==
=== Weekly charts ===
Chart (1998–1999)	Peak position
Australia (ARIA)	4
Austria (Ö3 Austria Top 40)	4
Belgium (Ultratop 50 Flanders)	14
Belgium (Ultratop 50 Wallonia)	17
Canada (Nielsen SoundScan)	3
Canada Top Singles (RPM)	18
Canada Adult Contemporary (RPM)	22
Croatia (HRT)	6
Estonia (Eesti Top 20)	1
Europe (Eurochart Hot 100)	6
Europe (European Hit Radio)	4
Finland (Suomen virallinen lista)	10
Finland Airplay (Radiosoittolista)	15
Germany (GfK)	8
Hungary (Mahasz)	1
Iceland (Íslenski Listinn Topp 40)	7
Ireland (IRMA)	6
Italy (FIMI)	2
Italy (Musica e dischi)	12
Italy Airplay (Music & Media)	2
Japan (Oricon)	39
Latvia (Latvijas Top 20)	1
Netherlands (Dutch Top 40)	5
Netherlands (Single Top 100)	7
Netherlands Airplay (Music & Media)	8
New Zealand (Recorded Music NZ)	3
Norway (VG-lista)	14
Scottish Singles Sales (Official Charts)	2
Spain (AFYVE)	1
Spain Airplay (Top 40 Radio)	15
Sweden (Sverigetopplistan)	6
Switzerland (Schweizer Hitparade)	8
UK Singles (Official Charts)	2
UK Airplay (Music Week)	6
UK Indie (Official Charts)	1
US Billboard Hot 100	5
US Adult Contemporary (Billboard)	8
US Adult Pop Airplay (Billboard)	30
US Dance Singles Sales (Billboard)	3
US Pop Airplay (Billboard)	7
US Rhythmic Airplay (Billboard)	19
Zimbabwe (ZIMA)	1

Chart (2025)	Peak position
Russia Streaming (TopHit)	100

=== Monthly charts ===
Chart (2025)	Peak position
Russia Streaming (TopHit)	93

=== Year-end charts ===
Chart (1998)	Position
Australia (ARIA)	32
Belgium (Ultratop 50 Wallonia)	81
Canada Top Singles (RPM)	64
Europe (Eurochart Hot 100)	51
Europe (European Hit Radio)	34
Germany (Media Control)	70
Italy (Musica e dischi)	75
Latvia (Latvijas Top 50)	24
Netherlands (Dutch Top 40)	88
Netherlands (Single Top 100)	66
New Zealand (RIANZ)	25
Sweden (Hitlistan)	46
UK Singles (OCC)	96

Chart (1999)	Position
US Billboard Hot 100	25
US Adult Contemporary (Billboard)	25
US Mainstream Top 40 (Billboard)	42
US Maxi-Singles Sales (Billboard)	23
US Rhythmic Top 40 (Billboard)	57

== Certifications ==
Region	Certification	Certified units/sales
Australia (ARIA)	Platinum	70,000^{^}
New Zealand (RMNZ)	Gold	5,000^{*}
Sweden (GLF)	Gold	15,000^{^}
United Kingdom (BPI)	Silver	200,000^{^}
United States (RIAA)	Platinum	900,000
^{*} Sales figures based on certification alone.^{^} Shipments figures based on certification alone.

== Release history ==
Region	Date	Format(s)	Label(s)	Ref.
Europe	January 13, 1998	CD	Jive	
United Kingdom	February 2, 1998	CD; cassette	Jive	
Japan	July 8, 1998	CD	Jive	
United States	November 24, 1998	Rhythmic contemporary; contemporary hit radio	Jive	
United States	December 8, 1998	CD	Jive	
