= Backstreet's Back =

1997 Backstreet Boys album

Studio album by Backstreet Boys
- Released: August 11, 1997
- Recorded: October 1996 – June 1997
- Studios: Parc Studios (Orlando, Florida); Cheiron and Polar Studios (Stockholm, Sweden); Battery Studios and The Hit Factory (New York City, New York); Sigma Sound; (Philadelphia, Pennsylvania)
- Genres: Dance-pop; teen pop
- Length: 46:18
- Labels: Jive; Trans Continental
- Producers: Timmy Allen; Larry Campbell; P.M. Dawn; Full Force; Robert John "Mutt" Lange; Brian Littrell; Kristian Lundin; Max Martin; Mookie; Denniz PoP; "Fitz" Gerald Scott

Backstreet Boys chronology
Backstreet Boys (1996)	Backstreet's Back (1997)	Backstreet Boys (1997)

Singles from Backstreet's Back
- 1. "Everybody (Backstreet's Back)" Released: July 14, 1997; 2. "As Long as You Love Me" Released: September 29, 1997; 3. "All I Have to Give" Released: January 13, 1998

Professional ratings
Review scores
Source	Rating
AllMusic	4/5 stars
Christgau's Consumer Guide	(choice cut)
Music Week	4/5 stars

Backstreet's Back is the second studio album by American boy band Backstreet Boys, released on August 11, 1997, by Jive Records and Trans Continental Records, appearing in most countries except the United States. The album served as one of two follow-ups to the group's debut Backstreet Boys, which came out a year prior. A day after Backstreet's Back came out for most of the world, a United States–exclusive album was released with the same title as the group's debut: Backstreet Boys—a hybrid reissue containing a revised track list and additional songs from Backstreet's Back.

The first track recorded for the album was a cover of "Set Adrift on Memory Bliss". The tracks "If You Stay" and "Who Do You Love" were recorded for the album but were ultimately not included; the latter was performed live but never released as a studio track. The three singles released from Backstreet's Back: "Everybody (Backstreet's Back)", "As Long as You Love Me", and "All I Have to Give" became three of their most successful singles.

== Commercial performance ==
Backstreet's Back debuted at #1 in Canada, selling 67,000 copies in its first week. By 2007, the album had sold over 1,048,000 copies in Canada.

The album was their first of two to top the European Albums Chart where it stayed for one week.

== Track listing ==
UK, Europe and Australian edition
No.	Title	Writer(s)	Producer(s)	Length
1.	"Everybody (Backstreet's Back)"	Denniz PoP; Max Martin	Denniz PoP; Max Martin	3:44
2.	"As Long as You Love Me"	Martin	Martin; Kristian Lundin	3:40
3.	"All I Have to Give"	Full Force	Full Force	4:37
4.	"That's the Way I Like It"	PoP; Martin; Herbert Crichlow	PoP; Martin	3:40
5.	"10,000 Promises"	Martin	PoP; Martin	4:00
6.	"Like a Child"	"Fitz" Gerald Scott	"Fitz" Gerald Scott	5:05
7.	"Hey, Mr. DJ (Keep Playin' This Song)"	Timmy Allen; Larry Campbell; Jolyon Skinner	Timmy Allen; Larry "Rock" Campbell	4:25
8.	"Set Adrift on Memory Bliss"	Attrell Cordes; Gary Kemp	P.M. Dawn; Campbell	3:40
9.	"That's What She Said"	Brian Littrell	Mookie; Brian Littrell	4:05
10.	"If You Want It to Be Good Girl (Get Yourself a Bad Boy)"	Robert John Lange	Robert John "Mutt" Lange	4:47
11.	"If I Don't Have You"	Gary Baker; Wayne Perry; Allen	Allen; Campbell	4:35

Canadian edition
No.	Title	Writer(s)	Producer(s)	Length
10.	"Anywhere for You"	Baker; Perry	Veit Renn	4:42
11.	"If You Want It to Be Good Girl (Get Yourself a Bad Boy)"	Lange	Lange	4:47
12.	"If I Don't Have You"	Baker; Perry; Allen	Allen; Campbell	4:35

Asia, Japan and Australian "Christmas" edition
No.	Title	Writer(s)	Producer(s)	Length
1.	"Everybody (Backstreet's Back)"	PoP; Martin	PoP; Martin	3:44
2.	"As Long as You Love Me"	Martin	Martin; Lundin	3:40
3.	"All I Have to Give"	Full Force	Full Force	4:37
4.	"Missing You"	Tetsuya "TK" Komuro; Skinner	Per Magnusson; David Kreuger; Tetsuya "TK" Komuro (co.)	4:31
5.	"That's the Way I Like It"	PoP; Martin; Crichlow	PoP; Martin	3:40
6.	"10,000 Promises"	Martin	PoP; Martin	4:00
7.	"Like a Child"	Scott	Scott	5:05
8.	"Hey, Mr. D.J. (Keep Playin' This Song)"	Allen; Campbell; Skinner	Allen; Campbell	4:25
9.	"Set Adrift on Memory Bliss"	Cordes; Kemp	P.M. Dawn; Campbell	3:40
10.	"That's What She Said"	Littrell	Mookie; Littrell	4:05
11.	"If You Want It to Be Good Girl (Get Yourself a Bad Boy)"	Lange	Lange	4:47
12.	"All I Have to Give" (Part II – The Conversation Mix)	Full Force	Full Force	4:16
13.	"If I Don't Have You"	Baker; Perry; Allen	Allen; Campbell	4:35

Japanese bonus track
No.	Title	Writer(s)	Producer(s)	Length
14.	"Everybody (Backstreet's Back)" (Matty's Club Mix)	PoP; Martin	PoP; Martin	6:25

Asian and Australian "Christmas" edition bonus disc
No.	Title	Writer(s)	Producer(s)	Length
1.	"Backstreet Boys Interview"			11:23
2.	"Christmas Time"	Johnny Wright; Veit Renn; Joe Smith	Renn; Joe Smith (co.)	4:07
3.	"As Long as You Love Me" (Unplugged version)	Martin	Martin; Lundin	3:32
4.	"Quit Playing Games (with My Heart)" (E-Smoove Vocal Mix)	Martin; Crichlow	Martin; Lundin	6:47

Notes

- "Set Adrift on Memory Bliss" contains an interpolation of "True" written by Gary Kemp and performed by Spandau Ballet; and a sample from "How High" written by Erick Sermon, Reggie Noble, and Clifford Smith and performed by Method Man & Redman.

== Charts ==
=== Weekly charts ===
Weekly chart performance for Backstreet's Back
Chart (1997–1998)	Peak position
Australian Albums (ARIA)	2
Austrian Albums (Ö3 Austria)	1
Belgian Albums (Ultratop Flanders)	1
Belgian Albums (Ultratop Wallonia)	1
Canadian Albums (Billboard)	1
Czech Albums (IFPI CR)	2
Danish Albums (Hitlisten)	1
Dutch Albums (Album Top 100)	1
Estonian Albums (Eesti Top 10)	3
European Albums Chart	1
Finnish Albums (Suomen virallinen lista)	1
French Albums (SNEP)	22
German Albums (Offizielle Top 100)	1
Greek Albums (IFPI Greece)	1
Hungarian Albums (MAHASZ)	1
Icelandic Albums (Tonlist)	12
Irish Albums (IRMA)	5
Italian Albums (FIMI)	4
Italian Albums (Musica e Dischi)	4
Japanese Albums (Oricon)	23
Malaysian Albums (IFPI)	1
New Zealand Albums (RMNZ)	2
Norwegian Albums (VG-lista)	1
Portuguese Albums (AFP)	4
Scottish Albums (Official Charts)	7
Spanish Albums (PROMUSICAE)	1
Swedish Albums (Sverigetopplistan)	1
Swiss Albums (Schweizer Hitparade)	1
Taiwanese Albums (IFPI)	1
UK Albums (Official Charts)	2
Zimbabwean Albums (ZIMA)	8

=== Year-end charts ===
1997 year-end chart performance for Backstreet's Back
Chart (1997)	Position
Austrian Albums (Ö3 Austria)	5
Belgian Albums (Ultratop Flanders)	8
Belgian Albums (Ultratop Wallonia)	16
Canadian Albums (Nielsen Soundscan)	5
Danish Albums (Hitlisten)	5
Dutch Albums (MegaCharts)	19
European Albums (Music & Media)	9
German Albums (Offizielle Top 100)	4
New Zealand Albums (RMNZ)	46
Spanish Albums (PROMUSICAE)	3
Swedish Albums (Sverigetopplistan)	10
Swiss Albums (Schweizer Hitparade)	13
UK Albums (OCC)	12

1998 year-end chart performance for Backstreet's Back
Chart (1998)	Position
Australian Albums (ARIA)	4
Canada Top Albums/CDs (RPM)	11
European Albums (Music & Media)	15
German Albums (Offizielle Top 100)	43
Italian Albums (Musica e dischi)	6
New Zealand Albums (RMNZ)	24
Spanish Albums (PROMUSICAE)	25
Swedish Albums (Sverigetopplistan)	69
Swiss Albums (Schweizer Hitparade)	50
UK Albums (OCC)	74

== Certifications and sales ==
Certifications and sales for Backstreet's Back
Region	Certification	Certified units/sales
Argentina (CAPIF)	5× Platinum	300,000^{^}
Australia (ARIA)	6× Platinum	420,000^{‡}
Austria (IFPI Austria)	Platinum	50,000^{*}
Belgium (BRMA)	2× Platinum	100,000^{*}
Brazil (Pro-Música Brasil)	2× Platinum	500,000^{*}
Canada (Music Canada)	Diamond	1,048,000
Colombia	—	800,000
Denmark (IFPI Danmark)	6× Platinum	120,000^{‡}
Finland (Musiikkituottajat)	Platinum	49,334
France (SNEP)	Gold	100,000^{*}
Germany (BVMI)	2× Platinum	1,000,000^{^}
Hong Kong (IFPI Hong Kong)	Platinum	20,000^{*}
Italy (FIMI)	4× Platinum	400,000^{*}
Japan (RIAJ)	Gold	100,000^{^}
Mexico (AMPROFON)	Platinum+Gold	350,000^{^}
Netherlands (NVPI)	2× Platinum	200,000^{^}
New Zealand (RMNZ)	Platinum	15,000^{^}
Norway	—	75,000
Poland (ZPAV)	Platinum	100,000^{*}
Spain (Promusicae)	8× Platinum	800,000^{^}
Sweden (GLF)	2× Platinum	160,000^{^}
Switzerland (IFPI Switzerland)	2× Platinum	100,000^{^}
United Kingdom (BPI)	2× Platinum	700,000
Summaries
Europe (IFPI)	5× Platinum	5,000,000^{*}
Worldwide	—	10,000,000
^{*} Sales figures based on certification alone.^{^} Shipments figures based on certification alone.^{‡} Sales+streaming figures based on certification alone.
