= We've Got It Goin' On =

1995 single by Backstreet Boys

Single by Backstreet Boys

from the album Backstreet Boys (international and US)
- B-side: "Album Medley"; "Tell Me That I'm Dreaming"
- Released: September 11, 1995
- Recorded: June 1995
- Studio: Cheiron (Stockholm, Sweden)
- Genre: Pop; R&B
- Length: 3:39
- Label: Jive
- Songwriters: Denniz Pop; Max Martin; Herbert Crichlow
- Producers: Denniz Pop; Max Martin

Backstreet Boys singles chronology
"We've Got It Goin' On" (1995)	"I'll Never Break Your Heart" (1995)

Backstreet Boys US singles chronology
"We've Got It Goin' On" (1995)	"Quit Playing Games (with My Heart)" (1997)

Music video
- "We've Got It Goin' On" on YouTube

"We've Got It Goin' On" is a song by American boy band Backstreet Boys, released as their debut single. It was issued on September 11, 1995, by Jive Records as the lead single from their self-titled debut album (1996). The song was recorded at Cheiron Studios in Sweden during a week in December 1994 and January 1995. It was written and produced by Max Martin and his then-mentor Denniz Pop, with extra writing from Herbert Crichlow and was later included in the US album and achieved success worldwide. The single peaked at number 69 on the US Billboard Hot 100 and spent 20 weeks on the chart. It was released across Europe, where it reached the top five in several countries, including Austria, Belgium, France, Germany, the Netherlands, Switzerland and the United Kingdom. On the Eurochart Hot 100, the song reached number eleven. The accompanying music video was directed by Lionel C. Martin and filmed in Orlando, Florida.

== Background ==
The group was brought over to Stockholm for a week to record the song in December 1994 and January 1995. However, they finished unexpectedly in just two days. Producers Max Martin and Denniz Pop then suggested recording "Quit Playing Games (with My Heart)" immediately afterwards.

== Critical reception ==
Larry Flick from Billboard magazine wrote, "Photogenic young male quintet looks ready to jump into the void long left open by the now-absent New Kids On The Block. They harmonize, grunt, and chant with faux-street authority over a Euro-savvy pop/jeep groove. Odds are good that they will go home winners." Dave Sholin from the Gavin Report noted that ranging in age from 15 to 22, "this Orlando-based quintet counts acts like Boyz II Men, Shai and Jodeci among their influences. The approach though is very much their own and the music fills a void on Top 40 right now. They shouldn't have to wait long to go on playlists." Caroline Sullivan from The Guardian commented in her review of the album, "However, they muster an unexpected guttural naughtiness on 'We've Got It Goin' On' that keeps things from hitting Boyzone-like depths of sickliness."

Pan-European magazine Music & Media said, "The two cousins from Kentucky and their three Florida friends are no strangers to Boyz II Men's brand of soulful spine-chilling harmonizing, and they do it with style." They also described the song as both "up-tempo" and "infectious". Music Week gave it four out of five, adding, "They're America's New Kids but Backstreet Boys' first single sounds more like MN8. It's powerful, dirty, soulful and commercial enough to catch on in the UK." Gavin Reeve from Smash Hits gave it a top score of five out of five and named it Best New Single, writing, "This, their debut single is a funky cros between MN8 'I've Got a Little Something for You' and the "Mr So-oft" chewy mint ads and it's catchier than the fearsome cold that's going round our office. So clear some space on your walls, practise saying "Take Who?" and get ready to fall in love. There is no escape!"

== Chart performance ==
"We've Got It Goin' On" entered the top 10 in Austria, Belgium (Flanders and Wallonia), France, Germany, the Netherlands, Switzerland, and the United Kingdom. In the UK, the single peaked at number three during its second run on the UK Singles Chart, on August 18, 1996. Additionally, "We've Got It Goin' On" was a top-20 hit in Denmark, Finland, Iceland, Ireland, and Sweden. Outside Europe, it reached number 11 on the Canadian Singles Chart, number 36 in New Zealand, numbers 63 and 69 on the US Cash Box Top 100 and Billboard Hot 100, and number 74 in Australia. The single received a gold record in Austria (25,000), Belgium (25,000) and Germany (250,000).

== Music video ==
The band's first music video, which was for "We've Got It Goin' On", was filmed on August 19, 1995, in Orlando, Florida was directed by American director and VJ Lionel C. Martin, and is prefaced by a radio interview with the now-former on-air staffer "Hildi" on XL 106.7 (WXXL). The video itself shows the band singing at a gym, outdoors at a park area, and in a studio space, as well as dancing onstage at a club, and playing at an arcade pool hall. In an episode, Brian Littrell deserts his girlfriend washing a Jeep Grand Cherokee to play basketball, for which she takes revenge by soaking him. The scene featured Brian's actual then-girlfriend Samantha Stonebraker and her brother Steven, while AJ McLean's then girlfriend Marissa Jackson appears as the money collector during the Pool game in the video. There is also a brief cameo by Lou Pearlman.

== Track listings ==
=== 1995 release ===
- US CD and cassette single
1. "We've Got It Goin' On" (radio mix) – 3:39
2. "We've Got It Goin' On" (Amadin's Euro Mix) – 3:55
3. "Backstreet Boys Album Medley" – 4:08
- US 12-inch single

A1. "We've Got It Goin' On" (CL's Real Butch Dub) – 8:55
A2. "We've Got It Goin' On" (Marcus' Edge Factor Dub) – 8:35
B1. "We've Got It Goin' On" (CL's Anthem Vocal Odyssey) – 8:38
B2. "We've Got It Goin' On" (Marcus' Deadly Vocal Hotmix) – 6:36

- UK and Australian CD single
1. "We've Got It Goin' On" (radio edit) – 3:39
2. "We've Got It Goin' On" (Hula's house mix) – 5:11
3. "We've Got It Goin' On" (T and K Harlesden Mix) – 3:42
4. "We've Got It Goin' On" (Amadin club mix) – 6:33
5. "We've Got It Goin' On" (Hula's club mix) – 3:50
- UK 12-inch single
1. "We've Got It Goin' On" (radio edit) – 3:39
2. "We've Got It Goin' On" (Hula's extended house mix) – 5:12
3. "We've Got It Goin' On" (T and K Harlesden Mix) – 3:42
4. "We've Got It Goin' On" (Amadin club mix) – 6:33
- European CD single
1. "We've Got It Goin' On" (radio edit) – 3:39
2. "We've Got It Goin' On" (Hula's house mix) – 5:11
- European 7-inch single

A. "We've Got It Goin' On" (radio edit) – 3:39
B. "Tell Me That I'm Dreaming" – 4:46

=== 1996 release ===
- UK CD1 and Australasian CD single
1. "We've Got It Goin' On" (radio edit) – 3:39
2. "We've Got It Goin' On" (Hula's house mix) – 5:11
3. "Get Down" (Smokin Beats club mix) – 7:14
4. "Tell Me That I'm Dreaming" – 4:40
- UK CD2
1. "We've Got It Goin' On" (radio edit) – 3:39
2. "We've Got It Goin' On" (Hula's club mix) – 3:50
3. "We've Got It Goin' On" (Serious Rope main mix) – 7:16
4. "We've Got It Goin' On" (Markus' Deadly Vocal Hot Mix) – 6:26
5. "We've Got It Goin' On" (CL's Anthem Vocal Odyssey) – 8:38
6. "We've Got It Goin' On" (Markus' Edge Factor Dub) – 8:35
- Japanese CD single
1. "We've Got It Goin' On" (radio edit)
2. "We've Got It Goin' On" (Hula's house mix)
3. "Get Down" (Smokin' Beats club mix)
4. "Tell Me That I'm Dreaming"
5. "I'll Never Break Your Heart" (radio edit)
6. "Roll with It"

== Credits and personnel ==
- Written by Denniz Pop, Herbert Crichlow and Max Martin
- Produced by Denniz Pop and Max Martin
- Recorded and mixed at Cheiron Studios, Stockholm, Sweden

== Charts ==
=== Weekly charts ===
Chart (1995–1997)	Peak position
Australia (ARIA)	74
Austria (Ö3 Austria Top 40)	3
Belgium (Ultratop 50 Flanders)	6
Belgium (Ultratop 50 Wallonia)	5
Canada (Nielsen SoundScan)	15
Croatia (HRT)	35
Denmark (IFPI)	15
Estonia (Eesti Top 20)	8
Europe (Eurochart Hot 100)	11
Europe (European Dance Radio)	4
Europe (European Hit Radio)	33
Europe (Atlantic Crossovers)	12
Finland (Suomen virallinen lista)	13
France (SNEP)	5
France Airplay (SNEP)	5
Germany (GfK)	4
Iceland (Íslenski Listinn Topp 40)	16
Ireland (IRMA)	17
Israel (Israeli Singles Chart)	20
Netherlands (Dutch Top 40)	5
Netherlands (Single Top 100)	5
New Zealand (Recorded Music NZ)	36
Scottish Singles Sales (Official Charts)	51
Scottish Singles Sales (Official Charts) 1996 re-release	3
Spain Airplay (Top 40 Radio)	19
Sweden (Sverigetopplistan)	14
Switzerland (Schweizer Hitparade)	3
UK Singles (Official Charts)	54
UK Singles (Official Charts) 1996 re-release	3
UK Airplay (Music Week)	12
UK Indie (Music Week)	1
US Billboard Hot 100	69
US Dance Club Songs (Billboard)	31
US Pop Airplay (Billboard)	35
US Cash Box Top 100	63
US CHR/Pop Top 50 (Radio & Records)	35

=== Year-end charts ===
Chart (1996)	Position
Austria (Ö3 Austria Top 40)	17
Belgium (Ultratop 50 Flanders)	23
Belgium (Ultratop 50 Wallonia)	26
Europe (Eurochart Hot 100)	15
France (SNEP)	41
Germany (Media Control)	20
Israel (IBA)	29
Netherlands (Dutch Top 40)	25
Netherlands (Single Top 100)	42
Sweden (Topplistan)	99
Switzerland (Schweizer Hitparade)	5
UK Singles (OCC)	85

== Certifications ==
Region	Certification	Certified units/sales
Austria (IFPI Austria)	Gold	25,000^{*}
Belgium (BRMA)	Gold	25,000^{*}
Germany (BVMI)	Gold	250,000^{^}
United Kingdom (BPI)	Silver	200,000^{‡}
^{*} Sales figures based on certification alone.^{^} Shipments figures based on certification alone.^{‡} Sales+streaming figures based on certification alone.

== Release history ==
Region	Date	Format(s)	Label(s)	Ref.
Europe	September 11, 1995	CD	Jive	
United States	September 19, 1995	Contemporary hit radio; rhythmic contemporary radio	Jive	
United Kingdom	October 9, 1995	12-inch vinyl; CD; cassette	Jive	
United Kingdom (re-release)	August 12, 1996	CD; cassette	Jive	
Japan	January 22, 1997	CD	Jive	
