= Get Down (You're the One for Me) =

1996 single by Backstreet Boys

Single by Backstreet Boys

from the album Backstreet Boys (international and US)
- Released: April 30, 1996
- Studio: Matiz (Hamburg, Germany)
- Genre: Teen pop; dance-pop; hip hop
- Length: 3:50
- Label: Jive
- Songwriters: Bülent Aris; Smooth T.
- Producers: Aris; Toni Cottura

Backstreet Boys singles chronology
"I'll Never Break Your Heart" (1995)	"Get Down (You're the One for Me)" (1996)	"Quit Playing Games (with My Heart)" (1996)

Music video
- "Get Down (You're the One for Me)" on YouTube

"Get Down (You're the One for Me)" is a song by American boy band Backstreet Boys. It was released on April 30, 1996, by Jive Records, as the third single from their international self-titled debut album (1996). It was written and produced by Bülent Aris and Toni Cottura, and later included on their US debut album. The song was a number-one hit in Lithuania and a top-10 hit in countries like Austria, Belgium, Czech Republic, Estonia, Germany, Hungary, Latvia, the Netherlands and Switzerland. The accompanying music video was directed by Alan Calzatti, featuring the band performing on a disco ball.

== Background ==
In some countries, "Get Down" was released as their debut single. The song features a rap in the second verse by both Smooth T. of the group Fun Factory and band member AJ McLean. When performed live, other than a few isolated cases in which Smooth T. was able to join the band, McLean raps alternate lyrics during Smooth T.'s verse. The alternate first rap verse was recorded for the song and was used in the Markus Plastik Vocal Remix of the song: "So get ready - ready for the flavor we are bringin' / It's time I set it off and get your body swingin' / When we're alone, girl, I wanna push up / Can I get it? (yeah!) Everybody throw your hands up."

== Critical reception ==
British magazine Music Week gave the song a score of four out of five, writing, "The US boy band have had two massive hits throughout Europe but are yet to break into the UK Top 40. This infectious, upbeat number should do it."

== Music video ==
=== Background ===
The music video for "Get Down (You're the One for Me)" was directed by Alan Calzatti, and was filmed in Orlando, Florida on April 10, 1996. It was released in May 1996. As of Dec 2025, the video has over 85 million views on YouTube.

=== Synopsis ===
The band performs on the top half of a disco ball lit in a cold, bright, white light. They are also inside a second disco ball, with several females dancing inside individual cabins. Each member is seen wearing big black trousers and shoes, silver necklaces, and various oversized jackets; Nick wearing yellow and red, Brian wearing orange, Howie wearing black, AJ wearing dark yellow, and Kevin wearing bright yellow. Smooth T. appears and hovers around the band during his rap verse.

== Track listing ==
European 12-inch single

No.	Title	Length
1.	"Get Down (You're the One for Me) (Smokin Beats Club Mix)"	7:14
2.	"Get Down (You're the One for Me) (Smokin Beats Dub)"	5:13
3.	"Get Down (You're the One for Me) (Blue Haired Beats)"	7:56
4.	"Get Down (You're the One for Me) (DEZIGN Dub)"	7:04

German cassette single

No.	Title	Length
1.	"Get Down (You're the One for Me) (LP Edit)"	3:50
2.	"Get Down (You're the One for Me) (DEZIGN Radio Edit II)"	3:53

German maxi single

No.	Title	Length
1.	"Get Down (You're the One for Me) (LP Edit)"	3:50
2.	"Get Down (You're the One for Me) (DEZIGN Radio Edit I)"	3:58
3.	"Get Down (You're the One for Me) (CL Vocal Journey Radio Edit)"	4:21
4.	"Get Down (You're the One for Me) (Markus Plastik Vocal Radio Edit)"	4:02
5.	"Get Down (You're the One for Me) (DEZIGN Dub Radio Edit)"	5:11

== Credits and personnel ==
Credits adapted from the single's liner notes.

- Produced by Bülent Aris and Toni Cottura
- Vocal Recording by Hakan Wollard at Matiz Studios, Hamburg, Germany
- Rap by Toni Cottura
- All Instruments programmed by Bülent Aris and Toni Cottura

== Awards ==
Year	Award	Category	Result	Ref.
1996	MTV Europe Video Music Awards	MTV Select: Get Down (You're the One For Me)	Won	

== Charts ==
=== Weekly charts ===
Chart (1996–1997)	Peak position
Australia (ARIA)	44
Austria (Ö3 Austria Top 40)	4
Belgium (Ultratop 50 Flanders)	5
Belgium (Ultratop 50 Wallonia)	5
Canada (Nielsen SoundScan)	2
Canada Top Singles (RPM)	39
Canada Adult Contemporary (RPM)	36
Canada Dance/Urban (RPM)	7
Croatia (HRT)	20
Czech Republic (IFPI CR)	10
Denmark (Tracklisten)	11
Estonia (Eesti Top 20)	2
Europe (Eurochart Hot 100)	8
Europe (European AC Radio)	15
Europe (European Dance Radio)	2
Europe (European Hit Radio)	12
Europe (Atlantic Crossovers)	5
Finland (Suomen virallinen lista)	18
France (SNEP)	15
France Airplay (SNEP)	8
Germany (GfK)	5
Hungary (Mahasz)	4
Iceland (Íslenski Listinn Topp 40)	18
Ireland (IRMA)	19
Israel (Israeli Singles Chart)	33
Latvia (Latvijas Top 30)	3
Lithuania (M-1)	1
Netherlands (Dutch Top 40)	3
Netherlands (Single Top 100)	3
New Zealand (Recorded Music NZ)	34
Scotland (OCC)	11
Spain Airplay (Top 40 Radio)	31
Sweden (Sverigetopplistan)	17
Switzerland (Schweizer Hitparade)	7
UK Singles (Official Charts)	14
UK Airplay (Music Week)	27

=== Year-end charts ===
Chart (1996)	Position
Austria (Ö3 Austria Top 40)	35
Belgium (Ultratop 50 Flanders)	45
Belgium (Ultratop 50 Wallonia)	47
Europe (Eurochart Hot 100)	52
France (SNEP)	73
Germany (Media Control)	22
Latvia (Latvijas Top 50)	55
Netherlands (Dutch Top 40)	58
Netherlands (Single Top 100)	50
Switzerland (Schweizer Hitparade)	23
