= The Essential Backstreet Boys =

Greatest hits album by Backstreet Boys
- Released: September 26, 2013
- Recorded: 1994–2009
- Genres: Pop; pop rock; R&B; dance-pop; teen pop
- Labels: RCA; Legacy

Backstreet Boys chronology
In a World Like This (2013)	The Essential Backstreet Boys (2013)	The Box Set Series Backstreet Boys (2015)

The Essential Backstreet Boys is the third compilation album by American pop group Backstreet Boys, released by RCA Records and Legacy Recordings as part of their Essential series. It was released on September 26, 2013 in the United Kingdom, and on October 22, 2013 in the United States. The album includes songs from the group's first seven studio albums, Backstreet Boys (1996), Backstreet's Back (1997), Backstreet Boys (U.S.) (1997), Millennium (1999), Black & Blue (2000), Never Gone (2005), Unbreakable (2007), and This Is Us (2009). It also includes the song "If You Stay" recorded for the 1997 film Booty Call, and "Drowning" from their first greatest hits compilation, The Hits – Chapter One (2001).

== Critical reception ==
AllMusic gave the album 4 out of 5 stars, writing that "Essential Backstreet Boys traces this evolution, filling in a few more details of those early hit-making years, which makes this worthwhile for the dedicated fan, but many listeners may find either The Hits, or the variety of budget-line collections released since, to be a better bet as they contain the hits and nothing but."

Professional ratings
Review scores
Source	Rating
AllMusic	4/5 stars

== Track listing ==
Disc 1
No.	Title	Original album	Length
1.	"Everybody (Backstreet's Back)" (extended version)	Backstreet's Back/Backstreet Boys	4:46
2.	"As Long as You Love Me"	Backstreet's Back	3:32
3.	"Quit Playing Games (With My Heart)"	Backstreet Boys	3:53
4.	"I'll Never Break Your Heart"	Backstreet Boys	4:47
5.	"We've Got It Goin' On" (radio edit)	Backstreet Boys	3:40
6.	"All I Have to Give"	Backstreet's Back	4:35
7.	"The Call"	Black & Blue	3:24
8.	"I Want It That Way"	Millennium	3:34
9.	"Show Me the Meaning of Being Lonely"	Millennium	3:55
10.	"Get Another Boyfriend"	Black & Blue	3:06
11.	"If You Stay"	Booty Call (soundtrack)	4:19
12.	"The One"	Millennium	3:46
13.	"Shape of My Heart"	Black & Blue	3:51
14.	"More than That"	Black & Blue	3:44
15.	"Larger than Life"	Millennium	3:52

Disc 2
No.	Title	Original album	Length
1.	"Anywhere for You"	Backstreet Boys	4:40
2.	"Get Down (You're the One for Me)" (LP edit)	Backstreet Boys	3:51
3.	"Drowning"	The Hits: Chapter One	4:28
4.	"Just Want You to Know"	Never Gone	3:52
5.	"Incomplete"	Never Gone	3:59
6.	"Weird World"	Never Gone	4:12
7.	"Lose It All"	Never Gone	4:05
8.	"Inconsolable"	Unbreakable	3:38
9.	"Helpless When She Smiles" (radio version)	Unbreakable	4:05
10.	"One in a Million"	Unbreakable	3:32
11.	"Crawling Back to You"	Never Gone	3:44
12.	"I Still..."	Never Gone	3:49
13.	"Straight Through My Heart"	This Is Us	3:28
14.	"Bigger"	This Is Us	3:17
15.	"Bye Bye Love"	This Is Us	4:20

== Charts ==
Chart (2013)	Peak position
Greek Albums (IFPI)	33
South Korea (Gaon Charts)	11
Taiwanese Albums (Five Music)	14

== Release history ==
Country	Date	Format	Label
United Kingdom	September 26, 2013	CD, digital download	RCA; Legacy Recordings
United States	October 22, 2013	CD, digital download	RCA; Legacy Recordings
Japan	October 22, 2013	CD, digital download	Sony Music Japan
Canada	October 22, 2013	CD, digital download	Sony Music Entertainment
Taiwan	October 25, 2013	CD, digital download	Sony Music Entertainment
Germany	January 3, 2014	CD, digital download	Sony Music Entertainment
