= This Is Us Tour =

2009–11 concert tour by the Backstreet Boys

- Tour by Backstreet Boys
- Promotional poster for the tour
- Associated album: This Is Us
- Start date: October 30, 2009
- End date: March 26, 2011
- Legs: 4
- No. of shows: 122

Backstreet Boys concert chronology
- Unbreakable Tour (2008–2009); This Is Us Tour (2009–2011); NKOTBSB Tour (2011–2012)

The This Is Us Tour was the eighth concert tour by American boy band, the Backstreet Boys. The tour promotes their seventh studio album, This Is Us (2009). The tour reached Europe, Asia, Australasia and the Americas. The tour was the second and final concert tour that the band had performed as a quartet before the original member Kevin Richardson returned on April 29, 2012.

== Background ==
With the announcement of their seventh studio album, the band reported they will spend the latter half of 2009 and all of 2010 on the road. The trek began in Europe in October 2009 and ended in South America in March 2011. Band member, Howie Dorough stated the tour was not a comeback tour, after the sluggish sales of their last album. He stated the band has matured during their nearly 20 years in the music industry. This maturity would be reflected in their album and upcoming tour. He was later interviewed by Jam!, where he stated the band were in tour rehearsals and this would be the first tour in which the group had background dancers since 2001. To promote the tour, the band did several promotional performances in the United States, Japan, Spain and Switzerland. Some performances were cancelled due to the member Brian Littrell contracting H1N1. To introduce the tour, Nick Carter stated:

"[It's] a pop show, dancing, singing, cool gags, just big energy, explosions. You get to see a group who hopefully you've liked through the years. We perform our biggest hits -- we've got 10 or 12 top 10 hits around the world that people know -- so we perform those as well as songs off our new record. It's just jam-packed. We've got four dancers and big production."

While on tour, it was announced the band will perform aboard Carnival Cruise Lines, Carnival Destiny with a show titled, "SS Backstreet"—done in similar vein to the New Kids on the Block and Boyz II Men. During the summer of 2010, the Backstreet Boys joined New Kids on the Block onstage at the Radio City Music Hall (as a part of NKOTB Casi-NO Tour), where the groups performed "I Want It That Way". Since the performance, the media began to circulate rumors of the two uniting for a tour in the summer of 2011. The tour is created by Live Nation Entertainment as an outlet to reignite the boy band fad in the United States.

The tour, named the NKOTBSB Tour, was officially announced on On Air with Ryan Seacrest. Due to demand, the Backstreet Boys continued their tour into 2011 with additional dates in South America and Asia.

== Opening acts ==
- Ricki-Lee Coulter (Australia)
- J Williams (New Zealand)
- Mindless Behavior (North America) (select dates)
- Tino Coury (Pittsburgh show only)
- Madcon (London, O2 Arena)
- Dan Talevski (North America) (select dates)
- Shawn Desman (North America) (select dates)

== Set list ==
There was a concert DVD of the tour held in Japan.

2009
1. "Countdown" (Video Introduction)
2. "Everybody (Backstreet's Back)"
3. "We've Got It Goin' On"
4. "PDA"
5. "Quit Playing Games (with My Heart)"
6. "As Long as You Love Me"
7. "Howie: The Fast and the Furious" (Video Interlude)*
8. "This Is Us"
9. "Show Me the Meaning of Being Lonely"
10. "All I Have to Give"
11. "She's a Dream"
12. "I'll Never Break Your Heart"
13. "A.J.: Fight Club" (Video Interlude)*
14. Medley: "The Call" / "The One" / "Shape of My Heart" / "I Want It That Way"
15. "Bigger" (contains elements of "True")
16. "Brian: Enchanted" (Video Interlude)*
17. "More than That"
18. "Undone"
19. "Drowning" (Cut after 3 shows)
20. "Incomplete" (Replaced "Inconsolable" after 2 Shows)
21. "Nick: The Matrix" (Video Interlude)*
22. "Larger than Life" (contains elements of "Seven Nation Army")
23. "All of Your Life (You Need Love)"
24. "Bye Bye Love"

Encore

25. "Straight Through My Heart"
2010, 2011
1. "Countdown" (Video Introduction)
2. "Everybody (Backstreet's Back)"
3. "We've Got It Goin' On"
4. "PDA"
5. "Quit Playing Games (with My Heart)/ As Long as You Love Me"
6. "Howie: The Fast and the Furious" (Video Interlude)*
7. "This Is Us"
8. "Show Me the Meaning of Being Lonely"
9. "All I Have to Give"
10. "She's a Dream"
11. "I'll Never Break Your Heart"
12. "A.J.: Fight Club" (Video Interlude)*
13. Medley: "The Call" / "The One"
14. "Bigger" (contains elements of "True")
15. "If I Knew Then" (played before "Shape of My Heart" in Toronto) (performed before "I Want It That Way" in Pittsburgh)
16. "Shape of My Heart"
17. "Brian: Enchanted" (Video Interlude)*
18. "More than That"
19. "Undone"
20. "Drowning" (Toronto only)
21. "Incomplete"
22. "Nick: The Matrix" (Video Interlude)*
23. "Larger than Life" (contains elements of "Seven Nation Army")
24. "All of Your Life (You Need Love)"
25. "Bye Bye Love"
26. "I Want It That Way"

Encore

27. "Straight Through My Heart"
Cruise 2011 - For the Fans Show
1. "Incomplete" (contains elements of "POWER")
2. "Larger than Life" (contains elements of "Party Rock Anthem")
3. "If You Want It to Be Good Girl (Get Yourself a Bad Boy)"
4. "Get Down (You're the One for Me)"
5. "Inconsolable"
6. "London" (A.J. Mclean solo)
7. "Helpless When She Smiles"
8. "Siberia"
9. "Mary, Did You Know?" (Brian Littrell solo)
10. "Bigger"
11. "Quit Playing Games (with My Heart)"
12. "As Long as You Love Me"
13. "I Want It That Way"
14. "Lie To Me" (Howie Dorough solo)
15. "Don't Want You Back"
16. "If I Knew Then"
17. "Burning Up" (Nick Carter solo)
18. "Shape of My Heart"
19. "Everybody (Backstreet's Back)"

Encore

20. "Drowning"
- indidicates what wasn't included in the DVD

== Tour dates ==
Date	City	Country	Venue
Europe
October 30, 2009	Lisbon	Portugal	Pavilhão Atlântico
October 31, 2009	Madrid	Spain	Palacio Vistalegre
November 3, 2009	Newcastle	England	Metro Radio Arena
November 4, 2009	Manchester	England	Manchester Evening News Arena
November 7, 2009	Glasgow	Scotland	Scottish Exhibition and Conference Centre
November 8, 2009	Birmingham	England	LG Arena
November 9, 2009	Liverpool	England	Echo Arena Liverpool
November 10, 2009	London	England	The O2 Arena
November 12, 2009	Belfast	Northern Ireland	Odyssey Arena
November 13, 2009	Dublin	Ireland	The O_{2}
November 15, 2009	Rotterdam	Netherlands	Rotterdam Ahoy
November 16, 2009	Oberhausen	Germany	König Pilsener Arena
November 17, 2009	Zürich	Switzerland	Hallenstadion
November 18, 2009	Munich	Germany	Zenith Munich
November 20, 2009	Antwerp	Belgium	Lotto Arena
November 22, 2009	Frankfurt	Germany	Jahrhunderthalle
November 23, 2009	Berlin	Germany	O_{2} World
November 24, 2009	Milan	Italy	PalaSharp
November 25, 2009	Bratislava	Slovakia	Sibamac Arena
November 27, 2009	Zagreb	Croatia	Arena Zagreb
November 29, 2009	Bamberg	Germany	Jako Arena
November 30, 2009	Prague	Czech Republic	O_{2} Arena
December 2, 2009	Helsinki	Finland	Hartwall Arena
December 4, 2009	Stockholm	Sweden	Hovet
December 5, 2009	Oslo	Norway	Oslo Spektrum
December 6, 2009^{[A]}	London	England	The O_{2} Arena
December 8, 2009	Copenhagen	Denmark	Valby-Hallen
December 10, 2009	Saint Petersburg	Russia	Ice Palace
December 11, 2009	Moscow	Russia	Crocus City Hall
December 13, 2009	Kyiv	Ukraine	Kyiv Palace of Sports
December 15, 2009	Belgrade	Serbia	Belgrade Arena
Asia
December 17, 2009	Dubai	United Arab Emirates	Palladium Auditorium
February 5, 2010	Saitama City	Japan	Saitama Super Arena
February 6, 2010	Saitama City	Japan	Saitama Super Arena
February 7, 2010	Saitama City	Japan	Saitama Super Arena
February 9, 2010	Kobe	Japan	World Memorial Hall
February 10, 2010	Kobe	Japan	World Memorial Hall
February 11, 2010	Kobe	Japan	World Memorial Hall
February 14, 2010	Nagoya	Japan	Nippon Gaishi Hall
February 15, 2010	Nagoya	Japan	Nippon Gaishi Hall
February 17, 2010	Tokyo	Japan	Tokyo International Forum
February 18, 2010	Tokyo	Japan	Nippon Budokan
February 20, 2010^{[B]}	New Delhi	India	NSIC Exhibition Grounds
February 21, 2010^{[B]}	Bangalore	India	Bangalore Palace Grounds
February 24, 2010	Seoul	South Korea	Melon-AX Hall
February 25, 2010	Taipei	Taiwan	Taipei Arena
February 27, 2010	Quezon City	Philippines	Araneta Coliseum
February 28, 2010	Marina Centre	Singapore	SSICEC Convention Hall
Oceania
March 2, 2010	Perth	Australia	Challenge Stadium
March 5, 2010	Melbourne	Australia	Rod Laver Arena
March 6, 2010	Sydney	Australia	Sydney Entertainment Centre
March 8, 2010	Brisbane	Australia	Brisbane Entertainment Centre
March 11, 2010	Auckland	New Zealand	Vector Arena
Asia (Leg 2)
March 14, 2010	Shanghai	China	Shanghai International Gymnastic Center
March 15, 2010	Shanghai	China	Shanghai International Gymnastic Center
March 17, 2010	Beijing	China	Wukesong Indoor Stadium
North America
April 11, 2010	Napa	United States	Napa Valley Opera House
May 23, 2010	New York City	United States	Highline Ballroom
May 29, 2010	Miami	United States	Waterfront Theater
May 31, 2010	Clearwater	United States	Ruth Eckerd Hall
June 1, 2010	Orlando	United States	Hard Rock Live
June 3, 2010	Atlanta	United States	Chastain Park Amphitheater
June 4, 2010	Biloxi	United States	Studio A
June 5, 2010	Valdosta	United States	All-Starr Amphitheater
June 6, 2010	Raleigh	United States	Raleigh Amphitheatre
June 8, 2010	Boston	United States	Bank of America Pavilion
June 9, 2010	Vienna	United States	Wolf Trap Filene Center
June 10, 2010	New York City	United States	Hammerstein Ballroom
June 12, 2010	Atlantic City	United States	Etess Arena
June 13, 2010	West Long Branch	United States	Multipurpose Activity Center
June 15, 2010	Uncasville	United States	Mohegan Sun Arena
June 17, 2010^{[C]}	Highland Park	United States	Ravinia Park Pavilion
June 18, 2010	Clarkston	United States	DTE Energy Music Theatre
June 21, 2010	Kansas City	United States	Midland Theatre
June 22, 2010	Broomfield	United States	1stBank Center
June 23, 2010	Salt Lake City	United States	EnergySolutions Arena
June 25, 2010	Temecula	United States	Pechanga Showroom Theater
June 26, 2010	Los Angeles	United States	Gibson Amphitheatre
June 27, 2010	San Francisco	United States	Warfield Theatre
June 28, 2010	San Francisco	United States	Warfield Theatre
June 30, 2010	Reno	United States	Grand Theatre
July 1, 2010	Fresno	United States	Save Mart Center
July 2, 2010	Paradise	United States	The Beach at Mandalay Bay
July 24, 2010^{[D]}	Boise	United States	Ann Morrison Park
August 4, 2010	Wenatchee	United States	Town Toyota Center
August 5, 2010	Kent	United States	ShoWare Center
August 6, 2010	Vancouver	Canada	Rogers Arena
August 8, 2010	Calgary	Canada	Pengrowth Saddledome
August 9, 2010	Edmonton	Canada	Rexall Place
August 11, 2010	Winnipeg	Canada	MTS Centre
August 14, 2010	Toronto	Canada	Molson Amphitheatre
August 15, 2010	Ottawa	Canada	Scotiabank Place
August 16, 2010	Montreal	Canada	Bell Centre
August 18, 2010	Halifax	Canada	Halifax Metro Centre
August 19, 2010	Saint John	Canada	Harbour Station
August 21, 2010	St. John's	Canada	Mile One Stadium
August 22, 2010^{[E]}	Baltimore	United States	Pier Six Concert Pavilion
August 23, 2010	Lincoln	United States	Twin River Event Center
August 25, 2010	Pittsburgh	United States	Trib Total Media Amphitheatre
August 26, 2010	New York City	United States	Hammerstein Ballroom
August 27, 2010	Cleveland	United States	Nautica Pavilion
August 28, 2010	Cincinnati	United States	Riverbend Music Center
December 8, 2010	Miami	United States	Byron Carlyle Theater
December 9, 2010^{[F]}	Miami	United States	Destiny Palladium
December 10, 2010^{[F]}	Miami	United States	Destiny Palladium
December 11, 2010^{[F]}	Miami	United States	Destiny Palladium
December 12, 2010^{[F]}	Miami	United States	Destiny Palladium
December 13, 2010^{[F]}	Miami	United States	Destiny Palladium
South America
February 18, 2011	Recife	Brazil	Chevrolet Hall
February 20, 2011	Brasília	Brazil	Nilson Nelson Gymnasium
February 23, 2011	Belo Horizonte	Brazil	Chevrolet Hall
February 25, 2011	Rio de Janeiro	Brazil	Citibank Hall
February 26, 2011	São Paulo	Brazil	Credicard Hall
March 1, 2011	Buenos Aires	Argentina	Luna Park
March 3, 2011	Santiago	Chile	Movistar Arena
March 5, 2011	Lima	Peru	Jockey Club del Perú
March 8, 2011	Quito	Ecuador	Coliseo General Rumiñahui
March 10, 2011	Caracas	Venezuela	Terraza del CCCT
North America (Leg 2)
March 12, 2011	Panama City	Panama	Teatro Anayansi
March 14, 2011	Zapopan	Mexico	Auditorio Telmex
March 16, 2011	Mexico City	Mexico	Auditorio Nacional
March 18, 2011	Monterrey	Mexico	Arena Monterrey
Asia (Leg 3)
March 24, 2011	Ho Chi Minh City	Vietnam	Quân khu 7 Stadium
March 26, 2011	Hanoi	Vietnam	Mỹ Đình National Stadium

Festivals and other miscellaneous performances
^{A} This concert was a part of the "Jingle Bell Ball"
^{B} These concerts were a part of "Rock 'n India"
^{C} This concert was a part of the "Ravinia Festival"
^{D} This concert was a part of the "Boise Music Festival"
^{E} This concert was a part of "Mixfest"
^{F} These concerts were a part of the "SS Backstreet"

Cancellations and rescheduled shows

December 8, 2010	Kyiv, Ukraine	Kyiv International Exhibition Centre	This concert was moved to the Kyiv Palace of Sports for December 13, 2009
December 13, 2009	Minsk, Belarus	Minsk Sports Palace	Cancelled

=== Box office score data ===
Venue	City	Tickets sold / available	Gross revenue
Rotterdam Ahoy	Rotterdam	8,337 / 9,547 (87%)	$482,526
Lotto Arena	Antwerp	4,427 / 4,932 (90%)	$286,971
Rod Laver Arena	Melbourne	6,950 / 7,775 (89%)	$504,644
Sydney Entertainment Centre	Sydney	5,731 / 6,000 (95%)	$422,461
Brisbane Entertainment Centre	Brisbane	2,629 / 2,850 (92%)	$202,174
Waterfront Theater	Miami	4,491 / 4,539 (93%)	$178,703
Ruth Eckerd Hall	Clearwater	1,683 / 1,983 (89%)	$94,181
Multipurpose Activity Center	West Long Branch	3,278 / 4,013 (82%)	$140,105
Mohegan Sun Arena	Uncasville	3,909 / 4,332 (80%)	$136,360
DTE Energy Music Center	Clarkston	15,196 / 15,196 (100%)	$213,930
Warfield Theatre	San Francisco	3,701 / 4,500 (82%)	$192,305
Save Mart Center	Fresno	3,519 / 6,345 (55%)	$121,482
Rexall Place	Edmonton	5,037 / 10,000 (50%)	$284,200
Bell Centre	Montreal	9,963 / 12,200 (82%)	$608,379
Halifax Metro Centre	Halifax	3,016 / 3,770 (80%)	$168,105
Harbour Station	Saint John	2,547 / 3,184 (80%)	$146,500
Mile One Stadium	St. John's	3,418 / 4,727 (72%)	$194,186
Nilson Nelson Gymnasium	Brasília	3,498 / 13,300 (26%)	$255,867
Chevrolet Hall	Belo Horizonte	2,972 / 6,000 (49%)	$204,077
Citibank Hall	Rio de Janeiro	5,782 / 8,433 (68%)	$420,523
Credicard Hall	São Paulo	6,462 / 6,949 (93%)	$644,205
Luna Park	Buenos Aires	6,339 / 8,293 (76%)	$461,184
Movistar Arena	Santiago	9,689 / 12,676 (76%)	$614,488
Jockey Club del Perú	Lima	8,077 / 9,000 (90%)	$399,201
Coliseo General Rumiñahui	Quito	9,931 / 11,070 (90%)	$529,751
Terraza del CCCT	Caracas	3,962 / 5,600 (65%)	$453,926
Teatro Anayansi	Panama City	2,508 / 2,806 (71%)	$144,581
Total		179,522 / 199,703 (89%)	$10,932,123

== Broadcasts and recordings ==
For the live DVD, the concert at the Nippon Budokan in Tokyo, Japan was filmed on February 18, 2010, and sold through Japanese websites. It was released under the title "Backstreet Boys: This Is Us Japan Tour 2010."

== Critical reception ==
Overall, the tour received positive feedback from music critics in each region the band toured. The quartet received a four of five star review from Kate Watkins (City Life). She writes, "Show Me The Meaning Of Being Lonely demonstrated the tight vocals they have developed over the last decade. And just to inform pop music sceptics they sang live and didn't mime even though the show was laced with energetic choreography."

Ed Power (The Independent) provided the group with a positive review stating, "Backstreet also deserve credit for not over-indulging in the customary patronising patter you get from most pop acts. Instead of repetitive shout outs of, "how you doing Dublin", the Boys simply churn out hit after hit without pausing for breath. Sure, they haven't re-invented the wheel musically, yet they prove in style that they've already left a considerable legacy of entertainment." Vicki Kellaway (Liverpool Echo) gave the band a 10 out 10 remarking, "They are utterly shameless. You might think four men with an average age of 32 (I’m sorry to remind you of that) would feel they are beyond the baggy jeans, printed hoodies, huge trainers and exaggerated ‘running man’ dance moves. Oh no. You might as well give a crowd what they want. This was not one of those we'll-hit-you-with-our-new-material and throw in a medley for fun. It was pure nostalgia."

For their concert at the Challenge Stadium in Perth, Sandra Bahbah (The Sunday Times) stated. "There is not one person who will dispute that The Backstreet Boys are as corny as a heart-shaped box of chocolates on Valentine's Day, but like that item, they are a sweet treat. Their boy band dance moves were impressive but definitely giggle-worthy as one could only describe them as over the top. They had four female back-up dancers to help with the evening's entertainment and more costume changes than a Beyonce concert, but by gosh it was fun to watch." Rebecca Barry (The New Zealand Herald) did not think highly of the band's performance at Auckland's Vector Arena. She wrote, "The band still rely on their old stable of choreographed white-man manoeuvres: it's raining on my face, the lawn mower, side-scissor robot shuffle – and Carter's fans' favourite, slowly-remove-jacket-to-show-off-newly-sculpted-arms. Seriously, you could hardly recognise the guy. Smarmy though he was, his voice soared on ballads such as Incomplete."

When the band returned stateside, the accolades continued. Alison Chriss (Creative Loafing) wrote, "The crowd left elated and ready to gab about the show. I heard a few guys commenting on how BSB updated their choreography, and even my husband admitted that, overall, the show was pretty good. For a trip down Pop music's memory lane, it was a great one, and my 14-year-old self is finally at peace after having the ultimate boy-band experience to end Memorial Day Weekend!" Keegan Prosser (The News Tribune) wrote, "The night proved to be a perfect flashback for the fans that have been there since the beginning, even if the nostalgia of it all left me longing for the sugary-pop of yesteryear. And despite the fact that the Boys in the Backyard are, today, a little more like Men in the Backyard (creepy), it seems to me they’ve still got a few tricks up those bedazzled sleeves."

== Personnel ==
- Lead Vocals: Brian Littrell, Howie Dorough, Nick Carter, AJ McLean
- Tour Director: Frank Gatson Jr.
- Tour Manager:
- Assistant Tour Manager:
- Co-Director:
- Co-Director:
- Tour Accountant:
- Musical Director: Kim Burse
- Costume Design:
- Choreographer: Rich and Tone Talauega

=== Security ===
- Michael "Mike" Elgani: Nick's Security*
- Drew Philip: Head of Security/Road Manager/Brian's Security
- Josh Naranjo: Howie's Security
- Marcus Johnson: AJ's Security
- John "Q" Elgani: Security*

=== Band ===
- Keyboards:
- Guitars:
- Percussion:
- Bass:
- Drums:

=== Dancers ===
- Jamie Overla
- Mayuko Kitayama
- Tye Myers
- Giggi Thesman
- Ashley Ashida Dixon (2009 European Leg)

Notes

- Nick's bodyguard, Mike, is Q's little brother
