= Unbreakable Tour (Backstreet Boys tour) =

2008–09 concert tour by the Backstreet Boys

- Tour by Backstreet Boys
- Promotional poster for tour
- Associated album: Unbreakable
- Start date: February 16, 2008
- End date: March 13, 2009
- Legs: 6
- No. of shows: 99

Backstreet Boys concert chronology
- Never Gone Tour (2005–2006); Unbreakable Tour (2008–2009); This Is Us Tour (2009–2011)

The Backstreet Boys' Unbreakable Tour was a 2008–2009 concert tour. This was their seventh concert tour in support of their sixth studio album Unbreakable (2007) and this was the first Backstreet Boys tour as a quartet without Kevin Richardson who left the group on June 23, 2006. He did, however, join his band again at the end of the tour in Los Angeles. Richardson later permanently returned to the group on April 29, 2012. The tour kicked off in Japan with two sold out concerts in the Tokyo Dome.

The show at London's O2 Arena on the May 14, 2008 was recorded. It was first shown in MSN "Music in Concert" at 2:00 PM ET/11:00AM PT on June 26, 2008. It was also later shown on VH1 in the UK on October 31, 2008 at 9pm. However, all solo songs were cut from the aired program, showing only the songs performed by them as a group.

== Background ==
The group planned to make it a true world tour, hitting countries that they had not visited in years, along with visiting new countries, including their first stop ever on tour in Russia, Latvia, Lithuania, Estonia, Peru, along with South Africa dates. The Luxembourg date was suspended after a fire broke out at the venue the afternoon of the performance, no one was seriously injured, but there was damage to the group's wardrobe.

== Opening acts ==
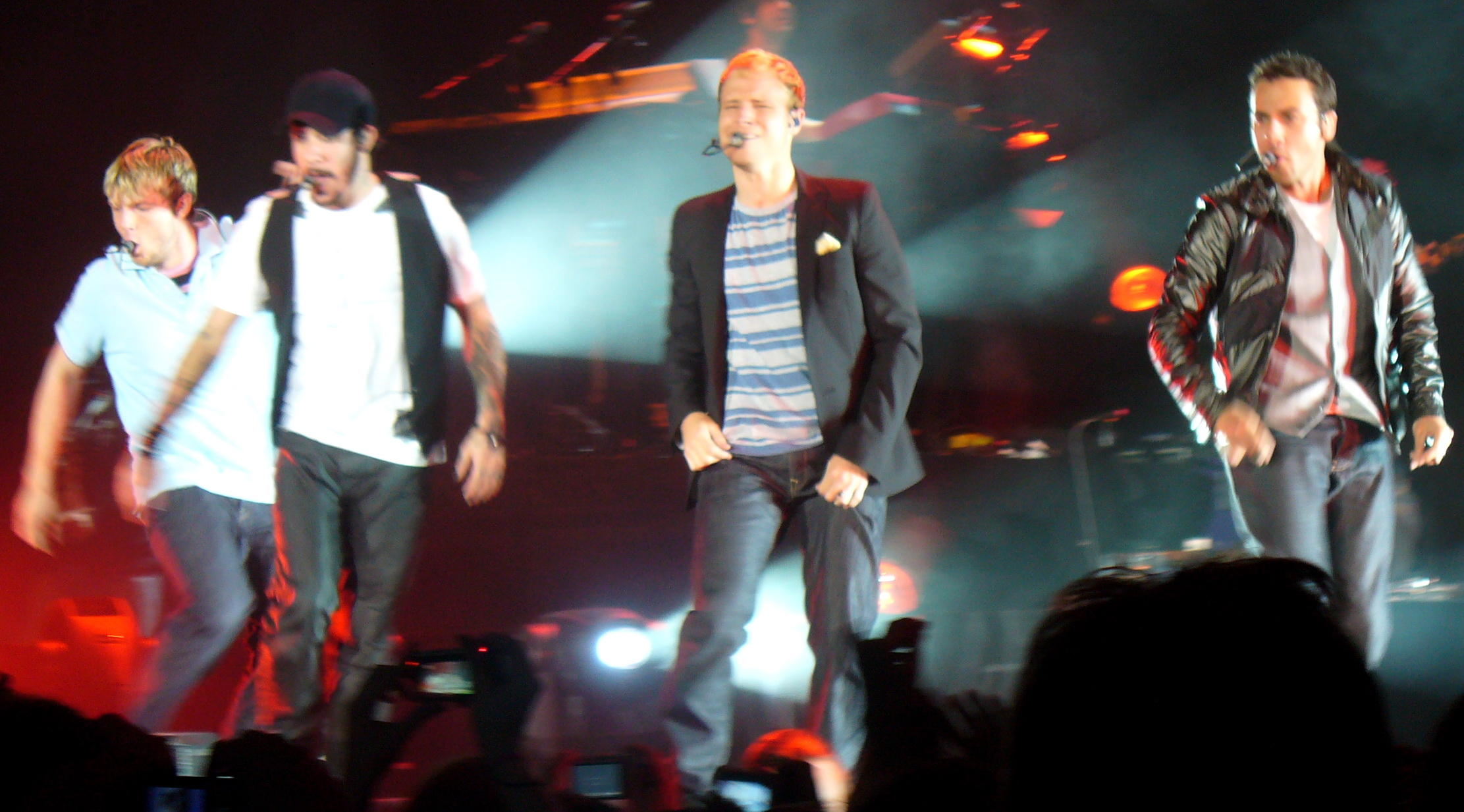
Backstreet Boys performing in Stockholm, Sweden on April 14, 2008.

- Brian McFadden (February 20 - February 23, 2008)
- Stanfour (April 2 - April 8, 2008; May 4, 2008)
- E.M.D. (April 14, 2008)
- George Nozuka (May 7 - May 14, 2008)
- The Drive Home (May 17 - May 22, 2008)
- Girlicious (July 30, 2008 - September 6, 2008)
- Divine Brown (November 4–17, 2008)
- Kreesha Turner (November 4 - November 17, 2008)
- Donnie Klang (October 30 - November 2, 2008; November 22 - November 23, 2008)
- Belanova (February 25, 2009)
- Ádammo (February 25, 2009)

== Setlist ==
1. "Larger than Life" (contains elements of "Eye of the Tiger" and "Stronger")
2. "Everyone"
3. "Any Other Way"
4. "You Can Let Go"
5. "Unmistakable"
6. "I Want It That Way"
7. "She's Like the Sun" (Howie Dorough solo)
8. "Show Me the Meaning of Being Lonely"
9. "More than That"
10. "Helpless When She Smiles" (Only performed in Asia & Europe)
11. "Spanish Eyes" (Only performed in South America & Mexico)
12. "Trouble Is"
13. "Incomplete"
14. "Drive By Love" (AJ McLean solo)
15. "Panic"
16. "I Got You" (Nick Carter solo)
17. "Quit Playing Games (with My Heart)" (contains elements of "Raspberry Beret")
18. "As Long As You Love Me" (contains elements of "I'll Be Around")
19. "All I Have to Give"
20. "I'll Never Break Your Heart"
21. "Inconsolable"
22. "Welcome Home (You)" (Brian Littrell solo)
23. Band Introduction (contains elements of "Feel Good Inc." and "Beat It")
24. "The One"
25. "Treat Me Right"
26. "The Call"
27. "Everybody (Backstreet's Back)"

Encore

28. "Shape of My Heart"

== Tour dates ==
Date	City	Country	Venue
Asia
February 16, 2008	Tokyo	Japan	Tokyo Dome
February 17, 2008	Tokyo	Japan	Tokyo Dome
Australia
February 20, 2008	Brisbane	Australia	Brisbane Entertainment Centre
February 22, 2008	Sydney	Australia	Acer Arena
February 23, 2008	Melbourne	Australia	Rod Laver Arena
Asia (Leg 2)
February 25, 2008	Jakarta	Indonesia	JCC Plenary Hall
February 27, 2008	Petaling Jaya	Malaysia	Sunway Lagoon Surf Beach
February 29, 2008	Hong Kong		AsiaWorld–Arena
March 2, 2008	Taipei	Taiwan	Taipei Arena
March 4, 2008	Nanjing	China	Nanjing Olympic Sports Center Gymnasium
March 6, 2008	Hangzhou	China	Yellow Dragon Gymnasium
March 8, 2008	Seoul	South Korea	Olympic Fencing Gymnasium
North America
March 12, 2008	Monterrey	Mexico	Arena Monterrey
March 14, 2008	Puebla	Mexico	Auditorio Siglo XXI
March 15, 2008	Zapopan	Mexico	Auditorio Telmex
March 17, 2008	Mexico City	Mexico	Auditorio Nacional
Europe
April 2, 2008	Stuttgart	Germany	Porsche-Arena
April 3, 2008	Munich	Germany	Olympiahalle
April 4, 2008	Leipzig	Germany	Arena Leipzig
April 6, 2008	Rotterdam	Netherlands	Rotterdam Ahoy Sportpaleis
April 8, 2008	Berlin	Germany	Max-Schmeling-Halle
April 9, 2008	Hamburg	Germany	Color Line Arena
April 11, 2008	Ballerup	Denmark	Ballerup Super Arena
April 12, 2008	Oslo	Norway	Oslo Spektrum
April 14, 2008	Stockholm	Sweden	Hovet
April 16, 2008	Helsinki	Finland	Hartwall Arena
April 19, 2008	Zürich	Switzerland	Hallenstadion
April 20, 2008	Padua	Italy	Palasport San Lazzaro
April 21, 2008	Frankfurt	Germany	Festhalle Frankfurt
April 23, 2008	Madrid	Spain	Palacio de Deportes
April 25, 2008	Lisbon	Portugal	Pavilhão Atlântico
April 27, 2008	Badalona	Spain	Palau Municipal d'Esports de Badalona
April 29, 2008	Milan	Italy	DatchForum di Assago
April 30, 2008	Rome	Italy	PalaLottomatica
May 2, 2008	Oberhausen	Germany	König Pilsener Arena
May 4, 2008	Brussels	Belgium	Forest National
May 7, 2008	Liverpool	England	Echo Arena Liverpool
May 8, 2008	Birmingham	England	National Indoor Arena
May 11, 2008	Glasgow	Scotland	Scottish Exhibition and Conference Centre
May 12, 2008	Belfast	Northern Ireland	Odyssey Arena
May 14, 2008	London	England	The O_{2} Arena
May 17, 2008	Riga	Latvia	Arena Riga
May 19, 2008	Tallinn	Estonia	Saku Suurhall Arena
May 20, 2008	Vilnius	Lithuania	Siemens Arena
May 21, 2008	Moscow	Russia	Olimpiyskiy
May 22, 2008	Saint Petersburg	Russia	Ice Palace Saint Petersburg
North America (Leg 2)
July 29, 2008	St. John's	Canada	Mile One Stadium
July 30, 2008	St. John's	Canada	Mile One Stadium
August 1, 2008	Moncton	Canada	Moncton Coliseum
August 2, 2008	Halifax	Canada	Halifax Metro Centre
August 4, 2008	Ottawa	Canada	Scotiabank Place
August 5, 2008	Montreal	Canada	Bell Centre
August 7, 2008	Toronto	Canada	Molson Amphitheatre
August 8, 2008	Clarkston	United States	DTE Energy Music Theatre
August 9, 2008	Kettering	United States	Fraze Pavilion
August 10, 2008^{[A]}	Indianapolis	United States	Hoosier Lottery Grandstand
August 14, 2008	Uncasville	United States	Mohegan Sun Arena
August 15, 2008	Atlantic City	United States	Etess Arena
August 16, 2008	Gilford	United States	Meadowbrook U.S. Cellular Pavilion
August 18, 2008	Vienna	United States	Filene Center
August 20, 2008	Atlanta	United States	Chastain Park Amphitheater
August 22, 2008	Bloomington	United States	U.S. Cellular Coliseum
August 23, 2008^{[B]}	Falcon Heights	United States	State Fair Grandstand
August 24, 2008^{[C]}	Highland Park	United States	The Pavilion
August 26, 2008	Sudbury	Canada	Sudbury Community Arena
August 27, 2008	Sault Ste. Marie	Canada	Steelback Centre
August 30, 2008	Regina	Canada	Brandt Centre
August 31, 2008	Edmonton	Canada	Rexall Place
September 2, 2008	Calgary	Canada	Pengrowth Saddledome
September 4, 2008	Vancouver	Canada	General Motors Place
September 5, 2008	Victoria	Canada	Save-On-Foods Memorial Centre
September 6, 2008^{[D]}	Redmond	United States	Marymoor Park
North America (Leg 3)
October 30, 2008	Reading	United States	Sovereign Center
October 31, 2008	Montclair	United States	Wellmont Theatre
November 1, 2008	Wilkes-Barre	United States	Wachovia Arena
November 2, 2008	Wallingford	United States	Chevrolet Theatre
November 4, 2008	Quebec City	Canada	Pavillon de la Jeunesse
November 5, 2008	Saguenay	Canada	Centre Georges-Vézina
November 6, 2008	Sherbrooke	Canada	Palais des Sports
November 8, 2008	London	Canada	John Labatt Centre
November 9, 2008	Hamilton	Canada	Copps Coliseum
November 12, 2008	Winnipeg	Canada	MTS Centre
November 13, 2008	Saskatoon	Canada	Credit Union Centre
November 15, 2008	Grande Prairie	Canada	Canada Games Arena
November 16, 2008	Prince George	Canada	CN Centre
November 17, 2008	Kamloops	Canada	Interior Savings Centre
November 22, 2008	Las Vegas	United States	Pearl Concert Theater
November 23, 2008	Los Angeles	United States	Hollywood Palladium
South America
February 21, 2009	San Juan	Puerto Rico	José Miguel Agrelot Coliseum
February 25, 2009	Lima	Peru	Explanada del Estadio Monumental
February 27, 2009	Caracas	Venezuela	Terraza del Centro Comercial Ciudad Tamanaco
March 1, 2009	Santiago	Chile	Movistar Arena
March 3, 2009	Buenos Aires	Argentina	Luna Park
March 5, 2009	São Paulo	Brazil	Estacionamento do Credicard Hall
March 7, 2009	Rio de Janeiro	Brazil	Citibank Hall
North America (Leg 4)
March 9, 2009	Monterrey	Mexico	Arena Monterrey
March 10, 2009	Torreón	Mexico	Coliseo Centenario
March 12, 2009	Mexico City	Mexico	Auditorio Nacional
March 13, 2009	Puebla	Mexico	Auditorio Siglo XXI

Festivals and other miscellaneous performances
^{A} Indiana State Fair
^{B} Minnesota State Fair
^{C} Ravinia Festival
^{D} Concerts at Marymoor

Cancellations and rescheduled shows

February 25, 2008	Jakarta, Indonesia	The Ritz-Carlton Grand Ballroom	Moved to the JCC Plenary Hall
March 2, 2008	Taipei, Taiwan	TWTC Nangang Exhibition Hall	Moved to Taipei Arena
March 6, 2008	Guangzhou, China	Guangzhou Gymnasium	Cancelled
March 8, 2008	Seoul, South Korea	Jangchung Gymnasium	Moved to Olympic Fencing Gymnasium
May 3, 2008	Esch-sur-Alzette, Luxembourg	Rockhal	Cancelled
June 13, 2008	North West, South Africa	Sun City Superbowl	Cancelled
June 14, 2008	North West, South Africa	Sun City Superbowl	Cancelled
June 15, 2008	North West, South Africa	Sun City Superbowl	Cancelled
June 17, 2008	Cape Town, South Africa	Grand Arena at the GrandWest Casino	Cancelled
August 12, 2008	Elizabeth, Indiana	The Outdoor Arena at Caesars Indiana	Cancelled
November 18, 2008	Nampa, Idaho	Idaho Center Arena	Cancelled
November 21, 2008	Phoenix, Arizona	Dodge Theatre	Cancelled
March 5, 2009	São Paulo, Brazil	ExpoCenter Transamérica	Moved to Estacionamento do Credicard Hall

=== Box office score data ===
Venue	City	Tickets sold / available	Gross revenue
Acer Arena	Sydney	7,865 / 8,216 (90%)	$594,941
Mile One Stadium	St. John's	9,562 / 10,624 (90%)	$580,640
Moncton Coliseum	Moncton	4,122 / 4,580 (90%)	$245,102
Halifax Metro Centre	Halifax	4,703 / 5,225 (89%)	$295,426
Scotiabank Place	Ottawa	6,025 / 6,025 (100%)	$374,728
Molson Amphitheatre	Toronto	13,453 / 13,453 (100%)	$605,374
Chastain Park Amphitheater	Atlanta	3,622 / 6,700 (54%)	$185,888
Brandt Centre	Regina	4,340 / 4,840 (89%)	$226,677
Rexall Place	Edmonton	8,596 / 8,941 (96%)	$504,168
Pengrowth Saddledome	Calgary	7,924 / 9,874 (80%)	$459,297
Save-On-Foods Memorial Centre	Victoria	5,044 / 5,044 (100%)	$302,259
Marymoor Park Concert Venue	Redmond	2,415 / 4,504 (53%)	$108,713
Wachovia Arena	Wilkes-Barre	2,695 / 5,644 (48%)	$130,132
Hollywood Palladium	Los Angeles	4,002 / 4,002 (100%)	$159,537
José Miguel Agrelot Coliseum	San Juan	2,400 / 4,363 (55%)	$192,693
Luna Park	Buenos Aires	5,799 / 6,195 (94%)	$224,986
Estacionamento do Credicard Hall	São Paulo	8,198 / 14,000 (58%)	$480,796
Citibank Hall	Rio de Janeiro	6,680 / 8,432 (79%)	$374,367
Arena Monterrey	Monterrey	9,370 / 9,683 (97%)	$380,716
TOTAL		116,815 / 140,345 (82%)	$6,426,440
