= Never Gone Tour =

2005–06 concert tour by the Backstreet Boys

- Tour by Backstreet Boys
- Promotional poster for the tour
- Associated album: Never Gone
- Start date: July 22, 2005
- End date: February 2, 2006
- Legs: 3
- No. of shows: 80

Backstreet Boys concert chronology
- Up Close & Personal Tour (2005); Never Gone Tour (2005–2006); Unbreakable Tour (2008–2009)

The Never Gone Tour is the sixth headlining concert tour by American boy band, the Backstreet Boys. The tour was launched in support of their fifth studio album, Never Gone (2005). It is the last BSB tour with all five members of the group, as Kevin Richardson left the band shortly after the tour concluded on June 23, 2006. However, Richardson permanently returned to the band on April 29, 2012.

The tour grossed an estimated $49.5 million within 79 tour dates.

== Opening acts ==
- The Click Five (North America, select dates)
- Jonas Brothers (North America, select dates)
- Devon Werkheiser (North America, November/December 2005 dates only)
- Seminole County (North America, select dates)
- Son of Dork (United Kingdom, all dates)

== Setlist ==
The following setlist was obtained from the concert held on August 26, 2005, at the Dodge Theatre in Phoenix, Arizona. It does not represent all concerts for the duration of the tour.

- "Video Sequence"

Act 1

1. "The Call"
2. "My Beautiful Woman"
3. "More than That"
4. "Climbing the Walls"
5. "Shape of My Heart"
- "Video Sequence" (contains elements of "Don't Want You Back")

Act 2

6. "The One"
7. "I Still..."
8. "I Want It That Way"
9. "Show Me the Meaning of Being Lonely"
10. "Larger than Life"
11. "Siberia"
- "Video Sequence" (contains elements of "We've Got It Goin' On")

Act 3

12. "All I Have to Give"
13. "As Long As You Love Me"
14. "I'll Never Break Your Heart"
15. "Just Want You to Know"
16. "Crawling Back to You"
17. "Quit Playing Games (with My Heart)"
- "Video Sequence" (contains elements of "Never Gone")

Act 4

18. "Weird World"
19. "Drowning"
20. "Incomplete"

Encore

21. "Everybody (Backstreet's Back)"

== Tour dates ==
Date	City	Country	Venue
North America
July 22, 2005	West Palm Beach	United States	Sound Advice Amphitheatre
July 23, 2005	Tampa	United States	Ford Amphitheatre
July 24, 2005	Duluth	United States	The Arena at Gwinnett Center
July 26, 2005	Cleveland	United States	Tower City Amphitheater
July 27, 2005	New York City	United States	Radio City Music Hall
July 29, 2005	Atlantic City	United States	Borgata Events Center
July 30, 2005	Wantagh	United States	Tommy Hilfiger at Jones Beach Theater
July 31, 2005	Holmdel Township	United States	PNC Bank Arts Center
August 2, 2005	Toronto	Canada	Molson Amphitheatre
August 3, 2005	Clarkston	United States	DTE Energy Music Theatre
August 4, 2005	Darien	United States	Darien Lake Performing Arts Center
August 6, 2005	Bristow	United States	Nissan Pavilion
August 7, 2005	Saratoga Springs	United States	Saratoga Performing Arts Center
August 9, 2005	Hartford	United States	ctnow.com Meadows Music Theatre
August 10, 2005	Portland	United States	Cumberland County Civic Center
August 12, 2005	Hershey	United States	Star Pavilion
August 13, 2005	Camden	United States	Tweeter Center
August 14, 2005	Mansfield	United States	Tweeter Center for the Performing Arts
August 16, 2005	Cincinnati	United States	Riverbend Music Center
August 17, 2005	Burgettstown	United States	Post-Gazette Pavilion
August 19, 2005	Chicago	United States	Charter One Pavilion
August 20, 2005	Minneapolis	United States	Target Center
August 21, 2005	Bonner Springs	United States	Verizon Wireless Amphitheater
August 23, 2005	Loveland	United States	Budweiser Events Center
August 25, 2005	Irvine	United States	Verizon Wireless Amphitheatre
August 26, 2005	Phoenix	United States	Dodge Theatre
August 27, 2005	Las Vegas	United States	Mandalay Bay Events Center
August 30, 2005	Concord	United States	Chronicle Pavilion
August 31, 2005	Wheatland	United States	Sleep Train Amphitheatre
September 2, 2005	Ridgefield	United States	The Amphitheater at Clark County
September 3, 2005	Vancouver	Canada	General Motors Place
September 4, 2005	Kelowna	Canada	Prospera Place
September 5, 2005	Calgary	Canada	Pengrowth Saddledome
September 7, 2005	Winnipeg	Canada	MTS Centre
September 10, 2005	Kitchener	Canada	Kitchener Memorial Auditorium
September 11, 2005	London	Canada	John Labatt Centre
September 12, 2005	Ottawa	Canada	Corel Centre
September 13, 2005	Montreal	Canada	Bell Centre
Europe
September 28, 2005	Stockholm	Sweden	Stockholm Globe Arena
September 29, 2005	Oslo	Norway	Oslo Spektrum
October 2, 2005	Helsinki	Finland	Hartwall Areena
October 4, 2005	Aalborg	Denmark	Gigantium
October 5, 2005	Hamburg	Germany	Color Line Arena
October 6, 2005	Dresden	Germany	Messehalle
October 8, 2005	Stuttgart	Germany	Hanns-Martin-Schleyer-Halle
October 9, 2005	Zürich	Switzerland	Hallenstadion
October 10, 2005	Milan	Italy	FilaForum
October 12, 2005	Rotterdam	Netherlands	Ahoy Rotterdam
October 13, 2005	Mannheim	Germany	SAP Arena
October 14, 2005	Munich	Germany	Olympiahalle
October 16, 2005	Berlin	Germany	Max-Schmeling-Halle
October 17, 2005	Oberhausen	Germany	König Pilsener Arena
October 18, 2005	Brussels	Belgium	Forest National
October 20, 2005	London	England	Wembley Arena
October 21, 2005	London	England	Wembley Arena
October 23, 2005	Dublin	Ireland	Point Theatre
October 25, 2005	Manchester	England	Manchester Evening News Arena
October 26, 2005	Birmingham	England	NEC Arena
October 29, 2005	Hanover	Germany	TUI Arena
October 30, 2005	Cologne	Germany	Kölnarena
October 31, 2005	Freiburg	Germany	Messehalle
November 2, 2005	Bologna	Italy	PalaMalaguti
November 5, 2005	Nuremberg	Germany	Nuremberg Arena
November 8, 2005	Badalona	Spain	Palau Municipal d'Esports
November 9, 2005	Madrid	Spain	Palacio de Deportes
November 11, 2005	Lisbon	Portugal	Pavilhão Atlântico
Asia
January 7, 2006	Tokyo	Japan	Tokyo Dome
January 8, 2006	Tokyo	Japan	Tokyo Dome
January 10, 2006	Nagoya	Japan	Nagoya Rainbow Hall
January 12, 2006	Osaka	Japan	Osaka Dome
January 14, 2006	Seoul	South Korea	Olympic Gymnastics Arena
January 16, 2006	Beijing	China	Capital Indoor Stadium
January 18, 2006	Shanghai	China	Shanghai Indoor Stadium
January 20, 2006	Quezon City	Philippines	Araneta Coliseum
January 22, 2006	Bangkok	Thailand	Impact Arena
January 24, 2006	Kallang	Singapore	Singapore Indoor Stadium
Australia
January 28, 2006	Brisbane	Australia	Brisbane Entertainment Centre
January 30, 2006	Sydney	Australia	Sydney Entertainment Centre
February 1, 2006	Adelaide	Australia	Adelaide Entertainment Centre
February 2, 2006	Melbourne	Australia	Rod Laver Arena

=== Box office score data ===
Venue	City	Tickets sold / Available	Gross revenue
Molson Amphitheatre	Toronto	15,880 / 15,880 (100%)	$577,006
Bell Centre	Montreal	11,191 / 12,000 (93%)	$563,801
Point Theatre	Dublin	8,148 / 8,148 (100%)	$405,384
Brisbane Entertainment Centre	Brisbane	4,866 / 5,232 (93%)	$314,608
Sydney Entertainment Centre	Sydney	9,000 / 9,000 (100%)	$581,585
Adelaide Entertainment Centre	Adelaide	4,689 / 6,500 (72%)	$291,103
Rod Laver Arena	Melbourne	11,000 / 11,000 (100%)	$682,982
TOTAL		64,774 / 67,760 (96%)	$3,416,469
