= Unbreakable (Backstreet Boys album) =

Studio album by Backstreet Boys
- Released: October 24, 2007
- Recorded: June 25, 2006 – July 14, 2007
- Studios: Sound Kitchen (Nashville, Tennessee); Westlake, Chalice, Henson (Hollywood, California); The Village Recorder (Los Angeles); Turtle Sound (New York City)
- Genres: Pop; R&B; pop rock; dance-pop
- Length: 48:50
- Label: Jive
- Producers: Mitch Allan; Adam Anders; JC Chasez; Kara DioGuardi; David Hodges; Emanuel Kiriakou; Billy Mann; Dan Muckala; Neff-U; John Shanks; Rob Wells

Backstreet Boys chronology
Never Gone (2005)	Unbreakable (2007)	This Is Us (2009)

Singles from Unbreakable
- 1. "Inconsolable" Released: August 27, 2007; 2. "Helpless When She Smiles" Released: January 15, 2008

Unbreakable is the sixth studio album (fifth in the United States) by American group Backstreet Boys. It was released on October 24, 2007 in Japan, followed by a worldwide release. The album marked the group's first release as a quartet, following Kevin Richardson's departure in 2006 to pursue other interests. It was also their first album without the involvement of longtime collaborators Max Martin and Kristian Lundin, who had worked on all of the group’s previous albums, with Dan Muckala assuming a larger role in the album's production.

The album received mixed reviews from critics, with praise for its polished harmonies, mature and radio-friendly pop sound, while others criticized it for a lack of standout songs and innovation. Unbreakable achieved strong international success, topping the charts in Japan and Taiwan, reaching the top ten across Europe, and debuting at number seven on the US Billboard 200, though its North American sales were lower and its chart run shorter than previous releases, with worldwide sales reaching 1.7 million copies.

"Inconsolable" and "Helpless When She Smiles" were released as singles from Unbreakable, both of which received music videos, with "Inconsolable" reaching the top ten in Italy and Switzerland. The group promoted the album with the 99-date Unbreakable Tour across Asia, Australia, the Americas, and Europe from 2008 to 2009. Originally Backstreet Boys' first tour as a quartet, Richardson rejoined the group for the final show, though he did not return permanently until 2012.

== Background ==
Following the commercial success of their fourth studio album Black & Blue (2000) and their return from a brief hiatus, Backstreet Boys released Never Gone in 2005, marking a shift toward pop rock and a more mature sound. The album received mixed reviews but sold over three million copies worldwide, supported by the lead single "Incomplete" and the nearly 80-date Never Gone Tour. On June 23, 2006, several months after the end of the tour, it was announced that original member Kevin Richardson had left the Backstreet Boys to pursue other interests. Both Richardson and the rest of the group issued a statement on their official site, stating that he departed amicably and the door was always open for him to return. Following Richardson's departure, the group turned down an offer to star in a reality show to find a new member and stated that they were not planning to replace him.

In July 2007, it was announced that the remaining members of the group would release a new album on October 30, 2007, marking their first album of new material in two years. Early rumors suggested titles such as End to Beginning, before Brian Littrell and AJ McLean confirmed on August 13, 2007, that the album would be titled Unbreakable. Members of the Backstreet Boys themselves co-wrote five tracks on this album along with longtime songwriter Jeremy Carpenter. Footage of the Backstreet Boys in pre-production and recording the album were featured on the reality series House of Carters. Musically, the band described Unbreakable as "a little bit of old and new," with the album blending adult contemporary and contemporary pop, incorporating interwoven choral harmonies, piano, strings, guitar, and drums.

The group stated that Take That's recent comeback and music was an inspiration for the album.

== Composition ==
For Unbreakable, Backstreet Boys moved away from the Max Martin–driven sound of their early hits, instead collaborating with a variety of producers to craft a more mature, adult vocal-group style. Dan Muckala, who co-wrote and produced the group's previous single "Incomplete" from their previous album Never Gone, handled the majority of the album's production, while Emanuel Kiriakou, John Shanks, and Billy Mann also contributed. JC Chasez of *NSYNC additionally collaborated on the album, providing production and songwriting for several upbeat pop tracks.

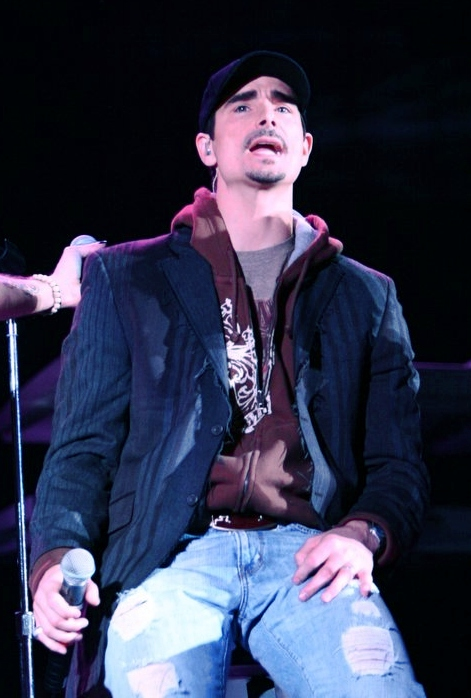
Unbreakable was the group's first album without member Kevin Richardson.

The closing track of the album, "Unsuspecting Sunday Afternoon", is broken into two different parts. The first part leads off the album, and is a one-minute a cappella version of the chorus, listed as "Intro" on the record. The second track "Everything But Mine" is a synth-heavy dance track produced by Muckala. It strays from typical BSB territory with its electro inspired offbeat riff. The third song and lead single "Inconsolable" was produced by Emanuel Kiriakou and written by Emmanuel, Lindy Robbins and Jess Cates. It features the trademark emotional boy band romantic lyrics with very heartfelt vocals. "Something That I Already Know" was described as "a classic Backstreet Boys pop-rock ballad". The song is co-written by Kara DioGuardi and David Hodges and also features "slick power-ballad choruses." "Helpless When She Smiles" was produced by Shanks and is another pop ballad. It is a more visionary offering with an intriguing piano melody that provides some edge. The sixth track "Any Other Way" traffics in clips of funk guitar and drums comparable to Maroon 5. It is a funk rocker with a minor-key tune.

"One in a Million", which conjures memories of the stuttering eight-note beats of "Larger Than Life", has elements of hip hop and reggae. The eighth track "Panic" add rock elements to the group's sound and is another more adventurous outing; beginning with a dubby drum and bass rhythm. "You Can Let Go" was described as a "dreamy" ballad, while "Trouble Is" was deemed as "another big ballad with a mildly rootsy groove, that could actually do well on country radio, where melodrama rules. The eleventh track "Treat Me Right," co-written and produced by Chasez, was deemed as "the standout track" on the album. It is an electropop song and utilises the group's vocal interplay to admirable effect. "Love Will Keep You Up All Night" was classified as a "montage of almost every love-song ever written and with a chorus reminiscent of Aerosmith's 'I Don't Want to Miss a Thing'." "Unmistakable" was considered "one of the stronger tracks on the album." The song features very strong vocal arrangements and instrumentation. The second part of "Unsuspecting Sunday Afternoon" closes out the album, and is about three and half minutes in length. Commencing with only a piano, the song then adds a live drum beat and orchestral instruments, followed by an electric guitar solo and atmospheric harmonies. All four members co-wrote the song and hailed it as the best song in the album.

== Promotion ==
"Inconsolable" was released as the album's first single from the album. Written and produced by Emanuel Kiriakou, and co-written by Lindy Robbins and Jess Cates, it was issued to US radio outlets on August 27, 2007. The song entered the top 10 in Italy and Switzerland, reaching numbers two and eight, respectively. On October 2, 2007, the tracks, "Unmistakable" and "Something That I Already Know" were released on Promosquad and RateTheMusic. The next day, a Japanese radio station leaked the intro of the album, along with the track, "Everything But Mine".

"Helpless When She Smiles," produced by John Shanks, served as the second single from Unbreakable. Originally written in 2004 for Rascal Flatts, the song was first recorded by Dutch singer Bastiaan Ragas in 2005 and later by German singer Mike Leon Grosch in 2006 before being recorded by the Backstreet Boys. "Helpless When She Smiles" reached the top 40 of the German Singles Chart. A music video for the song was filmed on November 13, 2007, at Joshua Tree National Park in California and premiered on Yahoo! Music on December 12, 2007.

=== Unbreakable Tour ===
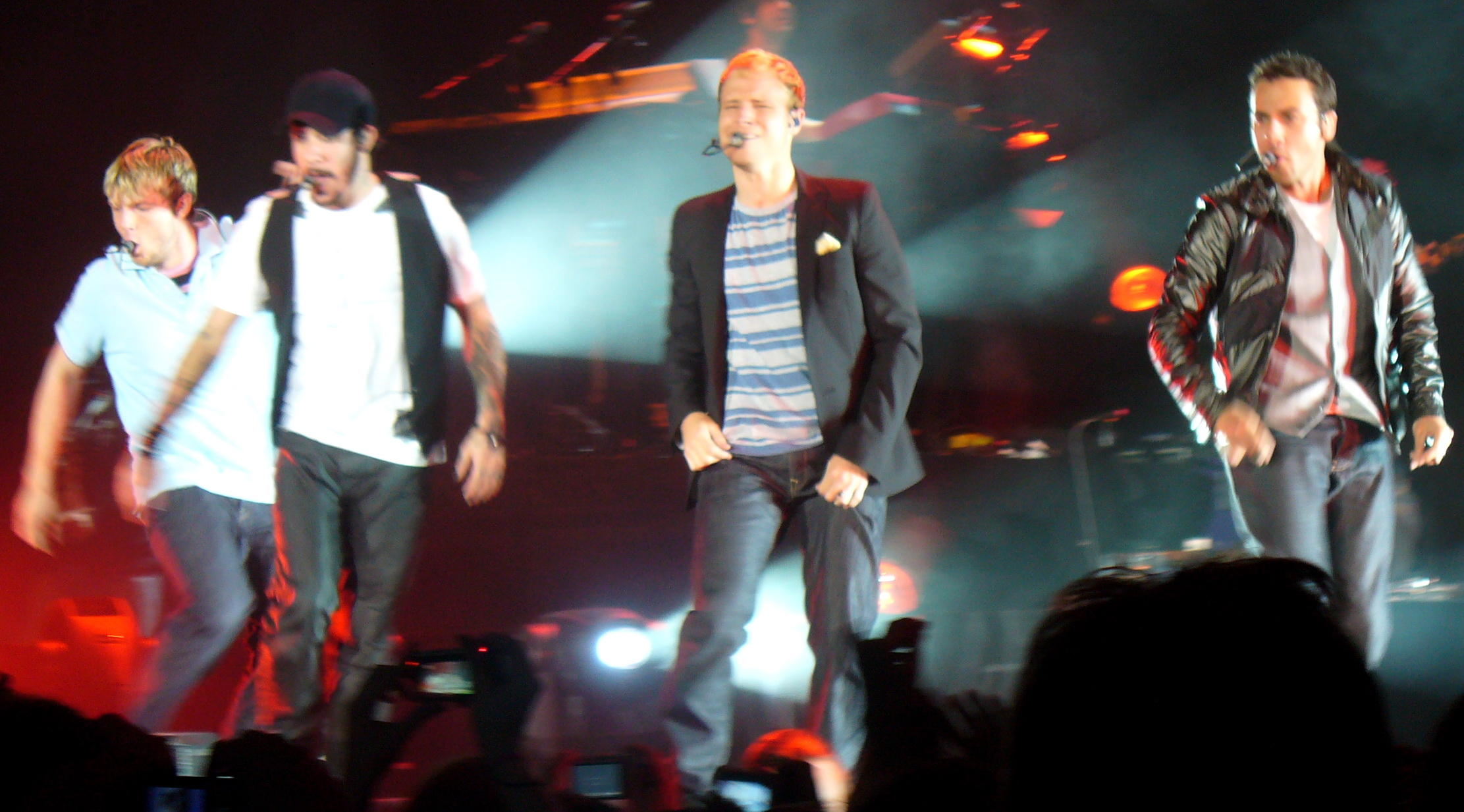
Carter, McLean, Littrell, and Dorough performing in April 2008.

Backstreet Boys launched the Unbreakable Tour on February 16, 2008, in Japan, concluding on March 13, 2009, in Mexico. The tour included 99 shows across Asia, Australia, North America, Eastern and Western Europe, and South America, and aimed to visit countries the group had not toured in years as well as new territories, including Russia, Latvia, Estonia, and Peru. Planned dates in South Africa were canceled following the death of Howie Dorough's father Hoke. A show in Luxembourg was suspended after a fire broke out at the Rockhal venue on the day of the performance. No one was seriously injured, although the group's wardrobe sustained damage. The tour featured a variety of opening acts, including Brian McFadden, Stanfour, E.M.D., George Nozuka, Girlicious, Divine Brown, Kreesha Turner, Donnie Klang, Belanova, and Ádammo. Originally announced as the first Backstreet Boys tour as a quartet, Kevin Richardson rejoined the group for the final show in Los Angeles and later returned permanently on April 29, 2012.

== Critical reception ==
Professional ratings
Aggregate scores
Source	Rating
Metacritic	56/100
Review scores
Source	Rating
About.com	4/5 stars
AllMusic	3/5 stars
The A.V. Club	C−
Entertainment.ie	2.5/5 stars
Entertainment Weekly	B−
Evening Standard	3/5 stars
Rolling Stone	2/5 stars
Virgin Media	2.5/5 stars

Unbreakable received generally mixed reviews from most music critics. At Metacritic, which assigns a normalized rating out of 100 to reviews from mainstream critics, the album received an average score of 56, based on 8 reviews. Bill Lamb from About.com gave the album four out of five stars, praising "the incomparably lush harmonies and instantly pleasing melodies" and labeling the songs "radio friendly." Lamb also commented that the band "have settled into a comfortable place as an adult vocal group" and named the album "a pure pop pleasure." Tammy LaGorce from Amazon.com judged that the album "boasts Super Glue-strength harmonies and an overall tightness of sound" and that "the music is more thoughtful and mature than ever." Simon Vozick-Levinson of Entertainment Weekly judged that "They come close to recreating the sheer euphoria of their biggest pre-Y2K smashes on many of the up-tempo dance-pop numbers that follow," while Paul Connolly, writing for The Evening Standard, remarked that Unbreakable "just about manages to walk the fine line between mature and pop without becoming boring."

Stephen Thomas Erlewine from AllMusic gave the album three out of five stars, writing that "the basic sound of the album is good, but the problem is that few of the songs stick. Here, the Backstreet Boys don't have any songs that will lift them out of the adult contemporary world — but the audience who has turned from teens to adults with them will likely enjoy its easy sound, as there is nothing bad here. There's just nothing great, either." Gemma Padley of BBC Music felt that the album "is a valiant effort at reinvention and an at times gutsier record." Matt O'Leary from Virgin Media opined that "while there is nothing to match their crowning glory — karaoke classic "I Want It That Way" — this is a largely inoffensive collection of pop hits. It's bound to be huge." Lauren Murphy from Entertainment.ie called Unbreakable "far from the perfect pop album — in fact, it's rather boring for the most part — but it does confirm that Backstreet Boys aren't quite ready for the scrap heap just yet." Christian Hoard from Rolling Stone gave the album two out of five stars, summarizing that "Unbreakable makes small nods to adult pop, peppering the processed music with tasteful piano and light guitar riffs and keeping bright, danceable grooves to a minimum. But the material stinks worse than ever."

== Commercial performance ==
Unbreakable achieved strong international chart success upon its release. The album topped the charts in Taiwan and debuted at number one in Japan on the Oricon Albums Chart, marking some of the group's strongest performances in Asia. It sold 102,043 copies in its first week in Japan and remained at number one in its second week, surpassing all domestic Japanese releases during that period, a rare achievement for an international act. The album has since sold approximately 400,000 copies in Japan. Across Europe, the album performed consistently well, reaching the top ten in several countries, including Germany (number four), Spain (number seven), Switzerland (number six), and the pan-European Top 100 Albums chart (number eight). It also entered the top twenty in the Netherlands, Italy, Portugal, Austria, and the United Kingdom.

In North America, it peaked at number two in Canada and opened at number seven on the US Billboard 200 with first week sales of 81,000 copies, becoming Backstreet Boys' sixth consecutive top-ten album in the United States. Compared to the group's previous releases, Unbreakable's domestic sales accounted for a significantly smaller share of its overall commercial performance, and with only five weeks on the Billboard 200, it had a considerably shorter chart run than its predecessors. By March 2015, it had sold 229,000 copies in the United States. Worldwide, the album has sold 1.7 million copies.

== Track listing ==
Unbreakable track listing
No.	Title	Writer(s)	Producer(s)	Length
1.	"Intro"			0:58
2.	"Everything But Mine"	Dan Muckala; Jess Cates; Lindy Robbins	Muckala	4:06
3.	"Inconsolable"	Cates; Emanuel Kiriakou; Robbins	Kiriakou	3:37
4.	"Something That I Already Know"	Mitch Allan; Zukhan Bey; Kara DioGuardi; David Hodges	Allan; DioGuardi; Hodges	3:29
5.	"Helpless When She Smiles"	Brett James; Aimee Mayo; Troy Verges; Chris Lindsey	John Shanks	4:05
6.	"Any Other Way"	Muckala; Cates; Robbins	Muckala	3:23
7.	"One in a Million"	Brian Littrell; AJ McLean; Howie Dorough; Nick Carter; Muckala; Cates; Robbins	Muckala	3:32
8.	"Panic"	Littrell; McLean; Dorough; Carter; Muckala; Billy Mann	Muckala	2:54
9.	"You Can Let Go"	Muckala; Cates; Robbins	Muckala	3:32
10.	"Trouble Is"	Pam Sheyne; Martin Sutton; Don Mescall	Shanks	3:33
11.	"Treat Me Right"	JC Chasez; Ron Feemster; McLean	Neff-U; Chasez^{[a]}	4:10
12.	"Love Will Keep You Up All Night"	Mann; LP	Mann	4:14
13.	"Unmistakable"	Muckala; Adam Anders; Nikki Hassman	Muckala; Anders	3:48
14.	"Unsuspecting Sunday Afternoon"	Littrell; McLean; Dorough; Carter; Mann; Muckala	Muckala	3:21
Total length:				48:50

Japanese edition bonus tracks
No.	Title	Writer(s)	Producer(s)	Length
15.	"Close My Eyes"	Muckala; Cates; Robbins; Littrell; McLean; Dorough; Carter	Muckala	4:06
16.	"There's Us"	Rob Wells; Christopher Ward	Wells	4:10

U.S., Europe limited edition bonus tracks
No.	Title	Writer(s)	Producer(s)	Length
15.	"Downpour"	Cates; Robbins; Kiriakou	Kiriakou	3:22
16.	"In Pieces"	Muckala; Cates; Robbins	Muckala	3:42

Walmart, Australia, New Zealand, Mexico & Canada limited deluxe edition bonus tracks
No.	Title	Writer(s)	Producer(s)	Length
15.	"Downpour"	Cates; Robbins; Kiriakou	Kiriakou	3:22
16.	"In Pieces"	Muckala; Cates; Robbins	Muckala	3:42
17.	"There's Us"	Wells; Ward	Wells	4:10

Japanese limited deluxe edition/Asian tour edition bonus tracks
No.	Title	Writer(s)	Producer(s)	Length
17.	"Nowhere to Go"	Cates; Robbins; Wells	Wells	2:52
18.	"Inconsolable" (Jason Nevins radio mix)	Cates; Robbins; Kiriakou	Kiriakou; Jason Nevins^{[b]}	4:11
19.	"Helpless When She Smiles" (Jason Nevins radio mix)	James; Lindsey; Mayo; Verges	Shanks; Nevins^{[b]}	4:24
20.	"Satellite"	Muckala; Ralf Hamm	Muckala	3:29

Asian tour edition bonus DVD
No.	Title	Length
1.	"Inconsolable" (music video)
2.	"Inconsolable" (making of the video)
3.	"Helpless When She Smiles" (music video)
4.	"Helpless When She Smiles" (making of the video)
5.	"9 Days in Tokyo" (documentary)

Notes

- ^a signifies a vocal producer
- ^b signifies additional producer(s)

== Personnel ==
Credits adapted from album's liner notes. The track numbers correspond to the Australia, Europe, Mexico & Canada deluxe edition.

Lead vocalists

- Nick Carter
- Howie Dorough
- Brian Littrell
- AJ McLean

Musicians

- Dan Muckala – keyboards (2, 6–9, 13, 14, 16), arrangements (2, 6, 7, 13, 14), programming (2, 7, 8, 13, 16), acoustic piano (9, 13, 14)
- Emanuel Kiriakou – acoustic piano (3, 15), keyboards (3, 15), programming (3, 15), acoustic guitar (3, 15), electric guitar (3, 15), bass (3, 15), percussion (3, 15)
- David Hodges – acoustic piano (4), keyboards (4)
- Zukhan Bey – programming (4)
- John Shanks – keyboards (5, 10), guitars (5, 10)
- Jamie Muhoberac – additional keyboards (5, 10)
- Theron "Neff-U" Feemster – all programming (11)
- Pete Wallace – acoustic piano (12)
- Rob Wells – programming (17)
- Chuck Butler – electric guitar (2, 6, 8, 9, 13, 14, 16), bass guitar (2, 6, 7, 9, 14, 16), acoustic guitar (7–9)
- Mitch Allan – guitars (4), bass (4)
- Adam Lester – electric guitar (6, 7, 13, 16), acoustic guitar (13)
- Josh Muckala – electric guitar (7)
- Billy Mann – guitars (12), arrangements (12)
- Dave Schuler – guitars (12), arrangements (12)
- Greg Johnston – guitars (17), bass (17)
- David Thompson – additional guitars (17)
- Paul Bushnell – bass (5, 10)
- Adam Anders – bass (13)
- Jeremy Lutito – drums (2, 6, 9)
- Dorian Crozier – drums (3, 4, 15)
- Vinnie Colaiuta – drums (5, 10)
- Dan Chase – drum programming (5, 10)
- Jeff Rothschild – drum programming (10)
- Lee Levin – drums (12)
- Stevie Black – strings (4)
- Larry Gold – string arrangements (12)
- John Catchings – cello (16)
- Monisa Angell – viola (16)
- Kristin Wilkinson – viola (16)
- David Davidson – violin (13, 14, 16)
- David Angell – violin (16)
- Jeff Pitzer – violin (16)
- Pam Sixfin – violin (16)
- Mary Katherine Vandosdale – violin (16)

Production

- Teresa LaBarbera Whites – A&R executive
- Dan Muckala – producer (2, 6–9, 13, 14, 16)
- Emanuel Kiriakou – producer (3, 15)
- Mitch Allan – producer (4)
- Kara DioGuardi – producer (4)
- David Hodges – producer (4)
- John Shanks – producer (5, 10)
- Theron "Neff-U" Feemster – producer (11)
- JC Chasez – vocal producer and vocal arrangements (11)
- Billy Mann – producer (12)
- Adam Anders – producer (13)
- Rob Wells – producer (17)
- Jenny Prince – A&R coordinator
- Nancy Roof – A&R administration
- Shari Sutcliffe – production coordinator (5, 10), music contractor (5, 10)
- Denise Trotman – art direction, design
- Ray Kay – photography
- Neger Ali – stylist
- Frankie Payne – grooming
- The Firm, Inc. – management

Technical

- Tom Coyne – mastering at Sterling Sound (New York, NY)
- Chris Lord-Alge – mixing (2–10, 12, 13, 15–17)
- Dan Muckala – recording (2, 6–9, 13, 14, 16)
- Matty Green – engineer (3)
- Pat Thrall – engineer (3), digital editing (3, 15), recording (15)
- Chris Brooke – drum recording (3, 15)
- Mitch Allan – guitar recording (4)
- Dan Certa – bass and piano recording (4)
- Brian Paturalski – vocal recording (4)
- Jeff Rothschild – recording (5, 10)
- Steve Durkee – recording (11), mixing (11)
- Billy Mann – recording (12)
- Dave Schuler – recording (12)
- Pete Wallace – recording (12)
- F. Reid Shippen – mixing (14)
- Emanuel Kiriakou – recording (15)
- Brett Paschke – recording (15)
- Ed Cherney – drum recording (15)
- Chris Anderson – recording (17)
- Jason Rankins – recording (17)
- David Hodges – additional recording (4)
- Lars Fox – Pro Tools editing (5, 10)
- Nik Karpen – mix assistant (2–10, 12, 13, 15–17)
- Steve Beers – recording assistant (2, 7, 8, 14)
- Josh Muckala – recording assistant (2, 6–9, 13, 14, 16)
- Brian Warwick – drum recording assistant (3, 15)
- Dave Colvin – assistant engineer (4)
- Kevin Mills – recording assistant (5, 10)
- Buckley Miller – mix assistant (14)
- Jeff Pitzer – recording assistant (16)
- Brian Naguit – assistant engineer (17)

== Charts ==
Chart (2007)	Peak position
Argentine Albums (CAPIF)	6
Australian Albums (ARIA)	25
Austrian Albums (Ö3 Austria)	21
Belgian Albums (Ultratop Flanders)	47
Belgian Albums (Ultratop Wallonia)	37
Canadian Albums (Billboard)	2
Danish Albums (Hitlisten)	36
Dutch Albums (Album Top 100)	10
European Top 100 Albums (Billboard)	8
Finnish Albums (Suomen virallinen lista)	27
French Albums (SNEP)	127
German Albums (Offizielle Top 100)	4
Irish Albums (IRMA)	26
Italian Albums (FIMI)	15
Italian Albums (Musica e Dischi)	15
Japanese Albums (Oricon)	1
Mexican Albums (Top 100 Mexico)	23
Portuguese Albums (AFP)	18
Scottish Albums (OCC)	29
Spanish Albums (Promusicae)	7
Swedish Albums (Sverigetopplistan)	28
Swiss Albums (Schweizer Hitparade)	6
Taiwanese Albums (Five Music)	1
UK Albums (Official Charts)	21
US Billboard 200	7

== Certifications ==
Region	Certification	Certified units/sales
Brazil (Pro-Música Brasil)	Platinum	60,000^{‡}
Canada (Music Canada)	Gold	50,000^{^}
Japan (RIAJ)	Platinum	250,000^{^}
Russia (NFPF)	Gold	10,000^{*}
United States	—	229,000
^{*} Sales figures based on certification alone.^{^} Shipments figures based on certification alone.^{‡} Sales+streaming figures based on certification alone.

== Release history ==
Region	Date
Japan	October 24, 2007
Belgium	October 26, 2007
Finland	October 26, 2007
Germany	October 26, 2007
Italy	October 26, 2007
Netherlands	October 26, 2007
Norway	October 26, 2007
Poland	October 26, 2007
Sweden	October 26, 2007
Australia	October 27, 2007
Austria	October 27, 2007
Denmark	October 27, 2007
Ireland	October 27, 2007
New Zealand	October 27, 2007
Switzerland	October 27, 2007

Region	Date
Czech Republic	October 29, 2007
France	October 29, 2007
Greece	October 29, 2007
Portugal	October 29, 2007
Spain	October 29, 2007
Ukraine	October 29, 2007
United Kingdom	October 29, 2007
Canada	October 30, 2007
Mexico	October 30, 2007
United States	October 30, 2007
Israel	October 31, 2007
Thailand	October 31, 2007

Region	Date
China	November 2, 2007
Hong Kong	November 2, 2007
Philippines	November 2, 2007
Malaysia	November 2, 2007
Taiwan	November 2, 2007
Vietnam	November 2, 2007
Russia	November 5, 2007
Brazil	November 10, 2007
Indonesia	November 16, 2007
India	November 22, 2007
Korea	November 22, 2007
Singapore	November 22, 2007
