= Never Gone =

Studio album by Backstreet Boys
- Released: June 14, 2005
- Recorded: December 2003 – February 2005
- Studios: Westlake Audio, Henson Recording, Conway Recording (Hollywood, California); Dr. Luke's New York, Turtle Sound (New York City); Woodland Ranch (Woodland Hills, California); Maratone (Stockholm, Sweden); The Village Recorder, The Underlab (Los Angeles, California)
- Genre: Pop
- Length: 47:41
- Label: Jive
- Producers: Johan Brorson; Dr. Luke; John Fields; Billy Mann; Max Martin; Dan Muckala; Christian Nilsson; John Shanks; Supa'Flyas; Mark Taylor; Gregg Wattenberg; Paul Wiltshire; Victoria Wu; Rami

Backstreet Boys chronology
The Hits – Chapter One (2001)	Never Gone (2005)	Unbreakable (2007)

Singles from Never Gone
- 1. "Incomplete" Released: April 11, 2005; 2. "Just Want You to Know" Released: July 18, 2005; 3. "Crawling Back to You" Released: October 24, 2005; 4. "I Still..." Released: November 25, 2005

Never Gone is the fifth studio album (fourth in the United States) by American vocal group Backstreet Boys. It was released by Jive Records on June 14, 2005, as the successor to their fourth studio album Black & Blue (2000), after a few years' hiatus. The album differs musically from their previous albums, shifting from teen pop into pop rock tendencies. Unlike previous albums, it featured only live instruments. The album's title track is inspired by the death of Kevin Richardson's father, Jerald, who was also Brian Littrell's uncle.

Originally due for release in 2004, Never Gone received mixed to negative reviews, with critics noting the band's shift to a more mature sound but finding the album safe and lacking the energy of their earlier hits. It opened number one in Germany and Greece and charted within the top ten in the majority of countries where it appeared. The album was certified gold and platinum in multiple countries and has sold over 3 million copies worldwide by 2007, including 1.8 million copies in the United States.

The album's singles, led by "Incomplete," achieved strong international success, topping the Australian charts and reaching the top ten in several European countries, while later singles performed moderately in the United States and Europe. To further promote Never Gone, Backstreet Boys embarked on a 2005 club tour and the nearly 80-date Never Gone Tour across North America, Europe, Asia, and Australia, receiving generally positive reviews.

== Background ==
In November 2000, Backstreet Boys released their fourth studio album Black & Blue, which achieved record-breaking commercial success by selling over five million copies worldwide in its first week. The album went on to sell more than 15 million copies globally, and spawned the singles "Shape of My Heart", "The Call" and "More than That." To promote the album, the band embarked on the Black & Blue World Tour, which spanned five continents. The tour was suspended in July 2001, when member AJ McLean entered rehabilitation for alcoholism and depression, leading the group to take a sabbatical. During the break, Howie Dorough explored real estate and an English/Spanish album; Brian Littrell had a son and signed a deal for a Christian album; Kevin Richardson performed in London and on Broadway in the musical Chicago; Nick Carter released his solo album Now or Never (2002), which underperformed commercially and contributed to legal disputes with Jive Records and tensions within the group. Following management changes, Backstreet Boys reunited publicly in late 2003 on The Oprah Winfrey Show, with the rest of the band surprising McLean, sparking the reunion. Shortly after, they resumed working with longtime collaborator Johnny Wright.

== Production ==
Never Gone was created following a nearly five-year hiatus, during which the Backstreet Boys pursued individual projects, leading to uncertainty about the viability of their return as former teen-pop stars. Recording began in early 2004 with initial sessions alongside R&B producers The Underdogs, though early experiments, including attempts at trend-driven and rap-oriented material, failed to resonate with the group. Seeking a more natural direction, the band ultimately reconnected with longtime collaborator Max Martin, despite initial mutual hesitation due to the perceived overexposure of their earlier pop sound. The partnership was renewed after BMG chairman Clive Davis identified Martin's demo "Climbing the Walls" as a strong fit for the group, leading Martin to contribute to four of the album's twelve tracks. Overall, production shifted toward a more adult pop-rock and adult contemporary style, emphasizing melody, vocal harmony, and guitar-driven arrangements, with additional work from producers such as John Shanks, John Fields, John Ondrasik, Mark Taylor and Gregg Wattenberg. In an interview with Billboard, Howie Dorough elaborated: "It's not all five-part harmony like everything used to be. It's like Backstreet Boys meets Matchbox Twenty meets Maroon5 meets Coldplay."

== Promotion ==
=== Singles ===
"Incomplete," produced by Dan Muckala, was released as the album's first single to US radios on March 28, 2005. Released to a strong start in its first week at radio outlets, the song debuted at number 55 on Billboard US Hot 100. It eventually peaked at number 13, earning a gold certification from the Recording Industry Association of America (RIAA) for selling over half a million copies in the US, and also reached the top 10 in several European countries. In Australia, it debuted at number one, giving the group their only number-one hit there, and received a double-platinum sales certification. A video for "Incomplete" was shot with director Joseph Kahn and premiered on AOL Music's First View program on April 25, 2005.

Never Gone's second single "Just Want You to Know," co-produced by Dr. Luke, was released in July 2005. While it was less successful in the United States, the song reached the top ten in the United Kingdom and Spain and peaked within the top 20 in Germany, Ireland, and Italy. Directed by Marc Klasfeld and released worldwide on September 3, 2005, two music videos were produced for "Just Want You to Know." Conceptually, they pay tribute to the 1986 documentary Heavy Metal Parking Lot, with Backstreet Boys portraying fans of the fictional heavy metal band Sphynkter.

A third and final US single, "Crawling Back to You," produced by John Fields, was released in October 2005, in support of Music For Hurricane Relief, an organization founded to support the families affected by the catastrophic tropical Hurricane Katrina that had caused extreme damage in late August 2005. The song peaked at number 30 on the US Billboard Adult Contemporary chart. Outside the United States, "I Still...," co-produced by Rami Yacoub, served as the third and final single from Never Gone. Released in November 2005, the song reached the top ten in the Netherlands and top 20 in Australia, while also reaching the top 40 in Hungary, Greece, and Sweden.

=== Performances ===
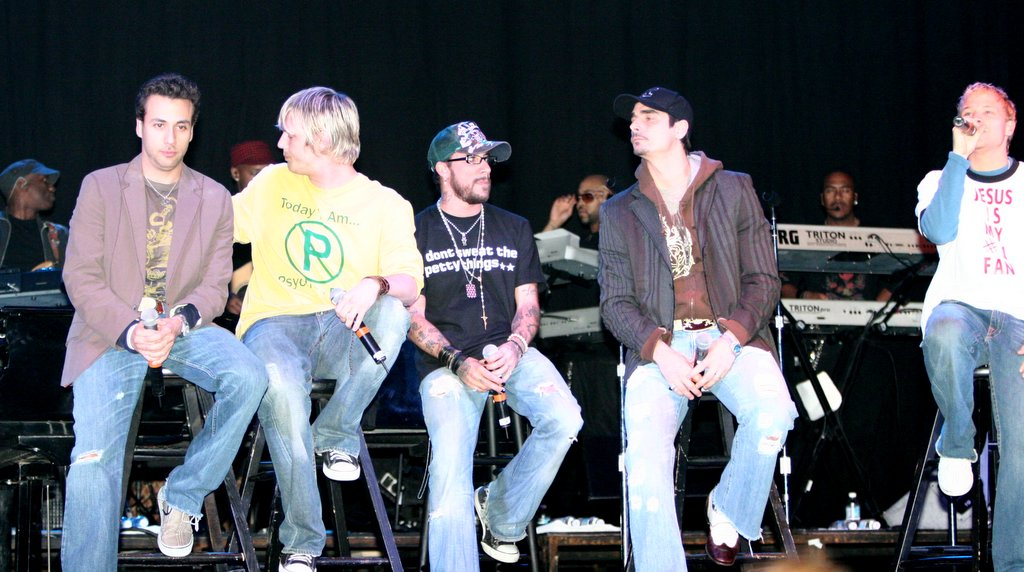
Dorough, Carter, McLean, Richardson, and Littrell performing in December 2005.

To give fans a preview of the new album, the group embarked on an 18-date "warm up club tour" ahead of the album's release. Most shows sold out within just 20 minutes. The tour began on March 21, 2005, in New York City and ended on April 18 in Norfolk, Virginia, and was followed by a summer tour, the Never Gone Tour, which spanned close to 80 dates. Presented by AOL Music, the North American leg of the tour began on July 22 at the Sound Advice Amphitheatre in West Palm Beach, Florida, and ran through September 13 at the Bell Centre in Montreal. From September 28, 2005, to February 2, 2006, the tour continued internationally, covering Europe, Asia, and Australia. The Never Gone Tour received generally positive reviews, with critics noting the band's harmonies, stage presence, and ability to engage both longtime fans and new listeners. To further promote the album, the group made appearances on NBC's morning show Today and talk show The Tonight Show with Jay Leno, ABC's daytime talk show The View and CBS' morning show The Early Show.

== Critical reception ==
Professional ratings
Aggregate scores
Source	Rating
Metacritic	40/100
Review scores
Source	Rating
AllMusic	3/5 stars
Blender	2/5 stars
E! Online	C
Entertainment Weekly	C
People	2/4 stars
PopMatters	2/10
Robert Christgau	C
Rolling Stone	1/5 stars
Sputnikmusic	4.5/5 stars
USA Today	3/4 stars

Critical response to Never Gone was generally mixed to negative, with most critics ambivalent about changing the band's traditional pop style to a more mature adult contemporary sound. At Metacritic, which assigns a normalized rating out of 100 to reviews from mainstream critics, the album has received an average score of 40, based on seven reviews.

AllMusic editor Stephen Thomas Erlewine called the album a "well-made record." He argued that Never Gone was marking a shift from the group's late-1990s teen pop sound to a more adult contemporary style, drawing comparisons to early-1990s Bryan Adams, also critics describing it as a modest but effective evolution rather than a full reinvention. USA Today critic Elysa Gardner described the album as "smartly produced [and] cannily sung," noting that it "should strengthen the adult-contemporary audience that has always been a solid part of this now-grown-up boy band's base. Whether crooning the swooning "Safest Place to Hide" or digging into more rhythmic tracks such as "Poster Girl" and the sinuous "My Beautiful Woman," the group sounds as comfortable and accessible as ever." Less impressed, Dave Karger from Entertainment Weekly called the album a "corny comeback" and found that "while instantly catchy," Never Gone was "quite different from Backstreet's late-'90s synthesized pop." Jon Pareles, writing for The New York Times, described Never Gone as "a very careful rebranding —perhaps that should be reblanding—of an act that wants to resume selling in the millions. It has decided to bet on wholesomeness and predictability."

E! Online found that Never Gone "mostly sounds like a band going through growing pains of its own. The Boys don't really sound like their old, 70-million-album selling selves, but they don't really sound like they're doing anything different either. Even if they aren't Never Gone, their inspiration certainly is." Writing for People, Chuck Taylor found that Bubblegum-flavored cuts like "Poster Girl," a fetching guitar-pop ditty, and "Weird World," with its buoyant "hey hey heys," would be better suited for, say, Jesse McCartney. And rock-tinged tracks like "My Beautiful Woman" fail to bring the desired edge. Backstreet Boys are still smooth crooners on sweet if sappy ballads such as "Safest Place to Hide" and the first single "Incomplete." Rolling Stone's Barry Walters wrote that Never Gone "never attains the dizzy heights of previous hits and never reaches far enough toward new territory [...] Backstreet men rarely accelerate beyond a midtempo thud." Maura McAndrew from PopMatters argued that the Backstreet Boys' overly serious, irony-free image and unchanged sound made them feel stale and joyless, especially as they age without acknowledging their own pop absurdity. She felt that Never Gone "has not offered anyone a reason to like boy bands, and the Backstreet Boys seem content to fade into top forty hell with so many others. But they could at least have the decency to show us their strings."

Despite the mixed reception, the album continues to be well-received by fans, with many of the album tracks ranked as concert favorites. In a 2026 interview, AJ McLean ranked Never Gone as the best Backstreet Boys album, and "Siberia" as his favorite song.

== Commercial performance ==
Prior to its release, Never Gone was predicted to debut at number one on the US Billboard 200, with first-day sales estimates suggesting it could reach around 300,000 copies in its first week. Despite these projections, the album did not achieve the top position, eventually opening at number three, falling short of becoming the group's third number-one album. Selling 293,000 copies in its first week of release, it marked the band's fifth consecutive top ten album however, following The Hits – Chapter One in 2001. On July 14, 2005, Never Gone was certified platinum by the Recording Industry Association of America (RIAA). It has since sold close to 1.8 million copies domestically.

In Japan, Never Gone was the second biggest Western album in 2005 and had sold more than 750,000 copies by January 2006, reaching double platinum status. The album also earned platinum certifications in Australia and Canada, and was awarded gold in Germany, Ireland, Mexico, Portugal, Russia, Spain, Switzerland, and the United Kingdom. By July 2007, the album had sold over 3 million copies worldwide.

== Track listing ==
Never Gone track listing
No.	Title	Writer(s)	Producer(s)	Length
1.	"Incomplete"	Dan Muckala; Jess Cates; Lindy Robbins	Muckala	3:59
2.	"Just Want You to Know"	Max Martin; Lukasz Gottwald	Martin; Dr. Luke	3:53
3.	"Crawling Back to You"	Chris Farren; Blair Daly	John Fields	3:44
4.	"Weird World"	John Ondrasik	Gregg Wattenberg	4:12
5.	"I Still..."	Martin; Rami	Martin; Rami	3:49
6.	"Poster Girl"	Billy Mann; Rasmus Bähncke; René Tromborg	Mann; Supa'Flyas^{[a]}	3:56
7.	"Lose It All"	Wally Gagel; Shelly Peiken; Alexander Barry	Fields	4:04
8.	"Climbing the Walls"	Martin; Gottwald	Martin; Dr. Luke	3:43
9.	"My Beautiful Woman"	Paul Wiltshire; Victoria Wu	Wiltshire; Wu^{[b]}	3:38
10.	"Safest Place to Hide"	Tom Leonard; Robin Lerner	John Shanks	4:40
11.	"Siberia"	Martin; Rami; Alexandra Talomaa	Christian Nilsson; Johan Brorson	4:17
12.	"Never Gone"	Kevin Richardson; Gary Baker; Steve Diamond	Mark Taylor	3:45
Total length:				47:41

Tour edition bonus tracks
No.	Title	Writer(s)	Producer(s)	Length
13.	"Song for the Unloved"	Mann; Christopher Rojas	Mann	3:40
14.	"Rush Over Me"	Harvey Mason, Jr.; Damon Thomas; Howie Dorough; AJ McLean; Nick Carter; Kevin Richardson; Brian Littrell	The Underdogs	3:27
15.	"Movin' On"	Dorough; Wade Robson; Nate Butler	David Thomas; Mark Kibble	3:29

Tour edition bonus DVD
No.	Title	Writer(s)	Producer(s)	Length
1.	"Incomplete" (music video)
2.	"Incomplete" (behind the scenes)
3.	"Just Want You to Know" (music video)
4.	"Just Want You to Know" (music video; alternate version)
5.	"Just Want You to Know" (behind the scenes)
6.	"I Still..." (music video)
7.	"I Still..." (behind the scenes)
8.	"Photo Gallery"
9.	"Last Night You Saved My Life"	Billy Mann, Jesse Harris	Mann	3:26

DualDisc DVD side
No.	Title	Length
1.	"Entire album in PCM Stereo and 5.1 Digital Surround Sound"
2.	"Incomplete" (music video)
3.	"Incomplete" (making of)

Notes

- ^{^[a]} signifies a co-producer
- ^{^[a]} signifies an additional producer

== Personnel ==
Credits adapted from album's liner notes.

Backstreet Boys

- Nick Carter – vocals (all tracks), vocal arrangements (tracks 6, 13)
- Howie Dorough – vocals (all tracks), vocal arrangements (tracks 6, 13)
- Brian Littrell – vocals (all tracks), vocal arrangements (tracks 6, 13)
- AJ McLean – vocals (all tracks), vocal arrangements (tracks 6, 13)
- Kevin Richardson – vocals (all tracks), piano (tracks 1, 4, 12), vocal arrangements (6, 13)

Additional personnel

- Alex Acuña – additional percussion (track 9)
- Keith Armstrong – mixing assistant (track 4)
- Rasmus Bahncke – co-producer, keyboards, programming, and arrangements (track 6)
- Tommy Barbarella – keyboards and string arrangements (tracks 3, 7)
- Jerry Barnes – bass (track 4)
- Matt Beckley – assistant engineer (track 3), mixing assistant (track 7)
- Michael Bland – drums (tracks 3, 7)
- Paul Boutin – engineer and editing (track 14)
- Lee Bridges – assistant engineer (track 1)
- Johan Brorson – producer, engineer, guitar, and bass (track 11)
- Adam Brown – string engineer (track 8)
- Paul Buckmaster – string arrangements (track 4)
- Grecco Buratto – guitar (track 9)
- Paul Bushnell – bass (tracks 9, 10)
- Teddy Campbell – drums (track 14)
- Dan Chase – Pro Tools technician (track 2)
- Ken Chastain – percussion and effects (tracks 3, 7)
- Vinnie Colaiuta – drums (tracks 9, 10)
- Tom Coyne – mastering
- John Silas Cranfield – engineer (track 6)
- Dave Dilbeck – engineer (track 1)
- Aaron Fessel – assistant engineer (track 1)
- John Fields – producer, engineer, piano, bass, guitar, keyboards, and effects (tracks 3, 7); mixing (track 3)
- Jon Gass – mixing (track 14)
- Serban Ghenea – mixing (track 2)
- Lukasz "Dr. Luke" Gottwald – producer and engineer (tracks 2, 8), instruments (track 2), guitar and bass (track 8)
- Isobel Griffiths – string contractor (track 12)
- Chris Haggerty – digital editing (tracks 1, 8, 9)
- John Hanes – additional Pro Tools engineering (track 2)
- Dabling "Hobby Boy" Harward – engineer and editing (track 14)
- Brandon Heath – acoustic guitar (track 1)
- Femio Hernandez – mixing assistant (track 7)
- Michael Ilbert – guitar engineer, bass engineer, drum engineer, and Pro Tools editing (track 8); mixing (track 11)
- Lana Israel – production coordinator (tracks 6, 13)
- Corky James – guitar (track 14)
- Mark Kiczula – assistant engineer (track 3), mixing assistant (track 7)
- Mark Kibble – producer (track 15)
- The London Session Orchestra – strings (track 8)
- Chris Lord-Alge – mixing (tracks 1, 4, 5, 8, 9)
- Tom Lord-Alge – mixing (track 7)
- Wil Malone – string arrangement and conducting (track 8)
- Billy Mann – producer, acoustic guitar, electric guitar, arrangements, programming, and vocal arrangements (tracks 6, 13); engineer (track 13)
- Max Martin – producer and engineering (tracks 2, 5, 8), instruments (tracks 2, 5), guitar (track 8)
- Alan Mason – assistant engineer (track 2)
- Skye McCaskey – additional engineering (track 1)
- Chris McMurtry – electric guitar (track 1)
- Steven Miller – engineer (tracks 3, 7), mixing (track 3)
- Brent Milligan – bass (track 1)
- Brian Montgomery – Pro Tools technician (track 4)
- Dan Muckala – producer, engineer, acoustic piano, additional keyboards, and string arrangements (track 1)
- Jamie Muhoberac – keyboards (track 10)
- Pablo Munguia – engineer (track 4), vocal engineer (tracks 9, 12)
- Alex Nifong – electric guitar (track 1)
- Christian Nilsson – engineer (2, 11), Pro Tools technician (track 2), producer and percussion (track 11)
- John Ondrasik – executive producer (track 4)
- Shawn Pelton – drums (tracks 2, 4, 5), percussion (track 2)
- Ross Petersen – assistant Pro Tools engineer (track 4)
- Marc "Fafu" Pfafflin – programming (track 3)
- Adam Phillips – guitar (track 12)
- Randy Poole – mixing (track 15)
- Joe Porter – drums (track 1)
- Steve Price – strings engineer (track 12)
- Brian Pugh – assistant engineer (track 8)
- Ed Quesada – assistant engineer (track 14)
- Rami – producer, engineer, and instruments (track 5)
- Johan Reivén – drums (track 8)
- Tim Roberts – assistant Pro Tools engineer (track 2)
- Chris Rojas – engineer, acoustic guitar, electric guitar, arrangements, keyboard programming, and drum programming (track 13)
- Jeff Rothschild – engineer and mixing (track 10)
- Dave "Natural Love" Russell – engineer and editing (track 14)
- Will Sandalls – engineer (track 13)
- Brian Schueble – engineer (track 4)
- John Shanks – producer, mixing, and guitar (track 10)
- Tony Shepperd – engineer (track 15)
- F. Reid Shippen – additional engineering (track 1)
- Alex Smith – assistant engineer and mixing assistant (track 12)
- Robin Smith – string arrangement and conducting (track 12)
- James Stone – assistant strings engineer (track 12)
- Greg Suran – guitar (tracks 3, 7)
- Shari Sutcliffe – contractor and production coordinator (track 10)
- Ren Swan – engineer and mixing (track 12)
- Kennie Takahashi – mixing assistant (track 3)
- Mark Taylor – producer, engineer, mixing, and string arrangement (track 12)
- Chris Testa – engineer (tracks 3, 7)
- David Thomas – producer (track 15)
- Michael Thompson – guitar (track 14)
- René Tromborg – co-producer, keyboards, programming, arrangements, drums, and percussion (track 6)
- The Underdogs – producers (track 14)
- Mark Valentine – additional engineering (track 10)
- Seth Waldmann – engineer (track 2), assistant Pro Tools engineer (track 4)
- Greg Wattenberg – producer, engineer, guitar, programming, and string arrangements (track 4)
- Paul Wiltshire – producer, engineer, and arranger (track 9)
- Frank Wolf – drum and bass engineer (track 9)
- Gavyn Wright – strings leader (tracks 8, 12)
- Ghian Wright – assistant vocal engineer (track 12), assistant engineer (track 15)
- Victoria Wu – additional production (track 9)
- Andy Zulla – mixing (tracks 6, 13)

== Charts ==
=== Weekly charts ===
Chart (2005)	Peak position
Argentine Albums (CAPIF)	3
Australian Albums (ARIA)	6
Austrian Albums (Ö3 Austria)	4
Belgian Albums (Ultratop Flanders)	13
Belgian Albums (Ultratop Wallonia)	19
Brazilian Albums (ABPD)	7
Canadian Albums (Billboard)	2
Czech Albums (ČNS IFPI)	29
Danish Albums (Hitlisten)	11
Dutch Albums (Album Top 100)	3
European Albums Chart	2
Finnish Albums (Suomen virallinen lista)	5
French Albums (SNEP)	19
German Albums (Offizielle Top 100)	1
Greek Albums (IFPI)	1
Hungarian Albums (MAHASZ)	8
Irish Albums (IRMA)	13
Italian Albums (FIMI)	4
Italian Albums (Musica e Dischi)	5
Japanese Albums (Oricon)	3
Mexican Albums (Top 100 Mexico)	3
New Zealand Albums (RMNZ)	21
Norwegian Albums (VG-lista)	20
Portuguese Albums (AFP)	8
Spanish Albums (Promusicae)	2
Swedish Albums (Sverigetopplistan)	3
Swiss Albums (Schweizer Hitparade)	3
UK Albums (Official Charts)	11
US Billboard 200	3

=== Year-end charts ===
Chart (2005)	Position
Australian Albums (ARIA)	92
Dutch Albums (Album Top 100)	78
European Albums (Billboard)	58
German Albums (Offizielle Top 100)	35
Italian Albums (FIMI)	57
Swedish Albums (Sverigetopplistan)	99
Swiss Albums (Schweizer Hitparade)	22
US Billboard 200	98
Worldwide Albums (IFPI)	25

== Certifications ==
Region	Certification	Certified units/sales
Australia (ARIA)	Platinum	70,000^{‡}
Canada (Music Canada)	Platinum	100,000^{^}
Germany (BVMI)	Gold	100,000^{^}
Ireland (IRMA)	Gold	7,500^{^}
Japan (RIAJ)	2× Platinum	500,000^{^}
Mexico (AMPROFON)	Gold	50,000^{^}
Portugal (AFP)	Gold	10,000^{^}
Russia (NFPF)	Gold	10,000^{*}
Spain (Promusicae)	Gold	50,000^{^}
Switzerland (IFPI Switzerland)	Gold	20,000^{^}
United Kingdom (BPI)	Gold	100,000^{^}
United States (RIAA)	Platinum	1,771,000
^{*} Sales figures based on certification alone.^{^} Shipments figures based on certification alone.^{‡} Sales+streaming figures based on certification alone.
