= This Is Us (Backstreet Boys album) =

Studio album by Backstreet Boys
- Released: September 30, 2009
- Recorded: April 2008 – July 28, 2009
- Studios: Hollywood, Los Angeles (Henson, Conway, Westlake, Chalice); Stockholm, Sweden (Maratone); Los Angeles (Village Recorder, Pulse); Manchester, England (Blueprint)
- Genres: Pop; electropop
- Length: 40:20
- Labels: Jive; Sony Music
- Producers: Printz Board; Antwoine Collins; Troy Johnson; Jim Jonsin; Claude Kelly; Brian Kennedy; Emanuel Kiriakou; Michael Mani; Max Martin; Jordan Omley; Mr. Pyro; RedOne; Shellback; Soulshock & Karlin; T-Pain; Ryan Tedder

Backstreet Boys chronology
Unbreakable (2007)	This Is Us (2009)	Playlist: The Very Best of Backstreet Boys (2010)

Singles from This Is Us
- 1. "Straight Through My Heart" Released: August 17, 2009; 2. "Bigger" Released: November 29, 2009

This Is Us is the seventh studio album (sixth in the United States) by American pop group Backstreet Boys. Serving as a follow-up to Unbreakable (2007), it was released on September 30, 2009, in Japan and in the following days in other territories. For the album, the group reunited with previous collaborator and producer Max Martin, with the intention to create their best record since Millennium (1999). They also worked with Ryan Tedder, Claude Kelly, Jim Jonsin, RedOne, Brian Kennedy, and T-Pain, amongst others, for the album as well.

The album received mixed reviews, with critics praising the Backstreet Boys' vocals, hooks, and modern production, while others criticized its unoriginal material. In the United States, This Is Us debuted at number nine on the Billboard 200, making the group the first since Sade to have their first seven albums reach the top ten, and has sold 98,000 copies. Internationally, it reached the top ten in Japan, Canada, and several European countries, and peaked at number thirty-nine in the UK, where it was later certified silver.

The album's lead single, "Straight Through My Heart," peaked at number three in Japan and was certified platinum, while the second single, "Bigger," charted modestly. To promote the album, Backstreet Boys embarked on the This Is Us Tour, spanning multiple continents. Their final tour as a quartet, This Is Us was their final album on Jive Records and their last of two albums as a quartet before original member Kevin Richardson rejoined the band in 2012.

== Recording and production ==
In an interview with Extra TV, the group confirmed the title of their seventh album to be This Is Us. In the official press release RCA/Jive Records describes the album as "a finely crafted R&B and pop album from four talented musicians who love what they do and who maintain the rare relevance in an industry that often disposes of pop acts. The 11 songs that make up album are the sounds of four skilled singers with a similar vision, who have dealt with the trials and tribulations that accompany fame at an early age and who came out as one of the most successful groups of all time. It shows remarkable growth as songwriters and continues to give us songs that has made millions smile."

On May 1, 2009, the Backstreet Boys management team expressed discontent at the fact that four recorded songs had been leaked on the internet. In an interview, AJ McLean said that the group were "P.O.ed that music had leaked especially since extra care had been taken to keep the record secret". In the end, however, the group used the feedback from the leaks to help guide the direction of the album and even the song selection by comparing fan reviews to what producers thought about the songs. It was later revealed in 2011, that songs recorded for This Is Us were targeted by the German hacker, Deniz A., also known as DJ Stolen. In July 2010, the Rasch law firm logged a criminal complaint against DJ Stolen for "constantly placing hacked songs on the internet". Amongst those songs listed in the complaint was one called "Masquerade", described at the time as a new recording by the Backstreet Boys.

Regarding their collaboration with RedOne, McLean remarked that it had been largely a last minute affair. Due to timing, the group was not able to make any recordings with the in-demand producer; however, near to the album's turn-in date, RedOne revealed that he had worked on three songs for the group and was more than willing to collaborate. It was also revealed that there had previously been 5 or 6 songs in the running for the lead single, although a Kevin Borg production titled "PDA" was most likely to be released; however, the RedOne production felt like "it was meant to be". One Tedder song, "Shadows", which was co-written by McLean was written for this album, but failed to make it, so Simon Cowell bought the song for Leona Lewis's second album Echo but in the end felt it more suited for a boyband and it was featured on Westlife's 10th album Where We Are.

== Promotion ==
=== Singles ===
The first single from This Is Us, "Straight Through My Heart," premiered on Backstreet Boys' official website on August 17, 2009, and was released to radio the following day. The track achieved moderate commercial success, peaking at number three on the Japan Hot 100 and number 18 on the US Hot Dance Club Songs chart. The accompanying music video was filmed in downtown Los Angeles and features the group battling vampire characters against a stylized urban backdrop. "Straight Through My Heart" was certified platinum by the Recording Industry Association of Japan (RIAJ).

The album's second single, "Bigger," was released in the United Kingdom on December 14, 2009, and later impacted adult contemporary radio stations in the United States on February 1, 2010. Written and produced by Max Martin and Shellback, it was issued in multiple formats, including digital download, CD single, and digital EP with remixes and additional tracks. The music video, directed by Frank Borin and filmed in Tokyo during the band's promotional tour, depicts the members exploring the city and performing the song in various urban settings. "Bigger" charted modestly in Japan, where it reached number 69 on the Japan Hot 100, and appeared on airplay charts in select European markets.

=== Tour ===
To support This Is Us, Backstreet Boys launched the This Is Us Tour, their eighth concert tour, visiting Europe, Asia, Australasia, and the Americas. It was the second and final tour performed by the group as a quartet prior to the return of original member Kevin Richardson in 2012. The tour began in Europe in October 2009 and concluded in South America in March 2011. Band members stated that the tour was not intended as a comeback, instead highlighting the group's maturity and longevity. The production featured choreography, background dancers and a set list combining the band's greatest hits with songs from This Is Us. Overall, the tour received generally positive reviews from music critics across the regions visited. Reviewers frequently praised the group's live vocals, high-energy choreography, and hit-driven set list, noting the tour's strong nostalgic appeal. While some critics viewed the performance style as dated or overly theatrical, many acknowledged the band's professionalism and enduring ability to entertain long-time fans. Supporting acts included Ricki-Lee Coulter, J. Williams, Mindless Behavior, Dan Talevski, Shawn Desman, Tino Coury, and Madcon, appearing in various regions and select dates.

== Critical reception ==
Professional ratings
Aggregate scores
Source	Rating
Metacritic	67/100
Review scores
Source	Rating
AllMusic	4/5 stars
Digital Spy	3/5 stars
Entertainment Weekly	B
laut.de	1/5 stars
Los Angeles Times	2/4 stars
Slant Magazine	1.5/5 stars
Toronto Star	2.5/4 stars

This is Us received generally favorable reviews from critics. At Metacritic, which assigns a normalized rating out of 100 to reviews from mainstream critics, the album received an average score of 67, based on 5 reviews. AllMusic's Stephen Thomas Erlewine found the album's hooks more attention-grabbing than Unbreakable and the production more modern than pandering compared to New Kids on the Block's The Block (2008), concluding that "the group sounds great for their age, and they sound like they're at their peak – which is no guarantee of a hit, but it sure makes for a better album than they've produced in quite a while." Mikael Wood of Entertainment Weekly praised the album for bringing back the band's old teen-pop sound with new producers and delivering them with confident vocals. Jason Lipshutz of Billboard admired the band's "foray into throbbing electronica" mixed in with the typical pop fare, concluding that it "may be a stepping stone in ushering [Backstreet Boys] away from their days on pop radio and firmly through the club door."

Nick Levine, writing for Digital Spy, felt thath This Is Us "boasts production from a raft of trendy knob-twiddlers, T-Pain and Ryan Tedder among them, and mostly sounds cool, current and contemporary." August Brown of the Los Angeles Times gave credit to the band for continuing to deliver catchy tracks but ultimately called the album "a competent but very late-adopted pop-trance slurry." John Terauds of the Toronto Star noted that the tracks have an '80s influence to them but said that "nothing sounds truly original." He also added that it will appeal only to diehard fans of the band. Jonathan Keefe of Slant Magazine criticized the album's producers for crafting songs that range from retreads of other songs ("Straight Through My Heart", "If I Knew Then" and "Undone") to "flat-out embarrassing" ("She's a Dream" and "P.D.A."), concluding that, "No matter how strong their voices might remain and no matter how sincere they may be about keeping their career going, Backstreet Boys' collaborators have failed them here." Writing for laut.de Matthias Manthe described This Is Us as "pale musical soullessness," and added:" The overall package lacks so much esprit that even the label may soon realize it's time to bring this self-plagiarism to an end."

== Commercial performance ==
In the United States, This Is Us debuted and peaked at number nine on the Billboard 200 in the week of October 24, 2009, with first-week sales of 42,000 copies. The achievement made Backstreet Boys the first group since Sade to have their first seven charting albums reach the top ten of the chart. In its second week, sales fell by 79.8 percent to 8,000 units, causing the album to drop to number sixty-four on the Billboard 200. The album remained on the chart for a total of five weeks. As of June 2011, the album had sold 98,000 copies in the United States, according to Nielsen SoundScan.

Internationally, the album experienced moderate commercial success. In Japan, it peaked at number two on the Oricon Albums Chart and reached number three on the Canadian Albums Chart. The album also entered the top ten in several European countries, peaking at number five in the Netherlands and Spain, number nine in Switzerland, and number ten in Germany. In Brazil, This Is Us peaked at number nine on the national albums chart. In the United Kingdom, the album debuted at number thirty-nine on the UK Albums Chart during the week of October 17, 2009, and remained on the chart for one week. On 12 January 2024, it was certified silver by the British Phonographic Industry (BPI).

== Track listing ==
Standard edition
No.	Title	Writer(s)	Producer(s)	Length
1.	"Straight Through My Heart"	Nadir Khayat; Bilal Hajji; Novel Jannusi; AJ Jannusi; Kinnda Hamid	RedOne	3:27
2.	"Bigger"	Max Martin; Karl Johan Schuster; Tiffany Amber	Martin; Shellback	3:15
3.	"Bye Bye Love"	Carsten Schack; Kenneth Karlin; Claude Kelly	Soulshock & Karlin	4:20
4.	"All of Your Life (You Need Love)"	Charles Hinshaw, Jr.	RedOne	3:55
5.	"If I Knew Then"	Schack; Karlin; Kelly	Soulshock & Karlin	3:16
6.	"This Is Us"	Jordan Omley; Michael Mani; James Scheffer; Frank Romano; Howie Dorough	Jim Jonsin; Omley; Mani	3:03
7.	"PDA"	Priese Board; Mario "Tex" James	Printz Board	3:48
8.	"Masquerade"	Michael Busbee; Brian Kennedy; Alex James; Antwoine Collins	Kennedy; Collins	3:03
9.	"She's a Dream"	Nick Carter; Faheem Najm; Dorough; Brian Littrell; AJ McLean; Daen Simmons	T-Pain; Mr. Pyro	3:58
10.	"Shattered"	Jordan "infinity" Suecof; Tiyon "TC" Mack; Chad "C-Note" Roper; Darhyl Camper	Emanuel Kiriakou	3:53
11.	"Undone"	Troy Johnson; Ryan Tedder; Josh Hoge	Johnson; Tedder	4:14

UK bonus track
No.	Title	Writer(s)	Producer(s)	Length
12.	"Helpless" (featuring Pitbull)	Omley; Scheffer; Romano; Mani; Armando Perez	Jonsin	3:31

Japanese edition bonus tracks
No.	Title	Writer(s)	Producer(s)	Length
12.	"International Luv"	Carter; Najm; Dorough; Littrell; McLean	T-Pain	3:17
13.	"Straight Through My Heart" (Jason Nevins Mixshow Remix)			5:35

Tour edition bonus tracks
No.	Title	Writer(s)	Producer(s)	Length
12.	"International Luv"	Carter; Najm; Dorough; Littrell; McLean	T-Pain	3:17
13.	"Helpless" (featuring Pitbull)	Omley; Scheffer; Romano; Mani; Perez	Jonsin	3:31
14.	"On Without You"	David Siegel; Scheffer; Omley; Mani	Jonsin	3:37
15.	"Straight Through My Heart" (Jason Nevins Mixshow Remix)			5:35

Deluxe edition bonus DVD: Backstreet Boys - Live at the O2
No.	Title	Notes	Length
1.	"I Want It That Way"	Live
2.	"Inconsolable"	Live
3.	"The One"	Live
4.	"The Call"	Live
5.	"Everybody (Backstreet's Back)"	Live
6.	"Shape of My Heart"	Live
7.	"Straight Through My Heart"	Music video

Tour edition bonus DVD
No.	Title	Notes	Length
1.	"Straight Through My Heart"	Music video
2.	"Straight Through My Heart"	Making of the video
3.	"Bigger"	Music video
4.	"Behind the Scenes in Tokyo 2009"	Documentary

== Personnel ==
Credits adapted from album's liner notes.

Backstreet Boys

- Nick Carter
- Howie Dorough
- Brian Littrell
- AJ McLean

Additional personnel

- Nathaniel Alford – assistant engineer (track 7)
- Printz Board – producer, arranger, and instruments (track 7)
- Al Clay – engineer (track 2)
- Antwoine "T-Wiz" Collins – co-producer and additional programming (track 8)
- Martin Cooke – engineer (track 1)
- Tom Coyne – mastering
- Michael Daley – mixing assistant (track 8)
- Craig Durrance – engineer (track 7)
- Chris Galland – assistant engineer (track 2)
- Serban Ghenea – mixing (tracks 2, 3, 5)
- John Hanes – additional Pro Tools engineering (tracks 2, 3, 5)
- Ghazi Hourani – mixing assistant (track 9)
- Novel Janussi – instruments (track 1)
- Troy "Radio" Johnson – producer, vocal producer, engineer, and instruments (track 11)
- Jim Jonsin – producer, keyboards, and drum programming (track 6)
- Jaycen Joshua – mixing (tracks 7, 10)
- Kenneth Karlin – producer, arranger, and instruments (tracks 3, 5)
- Claude Kelly – additional vocal production and backing vocals (tracks 3, 5)
- Brian Kennedy – producer and instruments (track 8)
- Emanuel Kiriakou – producer, instruments, and programming (track 10)
- Kristian Lundin – additional vocal production (track 8)
- Bill Malina – engineer (tracks 3, 5)
- Mike Mani – producer and additional keyboards (track 6), vocal producer (track 11)
- Fabian Marasciullo – mixing (track 9)
- Rob Marks – engineer and mixing (track 6)
- Max Martin – producer, engineer, and keyboards (track 2)
- AJ Nunez – mixing assistant (track 7)
- Jordan Omley – producer (track 6), vocal producer (track 11)
- Robert Orton – mixing (tracks 1, 4)
- Brent Paschke – engineer (track 10)
- David Pensado – mixing (tracks 7, 11)
- Mr. Pyro – producer (track 9)
- RedOne – producer, engineer, instruments, programming, vocal arrangements, and vocal editing (tracks 1, 4)
- Eric Rennaker – assistant engineer (track 6)
- Tim Roberts – assistant Pro Tools engineer (tracks 2, 3, 5)
- Frank Romano – guitar (track 6)
- Dave Russel – mixing (track 8)
- Johnny Severin – vocal editing (tracks 1, 4)
- Shellback – engineer, guitar, bass, and drums (track 2)
- Soulshock – producer, arranger, and instruments (tracks 3, 5)
- T-Pain – producer (track 9)
- Sean Tallman – engineer (track 8)
- Ryan Tedder – co-producer (track 11)
- Pat Thrall – editing (track 10)
- Javier Valverde – engineer (track 9)
- Jason Wilkie – assistant engineer (track 6)
- Andrew Wuepper – mixing assistant (track 7)

== Charts ==
Chart (2009)	Peak position
Australian Albums (ARIA)	35
Austrian Albums (Ö3 Austria)	47
Belgian Albums (Ultratop Flanders)	27
Belgian Albums (Ultratop Wallonia)	47
Brazilian Albums (ABPD)	9
Canadian Albums (Billboard)	3
Danish Albums (Hitlisten)	31
Dutch Albums (Album Top 100)	5
European Top 100 Albums ('Billboard)	11
Finnish Albums (Suomen virallinen lista)	24
German Albums (Offizielle Top 100)	10
Irish Albums (IRMA)	24
Italian Albums (FIMI)	21
Italian Albums (Musica e Dischi)	28
Japanese Albums (Oricon)	2
Mexican Albums (Top 100 Mexico)	12
Portuguese Albums (AFP)	17
Scottish Albums (OCC)	48
Spanish Albums (Promusicae)	5
Swedish Albums (Sverigetopplistan)	17
Swiss Albums (Schweizer Hitparade)	9
Taiwanese Albums (G-Music)	1
UK Albums (Official Charts)	39
US Billboard 200	9

== Certifications and sales ==
Region	Certification	Certified units/sales
Japan (RIAJ)	Platinum	250,000^{^}
United Kingdom (BPI)	Silver	60,000^{‡}
United States	—	98,000
^{^} Shipments figures based on certification alone.^{‡} Sales+streaming figures based on certification alone.

== Release history ==
This Is Us release history
Region	Format	Date	Label	Catalog	Ref(s)
Japan	Standard edition	September 30, 2009	Sony Music Japan	BVCP40100	
Japan	Deluxe edition	September 30, 2009	Sony Music Japan	BVCP40098	
United Kingdom	Standard edition	October 5, 2009	RCA Records	88697596182	
United Kingdom	Deluxe edition	October 5, 2009	RCA Records	88697580882	
United States	Standard edition	October 6, 2009	Jive Records	886975650422	
United States	Deluxe edition	October 6, 2009	Jive Records		
Canada	Standard edition	October 6, 2009	Sony Music Entertainment	88697565042	
Canada	Deluxe edition	October 6, 2009	Sony Music Entertainment	88697580882	
Taiwan	Deluxe edition	October 9, 2009	Sony Music Entertainment	88697580882	
Brazil	Standard edition	October 15, 2009	Sony Music Entertainment	886975961825	
