= I Still... =

2006 single by Backstreet Boys

Single by Backstreet Boys

from the album Never Gone
- Released: November 25, 2005
- Studio: Maratone (Stockholm, Sweden)
- Length: 3:46
- Label: Jive
- Songwriters: Max Martin, Rami Yacoub
- Producers: Max Martin, Rami

Backstreet Boys singles chronology
"Crawling Back to You" (2005)	"I Still..." (2005)	"Inconsolable" (2007)

Music video
- "I Still..." on YouTube

"I Still..." is a song from American vocal group Backstreet Boys' fifth studio album, Never Gone (2005). It was released as the third and final single from the album outside the United States on November 25, 2005. The single reached the top 40 in Australia, Greece, and Sweden. This was the last single the band released with Kevin Richardson until he permanently returned to the band in 2012.

== Music video ==
The music video depicts the group in a dark urban setting. Each member is filmed in their setting: Kevin Richardson in a bar, Howie Dorough in a cab, Nick Carter at a bus stop, Brian Littrell on the street, and AJ McLean in an alley. The video was directed by Matt McDermitt, whom The Boston Globe reported to be only 19 years old at the time of filming. The music video is noted for using slow-motion technique. There are two versions of the music video for the song: the second is the rough cut.

== Track listings ==
- European CD single
1. "I Still..." (album version) – 3:49
2. "Just Want You to Know" (Jason Nevins remix radio edit) – 3:43
- Australian CD single
1. "I Still..." (album version) – 3:49
2. "I Still..." (Passengerz remix) – 3:17
3. "Just Want You to Know" (Jason Nevins extended mix) – 6:30
4. "I Still..." (video enhancement)
- Japanese CD single
1. "I Still..." (album version)
2. "I Still..." (Passengerz remix)
3. "Show Me the Meaning of Being Lonely" (live)
4. "Larger than Life" (live)
5. "Just Want You to Know" (Jason Nevins remix radio edit)
6. "Just Want You to Know" (video enhancement)
7. "I Still..." (video enhancement)

== Charts ==
Chart (2006)	Peak position
Australia (ARIA)	16
Austria (Ö3 Austria Top 40)	47
Belgium (Ultratip Bubbling Under Flanders)	16
Germany (GfK)	45
Greece (IFPI)	27
Hungary (Editors' Choice Top 40)	25
Latvia (Latvijas Top 50)	41
Netherlands (Dutch Top 40 Tipparade)	8
Netherlands (Single Top 100)	78
Sweden (Sverigetopplistan)	35
Switzerland (Schweizer Hitparade)	56
Switzerland Airplay (Swiss Hitparade)	26

== Release history ==
Region	Date	Format(s)	Label(s)	Ref.
Europe	November 25, 2005	CD	Jive	
Japan	December 21, 2005	CD	Jive	
Australia	January 30, 2006	CD	Jive	
