= Straight Through My Heart =

Single by Backstreet Boys

from the album This Is Us
- Released: August 27, 2009
- Recorded: June 2009
- Studio: Henson, Hollywood, California
- Genre: Pop
- Length: 3:28
- Label: Jive
- Songwriters: AJ Jannusi, Kinnda Hamid, Bilal Hajji, Novel Jannusi, Nadir Khayat
- Producers: RedOne, Beatgeek

Backstreet Boys singles chronology
| "Helpless When She Smiles" (2008) | "Straight Through My Heart" (2009) | "Bigger" (2009) |

Music video
- "Straight Through My Heart" on YouTube

"Straight Through My Heart" is a song performed by American pop band Backstreet Boys. It was released as the lead single from their seventh studio album, This is Us. On July 23, 2009 the single received its world premier on the group's official website, since then it was sent to radio on July 28, 2009, before its digital release on August 19, 2009. It was later released as a CD single at the end of September 2009. "Straight Through My Heart" was certified Platinum by the Recording Industry Association of Japan in 2014.

== Critical reception ==
Alex Fletcher of Digital Spy said "Fortunately, though the glitz and glamour may have faded somewhat, musically they appear to be undergoing a renaissance. If this RedOne-produced single is a fair representation, then their upcoming album may live up its billing as the band's best since 1999's Millennium. Fans who always preferred their banging pop tracks to the syrupy ballads will certainly be satisfied with this throbbing anthem, which has a chorus just begging for some old-school BSB dance moves." (3/5 stars) This Must Be Pop listed the song in their top 5 most underrated RedOne productions. The Song won "International Song of the Year" at the Japan Gold Disc Awards.

== Music video ==
The video for "Straight Through My Heart" was filmed on August 7 and 8 of 2009 in downtown Los Angeles, California. It was directed by Kai Regan. It was released on August 27 over the internet. The introduction says, "Day Walkers: A group who band together to protect innocent mortals or Kine against the Gentry: Vampires who hunt for prey at bars and nightclubs. Sometimes these hunters become, The hunted.." After the introduction the song starts playing. A female vampire rides a motorcycle up to a nightclub and walks inside. The Backstreet Boys are performing inside the club. The vampire begins to hunt for victims as the Backstreet Boys start to sing. Just before the climax of the song, Nick Carter notices that the vampire has a victim. At the climax, water, presumably holy water, pours down from the ceiling onto the crowd. This scares the vampire and Carter reaches out to her. He leads the vampire, with Brian Littrell, AJ McLean, and Howie Dorough behind them, into another room. They lock the doors and open another one, throwing the vampire outside into the sunlight, destroying her. After destroying the vampire, the group walks out into the sun, revealing their enlarged teeth and red eyes. It was used as a cheering song for Son Ah-seop, who played for the Lotte Giants.

== Track listings ==
- CD Single
1. "Straight Through My Heart" (Main Version) — 3:28
2. "Straight Through My Heart" (Instrumental) — 3:28
- UK CD Single
1. "Straight Through My Heart" (Main Version) — 3:28
2. "Straight Through My Heart" (Dave Audé Radio Edit) — 3:53

== Charts ==
| Chart (2009) | Peak position |
|---|---|
| Australia (ARIA) | 54 |
| Austria (Ö3 Austria Top 40) | 45 |
| Belgium (Ultratip Bubbling Under Flanders) | 18 |
| Canada (Canadian Hot 100) | 19 |
| Europe (Eurochart Hot 100) | 53 |
| Germany (GfK) | 22 |
| Italy (FIMI) | 37 |
| Italy (Musica e dischi) | 37 |
| Japan (Japan Hot 100) | 3 |
| Latvia (Latvijas Top 50) | 14 |
| Mexico Ingles Airplay (Billboard) | 4 |
| South Korea (Gaon Charts) | 4 |
| Scottish Singles Sales (Official Charts) | 5 |
| Sweden (Sverigetopplistan) | 10 |
| Switzerland (Schweizer Hitparade) | 30 |
| Switzerland Airplay (Swiss Hitparade) | 29 |
| UK Singles (OCC) | 72 |
| US Billboard Bubbling Under Hot 100 | 6 |
| US Billboard Hot Dance Club Songs | 18 |

=== Year-end charts ===
| Chart (2009) | Position |
|---|---|
| Japan (Billboard Japan Hot 100) | 19 |
| Japan Adult Contemporary (Billboard) | 11 |
| Taiwan (Hito Radio) | 99 |

== Certifications ==
| Region | Certification | Certified units/sales |
|---|---|---|
| Japan (RIAJ) | Platinum | 250,000^{*} |
^{*} Sales figures based on certification alone.

== Release history ==
| Region | Date | Format | Label | Ref. |
|---|---|---|---|---|
| Russia | August 17, 2009 | Contemporary hit radio | Sony | |
