= Inconsolable =

2007 single by Backstreet Boys

Single by Backstreet Boys

from the album Unbreakable
- Released: August 27, 2007
- Genre: Pop
- Length: 3:36
- Label: Jive
- Songwriters: Emanuel Kiriakou, Lindy Robbins, Jess Cates
- Producer: Emanuel Kiriakou

Backstreet Boys singles chronology
"I Still..." (2005)	"Inconsolable" (2007)	"Helpless When She Smiles" (2007)

Music video
- "Inconsolable" on YouTube

"Inconsolable" is a song by American boy band Backstreet Boys. The song was released as the first single from their sixth studio album Unbreakable (2007). It is the group's first single without Kevin Richardson, who had left the group in 2006. The single was released to US radio outlets on August 27, 2007. It was first confirmed on July 25, 2007, and premiered by Jive at Z-100 - New York's Hit Music Station on August 6. The song entered the top 10 in Italy and Switzerland, reaching numbers two and eight, respectively.

== Background and composition ==
"Inconsolable" was written by Emmanuel Kiriakou, Lindy Robbins and Jess Cates and produced by Emanuel Kiriakou. It features the trademark emotional boy band romantic lyrics with heartfelt vocals.

The song is a piano-driven power ballad similar to "Incomplete". It features acoustic piano, strings, rhythmic acoustic guitars, heavy vocal harmonies and an emotional vocal performance. The song's verses are in the key of G major, whilst the chorus is in the relative key of E minor.

== Critical reception ==
The song was well received by critics. Bill Lamb of About.com wrote: "It only takes one cut like the first single 'Inconsolable' to realize the group is concentrating on fleshing out their most comfortable pop territory." Andy Battaglia of The A.V. Club commented that the song "reach the stirring heights of old while maintaining Backstreet Boys' habit of mimicking, melodically and structurally, songs by Def Leppard." Gemma Padley of BBC Music wrote that the song "features the trademark emotional wrangling but thankfully resists boy band cliches like the diabolical key change." Simon Vozick-Levinson from Entertainment Weekly called it a "soggy adult-contemporary power ballad", while Matt O'Leary from Virgin Media named it "a textbook Backstreet Boys song, a huge, glossy, shiny thing, with very heartfelt vocals." Yahoo! Music wrote: "It is an extremely catchy pop song, a perfect track to reintroduce the group to the marketplace."

== Music video ==
The music video, directed by Ray Kay, was shot in Venice Beach, California on August 16, 2007. The music video features the group both individually and together. In the beginning, Nick Carter is shown lying on the beach during a solar eclipse, Brian Littrell is in a house looking out, AJ McLean is on the street with a car, much like in "Incomplete", and Howie Dorough is shown sitting with his back against a wall near the beach. At various intervals in between, when the chorus is sung, the four are seen together on the Venice Pier. After the leads are sung, the scenes shift between the group individually and together; at the end of the video, the eclipse ends. The city wakes up and they walk towards the ocean together on the pier.

== Track listings ==
UK CD1

1. "Inconsolable" – 3:36
2. "Close My Eyes" – 4:06

UK CD2

1. "Inconsolable" (album version) – 3:36
2. "Inconsolable" (Jason Nevins remix) – 4:14
3. "Inconsolable" (Soul Seekerz remix) – 5:49
4. "Inconsolable" (Eazy remix) – 6:08
5. "Inconsolable" (video enhancement) – 3:43

Australian and Japanese CD single

1. "Inconsolable" (main version) – 3:36
2. "Inconsolable" (instrumental) – 3:36

== Charts ==
=== Weekly charts ===
Chart (2007)	Peak position
Australia (ARIA)	43
Austria (Ö3 Austria Top 40)	31
Belgium (Ultratip Bubbling Under Flanders)	6
Belgium (Ultratip Bubbling Under Wallonia)	9
Canada Hot 100 (Billboard)	68
Canada AC (Billboard)	23
CIS Airplay (TopHit)	24
European Hot 100 Singles (Billboard)	21
Finland Airplay (Radiosoittolista)	5
Germany (GfK)	17
Ireland (IRMA)	36
Italy (FIMI)	2
Italy (Musica e dischi)	6
Japan (Oricon)	29
Netherlands (Dutch Top 40 Tipparade)	5
Netherlands (Single Top 100)	38
Romania (Romanian Top 100)	93
Russia Airplay (TopHit)	23
Scottish Singles Sales (Official Charts)	24
Slovakia Airplay (ČNS IFPI)	23
Sweden (Sverigetopplistan)	22
Switzerland (Schweizer Hitparade)	8
Switzerland Airplay (Swiss Hitparade)	10
UK Singles (Official Charts)	24
US Billboard Hot 100	86
US Adult Contemporary (Billboard)	21
US Adult Pop Airplay (Billboard)	37
US Pop Airplay (Billboard)	34

=== Year-end charts ===
Chart (2007)	Position
Brazil (Crowley)	87
CIS (TopHit)	78
Italy (FIMI)	45
Russia Airplay (TopHit)	105
Taiwan (Hito Radio)	24
Chart (2008)	Position
Taiwan (Hito Radio)	90

== Certifications ==
Region	Certification	Certified units/sales
Brazil (Pro-Música Brasil)	Gold	30,000^{‡}
Japan (RIAJ) Full-length ringtone	Gold	100,000^{*}
^{*} Sales figures based on certification alone.^{‡} Sales+streaming figures based on certification alone.

== Release history ==
Region	Date	Format	Label	Ref.
United States	August 27, 2007	Contemporary hit radio	Jive	
Australia	September 24, 2007	CD	Jive	
Japan	September 26, 2007	CD	Jive	
United Kingdom	October 22, 2007	CD	Jive	
