= Bigger (Backstreet Boys song) =

Single by Backstreet Boys

from the album This Is Us
- Released: November 29, 2009
- Recorded: January–February 2009
- Studio: Maratone Studios (Stockholm); Conway Recording Studios (Los Angeles)
- Genre: Pop, dance-pop
- Length: 3:15
- Label: Jive
- Songwriters: Max Martin, Shellback, Tiffany Amber
- Producer: Max Martin

Backstreet Boys singles chronology
"Straight Through My Heart" (2009)	"Bigger" (2009)	"Don't Turn Out the Lights" (2011)

Music video
- "Bigger" on YouTube

"Bigger" is a song by American boy band Backstreet Boys. It was released on November 29, 2009, as the second single from their seventh studio album, This Is Us (2009). The song was co-written and produced by collaborator and producer Max Martin. The band stated that the song was one of their best cuts since "I Want It That Way", a song written and produced by Martin for the band in 1998. This was also the last standard Backstreet Boys single to be released as a quartet before Kevin Richardson returned to the group in 2012.

== Background and composition ==
"Bigger" was written by Max Martin, Johan Schuster and Tiffany Amber, while produced by Martin and Shellback. It was recorded by Al Clay at Conway Studios in Los Angeles, California, and by Martin and Shellback at Maratone Studios in Stockholm, Sweden. It was mixed at Mixstar Studios by Serban Ghenea. Audio engineering was done by John Hanes, while assisted by Tim Roberts. Shellback played the guitar, bass guitar and drums, and Martin played the keyboards. When asked about the track, AJ McLean said:

"We met with him while we were touring the last record just to see if he was even interested. Obviously he's busy with Pink and Kelly Clarkson and people like that. He sent us a track called 'Bigger' and we loved it - it's like the new 'I Want It That Way'. He's one of the reasons why we've had the hits that we've had."

== Music video ==
The music video was directed by Frank Borin, was filmed in Tokyo, Japan. During a mini-tour there to promote their album This Is Us. It premiered worldwide at the official Backstreet Boys website.

== Track listing ==
- Digital download
1. "Bigger" - 3:15
- iTunes Single
1. "Bigger" — 3:15
2. "Straight Through My Heart" (Dave Aude Club) — 6:39
- iTunes Digital EP
1. "Bigger" — 3:15
2. "Straight Through My Heart" (Jason Nevins Mixshow Remix) — 5:35
3. "On Without You" — 3:36
4. "Bigger" (Video) — 3:22
- CD single
1. "Bigger" — 3:17
2. "Bigger (Instrumental)" — 3:16

== Charts ==
Chart (2009)	Peak position
Japan (Japan Hot 100)	69
Slovakia Airplay (ČNS IFPI)	56
Switzerland Airplay (Swiss Hitparade)	82
