= Just Want You to Know =

2005 single by Backstreet Boys

Single by Backstreet Boys

from the album Never Gone
- B-side: "Larger than Life" (live)
- Released: July 18, 2005
- Studio: Maratone (Stockholm, Sweden); Conway (Hollywood, California)
- Genre: Pop rock
- Length: 3:53
- Label: Jive
- Songwriters: Max Martin; Lukasz Gottwald
- Producers: Max Martin; Dr. Luke

Backstreet Boys singles chronology
"Incomplete" (2005)	"Just Want You to Know" (2005)	"Crawling Back to You" (2005)

Music video
- "Just Want You to Know" on YouTube

"Just Want You to Know" is a song performed by American vocal group Backstreet Boys, released on July 18, 2005 as the second single from the group's fifth studio album, Never Gone (2005). The single performed well in European countries, reaching the top 10 in the United Kingdom and Spain and peaking within the top 20 in Germany, Ireland, and Italy.

== Music video ==
The music video for "Just Want You to Know" pays homage to the 1986 documentary Heavy Metal Parking Lot; set on May 13, 1985, it features the Backstreet Boys both as fans of the fictional heavy metal band "Sphynkter" and as the Sphynkter band members themselves in concert footage. There are two versions of the video, both directed by Marc Klasfeld and released worldwide on September 3, 2005. The second version, which has the Backstreet Boys performing solely as Sphynkter throughout the video, was a special reward exclusively leaked online.

== Track listings ==
UK CD1 and European CD single

1. "Just Want You to Know"
2. "Larger than Life" (live)

UK CD2 and Australian CD single

1. "Just Want You to Know"
2. "I Want It That Way" (live)
3. "Show Me the Meaning of Being Lonely" (live)

UK DVD single

1. "Just Want You to Know" (video)
2. "Weird World" (a performance taken from AOL Live)

European maxi-CD single

1. "Just Want You to Know" – 3:51
2. "Show Me the Meaning of Being Lonely" (live) – 4:44
3. "Larger than Life" (live) – 3:57
4. "I Want It That Way" (live) – 4:15
5. "Just Want You to Know" (video enhancement)
6. Screensaver enhancement

Japanese CD single

1. "Just Want You to Know" (album version)
2. "Just Want You to Know" (instrumental version)
3. "I Want It That Way" (live)

== Credits and personnel ==
- Drums, Percussion – Shawn Pelton
- Engineer [Additional Pro Tools] – John Hanes
- Engineer [Assistant Additional Pro Tools] – Tim Roberts
- Engineer [Pro Tools Techs] – Christian Nilsson, Dan Chase
- Mixed by – Serban Ghenea
- Producer – Max Martin and Lukasz "Dr. Luke" Gottwald
- Recorded by – Christian Nilsson, Lukasz "Dr. Luke" Gottwald, Seth Waldmann
- Recorded by [Assistant] – Alan Mason
- Recorded at Maratone Studios (Stockholm, Sweden) and Conway Studios (Hollywood, California)
- Written By – Max Martin, Lukasz Gottwald

== Charts ==
=== Weekly charts ===
Chart (2005)	Peak position
Australia (ARIA)	22
Austria (Ö3 Austria Top 40)	22
Belgium (Ultratip Bubbling Under Flanders)	3
Belgium (Ultratip Bubbling Under Wallonia)	2
Canada CHR/Pop Top 30 (Radio & Records)	22
CIS Airplay (TopHit)	86
Europe (Eurochart Hot 100)	19
Finland Airplay (Radiosoittolista)	20
Germany (GfK)	20
Hungary (Rádiós Top 40)	26
Ireland (IRMA)	15
Italy (FIMI)	18
Italy (Musica e dischi)	17
Netherlands (Dutch Top 40)	35
Netherlands (Single Top 100)	27
Russia Airplay (TopHit)	81
Scottish Singles Sales (Official Charts)	13
Spain (Promusicae)	7
Sweden (Sverigetopplistan)	28
Switzerland (Schweizer Hitparade)	29
UK Singles (Official Charts)	8
Ukraine Airplay (TopHit)	152
US Billboard Hot 100	70
US Adult Contemporary (Billboard)	35
US Pop 100 (Billboard)	33
US Pop Airplay (Billboard)	21

=== Year-end charts ===
Chart (2005)	Position
US Mainstream Top 40 (Billboard)	96

== Release history ==
Region	Date	Format	Label	Ref.
United States	July 18, 2005	Contemporary hit radio	Jive	
United States	August 15, 2005	Hot adult contemporary radio	Jive	
Japan	August 24, 2005	CD	Jive	
Denmark	September 12, 2005	CD	Jive	
Australia	September 19, 2005	CD	Jive	
United Kingdom	October 24, 2005	CD	Jive	
