= Helpless When She Smiles =

2007 single by Backstreet Boys

Single by Backstreet Boys

from the album Unbreakable
- Released: December 26, 2007
- Studio: Henson (Hollywood)
- Length: 4:04
- Label: Jive
- Songwriters: Brett James, Chris Lindsey, Aimee Mayo, Troy Verges
- Producer: John Shanks

Backstreet Boys singles chronology
"Inconsolable" (2007)	"Helpless When She Smiles" (2007)	"Straight Through My Heart" (2009)

Music video
- "Helpless When She Smiles" on YouTube

"Helpless When She Smiles" is the second single from American vocal group Backstreet Boys' sixth (fifth in the US) studio album, Unbreakable, which was released on October 30, 2007. The single, produced by John Shanks, was released on December 26, 2007. This song was leaked on the Internet back in May 2007 along with "Happily Never After" which never made the album.

The song was originally written in 2004 for Rascal Flatts, and first recorded by Dutch singer Bastiaan Ragas in 2005, then by German singer Mike Leon Grosch in 2006 before it was recorded by the Backstreet Boys.

== Music video ==
The video for "Helpless When She Smiles" was in Joshua Tree National Park, California on November 13, 2007. It is directed by Bernard Gourley. The music video premiered on December 12 on Yahoo! Music. The video was filmed in color, but then stripped to appear black and white, depicting the group standing in a spacious corn field. It features helicopter shots, akin to previous Backstreet Boys video "More than That". The video peaked at #1 on Much More Music's Top 10 Countdown.

== Track listing ==
UK CD1

1. "Helpless When She Smiles" (album version) – 4:04
2. "Helpless When She Smiles" (radio mix) – 4:04
3. "Trouble Is" – 3:33

UK CD2

1. "Helpless When She Smiles" (album version) – 4:04
2. "Helpless When She Smiles" (radio mix) – 4:04
3. "There's Us" – 4:10
4. "Trouble Is" – 3:33
5. "Nowhere to Go" – 2:48
6. "Satellite" – 3:28

Digital download

1. "Helpless When She Smiles" (radio mix) – 4:04
2. "Helpless When She Smiles" (rock remix) – 4:02
3. "Helpless When She Smiles" (Jason Nevins dub remix) – 7:09
4. "Helpless When She Smiles" (Jason Nevins radio mix) – 4:24
5. "Helpless When She Smiles" (Jason Nevins extended remix) – 7:38
6. "Helpless When She Smiles" (Jason Nevins underground club remix) – 7:23

== Charts ==
Chart (2008)	Peak position
Germany (GfK)	34
Italy (Musica e dischi)	4
Netherlands (Dutch Top 40 Tipparade)	7
Netherlands (Single Top 100)	83
Romania (Romanian Top 100)	70
Switzerland Airplay (Swiss Hitparade)	9

== Release history ==
Region	Date	Format	Label	Ref.
Russia	December 26, 2007	Contemporary hit radio	Sony BMG	
Europe	January 11, 2008	CD	Jive	
United States	January 15, 2008	Mainstream airplay	Jive	
