= Incomplete (Backstreet Boys song) =

2005 single by Backstreet Boys

Single by Backstreet Boys

from the album Never Gone
- B-side: "My Beautiful Woman"; "Movin' On"
- Released: April 11, 2005
- Studio: Westlake Recording (Hollywood, California)
- Length: 3:59
- Label: Jive
- Songwriters: Dan Muckala; Lindy Robbins; Jess Cates
- Producer: Dan Muckala

Backstreet Boys singles chronology
| "Drowning" (2001) | "Incomplete" (2005) | "Just Want You to Know" (2005) |

Music video
- "Incomplete" on YouTube

"Incomplete" is a song by American vocal group Backstreet Boys from their fifth studio album, Never Gone (2005). The power ballad was released on April 11, 2005, as the group's first single since they decided to reunite after a two-year hiatus. It was written by Dan Muckala, Lindy Robbins, and Jess Cates, and it was produced by Muckala with Kevin Richardson on piano. According to Billboard magazine's Chuck Taylor, the song is an "emotion-packed, grown-up tome about relationship struggle and strife."

"Incomplete" marked a stylistic change for the band, with member AJ McLean saying that the band wanted to break away from the image they had attained during the 1990s and early 2000s. The song was a commercial success, peaking at number 13 on the US Billboard Hot 100 and earning a gold certification for selling over half a million copies in the US. It also reached the top 10 in several European countries. In Australia, it debuted at number one, giving the group their only number-one hit there, and received a double-platinum sales certification.

== Critical reception ==
Chuck Taylor from Billboard magazine compared the Backstreet Boys' vocals to those of Bryan Adams and Blessid Union of Souls, going on to say that the song would be refreshing to hear on the radio "like crisp white sheets." British columnist James Masterton wrote that "Incomplete" proved that the band had not lost their talent following their hiatus, going on to call the track's production "bombastic."

== Music video ==
The official music video for "Incomplete" was directed by Joseph Kahn.

== Track listings ==
UK CD1

1. "Incomplete" – 3:59
2. "Incomplete" (instrumental) – 3:59

UK CD2; European and Australian maxi-CD single

1. "Incomplete" – 3:59
2. "My Beautiful Woman" (Paul Wiltshire, Victoria Wu) – 3:36
3. "Movin' On" (Howie Dorough, Wade Robson, Nate Butler) – 3:30
4. "Incomplete" (video)

European CD single

1. "Incomplete" – 3:59
2. "Movin' On" – 3:30

Japanese CD single

1. "Incomplete" (album version) – 3:59
2. "Incomplete" (instrumental) – 3:59
3. "My Beautiful Woman" (album version) (Wiltshire, Wu) – 3:36
4. "My Beautiful Woman" (instrumental) (Wiltshire, Wu) – 3:36

== Personnel ==
Personnel are lifted from the Never Gone liner notes.

- Dan Muckala – writing, additional keyboards, string arrangement, production, recording
- Lindy Robbins – writing
- Jess Cates – writing
- Brandon Heath – acoustic guitar
- Alex Nifong – electric guitar
- Chris McMurtry – electric guitar
- Brent Milligan – bass guitar
- Kevin Richardson – piano
- Joe Porter – drums
- David Dillbeck – recording
- F. Reid Shippen – additional engineering
- Skye McCaskey – additional engineering
- Lee Bridges – additional engineering assistance
- Aaron Fessel – additional engineering assistance
- Chris Lord-Alge – mixing
- Tom Coyne – mastering

== Charts ==
=== Weekly charts ===
| Chart (2005–2006) | Peak position |
|---|---|
| Australia (ARIA) | 1 |
| Austria (Ö3 Austria Top 40) | 6 |
| Belgium (Ultratop 50 Flanders) | 14 |
| Belgium (Ultratop 50 Wallonia) | 13 |
| Canada AC Top 30 (Radio & Records) | 1 |
| Canada CHR/Pop Top 30 (Radio & Records) | 3 |
| Canada Hot AC Top 30 (Radio & Records) | 4 |
| CIS Airplay (TopHit) | 9 |
| Czech Republic (IFPI) | 1 |
| Denmark (Tracklisten) | 3 |
| Denmark Airplay (Tracklisten) | 7 |
| Europe (Eurochart Hot 100) | 6 |
| Europe (European Hit Radio) | 10 |
| Finland (Suomen virallinen lista) | 14 |
| Finland Airplay (Radiosoittolista) | 4 |
| France (SNEP) | 19 |
| Germany (GfK) | 3 |
| Greece (IFPI) | 11 |
| Hungary (Rádiós Top 40) | 1 |
| Ireland (IRMA) | 5 |
| Italy (FIMI) | 2 |
| Italy (Musica e dischi) | 1 |
| Japan (Oricon) | 16 |
| Latvia (Latvijas Top 50) | 12 |
| Netherlands (Dutch Top 40) | 8 |
| Netherlands (Single Top 100) | 4 |
| New Zealand (Recorded Music NZ) | 12 |
| Norway (VG-lista) | 8 |
| Poland (Nielsen Music Control) | 3 |
| Russia Airplay (TopHit) | 8 |
| Scottish Singles Sales (Official Charts) | 5 |
| Spain (Promusicae) | 2 |
| Spain Airplay (Top 40 Radio) | 7 |
| Sweden (Sverigetopplistan) | 9 |
| Switzerland (Schweizer Hitparade) | 3 |
| Switzerland Airplay (Swiss Hitparade) | 6 |
| UK Singles (Official Charts) | 8 |
| Ukraine Airplay (TopHit) | 61 |
| US Billboard Hot 100 | 13 |
| US Adult Contemporary (Billboard) | 4 |
| US Adult Pop Airplay (Billboard) | 21 |
| US Pop 100 (Billboard) | 6 |
| US Pop Airplay (Billboard) | 8 |

=== Year-end charts ===
| Chart (2005) | Position |
|---|---|
| Australia (ARIA) | 25 |
| Austria (Ö3 Austria Top 40) | 48 |
| Belgium (Ultratop 50 Wallonia) | 64 |
| Brazil (Crowley) | 23 |
| CIS Airplay (TopHit) | 18 |
| Europe (Eurochart Hot 100) | 64 |
| Europe (European Hit Radio) | 26 |
| Germany (Media Control GfK) | 59 |
| Hungary (Rádiós Top 40) | 27 |
| Italy (FIMI) | 12 |
| Netherlands (Dutch Top 40) | 82 |
| Netherlands (Single Top 100) | 78 |
| Romania (Romanian Top 100) | 24 |
| Russia Airplay (TopHit) | 15 |
| Sweden (Hitlistan) | 73 |
| Switzerland (Schweizer Hitparade) | 22 |
| Taiwan (Hito Radio) | 63 |
| UK Singles (OCC) | 172 |
| US Billboard Hot 100 | 64 |
| US Adult Contemporary (Billboard) | 12 |
| US Adult Top 40 (Billboard) | 60 |
| US Mainstream Top 40 (Billboard) | 45 |

== Certifications ==
| Region | Certification | Certified units/sales |
|---|---|---|
| Australia (ARIA) | 2× Platinum | 140,000^{‡} |
| Brazil (Pro-Música Brasil) | Gold | 30,000^{‡} |
| Italy | — | 25,000 |
| United States (RIAA) | Gold | 500,000^{*} |
^{*} Sales figures based on certification alone.^{‡} Sales+streaming figures based on certification alone.

== Release history ==
| Region | Date | Format(s) | Label(s) | Ref. |
|---|---|---|---|---|
| United States | April 11, 2005 | Contemporary hit radio | Jive | |
| United States | May 2, 2005 | Hot adult contemporary radio | Jive | |
| Japan | May 25, 2005 | CD | Jive | |
| Denmark | May 30, 2005 | CD | Jive | |
| Australia | June 13, 2005 | CD | Jive | |
| United Kingdom | June 27, 2005 | CD | Jive | |

== Cover versions ==
In 2017, international symphonic metal supergroup Exit Eden covered "Incomplete" as the 3rd track of their debut album entitled Rhapsodies in Black.
