= List of most-attended concert series at a single venue =

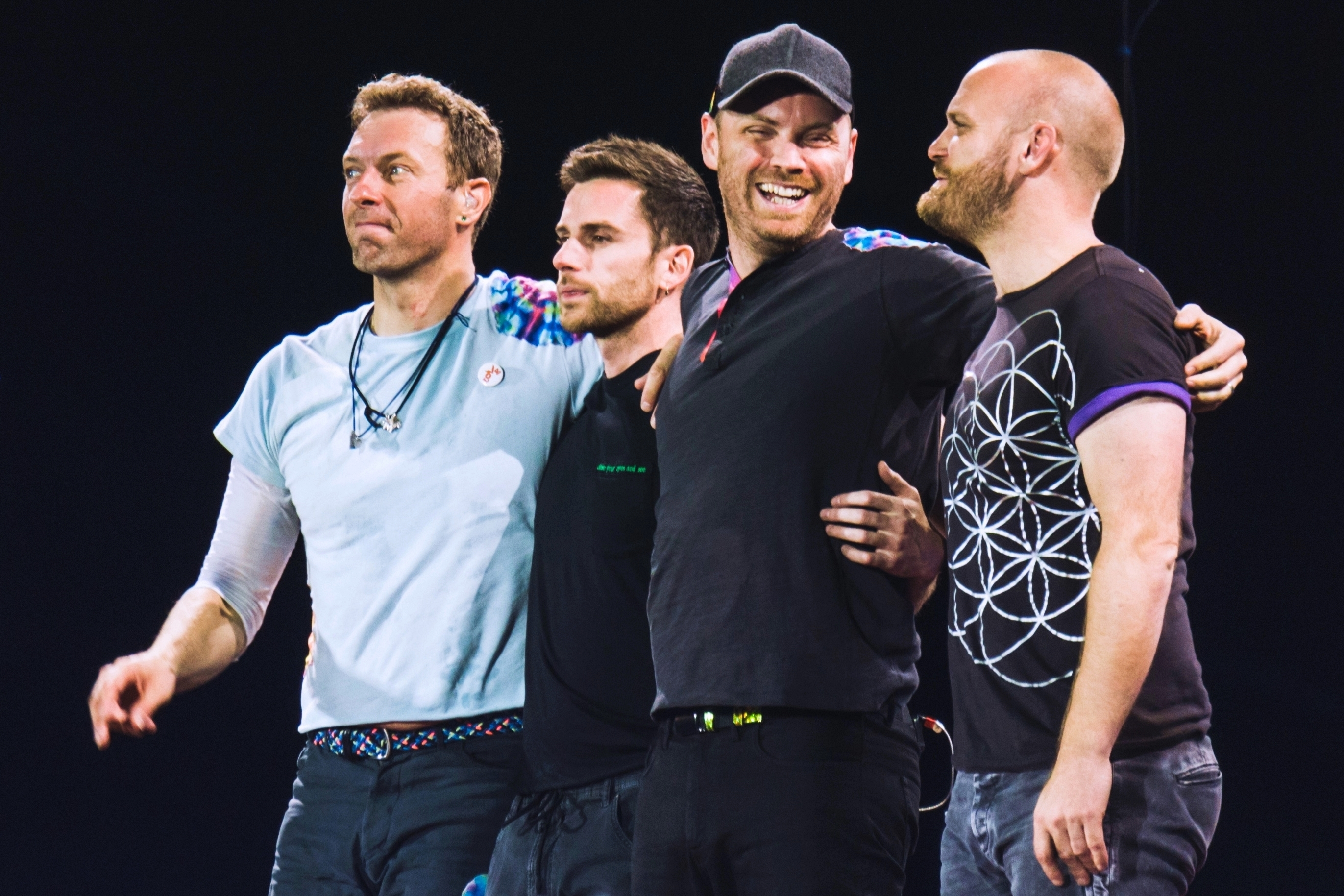
Coldplay earned the highest turnout for a multi-day tour stop with their Wembley Stadium run in 2025

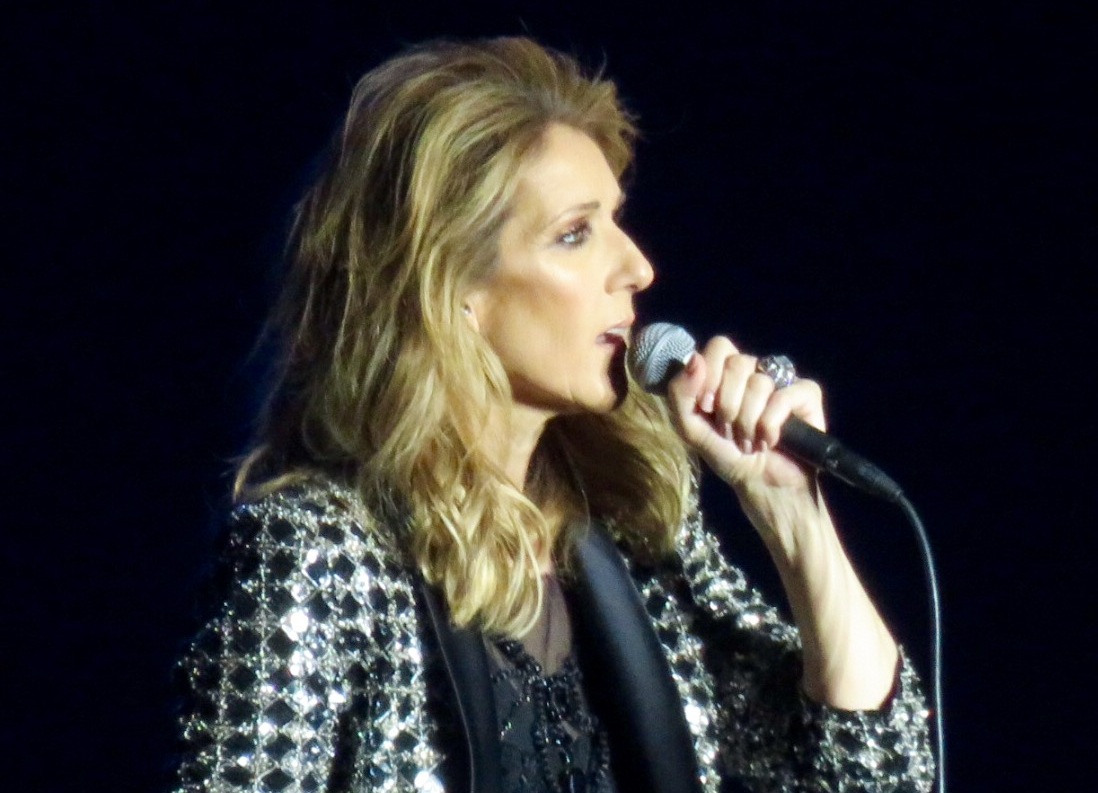
Celine Dion earned the highest turnout for a residency with her New Day... shows from 2003 to 2007

The following is a list of the most-attended concert series at a single venue (excluding music festivals). A run of concerts at the same venue may be promoted either as a standalone residency or as a multi-day stop from a larger concert tour. Both Pollstar and Billboard have defined residencies as 10 shows or more at a single location. However, Billboard omits all "mini-residencies within a tour" from its rankings, favoring events that established independent names, productions and set lists.

Bruce Springsteen and the E Street Band are the earliest known performers to sell over 300,000 tickets on a multi-day tour stop. They staged six concerts at Giants Stadium in 1985, drawing 396,936 attendees. Michael Jackson broke their record in 1988 and 1993, with seven outings at Wembley Stadium (504,000) and five at Estadio Azteca (550,000), respectively. Springsteen and the E Street Band returned to number one the following decade, as their second Giants Stadium run accounted for 566,560 entries across 10 dates.

In 2011, Take That gathered 623,737 people for eight shows at Wembley Stadium, becoming the new historic leaders. Coldplay eclipsed them by performing 10 times at Estadio River Plate in 2022, moving 626,841 admissions. Taylor Swift came next, reporting 753,112 spectators over eight Wembley Stadium concerts in 2024. She was the first woman to ever hold the record. A year later, Coldplay landed at the top again, with their 10 nights at the same venue registering an estimated turnout of 791,000 attendees.

Celine Dion ranks first among residency performers, selling 4.55 million tickets between the New Day... (2003–2007) and Celine (2011–2019) series. Elvis Presley's International Theater (1969–1976) run preceded her with 1.27 million people. Most tenures are based in the Las Vegas Valley because of its popularity as a tourist destination, though artists such as Adele and K3 have picked different locations. Billy Joel at the Garden (2014–2024) and U2:UV Achtung Baby Live at Sphere (2023–2024) top the male soloist and group categories.

== Multi-day tour stops ==
Key
*	Indicates the multi-day tour stop had sold the most tickets up to that point

Multi-day tour stops with over 300,000 tickets sold
Rank	Tickets sold	Artist	Venue	Tour title	Year	Shows	Ref.
1	791,000	Coldplay	Wembley Stadium	Music of the Spheres World Tour *	2025	10	
2	753,112	Taylor Swift	Wembley Stadium	The Eras Tour *	2024	8	
3	668,327	Shakira	Estadio GNP Seguros	Las Mujeres Ya No Lloran World Tour	2025	12	
4	655,853	Shakira	Shakira Stadium	Las Mujeres Ya No Lloran World Tour	2026	13	
5	626,841	Coldplay	Estadio River Plate	Music of the Spheres World Tour *	2022	10	
6	622,613	Bad Bunny	Metropolitano Stadium	Debí Tirar Más Fotos World Tour	2026	10	
7	623,737	Take That	Wembley Stadium	Progress Live *	2011	8	
8	566,560	Bruce Springsteen · E Street Band	Giants Stadium	The Rising Tour *	2003	10	
9	550,000	Michael Jackson	Estadio Azteca	Dangerous World Tour *	1993	5	
10	517,736	Bad Bunny	Estadio GNP Seguros	Debí Tirar Más Fotos World Tour	2025	8	
11	504,000	Michael Jackson	Wembley Stadium	Bad World Tour *	1988	7	
12	464,839	Coldplay	Wembley Stadium	Music of the Spheres World Tour	2022	6	
13	450,000	Michael Jackson	Tokyo Dome	Bad World Tour	1988	9	
14	443,223	Take That	Etihad Stadium	Progress Live	2011	8	
15	439,651	Coldplay	Estádio do Morumbi	Music of the Spheres World Tour	2023	6	
16	430,678	Roger Waters	Estadio River Plate	The Wall Live	2012	9	
17	420,269	Ed Sheeran	Wembley Stadium	+–=÷× Tour	2022	5	
18	420,000	Taylor Swift	SoFi Stadium	The Eras Tour	2023	6	(Note: Rough estimate based on the record attendance of the fourth show.)
19	396,936	Bruce Springsteen · E Street Band	Giants Stadium	Born in the U.S.A. Tour *	1985	6	
20	378,000	Taylor Swift	Singapore National Stadium	The Eras Tour	2024	6	(Note: Rough estimate based on the record attendance of the sixth show.)
21	360,069	The Rolling Stones	Memorial Coliseum	Steel Wheels Tour	1989	4	
22	347,923	RBD	Foro Sol	Soy Rebelde Tour	2023	7	
23	344,144	The Rolling Stones	Estadio River Plate	Voodoo Lounge Tour	1995	5	
24	335,394	Harry Styles	Wembley Stadium	Love On Tour	2023	4	
25	332,867	Luis Miguel	Auditorio Nacional	México Por Siempre Tour	2018	35	
26	331,892	Bruce Springsteen · E Street Band	Memorial Coliseum	Born in the U.S.A. Tour	1985	4	
27	329,200	Coldplay	Croke Park	Music of the Spheres World Tour	2024	4	
28	325,072	Coldplay	Accor Stadium	Music of the Spheres World Tour	2024	4	
29	322,028	Daddy Yankee	Foro Sol	La Última Vuelta World Tour	2022	5	
30	322,000	Bruno Mars	Tokyo Dome	Bruno Mars Live	2024	7	
31	321,113	Coldplay	Singapore National Stadium	Music of the Spheres World Tour	2024	6	
32	320,000	Taylor Swift	Accor Stadium	The Eras Tour	2024	4	(Note: Rough estimate based on the record attendance of the fourth show.)
33	318,331	Coldplay	Stade de France	Music of the Spheres World Tour	2022	4	
34	318,309	Coldplay	Goyang Stadium	Music of the Spheres World Tour	2025	6	
35	304,785	Bruce Springsteen · E Street Band	Continental Airlines Arena	Reunion Tour	1999	15	
36	303,985	Coldplay	Wembley Stadium	A Head Full of Dreams Tour	2016	4	

== Concert residencies ==
Key
*	Indicates the residency had sold the most tickets up to that point
†	Indicates an ongoing residency

Residencies with over 500,000 tickets sold
Rank	Tickets sold	Artist	Venue	Residency title	Year	Shows	Ref.
1	2,814,577	Celine Dion	The Colosseum at Caesars Palace	A New Day... *	2003–2007	714	
2	1,900,000	Billy Joel	Madison Square Garden	Billy Joel at the Garden	2014–2024	104	
3	1,741,175	Celine Dion	The Colosseum at Caesars Palace	Celine	2011–2019	427	
4	1,272,000	Elvis Presley	International Theater	Elvis *	1969–1976	636	(Note: Rough estimate based on the maximum capacity of the venue.)
5	982,090	Elton John	The Colosseum at Caesars Palace	The Red Piano	2004–2009	247	
6	981,000	Eagles	Sphere	Live in Concert at Sphere †	2024–2025	60	
7	934,000	Backstreet Boys	Sphere	Into the Millennium †	2025–2026	56	
8	916,184	Britney Spears	Zappos Theater	Piece of Me	2013–2017	248	
9	776,518	Elton John	The Colosseum at Caesars Palace	The Million Dollar Piano	2011–2018	189	
10	774,000	Dead & Company	Sphere	Dead Forever: Live at Sphere	2024–2025	48	
11	730,000	Adele	Messe München	Adele in Munich	2024	10	
12	697,765	Cher	The Colosseum at Caesars Palace	Cher	2008–2011	192	
13	662,532	U2	Sphere	U2:UV Achtung Baby Live at Sphere	2023–2024	40	
14	602,000	George Strait	T-Mobile Arena	Strait to Vegas	2016–2022	36	
15	574,000	Bruno Mars	Dolby Live	Bruno Mars at Park MGM	2016–2025	110	
16	556,000	Rod Stewart	The Colosseum at Caesars Palace	The Hits	2011–2024	149	
17	539,000	Celine Dion	Plenitude Arena	Celine Dion Paris †	2026–2027	16	
18	537,817	Bette Midler	The Colosseum at Caesars Palace	The Showgirl Must Go On	2008–2010	170	
19	500,000	K3	AFAS Dome	K3 Originals: De Reünie	2025–2026	30	

== See also ==
- List of most-attended concerts
- List of highest-grossing live music artists
- List of highest-grossing concert tours
- List of highest-grossing concert tours by Latin artists
- List of highest-grossing concert tours by women
- List of highest-grossing concert series at a single venue
- List of highest-grossing benefit concerts
