= List of highest-grossing concert series =

List of highest-grossing concert series may refer to:

- List of highest-grossing concert series at multiple venues
- List of highest-grossing concert series at a single venue
- List of Billboard Boxscore number-one concert series of the 2020s, highest-grossing concert series reported by Billboard

== See also ==
- List of most-attended concert series
