= Backstreet Boys: Into The Millennium Homecoming: Live In Germany =

2026 concert residency by Backstreet Boys

- Residency by Backstreet Boys
- Location: Düsseldorf, Germany
- Venue: Merkur Spiel-Arena
- Associated album: Millennium (25th anniversary)
- Start date: September 25, 2026
- End date: October 7, 2026
- No. of shows: 10

Backstreet Boys concert chronology
- Backstreet Boys: Into the Millennium (2025–2027); Backstreet Boys: Into The Millennium Homecoming: Live In Germany (2026); Backstreet Boys: Into The Millenium Homecoming: Live In Canada (2027)

Backstreet Boys: Into The Millennium Homecoming: Live In Germany is the third concert residency by American vocal group Backstreet Boys, which takes place at Merkur Spiel-Arena in Düsseldorf, Germany. The show primarily features songs from their 1999 album Millennium to celebrate the 25th anniversary of its release.

== Set list ==
The following set list was performed at the opening concert on September 25, 2026.

1. "Larger than Life"
2. "It's Gotta Be You"
3. "As Long as You Love Me"
4. "More than That"
5. "Incomplete"
6. "That's the Way I Like It"
7. "Don't Want You Back"
8. "Get Another Boyfriend"
9. "Show Me the Meaning of Being Lonely"
10. "Don't Wanna Lose You Now"
11. "I'll Never Break Your Heart"
12. "The One"
13. "Back to Your Heart"
14. "Spanish Eyes"
15. "No One Else Comes Close"
16. "The Perfect Fan"
17. "Drowning"
18. "Hey Mr DJ (Keep Playing This Song)"
19. "All I Have to Give"
20. "Quit Playing Games (with My Heart)"
21. "Shape of My Heart"
22. "I Want It That Way"
23. "Get Down (You're the One for Me)"
24. "We've Got It Goin' On"
25. "The Call"
26. "Everybody (Backstreet's Back)"

== Concert dates ==
Concert dates for Backstreet Boys: Into the Millennium
Date	Attendance	Revenue
September 25, 2026	—	—
September 26, 2026	—	—
September 27, 2026	—	—
September 29, 2026	—	—
September 30, 2026	—	—
October 2, 2026	—	—
October 3, 2026	—	—
October 4, 2026	—	—
October 6, 2026	—	—
October 7, 2026	—	—
Total	—	—
