= Strait to Vegas =

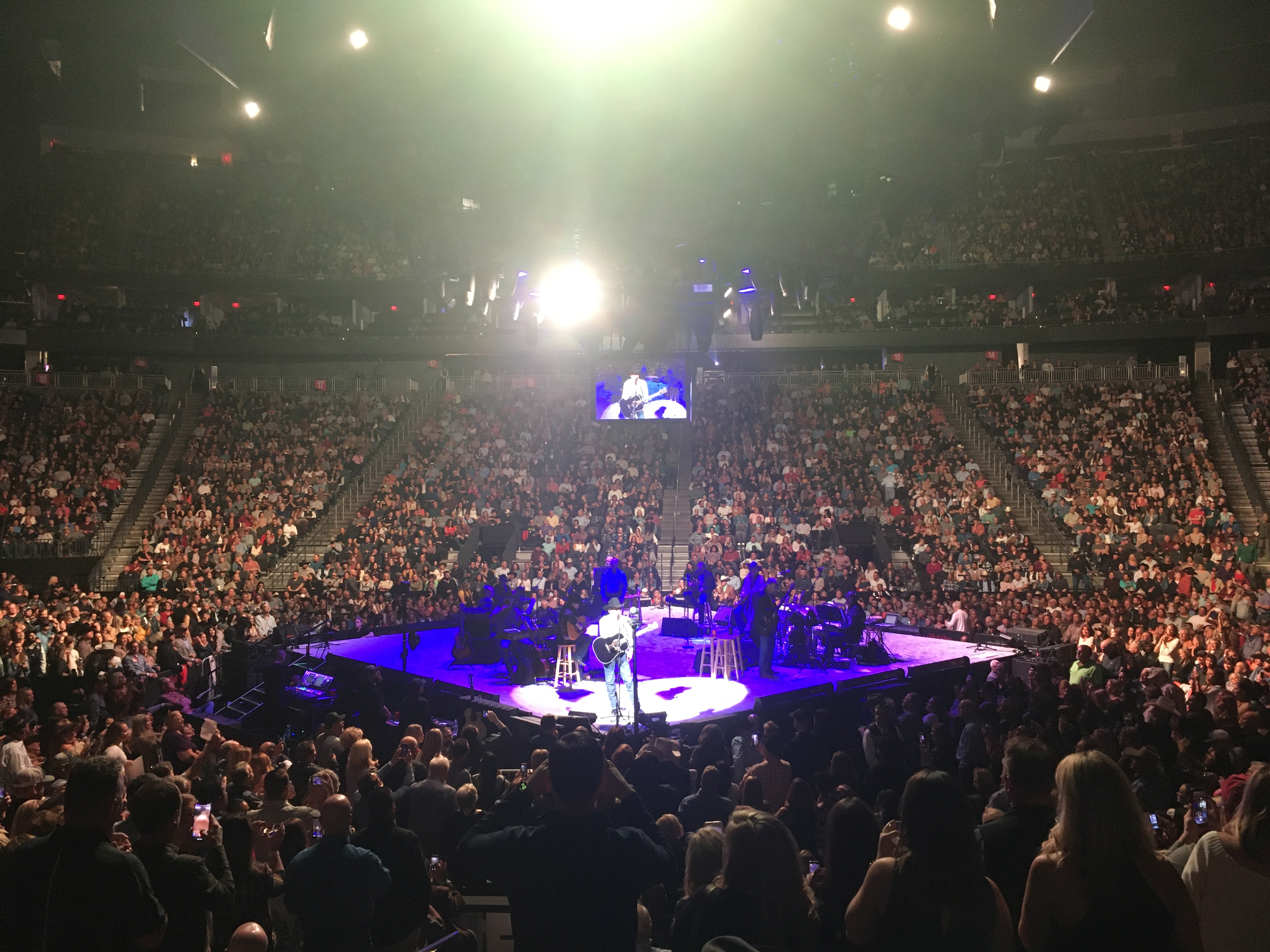
Strait performing on December 7, 2019

Strait to Vegas was a concert residency by country music artist George Strait at T-Mobile Arena on the Las Vegas Strip. It included 18 weekends of concerts, from April 22, 2016, to December 3, 2022.

The residency was announced in a press conference on September 22, 2015 at MGM Grand Las Vegas. It was initially scheduled for four dates over two weekends, was later extended several times.

Shows in April, July, and December of 2017 were branded as "2 Nights of Number 1s", with the setlist for each weekend consisting primarily of Strait's 60 chart-topping songs. The September 2017 shows focused on the soundtrack to Strait's film, Pure Country, in honor of its 25th anniversary.

== Residency dates ==
- April 22–23, 2016
- September 9–10, 2016
- December 2–3, 2016
- February 17–18, 2017
- April 7–8, 2017
- July 28–29, 2017
- September 1–2, 2017
- December 8–9, 2017
- February 2–3, 2018
- December 7–8, 2018
- February 1–2, 2019
- August 23–24, 2019
- December 6–7, 2019
- January 31–February 1, 2020
- August 13–14, 2021
- December 3–4, 2021
- February 11–12, 2022
- December 2–3, 2022

== Opening acts ==
- Kacey Musgraves (April 2016–February 2017)
- Cam (April 2017–December 2017)
- Lyle Lovett & Robert Earl Keen (2018)
- Ashley McBryde (2019)
- Gone West (2020)
- Caitlyn Smith (2021 & December 2022)
- Tenille Townes (February 2022)

== See also ==
- List of most-attended concert series at a single venue
