= List of most-attended concert series =

List of most-attended concert series may refer to:

- List of most-attended concert series at multiple venues
- List of most-attended concert series at a single venue

== See also ==
- List of most-attended concerts
- List of highest-grossing concert series
