= Backstreet Boys: Into the Millennium =

2025-2027 concert residency by Backstreet Boys

- Residency by Backstreet Boys
- Location: Paradise, Nevada, United States
- Venue: Sphere
- Associated album: Millennium (25th anniversary)
- Start date: July 11, 2025
- End date: January 2, 2027
- No. of shows: 61
- Producer: Live Nation

Backstreet Boys concert chronology
- DNA World Tour (2019–2024); Backstreet Boys: Into the Millennium (2025–2027); Backstreet Boys: Into The Millennium Homecoming: Live In Germany (2026)

Backstreet Boys: Into the Millennium is the second concert residency by American vocal group Backstreet Boys, which takes place at Sphere in Paradise, Nevada, in the Las Vegas Valley. The show primarily features songs from their 1999 album Millennium to celebrate the 25th anniversary of its release. They are the first pop act to perform at Sphere.

== Background ==
The residency was announced on February 11, 2025. Promotional efforts included a live performance and interview on Today, a brand partnership with Crumbl featuring five desserts inspired by each band member, and Backstreet Boys Terminal, an "immersive pop-up experience" located at The Venetian Resort. Backstreet Boys Terminal is a two-story, interactive exhibit where fans can take photos with Millennium-themed sets, view memorabilia, purchase exclusive merchandise, and write messages for the band to read. The band also released Millennium 2.0, a remastered edition of their album with additional unreleased demos, live recordings from the original Into the Millennium Tour, and a new single, “Hey."

In an interview with Billboard, the band encouraged fans to wear "something all-white" to the show.

== Production ==
=== Staging ===
The staging for the tour featured a floating platform suspended by wires that levitated from the main stage up to 75 feet. Stage directors added a metal support stand to the platform to accommodate vocalist Brian Littrell's fear of heights.

=== Performance and show elements ===
Baz Halpin, show producer and director, described production as "technologically complicated" and a distinct concept from the Into the Millennium Tour that took place in 1999-2000. “We wanted to build a story around Millennium — give it a character, then let world-building from song-to-song transpire from that... We’ve built a galaxy which incorporates things people will recognize, but it’s Spherified.” The Big Sky motion-control camera system was used to capture live-action movements for projected visuals.

== Critical reception ==
The residency has received widespread critical acclaim. Billboard wrote, "They didn’t miss a note or a beat — as they also included all the nostalgic choreography we’ve come to expect." USA Today highlighted "Siberia" as notable performance and wrote, "the adrenaline of the final batch of songs would enthrall even the snarkiest music purists." Glamour stated, "The visuals were out of this world." Las Vegas Weekly wrote, "That 16k resolution screen, a vision of technological wizardry, shapeshifted before our eyes to bring the Backstreet Boys’ vision into the modern age."

== Commercial performance ==
As of February 2026, there have been 550,620 tickets sold and a total gross revenue of $93.5 million.

== Set list ==
The following set list was performed at the opening concert on July 11, 2025.

1. "Larger than Life" (contains elements from "Can You Feel It (The Jacksons song)")
2. "It's Gotta Be You"(contains elements from "Beat It")
3. "As Long as You Love Me"
4. "More than That"
5. "I Need You Tonight"
6. "Siberia"
7. "Don't Want You Back"
8. "Get Another Boyfriend"
9. "Show Me the Meaning of Being Lonely"
10. "Don't Wanna Lose You Now"
11. "Hey"
12. "The One"
13. "Back to Your Heart"
14. "Spanish Eyes"
15. "No One Else Comes Close"
16. "The Perfect Fan"
17. "All I Have to Give"
18. "Drowning"
19. "Quit Playing Games (with My Heart)"
20. "Shape of My Heart"
21. "I Want It That Way"
22. "Get Down (You're the One for Me) (contains elements from "Get Down On It")
23. "We've Got It Goin' On"
24. "The Call"
25. "Everybody (Backstreet's Back)" (contains elements from "Seven Nation Army")

== Concert dates ==
Concert dates for Backstreet Boys: Into the Millennium
Date	Attendance	Revenue
Leg 1:
July 11, 2025	—	—
July 12, 2025	—	—
July 13, 2025	—	—
July 18, 2025	—	—
July 19, 2025	—	—
July 20, 2025	—	—
July 25, 2025	—	—
July 26, 2025	—	—
July 27, 2025	—	—
August 1, 2025	—	—
August 2, 2025	—	—
August 3, 2025	—	—
August 8, 2025	—	—
August 9, 2025	—	—
August 10, 2025	—	—
August 15, 2025	—	—
August 16, 2025	—	—
August 17, 2025	—	—
August 22, 2025	—	—
August 23, 2025	—	—
August 24, 2025	—	—
Leg 2:
December 26, 2025	—	—
December 27, 2025	—	—
December 28, 2025	—	—
December 30, 2025	—	—
December 31, 2025	—	—
January 2, 2026	—	—
January 3, 2026	—	—
Leg 3:
February 5, 2026	—	—
February 6, 2026	—	—
February 7, 2026	—	—
February 11, 2026	—	—
February 13, 2026	—	—
February 14, 2026	—	—
February 15, 2026	—	—
Leg 4:
July 16, 2026	—	—
July 17, 2026	—	—
July 18, 2026	—	—
July 23, 2026	—	—
July 24, 2026	—	—
July 25, 2026	—	—
July 30, 2026	—	—
July 31, 2026	—	—
August 1, 2026	—	—
August 6, 2026	—	—
August 7, 2026	—	—
August 8, 2026	—	—
August 13, 2026	—	—
August 14, 2026	—	—
August 15, 2026	—	—
August 20, 2026	—	—
August 21, 2026	—	—
August 22, 2026	—	—
August 27, 2026	—	—
August 28, 2026	—	—
August 29, 2026	—	—
Leg 5:
December 26, 2026	—	—
December 27, 2026	—	—
December 31, 2026	—	—
January 1, 2027	—	—
January 2, 2027	—	—
Total	—	—

== See also ==
- List of highest-grossing concert series at a single venue
