= T-Mobile Arena =

Multi-purpose indoor arena in Paradise, Nevada, United States

- The Fortress

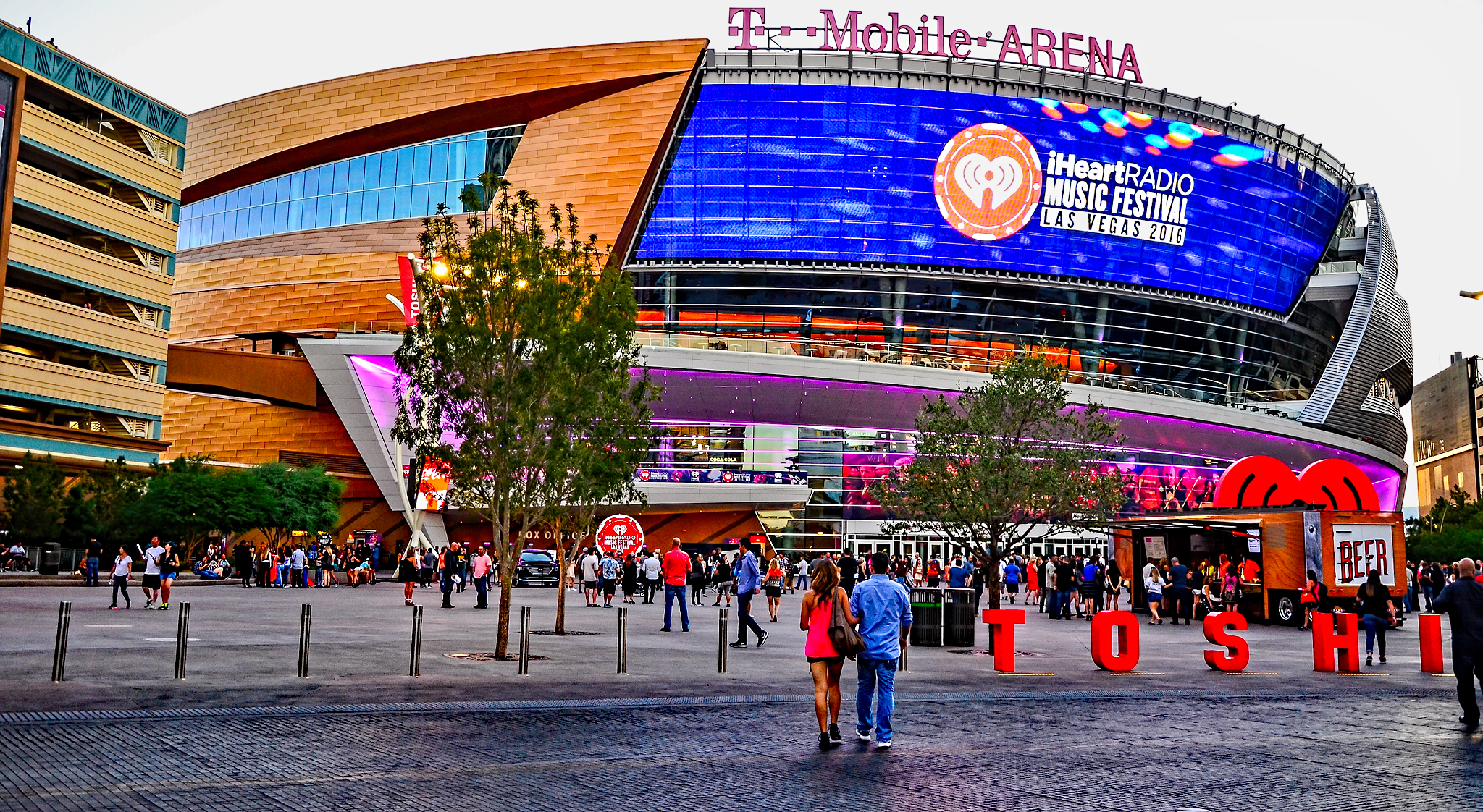
- T-Mobile Arena in 2016

- Location in Nevada Location in the United States Location in North America
- Interactive map of T-Mobile Arena
- Former names: Las Vegas Arena (planning/construction)
- Address: 3780 South Las Vegas Boulevard
- Location: Paradise, Nevada, United States
- Coordinates: 36°06′10″N 115°10′42″W
- Owner: Anschutz Entertainment Group (42.5%); MGM Resorts International (42.5%); Bill Foley (15%)
- Operator: MGM Resorts International
- Capacity: Basketball: 18,000 (20,000 with standing room); Boxing/MMA/Pro Wrestling: 20,000; Concerts: 12,000–20,000; Ice hockey: 17,500 (20,000 with standing room)
- Record attendance: Ice hockey: 19,058 (June 13, 2023)
- Acreage: 16 acres (6.5 ha)
- Public transit: Las Vegas Monorail at MGM Grand; RTC Transit routes 201, 301, 502, 605, 606, 607, 608, 902

Construction
- Groundbreaking: May 1, 2014; 12 years ago
- Opened: April 6, 2016; 10 years ago
- Cost: $375 million
- Architect: Populous
- Project manager: ICON Venue Group
- Structural engineer: Thornton Tomasetti
- Services engineer: ME Engineers
- General contractors: Penta Building Group; Hunt Construction Group

Tenants
- Vegas Golden Knights (NHL) (2017–present); Vegas Vanguards (PWHL) (beginning in 2026)

Website
- t-mobilearena.com

T-Mobile Arena is a multi-purpose indoor arena in Paradise, Nevada, United States. Opened on April 6, 2016, it is the home arena of the Vegas Golden Knights of the National Hockey League (NHL) and the Vegas Vanguards of the Professional Women's Hockey League (PWHL). A joint venture between MGM Resorts International and Anschutz Entertainment Group (AEG), T-Mobile Arena is situated on the Las Vegas Strip behind the New York-New York and Park MGM casino hotels. It has been nicknamed "The Fortress".

T-Mobile Arena has hosted various sports and entertainment events, with the latter including concerts, award shows, and beauty pageants. The arena has also hosted various combat sport events, including mixed martial arts (MMA), boxing, and professional wrestling. MMA promoter Ultimate Fighting Championship (UFC) signed a long-term tenancy agreement with T-Mobile Arena in 2017, under which it agreed to host four events per-year over the next seven years.

== History ==
The Anschutz Entertainment Group (AEG) first tried to build an arena in Las Vegas in association with Harrah's Entertainment. In 2007, the joint venture announced they would build a 20,000 seat stadium behind the Bally's and Paris casino-hotels. Caesars Entertainment had previously envisioned using the location to build a baseball park, but the company's buyout by Harrah's cancelled the plans. Through the following year, Harrah's became uncertain on continuing with the project, not knowing if AEG would split the costs, and whether building a major league-ready stadium without a guaranteed franchise to play on it would be feasible during the 2008 financial crisis. The original plans were to break ground in June 2008 and finish the arena in 2010, but by 2009, it was revealed that the stalled project had not even done a traffic study despite being located near a busy intersection. In 2010, the plans were changed to use an area behind the Imperial Palace. However, given the financing would require a special taxation district, opposition from Clark County regarding using public money in the project stalled it even further. AEG eventually backed out completely by 2012, once MGM Resorts International came up with their own project using a terrain behind the New York-New York and Monte Carlo resorts. This attracted AEG primarily for not relying on public funding.

MGM and AEG announced their joint arena plan on March 1, 2013. Plans were further fleshed out over the following months with the announcement of a $100-million pedestrian shopping area, The Park, to serve as a gateway to the arena, and the retention of prominent sports architecture firm Populous to design the project. Other firms on the project include: the ICON Venue Group, Thornton Tomasetti, ME Engineers, Penta Building Group and Hunt Construction Group.

The project broke ground on May 1, 2014, followed by the demolition of existing buildings, and excavation of an oval area for the arena. The final steel beam of the structure was placed on May 27, 2015.

In January 2016, T-Mobile US announced that it had acquired the naming rights to the new arena in a multi-year contract. The arena held its grand opening on April 6, 2016, with a concert by Las Vegas natives The Killers, Shamir and Wayne Newton. Country music artists Martina McBride and Cam performed at a soft opening on March 31, 2016.

In 2016, the National Hockey League awarded an expansion team to a Las Vegas ownership group led by Bill Foley, with T-Mobile Arena as its home venue. As part of the team's lease, Foley negotiated an option to buy a stake in the arena from MGM and AEG. He exercised that option in September 2016, buying a 15 percent interest for around $35 million.

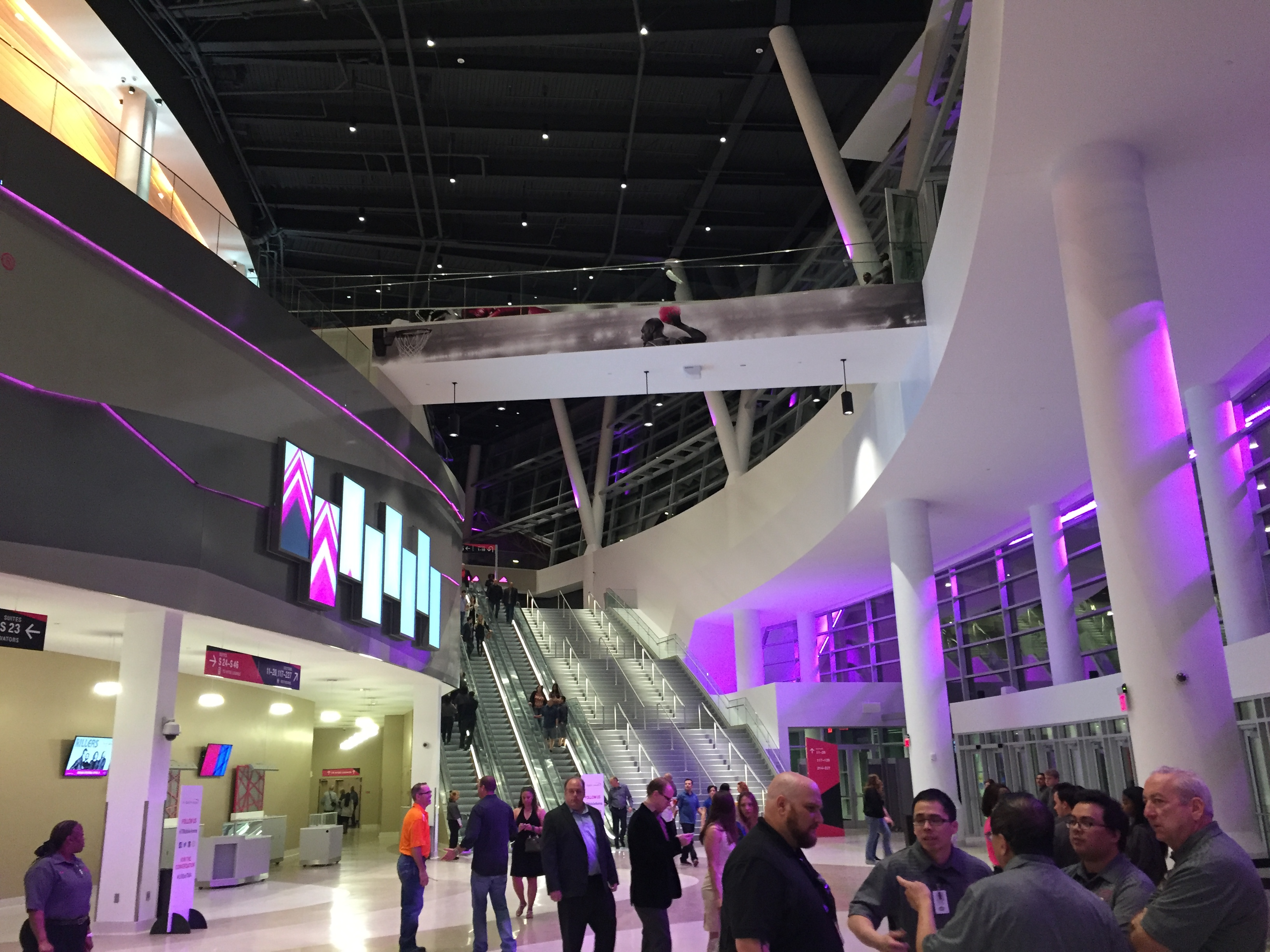
Interior of venue, shown on March 31, 2016

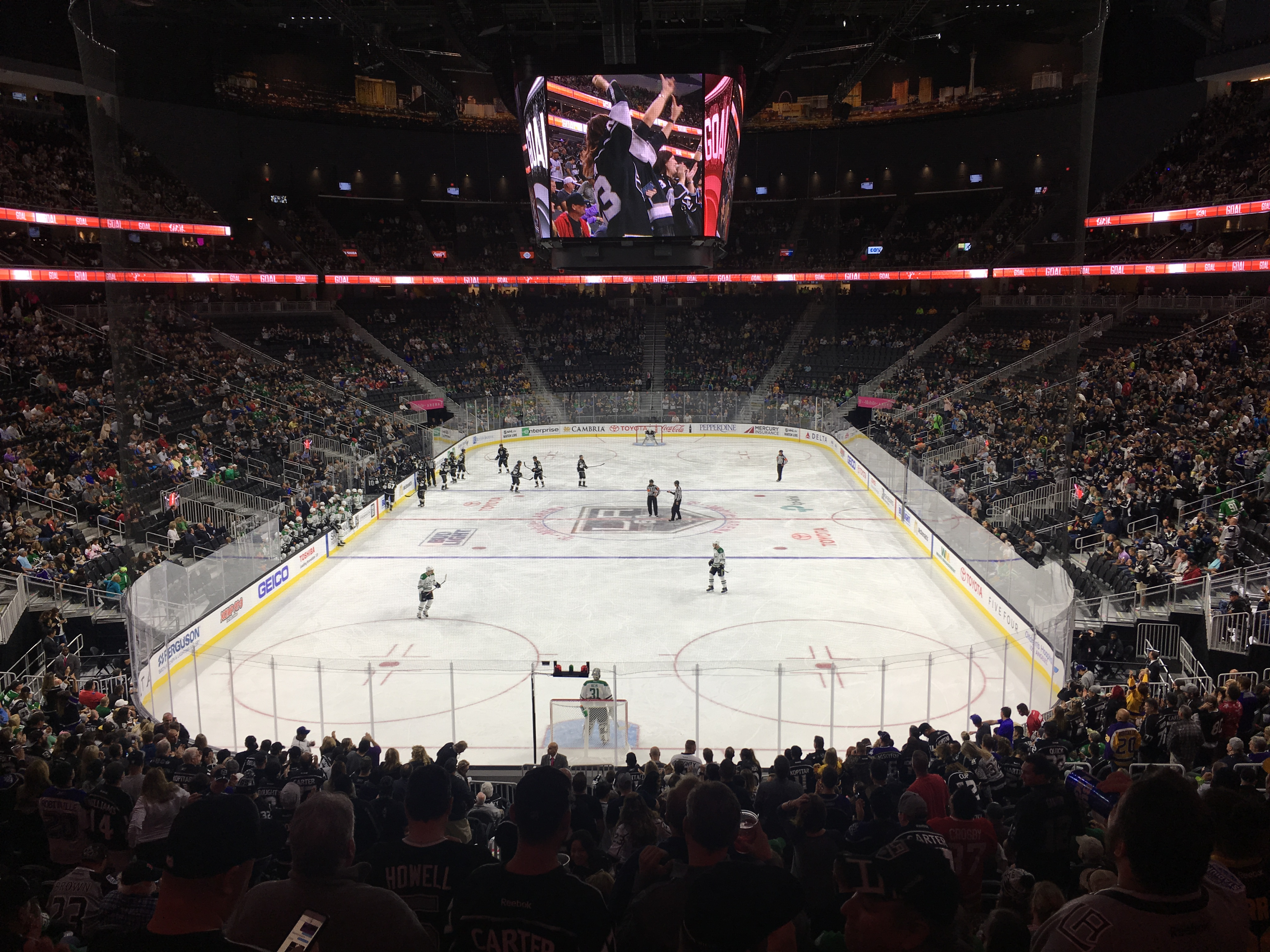
Interior during a hockey game

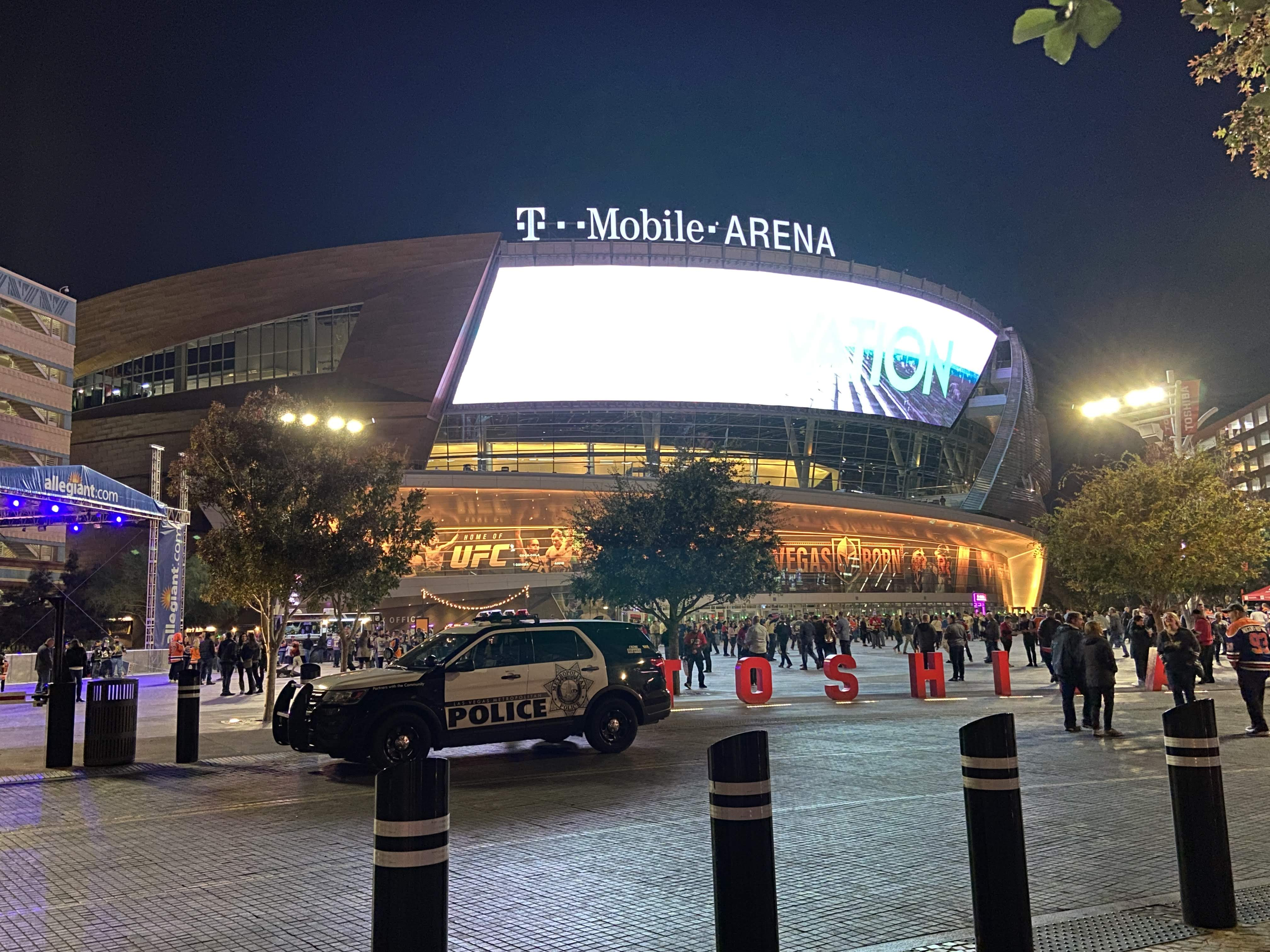
T-Mobile Arena at night

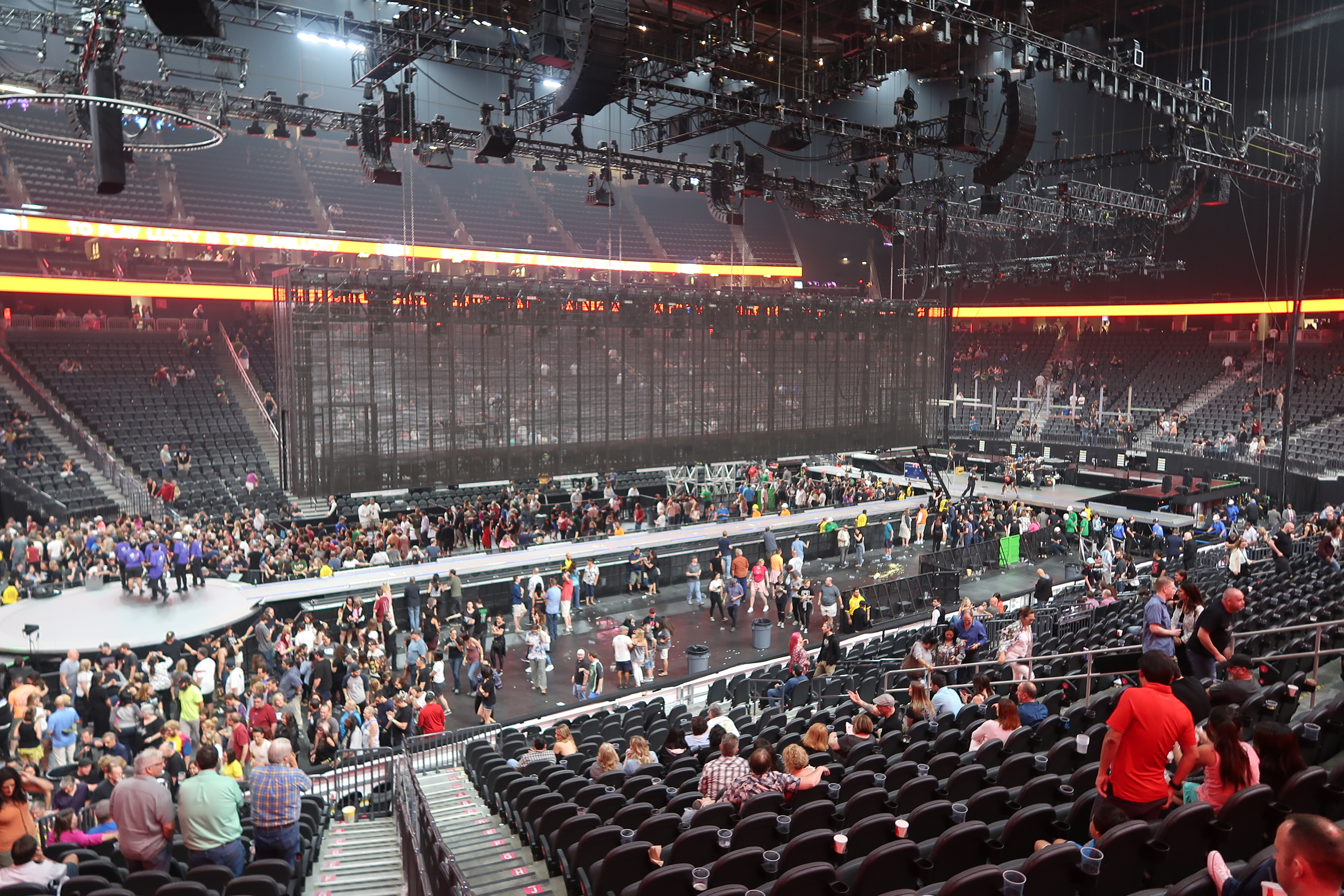
U2 at T-Mobile Arena

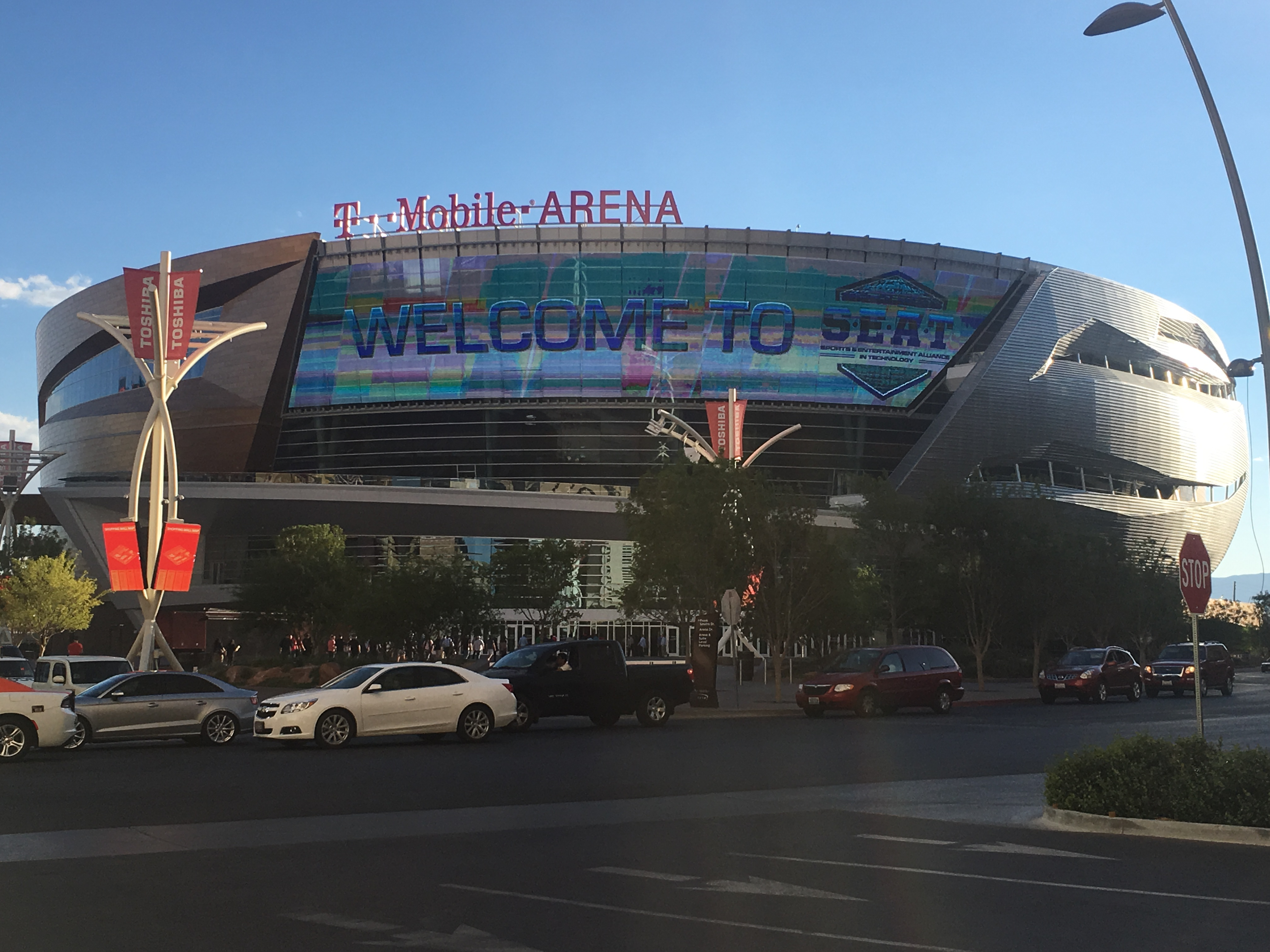
T-Mobile Arena

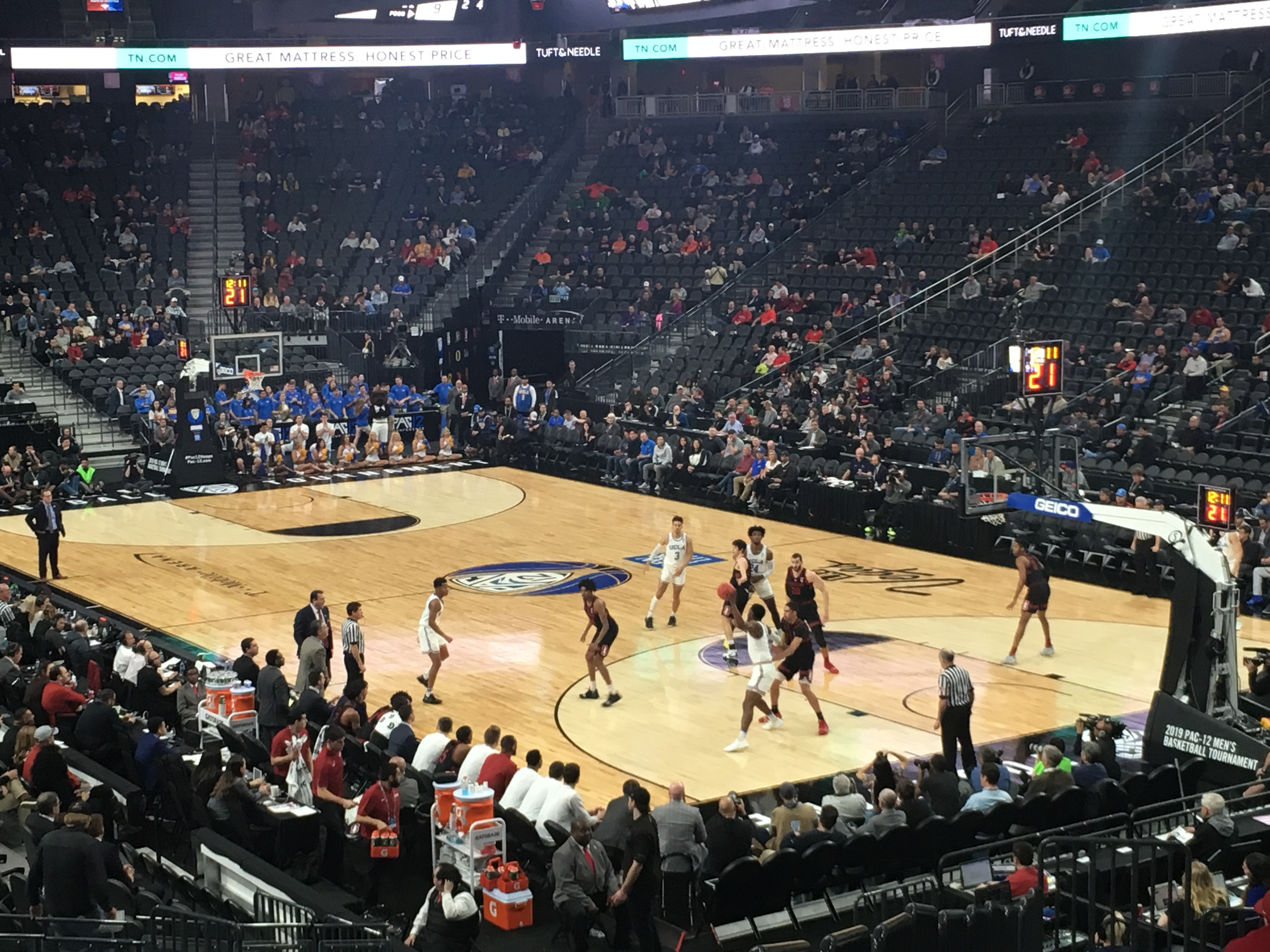
UCLA vs. Stanford at the 2019 Pac 12 Tournament

== Tenants ==
During its construction, T-Mobile Arena was pointed to as the home arena for a possible National Hockey League expansion team in Las Vegas. The expansion bid was approved and announced by the NHL on June 22, 2016; the new team, the Vegas Golden Knights, began play in the 2017–18 season.

The Ultimate Fighting Championship's first event at the venue was UFC 200: Tate vs. Nunes, held on July 9, 2016. In March 2017, the UFC signed a seven-year agreement to become an official tenant of T-Mobile Arena. The promotion agreed to host at least four events per-year at the facility, in exchange for receiving permanent retail space and signage.

The Professional Bull Riders (PBR) World Finals moved to T-Mobile Arena in 2016, moving from the Thomas & Mack Center, followed by the Pac-12 Conference men's basketball tournament, which moved from the MGM Grand Garden Arena. The PBR World Finals were held at T-Mobile Arena from 2016 to 2019, and again in 2021. Since 2022, the arena is home to the PBR Team Series Championship.

The UNLV men's basketball team played at least one game at T-Mobile Arena in each of the first three seasons after the venue's opening. The Runnin' Rebels played and lost to Duke in December 2016, defeated Rice and Utah in successive games in November 2017, and defeated BYU in November 2018.

The Las Vegas Aces of the WNBA have played several games at T-Mobile Arena since 2023. The team drew 17,406 spectators to their first game at T-Mobile Arena, played on September 10, 2023, against the Phoenix Mercury, and also hosted a WNBA Playoffs game at the arena three days later. The Aces' primary home at Michelob Ultra Arena was unavailable due to a scheduling conflict. Two 2024 regular season games were played at T-Mobile Arena and four 2025 regular season games will be played at T-Mobile Arena.

On May 13, 2026, the Professional Women's Hockey League awarded a team to play at T-Mobile Arena; the Vegas Vanguards will begin play for the 2026–27 season.

== Notable events ==
In addition to Golden Knights games and UFC events, a number of major sporting events have been held at the arena, including boxing matches such as Canelo Álvarez vs. Gennady Golovkin and Floyd Mayweather Jr. vs. Conor McGregor. By virtue of the Golden Knights winning the 2017–18 Western Conference finals, it also played host to three games of the 2018 Stanley Cup Final, between the Golden Knights and the Washington Capitals, including the cup-clinching fifth game which awarded the Capitals their first Stanley Cup in franchise history. The arena hosted three games of the 2023 Stanley Cup Final between the Golden Knights and the Florida Panthers, culminating in a series-clinching 9–3 Game 5 win for the Golden Knights on June 13, 2023. The arena also hosted three games of the 2026 Stanley Cup Final, in which the Carolina Hurricanes won their second Stanley Cup in Game 6.

The arena also hosted the Frozen Four of the 2026 NCAA Division I men's ice hockey tournament from April 9 to 11, 2026.

The arena has hosted nationally televised entertainment events such as the Academy of Country Music Awards, the Billboard Music Awards, the iHeartRadio Music Festival, the Latin Grammy Awards, and the Miss USA beauty pageant. It is also a stop on many national concert tours, and hosts Strait to Vegas, a concert residency by George Strait.

WWE hosted the first professional wrestling event at the arena in June 2016, with its Money in the Bank pay-per-view. It hosted multiple support events for WrestleMania 41 in 2025 and WrestleMania 42 in 2026, including the pre-WrestleMania edition of SmackDown, NXT's Stand & Deliver, and the post-WrestleMania Raw. All Elite Wrestling (AEW) made its debut at the arena with Double or Nothing in 2022, which was the promotion's first event to exceed $1 million in gate revenue.

The semifinals and final game of the 2023 NBA In-Season Tournament, 2024 NBA Cup, and 2025 NBA Cup were held at T-Mobile Arena.

== See also ==
- Allegiant Stadium, the home of the NFL's Las Vegas Raiders and NCAA's UNLV Rebels football
- Las Vegas Ballpark, the home of the Pacific Coast League's Las Vegas Aviators
- MGM Grand Garden Arena
- Michelob Ultra Arena, formerly known as the Mandalay Bay Events Center
- Orleans Arena
- Sphere, an arena opened in 2023
- New Las Vegas Stadium, the future home of the MLB's Athletics; set to open in 2028
