= The Million Dollar Piano =

2011–18 concert residency by Elton John

- Residency by Elton John
- Official logo of the show
- Location: Paradise, Nevada, U.S.
- Venue: The Colosseum at Caesars Palace
- Start date: September 28, 2011
- End date: May 17, 2018
- No. of shows: 16 in 2011; 21 in 2012; 27 in 2013; 16 in 2014; 34 in 2015; 31 in 2016; 25 in 2017; 27 in 2018; 197 in total

Elton John concert chronology
- The Red Piano (2004–09); The Million Dollar Piano (2011–18)

The Million Dollar Piano was a concert residency by British musician Elton John, which took place at The Colosseum at Caesars Palace on the Las Vegas Strip in Paradise, Nevada, United States. It was John's second concert residency in Las Vegas after The Red Piano.

== Home media ==
The Million Dollar Piano was recorded in February 2012 at a sell out show at the Colosseum at Caesars Palace in Las Vegas. The film was broadcast to cinemas across the world in April 2014 before being released on home media on July 1, 2014. The Blu-ray and DVD both feature additional songs from John's tour in Kyiv. The set also features a behind-the-scenes look at 'The Making of The Million Dollar Piano'. Both the DVD and Blu-ray releases have been praised for their video and sound quality.

== Set list ==
This set list is representative of most of the performances of the residency.

1. "The Bitch Is Back"
2. "Bennie and the Jets"
3. "Rocket Man"
4. "Levon"
5. "Tiny Dancer"
6. "Your Song"
7. "Mona Lisas and Mad Hatters"
8. "Better Off Dead"
9. "Indian Sunset"
10. "Blue Eyes"
11. "Goodbye Yellow Brick Road"
12. "I Guess That's Why They Call It the Blues"
13. "Don't Let the Sun Go Down on Me"
14. "Philadelphia Freedom"
15. "I'm Still Standing"
16. "Crocodile Rock"
17. "Saturday Night's Alright for Fighting"
  Encore
18. "Circle of Life"

== Concert dates ==
| Date | Attendance | Revenue |
Leg 1
| September 28, 2011 | 66,964 / 66,964 (100%) | $11,439,215 |
| September 30, 2011 | 66,964 / 66,964 (100%) | $11,439,215 |
| October 1, 2011 | 66,964 / 66,964 (100%) | $11,439,215 |
| October 2, 2011 | 66,964 / 66,964 (100%) | $11,439,215 |
| October 6, 2011 | 66,964 / 66,964 (100%) | $11,439,215 |
| October 7, 2011 | 66,964 / 66,964 (100%) | $11,439,215 |
| October 8, 2011 | 66,964 / 66,964 (100%) | $11,439,215 |
| October 9, 2011 | 66,964 / 66,964 (100%) | $11,439,215 |
| October 13, 2011 | 66,964 / 66,964 (100%) | $11,439,215 |
| October 14, 2011 | 66,964 / 66,964 (100%) | $11,439,215 |
| October 15, 2011 | 66,964 / 66,964 (100%) | $11,439,215 |
| October 18, 2011 | 66,964 / 66,964 (100%) | $11,439,215 |
| October 19, 2011 | 66,964 / 66,964 (100%) | $11,439,215 |
| October 21, 2011 | 66,964 / 66,964 (100%) | $11,439,215 |
| October 22, 2011 | 66,964 / 66,964 (100%) | $11,439,215 |
| October 23, 2011 | 66,964 / 66,964 (100%) | $11,439,215 |
Leg 2
| February 9, 2012 | 20,672 / 20,672 (100%) | $3,605,365 |
| February 10, 2012 | 20,672 / 20,672 (100%) | $3,605,365 |
| February 11, 2012 | 20,672 / 20,672 (100%) | $3,605,365 |
| February 14, 2012 | 20,672 / 20,672 (100%) | $3,605,365 |
| February 16, 2012 | 20,672 / 20,672 (100%) | $3,605,365 |
Leg 3
| April 13, 2012 | 20,901 / 20,901 (100%) | $3,723,640 |
| April 14, 2012 | 20,901 / 20,901 (100%) | $3,723,640 |
| April 15, 2012 | 20,901 / 20,901 (100%) | $3,723,640 |
| April 18, 2012 | 20,901 / 20,901 (100%) | $3,723,640 |
| April 19, 2012 | 20,901 / 20,901 (100%) | $3,723,640 |
Leg 4
| October 10, 2012 | 43,763 / 44,617 (98%) | $7,099,620 |
| October 11, 2012 | 43,763 / 44,617 (98%) | $7,099,620 |
| October 12, 2012 | 43,763 / 44,617 (98%) | $7,099,620 |
| October 13, 2012 | 43,763 / 44,617 (98%) | $7,099,620 |
| October 18, 2012 | 43,763 / 44,617 (98%) | $7,099,620 |
| October 19, 2012 | 43,763 / 44,617 (98%) | $7,099,620 |
| October 20, 2012 | 43,763 / 44,617 (98%) | $7,099,620 |
| October 21, 2012 | 43,763 / 44,617 (98%) | $7,099,620 |
| October 26, 2012 | 43,763 / 44,617 (98%) | $7,099,620 |
| October 27, 2012 | 43,763 / 44,617 (98%) | $7,099,620 |
| October 28, 2012 | 43,763 / 44,617 (98%) | $7,099,620 |
Leg 5
| April 20, 2013 | 48,353 / 50,460 (96%) | $7,671,630 |
| April 21, 2013 | 48,353 / 50,460 (96%) | $7,671,630 |
| April 23, 2013 | 48,353 / 50,460 (96%) | $7,671,630 |
| April 24, 2013 | 48,353 / 50,460 (96%) | $7,671,630 |
| April 27, 2013 | 48,353 / 50,460 (96%) | $7,671,630 |
| April 30, 2013 | 48,353 / 50,460 (96%) | $7,671,630 |
| May 1, 2013 | 48,353 / 50,460 (96%) | $7,671,630 |
| May 4, 2013 | 48,353 / 50,460 (96%) | $7,671,630 |
| May 5, 2013 | 48,353 / 50,460 (96%) | $7,671,630 |
| May 8, 2013 | 48,353 / 50,460 (96%) | $7,671,630 |
| May 9, 2013 | 48,353 / 50,460 (96%) | $7,671,630 |
| May 10, 2013 | 48,353 / 50,460 (96%) | $7,671,630 |
| May 11, 2013 | 48,353 / 50,460 (96%) | $7,671,630 |
Leg 6
| September 18, 2013 | 57,889 / 57,889 (100%) | $8,930,160 |
| September 19, 2013 | 57,889 / 57,889 (100%) | $8,930,160 |
| September 21, 2013 | 57,889 / 57,889 (100%) | $8,930,160 |
| September 24, 2013 | 57,889 / 57,889 (100%) | $8,930,160 |
| September 25, 2013 | 57,889 / 57,889 (100%) | $8,930,160 |
| September 27, 2013 | 57,889 / 57,889 (100%) | $8,930,160 |
| September 28, 2013 | 57,889 / 57,889 (100%) | $8,930,160 |
| October 1, 2013 | 57,889 / 57,889 (100%) | $8,930,160 |
| October 2, 2013 | 57,889 / 57,889 (100%) | $8,930,160 |
| October 5, 2013 | 57,889 / 57,889 (100%) | $8,930,160 |
| October 6, 2013 | 57,889 / 57,889 (100%) | $8,930,160 |
| October 9, 2013 | 57,889 / 57,889 (100%) | $8,930,160 |
| October 10, 2013 | 57,889 / 57,889 (100%) | $8,930,160 |
| October 12, 2013 | 57,889 / 57,889 (100%) | $8,930,160 |
Leg 7
| March 29, 2014 | 64,694 / 65,665 (99%) | $10,027,440 |
| March 30, 2014 | 64,694 / 65,665 (99%) | $10,027,440 |
| April 1, 2014 | 64,694 / 65,665 (99%) | $10,027,440 |
| April 3, 2014 | 64,694 / 65,665 (99%) | $10,027,440 |
| April 5, 2014 | 64,694 / 65,665 (99%) | $10,027,440 |
| April 6, 2014 | 64,694 / 65,665 (99%) | $10,027,440 |
| April 9, 2014 | 64,694 / 65,665 (99%) | $10,027,440 |
| April 10, 2014 | 64,694 / 65,665 (99%) | $10,027,440 |
| April 12, 2014 | 64,694 / 65,665 (99%) | $10,027,440 |
| April 16, 2014 | 64,694 / 65,665 (99%) | $10,027,440 |
| April 18, 2014 | 64,694 / 65,665 (99%) | $10,027,440 |
| April 19, 2014 | 64,694 / 65,665 (99%) | $10,027,440 |
| April 22, 2014 | 64,694 / 65,665 (99%) | $10,027,440 |
| April 23, 2014 | 64,694 / 65,665 (99%) | $10,027,440 |
| April 25, 2014 | 64,694 / 65,665 (99%) | $10,027,440 |
| April 26, 2014 | 64,694 / 65,665 (99%) | $10,027,440 |
Leg 8
| January 16, 2015 | 23,806 / 24,066 (99%) | $3,775,415 |
| January 17, 2015 | 23,806 / 24,066 (99%) | $3,775,415 |
| January 19, 2015 | 23,806 / 24,066 (99%) | $3,775,415 |
| January 20, 2015 | 23,806 / 24,066 (99%) | $3,775,415 |
| January 23, 2015 | 23,806 / 24,066 (99%) | $3,775,415 |
| January 24, 2015 | 23,806 / 24,066 (99%) | $3,775,415 |
Leg 9
| March 18, 2015 | 68,636 / 71,284 (96%) | $10,391,410 |
| March 20, 2015 | 68,636 / 71,284 (96%) | $10,391,410 |
| March 21, 2015 | 68,636 / 71,284 (96%) | $10,391,410 |
| March 23, 2015 | 68,636 / 71,284 (96%) | $10,391,410 |
| March 24, 2015 | 68,636 / 71,284 (96%) | $10,391,410 |
| March 27, 2015 | 68,636 / 71,284 (96%) | $10,391,410 |
| March 28, 2015 | 68,636 / 71,284 (96%) | $10,391,410 |
| March 30, 2015 | 68,636 / 71,284 (96%) | $10,391,410 |
| March 31, 2015 | 68,636 / 71,284 (96%) | $10,391,410 |
| April 3, 2015 | 68,636 / 71,284 (96%) | $10,391,410 |
| April 4, 2015 | 68,636 / 71,284 (96%) | $10,391,410 |
| April 6, 2015 | 68,636 / 71,284 (96%) | $10,391,410 |
| April 7, 2015 | 68,636 / 71,284 (96%) | $10,391,410 |
| April 10, 2015 | 68,636 / 71,284 (96%) | $10,391,410 |
| April 11, 2015 | 68,636 / 71,284 (96%) | $10,391,410 |
| April 13, 2015 | 68,636 / 71,284 (96%) | $10,391,410 |
| April 14, 2015 | 68,636 / 71,284 (96%) | $10,391,410 |
Leg 10
| October 13, 2015 | 46,330 / 46,330 (100%) | $7,363,760 |
| October 14, 2015 | 46,330 / 46,330 (100%) | $7,363,760 |
| October 16, 2015 | 46,330 / 46,330 (100%) | $7,363,760 |
| October 17, 2015 | 46,330 / 46,330 (100%) | $7,363,760 |
| October 20, 2015 | 46,330 / 46,330 (100%) | $7,363,760 |
| October 21, 2015 | 46,330 / 46,330 (100%) | $7,363,760 |
| October 23, 2015 | 46,330 / 46,330 (100%) | $7,363,760 |
| October 24, 2015 | 46,330 / 46,330 (100%) | $7,363,760 |
| October 27, 2015 | 46,330 / 46,330 (100%) | $7,363,760 |
| October 30, 2015 | 46,330 / 46,330 (100%) | $7,363,760 |
| October 31, 2015 | 46,330 / 46,330 (100%) | $7,363,760 |
Leg 11
| January 19, 2016 | — | — |
| January 20, 2016 | — | — |
| January 22, 2016 | — | — |
| January 23, 2016 | — | — |
| January 26, 2016 | — | — |
| January 27, 2016 | — | — |
| January 29, 2016 | — | — |
| January 31, 2016 | — | — |
Leg 12
| April 16, 2016 | 41,813 / 42,115 (99%) | $6,590,665 |
| April 17, 2016 | 41,813 / 42,115 (99%) | $6,590,665 |
| April 19, 2016 | 41,813 / 42,115 (99%) | $6,590,665 |
| April 20, 2016 | 41,813 / 42,115 (99%) | $6,590,665 |
| April 22, 2016 | 41,813 / 42,115 (99%) | $6,590,665 |
| April 23, 2016 | 41,813 / 42,115 (99%) | $6,590,665 |
| April 26, 2016 | 41,813 / 42,115 (99%) | $6,590,665 |
| April 27, 2016 | 41,813 / 42,115 (99%) | $6,590,665 |
| April 29, 2016 | 41,813 / 42,115 (99%) | $6,590,665 |
| April 30, 2016 | 41,813 / 42,115 (99%) | $6,590,665 |
Leg 13
| October 12, 2016 | 41,895 / 41,895 (100%) | $6,799,085 |
| October 14, 2016 | 41,895 / 41,895 (100%) | $6,799,085 |
| October 15, 2016 | 41,895 / 41,895 (100%) | $6,799,085 |
| October 19, 2016 | 41,895 / 41,895 (100%) | $6,799,085 |
| October 21, 2016 | 41,895 / 41,895 (100%) | $6,799,085 |
| October 22, 2016 | 41,895 / 41,895 (100%) | $6,799,085 |
| October 26, 2016 | 41,895 / 41,895 (100%) | $6,799,085 |
| October 28, 2016 | 41,895 / 41,895 (100%) | $6,799,085 |
| October 29, 2016 | 41,895 / 41,895 (100%) | $6,799,085 |
| October 30, 2016 | 41,895 / 41,895 (100%) | $6,799,085 |
Leg 14
| December 28, 2016 | 16,827 / 16,827 (100%) | $3,121,740 |
| December 29, 2016 | 16,827 / 16,827 (100%) | $3,121,740 |
| December 31, 2016 | 16,827 / 16,827 (100%) | $3,121,740 |
| January 1, 2017 | 16,827 / 16,827 (100%) | $3,121,740 |
Leg 15
| February 7, 2017 | 41,573 / 41,915 (99%) | $6,645,790 |
| February 8, 2017 | 41,573 / 41,915 (99%) | $6,645,790 |
| February 10, 2017 | 41,573 / 41,915 (99%) | $6,645,790 |
| February 11, 2017 | 41,573 / 41,915 (99%) | $6,645,790 |
| February 13, 2017 | 41,573 / 41,915 (99%) | $6,645,790 |
| February 14, 2017 | 41,573 / 41,915 (99%) | $6,645,790 |
| February 15, 2017 | 41,573 / 41,915 (99%) | $6,645,790 |
| February 18, 2017 | 41,573 / 41,915 (99%) | $6,645,790 |
| February 19, 2017 | 41,573 / 41,915 (99%) | $6,645,790 |
| February 20, 2017 | 41,573 / 41,915 (99%) | $6,645,790 |
Leg 16
| October 11, 2017 | 58,496 / 58,496 (100%) | $9,686,250 |
| October 13, 2017 | 58,496 / 58,496 (100%) | $9,686,250 |
| October 14, 2017 | 58,496 / 58,496 (100%) | $9,686,250 |
| October 15, 2017 | 58,496 / 58,496 (100%) | $9,686,250 |
| October 18, 2017 | 58,496 / 58,496 (100%) | $9,686,250 |
| October 20, 2017 | 58,496 / 58,496 (100%) | $9,686,250 |
| October 21, 2017 | 58,496 / 58,496 (100%) | $9,686,250 |
| October 24, 2017 | 58,496 / 58,496 (100%) | $9,686,250 |
| October 25, 2017 | 58,496 / 58,496 (100%) | $9,686,250 |
| October 27, 2017 | 58,496 / 58,496 (100%) | $9,686,250 |
| October 28, 2017 | 58,496 / 58,496 (100%) | $9,686,250 |
| November 1, 2017 | 58,496 / 58,496 (100%) | $9,686,250 |
| November 3, 2017 | 58,496 / 58,496 (100%) | $9,686,250 |
| November 4, 2017 | 58,496 / 58,496 (100%) | $9,686,250 |
Leg 17
| February 9, 2018 | 54,936 / 54,936 (100%) | $10,077,310 |
| February 10, 2018 | 54,936 / 54,936 (100%) | $10,077,310 |
| February 11, 2018 | 54,936 / 54,936 (100%) | $10,077,310 |
| February 14, 2018 | 54,936 / 54,936 (100%) | $10,077,310 |
| February 16, 2018 | 54,936 / 54,936 (100%) | $10,077,310 |
| February 17, 2018 | 54,936 / 54,936 (100%) | $10,077,310 |
| February 18, 2018 | 54,936 / 54,936 (100%) | $10,077,310 |
| February 21, 2018 | 54,936 / 54,936 (100%) | $10,077,310 |
| February 22, 2018 | 54,936 / 54,936 (100%) | $10,077,310 |
| February 25, 2018 | 54,936 / 54,936 (100%) | $10,077,310 |
| February 27, 2018 | 54,936 / 54,936 (100%) | $10,077,310 |
| March 1, 2018 | 54,936 / 54,936 (100%) | $10,077,310 |
| March 2, 2018 | 54,936 / 54,936 (100%) | $10,077,310 |
Leg 18
| April 28, 2018 | 58,970 / 58,970 (100%) | $14,242,301 |
| April 29, 2018 | 58,970 / 58,970 (100%) | $14,242,301 |
| May 1, 2018 | 58,970 / 58,970 (100%) | $14,242,301 |
| May 2, 2018 | 58,970 / 58,970 (100%) | $14,242,301 |
| May 4, 2018 | 58,970 / 58,970 (100%) | $14,242,301 |
| May 5, 2018 | 58,970 / 58,970 (100%) | $14,242,301 |
| May 6, 2018 | 58,970 / 58,970 (100%) | $14,242,301 |
| May 8, 2018 | 58,970 / 58,970 (100%) | $14,242,301 |
| May 9, 2018 | 58,970 / 58,970 (100%) | $14,242,301 |
| May 11, 2018 | 58,970 / 58,970 (100%) | $14,242,301 |
| May 12, 2018 | 58,970 / 58,970 (100%) | $14,242,301 |
| May 15, 2018 | 58,970 / 58,970 (100%) | $14,242,301 |
| May 16, 2018 | 58,970 / 58,970 (100%) | $14,242,301 |
| May 17, 2018 | 58,970 / 58,970 (100%) | $14,242,301 |
| Total | 776,518 / 784,002 (99%) | $131,190,796 |

== Personnel ==
- Elton John – vocals, piano
- Davey Johnstone – guitar
- Bob Birch – bass
- John Mahon – percussion
- Nigel Olsson – drums
- Kim Bullard – keyboards
- Ray Cooper – percussion

== See also ==
- List of highest-grossing concert series at a single venue
- List of most-attended concert series at a single venue
