= List of highest-grossing concert series at a single venue =

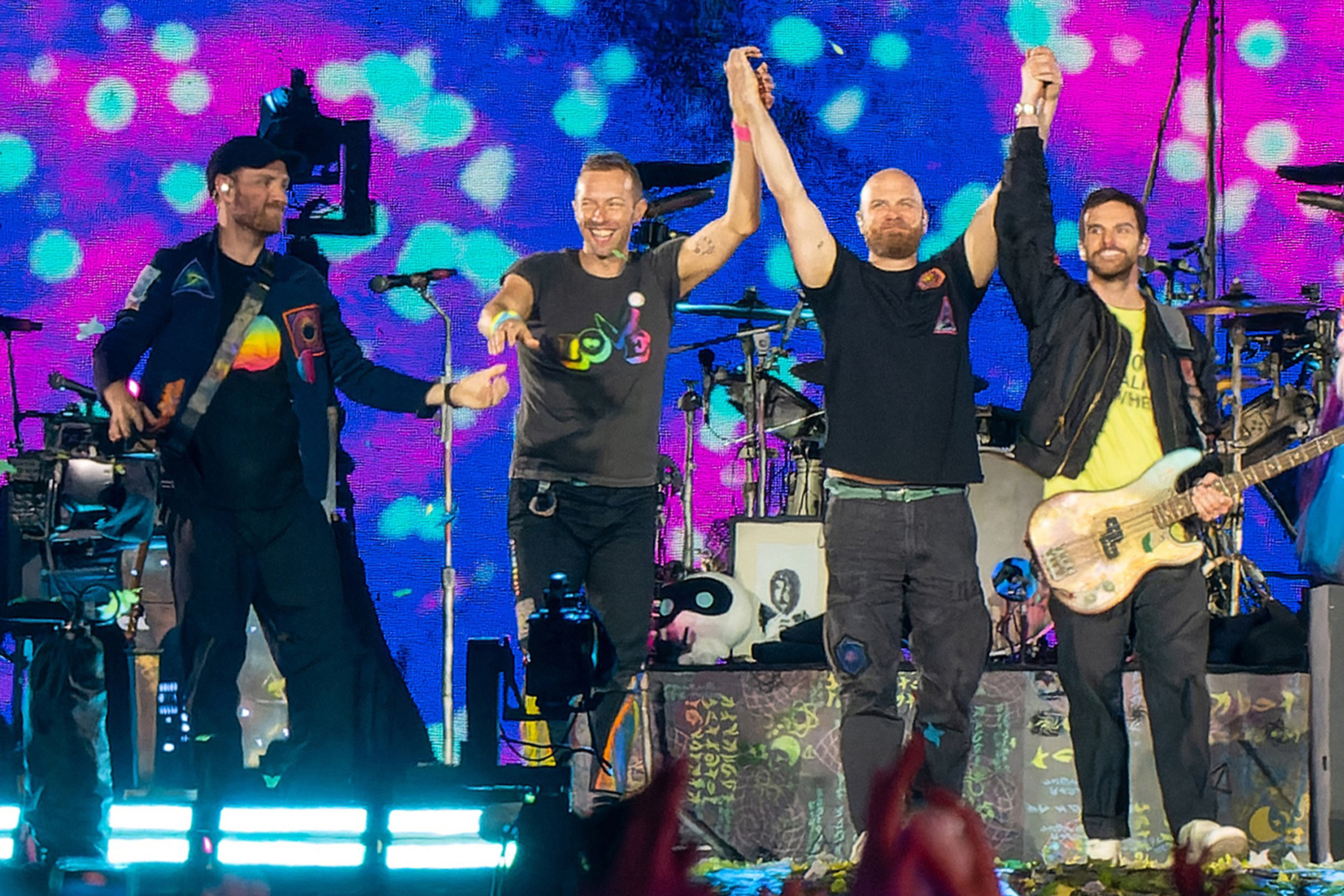
Coldplay earned the highest gross for a multi-day tour stop with their Wembley Stadium run in 2025

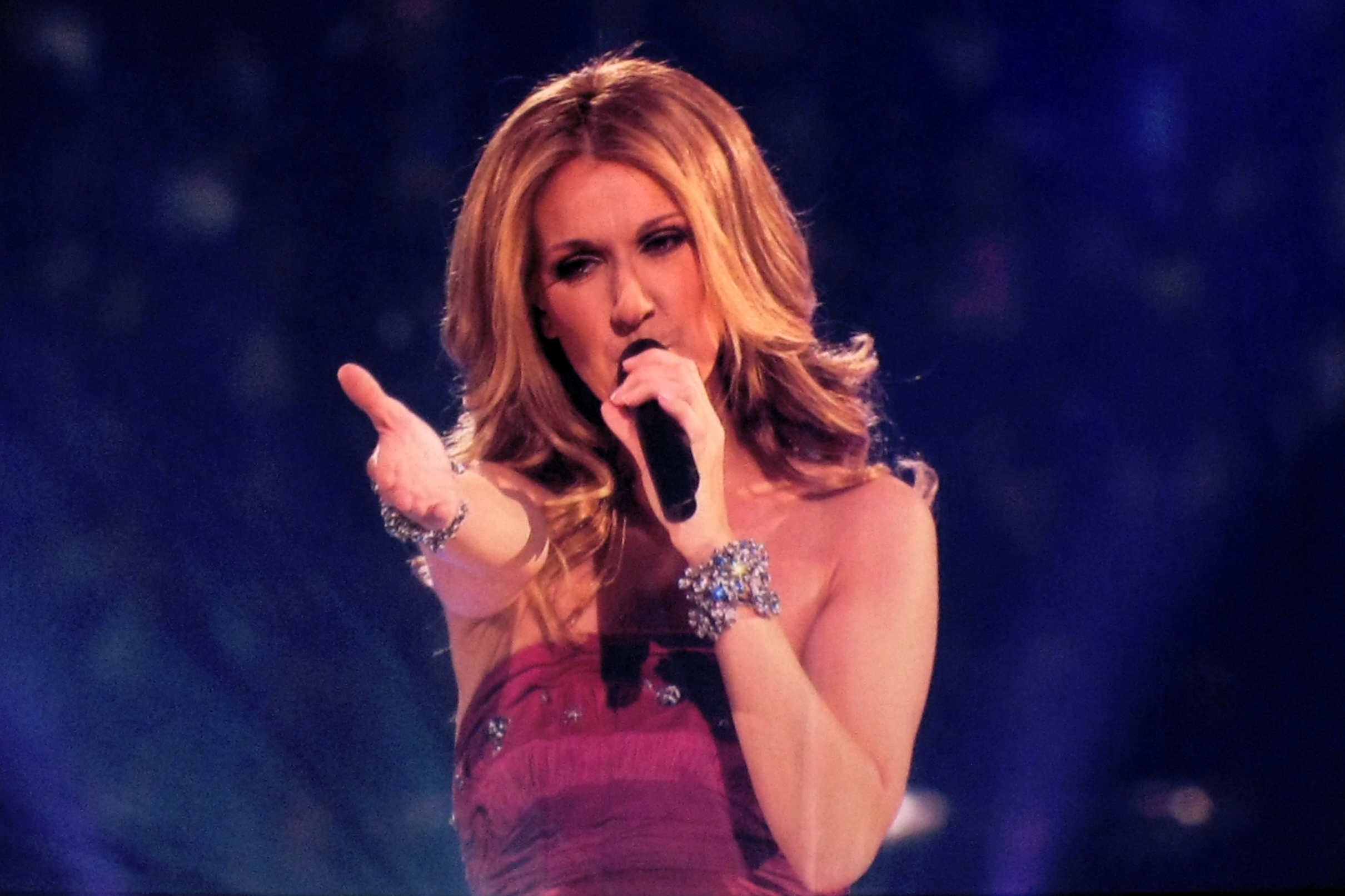
Celine Dion earned the highest gross for a residency with her New Day... shows from 2003 to 2007

The following is a list of the highest-grossing concert series at a single venue (excluding music festivals). A run of concerts at the same venue may be promoted either as a standalone residency or as a multi-day stop from a larger concert tour. Both Pollstar and Billboard have defined residencies as 10 shows or more at a single location. However, Billboard omits all "mini-residencies within a tour" from its rankings, favoring events that established independent names, productions and set lists.

Bruce Springsteen and the E Street Band are the earliest known musicians to gross over $35 million on a multi-day tour stop. They performed a 10-concert run at Giants Stadium in 2003, yielding $38.6 million. In 2011, Take That broke their record twice: the first time with eight dates at Etihad Stadium ($44.1 million) and the second with eight dates at Wembley Stadium ($62.8 million). Harry Styles eclipsed them by holding 15 performances at Madison Square Garden in 2022, registering a $63.1 million total.

Beyoncé was the first woman to report earnings above $30 million. Her five shows at Tottenham Hotspur Stadium were estimated to generate $38.9 million in 2023. Two years later, she played five concerts at MetLife Stadium, drawing $70.2 million to beat Styles. Also in 2025, Shakira outdid both and grossed $76 million after 12 nights at Estadio GNP Seguros. Coldplay followed with $131.3 million from 10 dates at Wembley Stadium, which became the first run to exceed $100 million.

Celine Dion is the top earner among residency performers, grossing $681 million across the New Day... (2003–2007) and Celine (2011–2019) series. Most residencies are staged at theaters in the Las Vegas Valley because of its popularity as a tourist destination, though artists such as Billy Joel and Springsteen have launched events based in New York City. Joel's At the Garden (2014–2024) is the leading residency by a male solo act, while U2:UV Achtung Baby Live at Sphere (2023–2024) holds the record among bands.

== Multi-day tour stops ==
Key
*	Indicates the multi-day tour stop had grossed the most revenue up to that point

Multi-day tour stops with over $35 million in revenue
Rank	Actual gross	Adjusted gross (in 2025 dollars)	Artist	Venue	Tour title	Year	Shows	Ref.
1	$131,389,430	$131,389,430	Coldplay	Wembley Stadium	Music of the Spheres World Tour *	2025	10	
2	$96,064,246	$96,064,246	Bad Bunny	Metropolitano Stadium	Debí Tirar Más Fotos World Tour	2026	10	
3	$89,106,148	$89,106,148	Shakira	Shakira Stadium	Las Mujeres Ya No Lloran World Tour	2026	13	
4	$88,049,427	$88,049,427	Bad Bunny	Estadio GNP Seguros	Debí Tirar Más Fotos World Tour	2025	8	
5	$76,018,118	$76,018,118	Shakira	Estadio GNP Seguros	Las Mujeres Ya No Lloran World Tour *	2025	12	(Note: The first 11 shows grossed $70.7 million, while the twelfth added $5.25 million to the total after Shakira was topped by Coldplay.)
6	$70,284,615	$70,284,615	Beyoncé	MetLife Stadium	Cowboy Carter Tour *	2025	5	
7	$66,552,088	$66,552,088	BTS	Allegiant Stadium	Arirang World Tour	2026	4	
8	$63,102,676	$69,424,425	Harry Styles	Madison Square Garden	Love On Tour *	2022	15	
9	$62,823,259	$88,324,712	Take That	Wembley Stadium	Progress Live *	2011	8	
10	$61,580,067	$61,580,067	Beyoncé	Tottenham Hotspur Stadium	Cowboy Carter Tour	2025	6	
11	$57,700,000	$57,700,000	BTS	SoFi Stadium	Arirang World Tour	2026	4	
12	$55,706,053	$55,706,053	Beyoncé	SoFi Stadium	Cowboy Carter Tour	2025	5	
13	$55,424,228	$55,424,228	Beyoncé	Mercedes-Benz Stadium	Cowboy Carter Tour	2025	4	
14	$49,695,814	$54,674,437	Coldplay	Estadio River Plate	Music of the Spheres World Tour	2022	10	
15	$49,520,804	$50,823,568	Coldplay	Croke Park	Music of the Spheres World Tour	2024	4	
16	$49,209,920	$54,139,865	Coldplay	Wembley Stadium	Music of the Spheres World Tour	2022	6	
17	$47,755,551	$50,462,533	Harry Styles	Kia Forum	Love On Tour	2022	15	(Note: Styles rescheduled three out of the 15 shows for 2023 due to illness.)
18	$45,540,402	$48,121,821	Beyoncé	SoFi Stadium	Renaissance World Tour	2023	3	
19	$44,183,145	$63,235,492	Take That	Etihad Stadium	Progress Live *	2011	8	
20	$43,489,631	$44,633,731	Bruno Mars	Tokyo Dome	Bruno Mars Live	2024	7	
21	$43,477,766	$43,477,766	BTS	Estadio GNP Seguros	Arirang World Tour	2026	3	
22	$43,362,248	$44,502,997	Coldplay	Singapore National Stadium	Music of the Spheres World Tour	2024	6	
23	$42,523,825	$42,523,825	Beyoncé	Soldier Field	Cowboy Carter Tour	2025	3	
24	$40,809,884	$40,809,884	Lady Gaga	Singapore National Stadium	Lion City Mayhem	2025	4	
25	$40,736,442	$40,736,442	BTS	Raymond James Stadium	Arirang World Tour	2026	3	
26	$40,104,881	$42,378,192	Coldplay	Estádio do Morumbi	Music of the Spheres World Tour	2023	6	
27	$39,849,890	$42,108,747	Beyoncé	Mercedes-Benz Stadium	Renaissance World Tour	2023	3	
28	$39,719,132	$39,719,132	Beyoncé	Stade de France	Cowboy Carter Tour	2025	3	
29	$38,986,169	$41,196,067	Beyoncé	Tottenham Hotspur Stadium	Renaissance World Tour	2023	5	
30	$38,684,050	$67,704,085	Bruce Springsteen · E Street Band	Giants Stadium	The Rising Tour *	2003	10	
31	$38,437,649	$42,288,407	Ed Sheeran	Wembley Stadium	+−=÷× Tour	2022	5	
32	$37,970,877	$53,249,491	Roger Waters	Estadio River Plate	The Wall Live	2012	9	
33	$37,848,426	$38,844,120	Coldplay	Accor Stadium	Music of the Spheres World Tour	2024	4	
34	$37,341,665	$39,458,345	Harry Styles	Wembley Stadium	Love On Tour	2023	4	
35	$35,944,850	$39,545,875	BTS	Allegiant Stadium	Permission to Dance on Stage	2022	4	

== Concert residencies ==
Key
*	Indicates the residency had grossed the most revenue up to that point
†	Indicates an ongoing residency

Residencies with over $100 million in revenue
Rank	Actual gross	Adjusted gross (in 2025 dollars)	Artist	Venue	Residency title	Year	Shows	Ref.
1	$385,100,000	$597,952,576	Celine Dion	The Colosseum at Caesars Palace	A New Day... *	2003–2007	714	
2	$296,200,000	$372,996,876	Celine Dion	The Colosseum at Caesars Palace	Celine	2011–2019	427	
3	$288,900,000	$288,900,000	Eagles	Sphere	Live in Concert at Sphere †	2024–2025	60	
4	$266,800,000	$273,818,818	Billy Joel	Madison Square Garden	Billy Joel at the Garden	2014–2024	104	
5	$244,478,903	$250,910,511	U2	Sphere	U2:UV Achtung Baby Live at Sphere	2023–2024	40	
6	$198,900,000	$198,900,000	Dead & Company	Sphere	Dead Forever: Live at Sphere	2024–2025	48	
7	$197,261,497	$197,261,497	Bruno Mars	Dolby Live	Bruno Mars at Park MGM	2016–2025	110	
8	$166,400,000	$249,716,147	Elton John	The Colosseum at Caesars Palace	The Red Piano	2004–2009	248	
9	$156,400,000	$156,400,000	Backstreet Boys	Sphere	Into the Millennium †	2025–2026	56	
10	$137,700,000	$137,700,000	Garth Brooks	The Colosseum at Caesars Palace	Garth Brooks/Plus One	2023–2025	72	
11	$137,695,392	$180,858,392	Britney Spears	Zappos Theater	Piece of Me	2013–2017	248	
12	$131,200,000	$168,216,274	Elton John	The Colosseum at Caesars Palace	The Million Dollar Piano	2011–2018	189	
13	$125,500,000	$125,500,000	Celine Dion	Plenitude Arena	Celine Dion Paris †	2026–2027	16	
14	$113,058,952	$144,956,979	Bruce Springsteen	Walter Kerr Theatre	Springsteen on Broadway	2017–2018	236	
15	$110,041,261	$112,936,162	Lady Gaga	Dolby Live	Enigma + Jazz & Piano	2018–2024	72	
16	$101,900,000	$130,649,682	Jennifer Lopez	Zappos Theater	All I Have	2016–2018	120	

== See also ==
- List of highest-grossing live music artists
- List of highest-grossing benefit concerts
- List of most-attended concert tours
- List of most-attended concert series at a single venue
- List of most-attended concerts
