= The Red Piano =

2004–09 concert residency by Elton John

- Residency by Elton John
- Billboard of the red piano
- Location: Paradise, Nevada, U.S.
- Venue: The Colosseum at Caesars Palace
- Start date: 13 February 2004
- End date: 22 April 2009
- Legs: 22
- No. of shows: 46 in 2004; 44 in 2005; 48 in 2006; 38 in 2007; 50 in 2008; 21 in 2009; 247 in total

Elton John concert chronology
- The Red Piano (2004–09); The Million Dollar Piano (2011–18)

The Red Piano was a concert residency by English singer-songwriter Elton John. It took place at The Colosseum at Caesars Palace on the Las Vegas Strip in Paradise, Nevada from 2004 to 2009. The idea for the show was conceived in 2004 by John and David LaChapelle.

== Show ==
The Red Piano was originally scheduled to be 75 shows over three years, but ended up being 247 shows over six years. John ended his residency at the Colosseum on 22 April 2009. The show was replaced by Cher's Cher at the Colosseum and Bette Midler's The Showgirl Must Go On.

== Set list ==
1. "Bennie and the Jets"
2. "Philadelphia Freedom"
3. "Believe"
4. "Daniel"
5. "Rocket Man"
6. "I Guess That's Why They Call It the Blues"
7. "I'm Still Standing"
8. "I Want Love"
9. "Tiny Dancer"
10. "Don't Let the Sun Go Down on Me"
11. "The Bitch Is Back"
12. "Candle in the Wind"
13. "I Guess That's Why They Call It the Blues"
14. "Pinball Wizard"
15. "Saturday Night's Alright for Fighting"
16. "Your Song"

== Concert dates ==
Date	Attendance	Revenue
Leg 1
13 February 2004	32,682 / 32,682 (100%)	$6,415,950
14 February 2004	32,682 / 32,682 (100%)	$6,415,950
15 February 2004	32,682 / 32,682 (100%)	$6,415,950
17 February 2004	32,682 / 32,682 (100%)	$6,415,950
18 February 2004	32,682 / 32,682 (100%)	$6,415,950
20 February 2004	32,682 / 32,682 (100%)	$6,415,950
21 February 2004	32,682 / 32,682 (100%)	$6,415,950
22 February 2004	32,682 / 32,682 (100%)	$6,415,950
Leg 2
23 March 2004	43,594 / 43,594 (100%)	$8,137,425
24 March 2004	43,594 / 43,594 (100%)	$8,137,425
26 March 2004	43,594 / 43,594 (100%)	$8,137,425
27 March 2004	43,594 / 43,594 (100%)	$8,137,425
28 March 2004	43,594 / 43,594 (100%)	$8,137,425
30 March 2004	43,594 / 43,594 (100%)	$8,137,425
31 March 2004	43,594 / 43,594 (100%)	$8,137,425
2 April 2004	43,594 / 43,594 (100%)	$8,137,425
3 April 2004	43,594 / 43,594 (100%)	$8,137,425
4 April 2004	43,594 / 43,594 (100%)	$8,137,425
Leg 3
23 July 2004	55,354 / 55,354 (100%)	$9,133,410
24 July 2004	55,354 / 55,354 (100%)	$9,133,410
25 July 2004	55,354 / 55,354 (100%)	$9,133,410
27 July 2004	55,354 / 55,354 (100%)	$9,133,410
28 July 2004	55,354 / 55,354 (100%)	$9,133,410
30 July 2004	55,354 / 55,354 (100%)	$9,133,410
31 July 2004	55,354 / 55,354 (100%)	$9,133,410
1 August 2004	55,354 / 55,354 (100%)	$9,133,410
4 August 2004	55,354 / 55,354 (100%)	$9,133,410
5 August 2004	55,354 / 55,354 (100%)	$9,133,410
6 August 2004	55,354 / 55,354 (100%)	$9,133,410
7 August 2004	55,354 / 55,354 (100%)	$9,133,410
8 August 2004	55,354 / 55,354 (100%)	$9,133,410
Leg 4
12 October 2004	59,155 / 59,155 (100%)	$9,823,975
13 October 2004	59,155 / 59,155 (100%)	$9,823,975
15 October 2004	59,155 / 59,155 (100%)	$9,823,975
16 October 2004	59,155 / 59,155 (100%)	$9,823,975
17 October 2004	59,155 / 59,155 (100%)	$9,823,975
19 October 2004	59,155 / 59,155 (100%)	$9,823,975
20 October 2004	59,155 / 59,155 (100%)	$9,823,975
22 October 2004	59,155 / 59,155 (100%)	$9,823,975
23 October 2004	59,155 / 59,155 (100%)	$9,823,975
24 October 2004	59,155 / 59,155 (100%)	$9,823,975
26 October 2004	59,155 / 59,155 (100%)	$9,823,975
27 October 2004	59,155 / 59,155 (100%)	$9,823,975
29 October 2004	59,155 / 59,155 (100%)	$9,823,975
30 October 2004	59,155 / 59,155 (100%)	$9,823,975
31 October 2004	59,155 / 59,155 (100%)	$9,823,975
Leg 5
8 February 2005	53,455 / 53,455 (100%)	$9,570,725
9 February 2005	53,455 / 53,455 (100%)	$9,570,725
11 February 2005	53,455 / 53,455 (100%)	$9,570,725
12 February 2005	53,455 / 53,455 (100%)	$9,570,725
13 February 2005	53,455 / 53,455 (100%)	$9,570,725
15 February 2005	53,455 / 53,455 (100%)	$9,570,725
16 February 2005	53,455 / 53,455 (100%)	$9,570,725
18 February 2005	53,455 / 53,455 (100%)	$9,570,725
19 February 2005	53,455 / 53,455 (100%)	$9,570,725
20 February 2005	53,455 / 53,455 (100%)	$9,570,725
22 February 2005	53,455 / 53,455 (100%)	$9,570,725
23 February 2005	53,455 / 53,455 (100%)	$9,570,725
25 February 2005	53,455 / 53,455 (100%)	$9,570,725
26 February 2005	53,455 / 53,455 (100%)	$9,570,725
Leg 6
29 March 2005	40,353 / 40,353 (100%)	$7,324,725
30 March 2005	40,353 / 40,353 (100%)	$7,324,725
1 April 2005	40,353 / 40,353 (100%)	$7,324,725
2 April 2005	40,353 / 40,353 (100%)	$7,324,725
3 April 2005	40,353 / 40,353 (100%)	$7,324,725
5 April 2005	40,353 / 40,353 (100%)	$7,324,725
6 April 2005	40,353 / 40,353 (100%)	$7,324,725
8 April 2005	40,353 / 40,353 (100%)	$7,324,725
9 April 2005	40,353 / 40,353 (100%)	$7,324,725
10 April 2005	40,353 / 40,353 (100%)	$7,324,725
Leg 7
26 July 2005	19,443 / 19,443 (100%)	$3,384,500
27 July 2005	19,443 / 19,443 (100%)	$3,384,500
29 July 2005	19,443 / 19,443 (100%)	$3,384,500
30 July 2005	19,443 / 19,443 (100%)	$3,384,500
31 July 2005	19,443 / 19,443 (100%)	$3,384,500
Leg 8
4 October 2005	58,533 / 58,533 (100%)	$10,315,000
5 October 2005	58,533 / 58,533 (100%)	$10,315,000
7 October 2005	58,533 / 58,533 (100%)	$10,315,000
8 October 2005	58,533 / 58,533 (100%)	$10,315,000
9 October 2005	58,533 / 58,533 (100%)	$10,315,000
11 October 2005	58,533 / 58,533 (100%)	$10,315,000
12 October 2005	58,533 / 58,533 (100%)	$10,315,000
14 October 2005	58,533 / 58,533 (100%)	$10,315,000
15 October 2005	58,533 / 58,533 (100%)	$10,315,000
16 October 2005	58,533 / 58,533 (100%)	$10,315,000
18 October 2005	58,533 / 58,533 (100%)	$10,315,000
19 October 2005	58,533 / 58,533 (100%)	$10,315,000
21 October 2005	58,533 / 58,533 (100%)	$10,315,000
22 October 2005	58,533 / 58,533 (100%)	$10,315,000
23 October 2005	58,533 / 58,533 (100%)	$10,315,000
Leg 9
31 January 2006	49,043 / 49,043 (100%)	$8,679,025
1 February 2006	49,043 / 49,043 (100%)	$8,679,025
3 February 2006	49,043 / 49,043 (100%)	$8,679,025
4 February 2006	49,043 / 49,043 (100%)	$8,679,025
7 February 2006	49,043 / 49,043 (100%)	$8,679,025
10 February 2006	49,043 / 49,043 (100%)	$8,679,025
11 February 2006	49,043 / 49,043 (100%)	$8,679,025
12 February 2006	49,043 / 49,043 (100%)	$8,679,025
14 February 2006	49,043 / 49,043 (100%)	$8,679,025
15 February 2006	49,043 / 49,043 (100%)	$8,679,025
17 February 2006	49,043 / 49,043 (100%)	$8,679,025
18 February 2006	49,043 / 49,043 (100%)	$8,679,025
19 February 2006	49,043 / 49,043 (100%)	$8,679,025
Leg 10
28 March 2006	40,026 / 40,026 (100%)	$6,642,075
29 March 2006	40,026 / 40,026 (100%)	$6,642,075
31 March 2006	40,026 / 40,026 (100%)	$6,642,075
1 April 2006	40,026 / 40,026 (100%)	$6,642,075
2 April 2006	40,026 / 40,026 (100%)	$6,642,075
4 April 2006	40,026 / 40,026 (100%)	$6,642,075
5 April 2006	40,026 / 40,026 (100%)	$6,642,075
7 April 2006	40,026 / 40,026 (100%)	$6,642,075
8 April 2006	40,026 / 40,026 (100%)	$6,642,075
9 April 2006	40,026 / 40,026 (100%)	$6,642,075
Leg 11
11 July 2006	60,045 / 60,045 (100%)	$10,507,875
12 July 2006	60,045 / 60,045 (100%)	$10,507,875
14 July 2006	60,045 / 60,045 (100%)	$10,507,875
15 July 2006	60,045 / 60,045 (100%)	$10,507,875
16 July 2006	60,045 / 60,045 (100%)	$10,507,875
18 July 2006	60,045 / 60,045 (100%)	$10,507,875
19 July 2006	60,045 / 60,045 (100%)	$10,507,875
21 July 2006	60,045 / 60,045 (100%)	$10,507,875
22 July 2006	60,045 / 60,045 (100%)	$10,507,875
23 July 2006	60,045 / 60,045 (100%)	$10,507,875
25 July 2006	60,045 / 60,045 (100%)	$10,507,875
26 July 2006	60,045 / 60,045 (100%)	$10,507,875
28 July 2006	60,045 / 60,045 (100%)	$10,507,875
29 July 2006	60,045 / 60,045 (100%)	$10,507,875
30 July 2006	60,045 / 60,045 (100%)	$10,507,875
Leg 12
10 October 2006	40,462 / 40,462 (100%)	$7,200,175
11 October 2006	40,462 / 40,462 (100%)	$7,200,175
13 October 2006	40,462 / 40,462 (100%)	$7,200,175
14 October 2006	40,462 / 40,462 (100%)	$7,200,175
15 October 2006	40,462 / 40,462 (100%)	$7,200,175
17 October 2006	40,462 / 40,462 (100%)	$7,200,175
18 October 2006	40,462 / 40,462 (100%)	$7,200,175
20 October 2006	40,462 / 40,462 (100%)	$7,200,175
21 October 2006	40,462 / 40,462 (100%)	$7,200,175
22 October 2006	40,462 / 40,462 (100%)	$7,200,175
Leg 13
30 January 2007	48,552 / 48,552 (100%)	$8,496,600
31 January 2007	48,552 / 48,552 (100%)	$8,496,600
2 February 2007	48,552 / 48,552 (100%)	$8,496,600
3 February 2007	48,552 / 48,552 (100%)	$8,496,600
6 February 2007	48,552 / 48,552 (100%)	$8,496,600
7 February 2007	48,552 / 48,552 (100%)	$8,496,600
9 February 2007	48,552 / 48,552 (100%)	$8,496,600
10 February 2007	48,552 / 48,552 (100%)	$8,496,600
11 February 2007	48,552 / 48,552 (100%)	$8,496,600
13 February 2007	48,552 / 48,552 (100%)	$8,496,600
14 February 2007	48,552 / 48,552 (100%)	$8,496,600
17 February 2007	48,552 / 48,552 (100%)	$8,496,600
Leg 14
27 March 2007	32,368 / 32,368 (100%)	$5,664,400
28 March 2007	32,368 / 32,368 (100%)	$5,664,400
30 March 2007	32,368 / 32,368 (100%)	$5,664,400
31 March 2007	32,368 / 32,368 (100%)	$5,664,400
3 April 2007	32,368 / 32,368 (100%)	$5,664,400
6 April 2007	32,368 / 32,368 (100%)	$5,664,400
7 April 2007	32,368 / 32,368 (100%)	$5,664,400
10 April 2007	32,368 / 32,368 (100%)	$5,664,400
Leg 15
8 May 2007	19,387 / 19,387 (100%)	$3,185,700
9 May 2007	19,387 / 19,387 (100%)	$3,185,700
11 May 2007	19,387 / 19,387 (100%)	$3,185,700
12 May 2007	19,387 / 19,387 (100%)	$3,185,700
13 May 2007	19,387 / 19,387 (100%)	$3,185,700
Leg 16
16 October 2007	52,598 / 52,598 (100%)	$9,204,650
18 October 2007	52,598 / 52,598 (100%)	$9,204,650
19 October 2007	52,598 / 52,598 (100%)	$9,204,650
20 October 2007	52,598 / 52,598 (100%)	$9,204,650
22 October 2007	52,598 / 52,598 (100%)	$9,204,650
25 October 2007	52,598 / 52,598 (100%)	$9,204,650
26 October 2007	52,598 / 52,598 (100%)	$9,204,650
27 October 2007	52,598 / 52,598 (100%)	$9,204,650
29 October 2007	52,598 / 52,598 (100%)	$9,204,650
30 October 2007	52,598 / 52,598 (100%)	$9,204,650
2 November 2007	52,598 / 52,598 (100%)	$9,204,650
3 November 2007	52,598 / 52,598 (100%)	$9,204,650
5 November 2007	52,598 / 52,598 (100%)	$9,204,650
Leg 17
19 March 2008	56,644 / 56,644 (100%)	$9,912,700
21 March 2008	56,644 / 56,644 (100%)	$9,912,700
22 March 2008	56,644 / 56,644 (100%)	$9,912,700
24 March 2008	56,644 / 56,644 (100%)	$9,912,700
25 March 2008	56,644 / 56,644 (100%)	$9,912,700
26 March 2008	56,644 / 56,644 (100%)	$9,912,700
28 March 2008	56,644 / 56,644 (100%)	$9,912,700
29 March 2008	56,644 / 56,644 (100%)	$9,912,700
31 March 2008	56,644 / 56,644 (100%)	$9,912,700
1 April 2008	56,644 / 56,644 (100%)	$9,912,700
2 April 2008	56,644 / 56,644 (100%)	$9,912,700
4 April 2008	56,644 / 56,644 (100%)	$9,912,700
5 April 2008	56,644 / 56,644 (100%)	$9,912,700
6 April 2008	56,644 / 56,644 (100%)	$9,912,700
Leg 18
3 June 2008	62,235 / 62,235 (100%)	$10,891,125
4 June 2008	62,235 / 62,235 (100%)	$10,891,125
6 June 2008	62,235 / 62,235 (100%)	$10,891,125
7 June 2008	62,235 / 62,235 (100%)	$10,891,125
9 June 2008	62,235 / 62,235 (100%)	$10,891,125
10 June 2008	62,235 / 62,235 (100%)	$10,891,125
11 June 2008	62,235 / 62,235 (100%)	$10,891,125
13 June 2008	62,235 / 62,235 (100%)	$10,891,125
14 June 2008	62,235 / 62,235 (100%)	$10,891,125
16 June 2008	62,235 / 62,235 (100%)	$10,891,125
17 June 2008	62,235 / 62,235 (100%)	$10,891,125
18 June 2008	62,235 / 62,235 (100%)	$10,891,125
20 June 2008	62,235 / 62,235 (100%)	$10,891,125
21 June 2008	62,235 / 62,235 (100%)	$10,891,125
22 June 2008	62,235 / 62,235 (100%)	$10,891,125
Leg 19
23 July 2008	33,192 / 33,192 (100%)	$5,808,600
24 July 2008	33,192 / 33,192 (100%)	$5,808,600
25 July 2008	33,192 / 33,192 (100%)	$5,808,600
26 July 2008	33,192 / 33,192 (100%)	$5,808,600
30 July 2008	33,192 / 33,192 (100%)	$5,808,600
31 July 2008	33,192 / 33,192 (100%)	$5,808,600
1 August 2008	33,192 / 33,192 (100%)	$5,808,600
2 August 2008	33,192 / 33,192 (100%)	$5,808,600
Leg 20
22 October 2008	50,420 / 52,546 (96%)	$7,606,820
23 October 2008	50,420 / 52,546 (96%)	$7,606,820
24 October 2008	50,420 / 52,546 (96%)	$7,606,820
25 October 2008	50,420 / 52,546 (96%)	$7,606,820
29 October 2008	50,420 / 52,546 (96%)	$7,606,820
30 October 2008	50,420 / 52,546 (96%)	$7,606,820
31 October 2008	50,420 / 52,546 (96%)	$7,606,820
1 November 2008	50,420 / 52,546 (96%)	$7,606,820
3 November 2008	50,420 / 52,546 (96%)	$7,606,820
6 November 2008	50,420 / 52,546 (96%)	$7,606,820
7 November 2008	50,420 / 52,546 (96%)	$7,606,820
8 November 2008	50,420 / 52,546 (96%)	$7,606,820
9 November 2008	50,420 / 52,546 (96%)	$7,606,820
Leg 21
3 February 2009	37,538 / 39,625 (95%)	$5,365,772
4 February 2009	37,538 / 39,625 (95%)	$5,365,772
6 February 2009	37,538 / 39,625 (95%)	$5,365,772
7 February 2009	37,538 / 39,625 (95%)	$5,365,772
8 February 2009	37,538 / 39,625 (95%)	$5,365,772
10 February 2009	37,538 / 39,625 (95%)	$5,365,772
11 February 2009	37,538 / 39,625 (95%)	$5,365,772
13 February 2009	37,538 / 39,625 (95%)	$5,365,772
14 February 2009	37,538 / 39,625 (95%)	$5,365,772
15 February 2009	37,538 / 39,625 (95%)	$5,365,772
Leg 22
8 March 2009	43,935 / 45,390 (97%)	$6,390,578
10 March 2009	43,935 / 45,390 (97%)	$6,390,578
11 March 2009	43,935 / 45,390 (97%)	$6,390,578
12 March 2009	43,935 / 45,390 (97%)	$6,390,578
14 March 2009	43,935 / 45,390 (97%)	$6,390,578
15 March 2009	43,935 / 45,390 (97%)	$6,390,578
16 March 2009	43,935 / 45,390 (97%)	$6,390,578
18 March 2009	43,935 / 45,390 (97%)	$6,390,578
19 March 2009	43,935 / 45,390 (97%)	$6,390,578
21 March 2009	43,935 / 45,390 (97%)	$6,390,578
22 March 2009	43,935 / 45,390 (97%)	$6,390,578
Total	989,004 / 994,682 (99%)	$169,661,805

=== Cancellations and rescheduled shows ===
16 February 2005	Cancelled
30 July 2006	Cancelled
1 April 2007	Cancelled
4 April 2007	Cancelled
8 April 2007	Cancelled

== The Red Piano: Live in Europe ==
The Red Piano: Live in Europe
- Tour by Elton John
- Location: Europe
- Start date: 5 September 2007
- End date: 20 October 2009
- Legs: 3
- No. of shows: 24

The Red Piano: Live in Europe was a concert tour by Elton John taking place between 2007 and 2009. The tour was the same as his Las Vegas Residency.

=== Background ===
Six European concerts taking place across summer 2007 were announced, then cancelled several months later. The cancellation was due to issues with the tour's promoter.

The first concert of The Red Piano: Live in Europe to take place was announced in June 2007, taking place at London's O2 Arena. The concert was given a four-star review by The Guardian newspaper.

=== Set list ===
This set list is representative of the performance on 20 October 2009 in Barcelona, Spain. It does not represent all concerts for the duration of the tour.

1. "Bennie and the Jets"
2. "Philadelphia Freedom"
3. "Believe"
4. "Daniel"
5. "Rocket Man"
6. "I Guess That's Why They Call It the Blues"
7. "Someone Saved My Life Tonight"
8. "Goodbye Yellow Brick Road"
9. "Nikita"
10. "Tiny Dancer"
11. "Don't Let the Sun Go Down on Me"
12. "Sorry Seems to Be the Hardest Word"
13. "Candle in the Wind"
  Encore
14. "Pinball Wizard"
15. "The Bitch Is Back"
16. "I'm Still Standing"
17. "Saturday Night's Alright for Fighting"
  Encore
18. "Your Song"

=== Tour dates ===
Date	City	Country	Venue	Attendance	Revenue
5 September 2007	London	England	The O_{2} Arena	—N/a	—N/a
19 November 2008	Birmingham	England	National Indoor Arena	—N/a	—N/a
22 November 2008	Munich	Germany	Olympiahalle	—N/a	—N/a
24 November 2008	Hamburg	Germany	Color Line Arena	—N/a	—N/a
26 November 2008	Cologne	Germany	Kölnarena	—N/a	—N/a
29 November 2008	Copenhagen	Denmark	Parken Stadium	—N/a	—N/a
4 December 2008	Stockholm	Sweden	Globe Arena	—N/a	—N/a
5 December 2008	Oslo	Norway	Oslo Spektrum	—N/a	—N/a
9 December 2008	Paris	France	Palais Omnisports de Paris-Bercy	—N/a	—N/a
11 December 2008	Berlin	Germany	O_{2} World Berlin	—N/a	—N/a
13 December 2008	London	England	The O_{2} Arena	—N/a	—N/a
16 December 2008	Birmingham	England	National Indoor Arena	—N/a	—N/a
17 December 2008	Liverpool	England	Echo Arena Liverpool	—N/a	—N/a
18 December 2008	Liverpool	England	Echo Arena Liverpool	—N/a	—N/a
20 December 2008	Manchester	England	Manchester Evening News Arena	—N/a	—N/a
21 December 2008	Manchester	England	Manchester Evening News Arena	—N/a	—N/a
31 December 2008	London	England	The O_{2} Arena	—N/a	—N/a
7 October 2009	Moscow	Russia	Olimpiyskiy	—N/a	—N/a
10 October 2009 (Note: The 10 October 2009 concert in Helsinki was originally scheduled to take place on 1 December 2008.)	Helsinki	Finland	Hartwall Areena	7,194 / 9,096	$917,820
13 October 2009	Antwerp	Belgium	Sportpaleis	7,441 / 10,033	$981,861
15 October 2009	Düsseldorf	Germany	ISS Dome	—N/a	—N/a
16 October 2009	Zürich	Switzerland	Hallenstadion	—N/a	—N/a
17 October 2009	Rotterdam	Netherlands	Rotterdam Ahoy	—N/a	—N/a
20 October 2009	Barcelona	Spain	Palau Sant Jordi	15,759 / 17,960	$1,287,536
Total				30,394 / 37,089 (82%)	$3,187,217

=== Cancellations and rescheduled shows ===
List of cancelled concerts, showing date, city, country, venue and reason
Date	City	Country	Venue	Reason
18 May 2007	Seville	Spain	Plaza de España	Issues with tour's promoter.
20 May 2007	Vitoria-Gasteiz	Spain	Plaza de Toros de Vitoria-Gasteiz	Issues with tour's promoter.
29 May 2007	Versailles	France	Château de Versailles	Issues with tour's promoter.
5 June 2007	Venice	Italy	Piazza San Marco	Issues with tour's promoter.
6 June 2007	Venice	Italy	Piazza San Marco	Issues with tour's promoter.
22 June 2007	Berlin	Germany	Brandenburg Gate	Issues with tour's promoter.
3 July 2007	Moscow	Russia	Crocus City Hall	Issues with tour's promoter.
23 October 2009	Sheffield	England	Sheffield Arena	Illness.
24 October 2009	Newcastle	England	Metro Radio Arena	Illness.
27 October 2009	London	England	Wembley Arena	Illness.
28 October 2009	Liverpool	England	Echo Arena Liverpool	Illness.
30 October 2009	Dublin	Ireland	The O_{2}	Illness.

== Recordings ==
The Red Piano was filmed and released to many major retailers. It was released as a single DVD disc and a 2 DVD / 2 CD Package that was exclusive to Best Buy. It was released also as a single Blu-ray and a 1 Blu-ray / 2 CD Package. The single disc features the concert only while the package set features the concert, a one-hour documentary, and the complete concert on two CD's.

== See also ==
- List of highest-grossing concert series at a single venue
- List of most-attended concert series at a single venue
