= Concert residency =

Run of an artist's concerts at one location

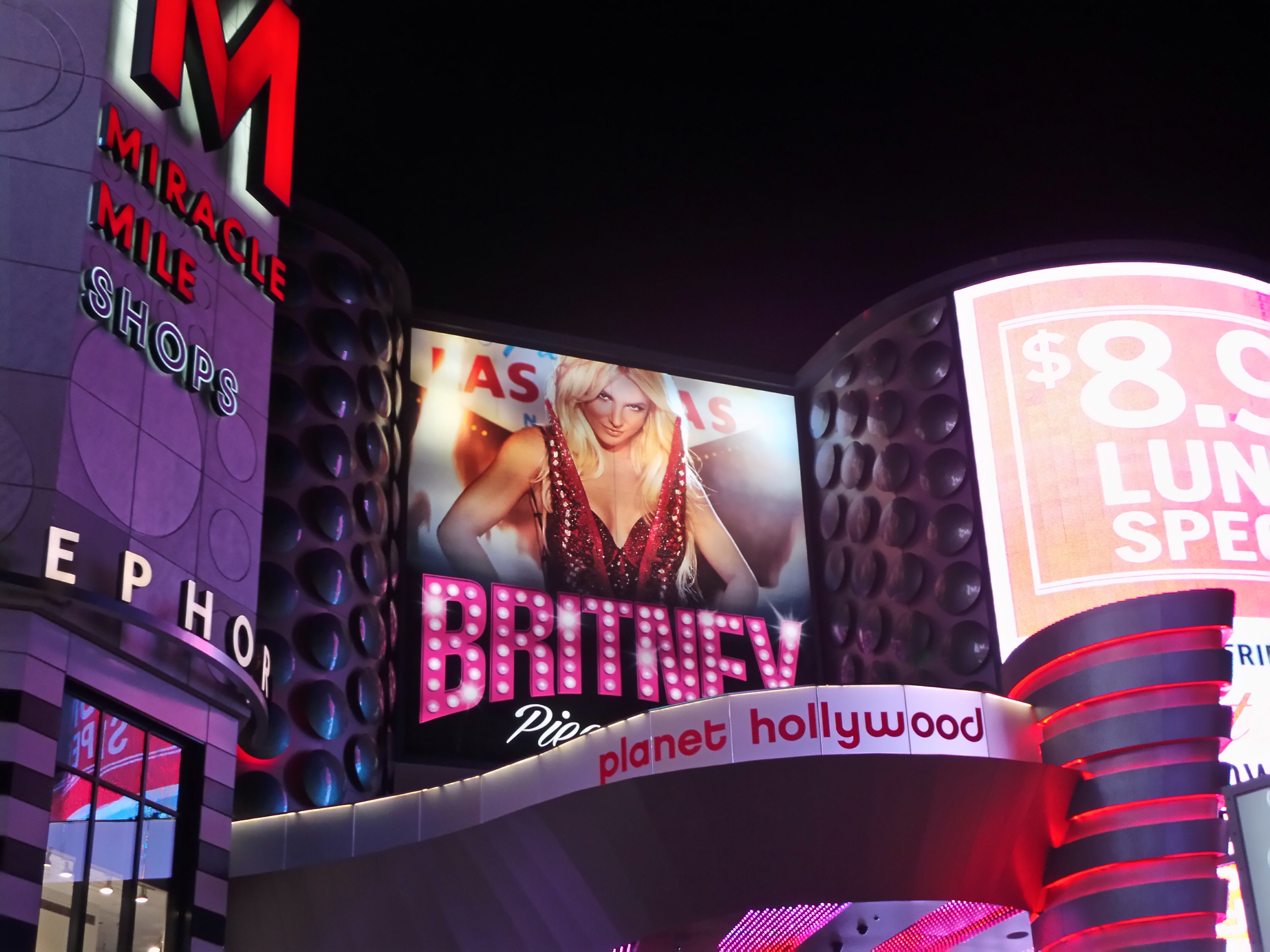
The venue of Britney Spears's concert residency at the Planet Hollywood Las Vegas

A concert residency, or simply residency, is a series of concerts, similar to a concert tour, but performed at only one location. Pollstar defines a residency as a series of 10 or more shows in one venue. An artist who performs on a concert residency is called a resident performer. Concert residencies have been the staple of the Las Vegas Strip for decades, pioneered by singer-pianist Liberace in 1955, followed by Frank Sinatra and other performers known as the Rat Pack.

Celine Dion's A New Day..., from 2003 to 2007, is the most successful concert residency of all time, grossing over US$385 million ($597.8 million in 2025 dollars) and drawing nearly three million people to 717 shows. The show's commercial success was credited with changing and revitalizing Las Vegas residencies, which previously had the negative perception of something that performers resorted to when their careers were in decline. Dion is further recognized as the "Queen of Las Vegas", a title formerly bestowed on Lola Falana, whose Vegas residency lasted over a decade.

== History ==
The concept of a concert residency was established by pianist and singer Liberace with a 1944 debut in Las Vegas, at the Dunes' Persian Room. Nearly ten years later, Liberace had his own show at the Riviera Hotel and Casino in Las Vegas, which reportedly earned "Mr. Showtime" around $50,000 per week. After years of pursuing other projects in Los Angeles, he returned to his Vegas residency and earned around $300,000 a week, until his death from AIDS-related complications in 1987.

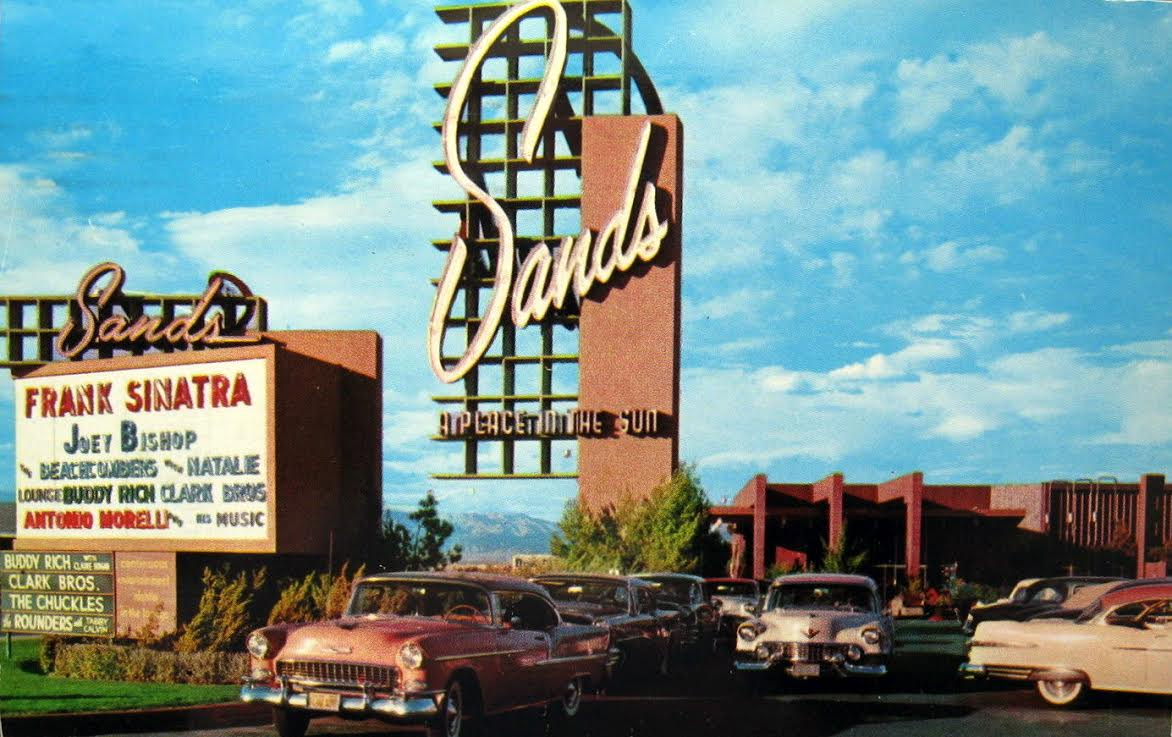
The Sands Hotel and Casino (1959), where Frank Sinatra was its headlining resident performer

Liberace's 1944 debut was followed by Frank Sinatra with the Rat Pack, as well as Elvis Presley. In April 1956, Presley began a two-week concert residency at the New Frontier Hotel and Casino, following the release of his self-titled debut album. His shows were poorly-received by the conservative, middle-aged hotel guests—"like a jug of corn liquor at a champagne party," wrote a critic for Newsweek. Nevertheless, between 1969 and 1976, Presley would perform 636 consecutive sold-out shows at the (formerly) Hilton Las Vegas, which has since been renamed the Westgate Las Vegas Resort & Casino. During the mid-1960s, The 5th Dimension's big break into stardom happened at Ceasars Palace during the mid-1960s, after which they became regular headliners on the Las Vegas Strip.

Kurt Melien, vice president of entertainment at Caesars Palace, explained that "Historically, Vegas residencies were more a loss leader event – famous artists playing in small showrooms just to draw in the gambling crowds." In the music world, Las Vegas was known as the place where singers went to "die"—if their careers hadn't suffered already—and where they could earn a comparatively meager wage in their "twilight" years, entertaining tourists on the Strip alongside magicians like David Copperfield, illusionists and Siegfried & Roy's tigers. Music journalist Jim Farber stated, "There used to be a certain element of cheesiness to playing in Vegas. I talked to Cher about that, and she referred to it as an 'elephant graveyard where talent goes to die' — and she was speaking of herself."

Celine Dion revitalized residencies in the 21st century, with the resounding success of her A New Day... residency between 2003 and 2007. In 2011, she would begin another successful run at Caesars Palace, with a contract through 2019. Her residencies introduced a new form of theatrical entertainment; with a fusion of song, choral ensemble, orchestral accompaniment, performance art, innovative stage craft, state-of-the-art technology, and even a tribute to her friend and idol, Michael Jackson, Dion managed to popularize the Las Vegas residency as a desirable way for top artists to essentially tour in place, letting their most dedicated fans come to them. Kurth Meline explained, "Céline was a pioneer without question. Twenty years ago, we couldn't have got someone the stature of Britney Spears to appear in Vegas. Stars like her would never have considered it if Céline hadn't paved the way. She changed the face of modern Vegas." Dion's second residency, Celine, saw her perform a record-breaking 1,000th show at The Colosseum on October 8, 2016, which she dedicated to the memory of her late husband and manager, Rene Angelil.

Since the 2010s, many other major performers have followed suit and accepted residency offers. This includes a variety of top acts, such as EDM DJs Tiësto and Calvin Harris, pop and R&B performers (including Adele, Jennifer Lopez, Diana Ross, Katy Perry, Usher, and Mariah Carey), and rock bands (such as Def Leppard and Aerosmith). Towards the end of the decade, there were even shows by hip hop acts such as Drake and Cardi B. By 2017, a tenth of Forbes Celebrity 100 had signed a residency contract in Las Vegas.

=== Residencies as part of tours ===
Due to high demands, some artists extend their touring schedule at a single venue, making it a "mini residency". In other case, after a successful standalone residency, an artist expands it into a multi-venue concert series. Mariah Carey's The Celebration of Mimi (2024–2025) started as a 24-show residency, then she added more international shows across Asia, Europe, and Latin America. Tours such as Madonna's Madame X Tour was conceived as a series of residencies in select cities. Harry Styles' 15 shows at the Madison Square Garden, as part of his Love On Tour, won the Pollstar Award for Residency of the Year.

List of longest-running residencies within a tour
Artist	Tour title	Venue	Shows	Year	Ref.
Luis Miguel	México Por Siempre Tour	Auditorio Nacional	35	2018	
Harry Styles	Together, Together	Madison Square Garden	30	2026	
Spice Girls	The Return of the Spice Girls Tour	The O2	17	2008	
Madonna	Madame X Tour	Howard Gilman Opera House	16	2019	

== Venue ==
For decades, Las Vegas has been the central destination for concert residencies. New York City has also grown as a residency destination, beginning with Billy Joel at Madison Square Garden in 2014. In 2022 Harry Styles performed 15 nights at Madison Square Garden from August 20 to September 21. American rock band Phish also performed a 13-show residency at the same venue, from July 21 to August 6, 2017. Bruce Springsteen held his 2017–18 residency, Springsteen on Broadway, at the Walter Kerr Theatre in New York City. In August and September 2007, the O2 Arena in London held a 21 concert series titled 21 Nights in London: The Earth Tour by Prince. From January to March 2009, Luis Miguel played a run of 25 shows at Auditorio Nacional in Mexico City. Michael Jackson had scheduled 50 concerts series titled This Is It from July 2009 to March 2010 at The O2 Arena in London, but they were cancelled due to his death. Mexican rock band Maná signed a residency at the LA Forum in Los Angeles, CA. "Maná: LA Residencia", exclusively at the venue starting March 2022.

== Box office ==
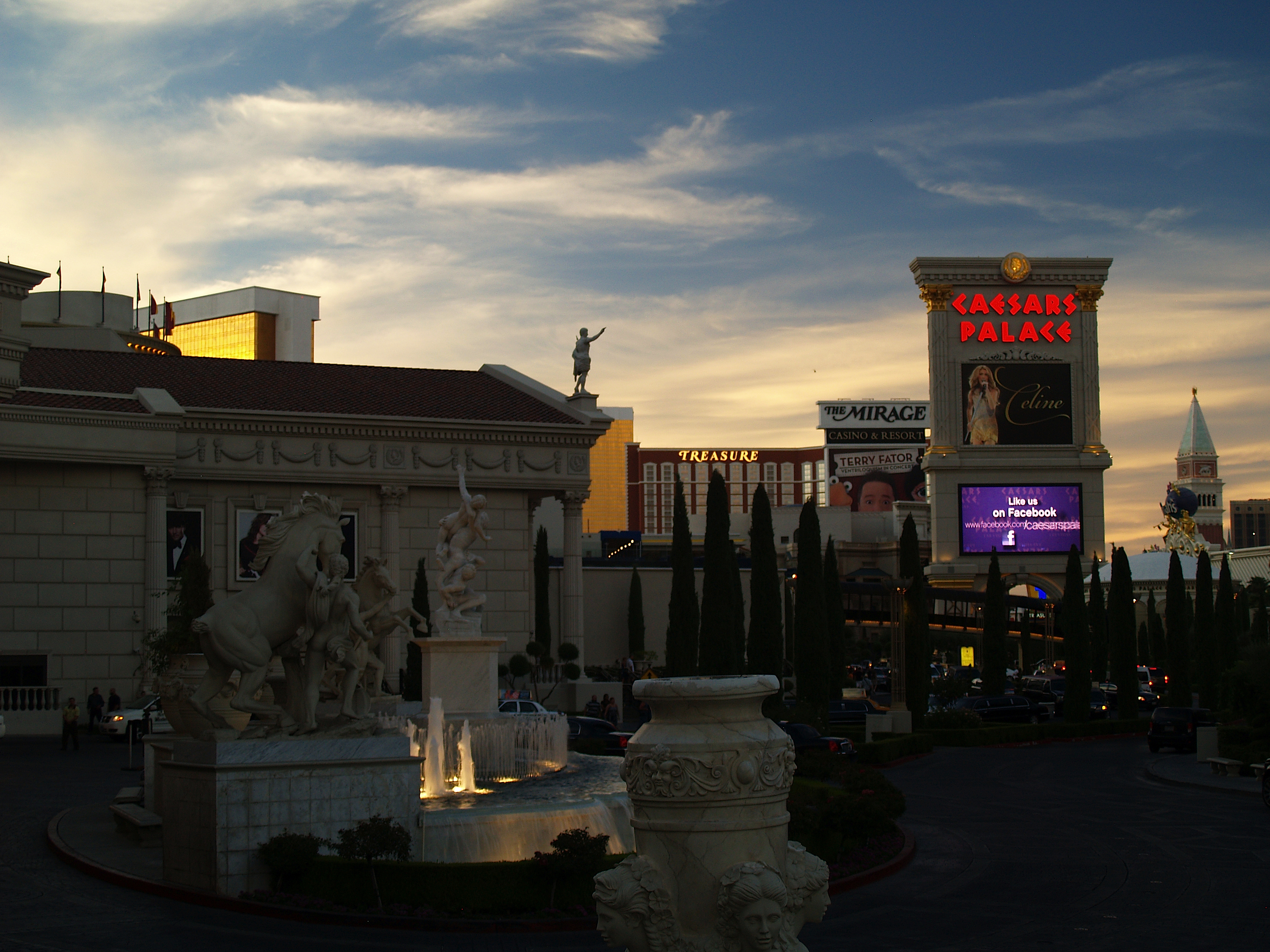
Celine Dion's residencies at The Colosseum at Caesars Palace generated $681 million, more than any other acts in history.

One of the most successful residencies in history was Elvis Presley's 636 consecutive shows at the International and Las Vegas Hilton from July 1969 through December 1976. However, the box-office data for his residency are unavailable. Celine Dion's A New Day... is the most successful concert residency of all time, grossing $385.1 million and drawing nearly three million people to 717 shows. Her second residency, Celine, is the second most successful one, generating $296 million from a total of 427 shows between 2011 and 2019. These two residencies made Dion the highest-grossing resident performer of all time.

Following Celine Dion, Elton John has become the second-most successful concert resident performer; his Red Piano residency grossed a reported $169 million between 2004 and 2009, and his Million Dollar Piano residency grossed $131 million between 2011 and 2018. Another top-selling residency was Britney Spears's Britney: Piece of Me, which began in December 2013 and ended in December 2017, grossing $137.7 million. From 2023 to 2024, U2 staged a residency called U2:UV Achtung Baby Live at Sphere, which grossed $244.5 million from just 40 shows; Billboard described it as the "fastest grossing residency in Boxscore history".

Outside of Las Vegas, Bruce Springsteen grossed over $113 million with 236 shows of his New York residency Springsteen on Broadway. Billy Joel grossed $266.8 million with his monthly residency at Madison Square Garden since 2014.
