= Jason Mraz discography =

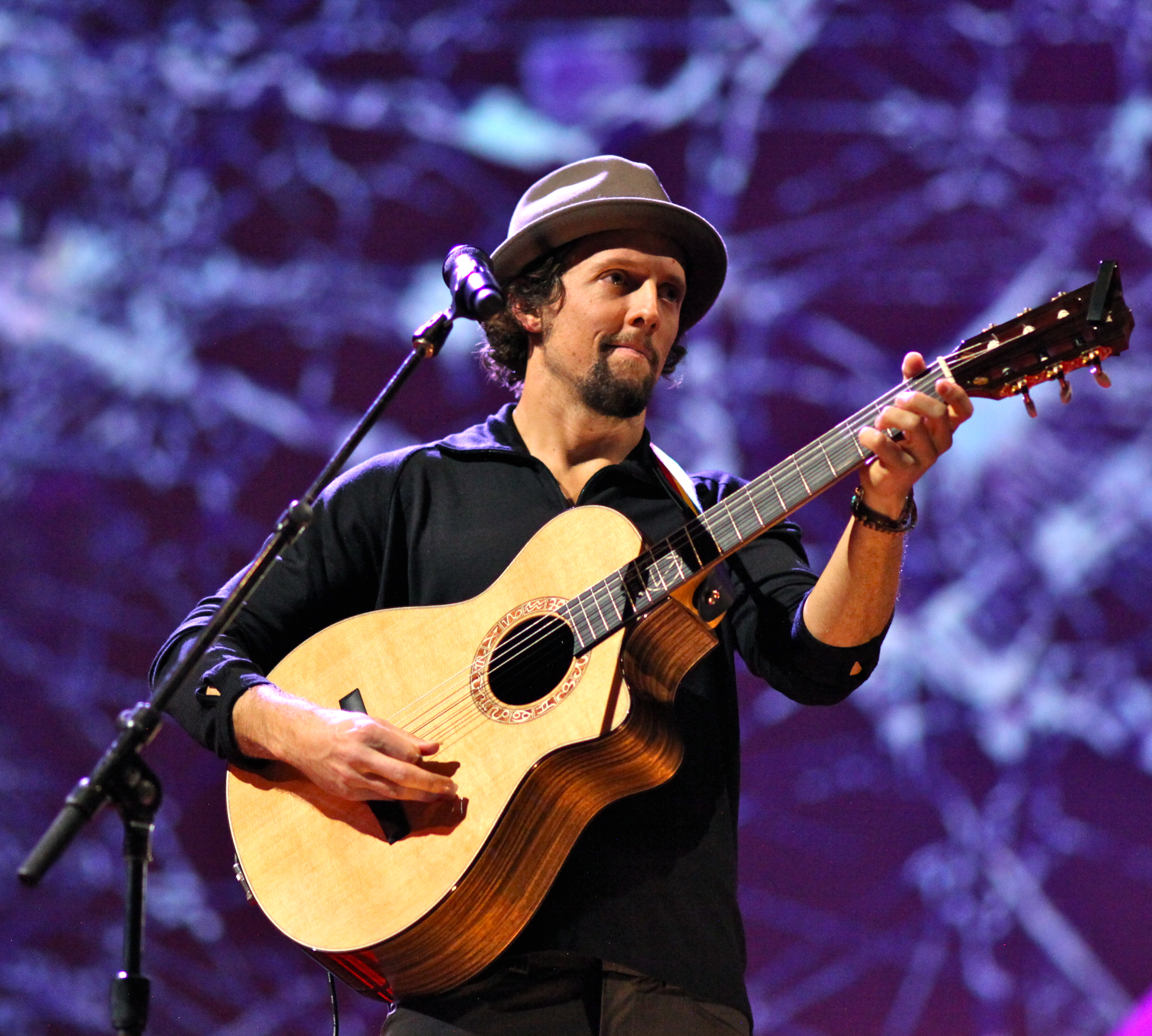
- Jason Mraz performing in March 2011
- Studio albums: 8
- Extended plays: 14
- Live albums: 5
- Compilation albums: 2
- Singles: 29
- Video albums: 1
- Music videos: 16
- Promotional singles: 8

The American singer Jason Mraz has released eight studio albums, five live albums, two compilation albums, one video album, fourteen extended plays, twenty-eight singles (including six as a featured artist), eight promotional singles and thirteen music videos. After various independent releases, Mraz signed to Elektra Records and released his debut studio album, Waiting for My Rocket to Come, in October 2002. The album peaked at number 55 on the US Billboard 200 and was certified platinum by the Recording Industry Association of America (RIAA). "The Remedy (I Won't Worry)", the album's first single, peaked at number 15 on the Billboard Hot 100. Waiting for My Rocket to Come also spawned the singles "You and I Both" and "Curbside Prophet". In 2005, Mraz signed a new contract with Atlantic Records; he released his second studio album, Mr. A–Z, in July. The album was a commercial success, peaking at number five on the Billboard 200. Mr. A–Z spawned the singles "Wordplay", "Did You Get My Message?" and "Geek in the Pink".

In May 2008, Mraz released his third studio album, We Sing. We Dance. We Steal Things. The album debuted and peaked at number three on the Billboard 200 and was a commercial success worldwide. Mraz's international breakthrough came with the release of the album's lead single, "I'm Yours". It peaked at number six on the Billboard Hot 100, giving Mraz his first top ten single on the chart. "I'm Yours" stayed on the Hot 100 for 76 weeks, setting the record for the most total weeks on the chart. The single topped the charts in countries such as New Zealand and hit the ten in multiple other countries. We Sing. We Dance. We Steal Things. also spawned the singles "Make It Mine" and "Lucky", both of which achieved moderate commercial success. Mraz's fourth studio album, Love Is a Four Letter Word, was released in April 2012; it peaked at number two on the Billboard 200. The album was preceded by the release of its lead single "I Won't Give Up", which peaked at number eight on the Billboard Hot 100 and became an international hit.

Mraz's fifth studio album, Yes!, was released in July 2014; it peaked at number two on the Billboard 200 and consisted of the band Raining Jane as his backing band. His sixth studio album, Know., was released in August 2018 and featured Raining Jane as well.

On February 11, 2022, Mraz released his second compilation album Lalalalovesongs, which features a bonus track "Always Looking for You".

== Albums ==
=== Studio albums ===
List of studio albums, with selected chart positions, sales figures and certifications
Title	Album details	Peak chart positions										Sales	Certifications
Title	Album details	US	AUS	AUT	BEL	CAN	GER	NLD	NZ	SWI	UK	Sales	Certifications
Waiting for My Rocket to Come	Released: October 15, 2002 (US); Label: Elektra; Formats: CD, LP	55	61	—	—	—	—	—	35	—	—	US: 933,000	RIAA: Platinum
Mr. A–Z	Released: July 26, 2005 (US); Label: Atlantic; Formats: CD, LP, digital download	5	—	—	—	25	—	—	—	—	—		RIAA: Gold
We Sing. We Dance. We Steal Things.	Released: May 12, 2008 (US); Label: Atlantic; Formats: CD, LP, digital download	3	3	4	10	3	14	6	5	12	8	US: 1,700,000	RIAA: 4× Platinum; ARIA: 2× Platinum; BPI: Platinum; BVMI: Gold; IFPI SWI: Platinum; MC: 2× Platinum
Love Is a Four Letter Word	Released: April 13, 2012 (US); Label: Atlantic; Formats: CD, LP, digital download	2	23	6	22	1	12	2	25	4	2	US: 500,000	RIAA: Platinum; BPI: Gold; MC: Platinum
Yes!	Released: July 11, 2014 (US); Label: Atlantic; Formats: CD, LP, digital download	2	17	32	22	2	22	1	25	8	18		MC: Gold
Know.	Released: August 10, 2018 (US); Label: Atlantic; Formats: CD, LP, digital download	9	39	24	28	10	27	5	—	14	46	US: 26,000	
Look for the Good	Released: June 19, 2020 (US); Label: Interrabang/BMG; Formats: CD, LP, digital download	— (Note: Look for the Good did not enter the US Billboard 200, but did peak at number 25 on the Top Album Sales component chart.)	—	—	182	—	—	—	—	77	—		
Mystical Magical Rhythmical Radical Ride	Released: June 23, 2023; Label: Interrabang/BMG; Formats: CD, LP, digital download	— (Note: Mystical Magical Rhythmical Radical Ride did not enter the US Billboard 200, but did peak at number 23 on the Top Album Sales component chart.)	—	—	—	—	—	—	—	100	—		
Grandma’s Gospel Favorites	Released: April 26, 2026; Label: BMG; Formats: CD, LP												
"—" denotes a recording that did not chart or was not released in that territory.

=== Live albums ===
List of live albums, with selected chart positions
Title	Album details	Peak chart positions						
Title	Album details	US	US Rock	BEL (WA)	FRA	JPN	NLD	SPA
Live at Java Joe's	Released: January 29, 2001 (US); Formats: CD, LP	—	—	—	—	—	—	—
Sold Out (In Stereo)	Released: March 21, 2002 (US); Formats: CD	—	—	—	—	—	—	—
Tonight, Not Again: Jason Mraz Live at the Eagles Ballroom	Released: August 24, 2004 (US); Label: Elektra; Formats: CD, digital download	49	—	—	—	—	—	—
Selections for Friends – Live from: Schubas Tavern, Chicago, Montalvo Winery, Saratoga California	Released: February 13, 2007 (US); Label: Atlantic; Formats: Digital download	—	—	—	—	—	—	—
Jason Mraz's Beautiful Mess – Live on Earth	Released: November 10, 2009 (US); Label: Atlantic; Formats: CD, digital download	35	12	84	110	204	53	99
"—" denotes a recording that did not chart or was not released in that territory.

=== Compilation albums ===
List of compilation albums, with selected chart positions
Title	Album details	Peak chart positions
Title	Album details	FRA
We Sing. We Dance. We Steal Things. / Waiting for My Rocket to Come	Released: October 5, 2009 (FRA); Label: Atlantic; Formats: CD box set	129
Lalalalovesongs	Released: February 11, 2022; Formats: CD, vinyl, Digital download	—
"—" denotes a recording that did not chart or was not released in that territory.

=== Video albums ===
List of video albums, with selected chart positions
Title	Album details	Peak chart positions
Title	Album details	US Video
Tonight, Not Again: Jason Mraz Live at the Eagles Ballroom	Released: August 24, 2004 (US); Label: Elektra; Formats: DVD	2

== Extended plays ==
List of extended plays, with selected chart positions
Title	EP details	Peak chart positions		
Title	EP details	US	US Rock	CAN
A Jason Mraz Demonstration	Released: January 19, 1999 (US); Formats: CD	—	—	—
From the Cutting Room Floor	Released: August 30, 2001 (US); Formats: CD	—	—	—
On Love, In Sadness (The E Minor EP in F)	Released: October 25, 2001 (US); Formats: CD	—	—	—
Jimmy Kimmel Live: Jason Mraz	Released: March 22, 2005 (US); Label: Atlantic; Formats: Digital download	—	—	—
Extra Credit (EP)	Released: April 1, 2005 (US); Label: Atlantic; Formats: CD, digital download	—	—	—
Geekin' Out Across the Galaxy	Released: February 21, 2006 (US); Label: Atlantic; Formats: Digital download	—	—	—
iTunes Live: London Sessions	Released: March 17, 2008 (UK); Label: Atlantic; Formats: Digital download	—	—	—
We Sing.	Released: March 18, 2008 (US); Label: Atlantic; Formats: CD, Digital download	101	—	—
We Dance.	Released: April 15, 2008 (US); Label: Atlantic; Formats: CD, Digital download	52	12	—
We Steal Things.	Released: May 13, 2008 (US); Label: Atlantic; Formats: Digital download	—	—	—
Yours Truly: The I'm Yours Collection	Released: July 14, 2009 (US); Label: Atlantic; Formats: Digital download	—	—	—
Life Is Good	Released: October 4, 2010 (US); Label: Atlantic; Formats: Digital download	39	12	79
Live Is a Four Letter Word	Released: February 28, 2012 (US); Label: Atlantic; Formats: Digital download	56	12	—
iTunes Live from Hong Kong	Released: July 2, 2012 (HK); Label: Atlantic; Formats: Digital download	—	—	—
"—" denotes a recording that did not chart or was not released in that territory.

== Singles ==
=== As lead artist ===
List of singles as lead artist, with selected chart positions and certifications, showing year released and album name
Title	Year	Peak chart positions										Certifications	Album
Title	Year	US	AUS	AUT	BEL	CAN	GER	NLD	NZ	SWI	UK	Certifications	Album
"The Remedy (I Won't Worry)"	2003	15	63	—	—	—	—	12	32	—	79	RIAA: Platinum	Waiting for My Rocket to Come
"You and I Both"	2003	— (Note: "You and I Both" did not enter the Billboard Hot 100, but peaked at number 10 on the Bubbling Under Hot 100 Singles chart, which acts as an extension to the Hot 100.)	—	—	—	—	—	—	—	—	—	RIAA: Gold	Waiting for My Rocket to Come
"Curbside Prophet"	2004	—	—	—	—	—	—	—	—	—	—		Waiting for My Rocket to Come
"Wordplay"	2005	81	85	—	—	—	—	—	—	—	—		Mr. A–Z
"Did You Get My Message?" (featuring Rachael Yamagata)	2005	—	—	—	—	—	—	—	—	—	—		Mr. A–Z
"Geek in the Pink"	2006	— (Note: "Geek in the Pink" did not enter the Billboard Hot 100 but did peak at number 45 on the Digital Song Sales component chart.)	—	—	—	—	—	—	—	—	128		Mr. A–Z
"The Beauty in Ugly"	2007	— (Note: "The Beauty in Ugly" did not enter the Billboard Hot 100, but peaked at number 15 on the Bubbling Under Hot 100 Singles chart, which acts as an extension to the Hot 100.)	— (Note: "The Beauty in Ugly" did not enter the ARIA Singles Chart, but peaked at number 22 on the ARIA Digital Track Chart.)	—	—	—	—	—	—	—	—		Selections for Friends – Live from: Schubas Tavern, Chicago, Montalvo Winery, Saratoga California
"I'm Yours"	2008	6	3	2	2	3	8	9	1	5	11	RIAA: 13× Platinum; ARIA: 3× Platinum; BPI: 5× Platinum; BVMI: Gold; IFPI AUT: Gold; MC: 4× Platinum; RMNZ: 9× Platinum	We Sing. We Dance. We Steal Things.
"Make It Mine"	2008	—	—	—	52	—	100	48	—	—	82		We Sing. We Dance. We Steal Things.
"Lucky" (with Colbie Caillat)	2009	48	—	44	12	56	22	9	—	21	149	RIAA: 4× Platinum; BPI: Gold; MC: Gold; RMNZ: 2× Platinum	We Sing. We Dance. We Steal Things.
"I Won't Give Up"	2012	8	22	12	64	11	73	3	36	28	11	RIAA: 6× Platinum; ARIA: Platinum; BPI: 2× Platinum; IFPI SWI: Gold; MC: 3× Platinum; RMNZ: 3× Platinum	Love Is a Four Letter Word
"93 Million Miles"	2012	—	—	—	—	—	—	—	—	—	—		Love Is a Four Letter Word
"The Woman I Love"	2013	—	—	—	—	—	—	—	—	—	—		Love Is a Four Letter Word
"Love Someone"	2014	— (Note: "Love Someone" did not enter the Billboard Hot 100, but peaked at number 14 on the Bubbling Under Hot 100 Singles chart, which acts as an extension to the Hot 100.)	—	—	66	79	83	—	—	55	—		Yes!
"Have It All"	2018	90	—	—	62	—	—	—	— (Note: "Have It All" did not enter the NZ Top 40 Singles Chart, but peaked at number eight on the NZ Heatseeker Singles Chart.)	—	—	RIAA: Gold; RMNZ: Gold	Know.
"Unlonely"	2018	—	—	—	—	—	—	—	—	—	—		Know.
"Might as Well Dance"	2018	—	—	—	—	—	—	—	—	—	—		Know.
"More than Friends" (featuring Meghan Trainor)	2018	—	—	—	99	—	—	—	—	—	—		Know.
"Look for the Good"	2020	—	—	—	—	—	—	—	—	—	—		Look for the Good
"Wise Woman"	2020	—	—	—	—	—	—	—	—	—	—		Look for the Good
"You Do You" (featuring Tiffany Haddish)	2020	—	—	—	—	—	—	—	—	—	—		Look for the Good
"Be Where Your Feet Are"	2021	—	—	—	—	—	—	—	—	—	—		Look for the Good
"I Feel Like Dancing"	2023	—	—	—	—	—	—	—	—	—	—		Mystical Magical Rhythmical Radical Ride
"Pancakes & Butter"	2023	—	—	—	—	—	—	—	—	—	—		Mystical Magical Rhythmical Radical Ride
"His Eye Is On The Sparrow"	2026												Grandma's Gospel Favorites
"—" denotes a recording that did not chart or was not released in that territory.

=== As featured artist ===
List of singles as featured artist, with selected chart positions, showing year released and album name
Title	Year	Peak chart positions									Certifications	Album
Title	Year	US	US Adult	US Country	US Pop	US Rap	BEL (FL)	CAN Country	KOR	NZ	Certifications	Album
"Let's Get Lost" (Two Spot Gobi featuring Jason Mraz)	2009	—	—	—	—	—	—	—	—	—		Non-album singles
"Love Love Love" (Hope featuring Jason Mraz)	2010	—	—	—	—	—	—	—	45	—		Non-album singles
"Distance" (Christina Perri featuring Jason Mraz)	2012	—	20	—	—	—	—	—	—	—		Lovestrong
"Everybody's Got Somebody but Me" (Hunter Hayes featuring Jason Mraz)	2013	77	—	18	—	—	—	33	—	—	RIAA: Gold	Hunter Hayes
"Rough Water" (Travie McCoy featuring Jason Mraz)	2013	82	—	—	20	20	61	—	—	38		Non-album single
"I Am Alive" (JJ Lin featuring Jason Mraz)	2014	—	—	—	—	—	—	—	—	—		Genesis
"Bad Wolves" (Rebecca Jade featuring Jason Mraz, Miki Vale, Veronica May)	2020	—	—	—	—	—	—	—	—	—		Non-album single
"—" denotes a recording that did not chart or was not released in that territory.

=== Promotional singles ===
List of promotional singles, with selected chart positions, showing year released and album name
Title	Year	Peak chart positions								Album
Title	Year	US Rock Dig.	US Hol. Dig.	BEL	CAN	CAN AC	KOR	NLD	UK	Album
"Burning Bridges"	2006	—	—	—	—	—	—	—	—	Mr. A–Z
"Details in the Fabric" (featuring James Morrison)	2008	—	—	—	62	—	—	—	—	We Sing. We Dance. We Steal Things.
"The Dynamo of Volition"	2008	—	—	—	—	—	—	—	—	We Sing. We Dance. We Steal Things.
"Butterfly"	2008	—	—	60	—	—	—	76	—	We Sing. We Dance. We Steal Things.
"The World as I See It"	2011	18	—	—	—	—	35	—	—	Love Is a Four Letter Word
"The Freedom Song"	2012	19	—	71	—	—	—	94	—	Love Is a Four Letter Word
"Everything Is Sound"	2012	18	—	—	88	—	—	—	—	Love Is a Four Letter Word
"Living in the Moment"	2012	16	—	110	—	—	—	—	—	Love Is a Four Letter Word
"Hello, You Beautiful Thing"	2014	—	—	62	—	39	—	53	152	Yes!
"It's So Hard to Say Goodbye to Yesterday"	2014	—	—	—	—	—	—	90	—	Yes!
"You Can Rely on Me"	2014	—	—	—	—	—	—	—	—	Yes!
"Christmas Valentine" (Amazon Original) (with Ingrid Michaelson)	2019	—	43	—	—	—	—	—	—	Non-album promotional single
"—" denotes a recording that did not chart or was not released in that territory.

== Other charted songs ==
List of songs, with selected chart positions, showing year released and album name
Title	Year	Peak chart positions			Album
Title	Year	US	CAN	GER	Album
"Mr. Curiosity"	2005	—	—	44	Mr. A–Z
"If It Kills Me"	2008	92	74	—	We Sing. We Dance. We Steal Things.
"—" denotes a recording that did not chart or was not released in that territory.

== Other appearances ==
List of non-single guest appearances, with other performing artists, showing year released and album name
Title	Year	Other artist(s)	Album
"Curbside Prophet '04"	2004	—N/a	New York Minute soundtrack
"I Melt with You"	2004	—N/a	50 First Dates soundtrack
"Summer Breeze"	2004	—N/a	Everwood soundtrack
"Dramatica Mujer (Not So Usual)"	2005	Alex Cuba Band	Humo de Tabaco
"Shy That Way"	2005	Tristan Prettyman	Twentythree
"Good Old-Fashioned Lover Boy"	2005	—N/a	Killer Queen: A Tribute to Queen
"Unravel"	2005	—N/a	Hear Music XM Radio Sessions, Vol. 1
"The Boy's Gone"	2005	—N/a	Hear Music XM Radio Sessions, Vol. 1
"Plain Jane"	2005	—N/a	Hear Music XM Radio Sessions, Vol. 1
"Keep on Hoping"	2005	Raul Midón	State of Mind
"A Hard Rain's A-Gonna Fall"	2005	—N/a	Listen to Bob Dylan: A Tribute
"Rainbow Connection"	2006	—N/a	For the Kids Too!
"The Joker/Everything I Own"	2007	Chrissie Hynde	Happy Feet soundtrack
"Something to Believe In"	2008	Randy Jackson, Van Hunt, Jon McLaughlin	Randy Jackson's Music Club, Vol. 1
"Silent Love Song"	2008	Raining Jane	Fire Relief: A Benefit for the Victims of the 2007 San Diego Wildfires
"Long Road to Forgiveness"	2008	Brett Dennen	Songs for Survival
"Battling Giants"	2009	Ben's Brother	Battling Giants
"Kickin' with You"	2010	—N/a	When in Rome soundtrack
"Tomorrow"	2011	Two Spot Gobi	The Sun Will Rise
"Mirror"	2011	Amber Rubarth	A Common Case of Disappearing
"Ocean of Memories"	2011	Gregory Page	Bird In a Cage
"I Won't Give Up"	2013	Straight No Chaser	Under the Influence
"Bad Idea"	2015	Sara Bareilles	What's Inside: Songs from Waitress
"You Matter to Me"	2015	Sara Bareilles	What's Inside: Songs from Waitress
"Could I Love You Any More"	2019	Reneé Dominique	Could I Love You Any More
"Made for Two"	2019	Lucy Hale	Trouble soundtrack

== Music videos ==
=== As lead artist ===
List of music videos, showing year released and director
Title	Year	Director(s)
"The Remedy (I Won't Worry)"	2003	Dean Karr
"You And I Both"	2004	Elliot Lester, Gavin Bowden
"Life is Wonderful"	2005	
"Wordplay"	2005	Dean Karr
"Geek In The Pink"	2005	Jason Mraz, The Nova Project
"The Beauty in Ugly"	2007	
"I'm Yours"	2008	Darren Doane
"Make It Mine"	2008	Darren Doane
"Lucky" (with Colbie Caillat)	2009	Darren Doane
"I Won't Give Up"	2012	Mark Pellington
"93 Million Miles"	2012	Jeff Conman
"The Woman I Love"	2013	Elliott Sellers
"Love Someone"	2014	Jeff Nicholas, Jonathan Craven
"Hello, You Beautiful Thing"	2014	Jeff Nicholas, Jonathan Craven
"Long Drive"	2014	Jeff Nicholas, Jonathan Craven
"Have It All"	2018	Darren Doane

=== As featured artist ===
List of music videos, showing year released and director
Title	Year	Director(s)
"Love Love Love" (Hope featuring Jason Mraz)	2010	Sanaa Hamri
"Distance" (Christina Perri featuring Jason Mraz)	2011	Elliott Sellers
"Rough Water" (Travie McCoy featuring Jason Mraz)	2013	Ethan Lader
"Everybody's Got Somebody but Me" (Hunter Hayes featuring Jason Mraz)	2013	Shane Drake
