= Jason Mraz's Beautiful Mess: Live on Earth =

Live album by Jason Mraz
- Released: November 6, 2009
- Recorded: August 13, 2009
- Genre: Pop
- Length: 78:34
- Label: Atlantic
- Producer: Jason Mraz

Jason Mraz chronology
We Sing. We Dance. We Steal Things. (2008)	Jason Mraz's Beautiful Mess: Live on Earth (2009)	Love Is a Four Letter Word (2012)

Jason Mraz's Beautiful Mess: Live on Earth is a live album and DVD by the American singer/songwriter Jason Mraz, released in 2009. It was recorded on August 13, 2009, in Chicago at the Charter One Pavilion.

It has been certified Gold in Brazil.

== Track listing ==
1. "Intro"
2. "Sunshine Song"
3. "Traveler"/"Make It Mine"
4. "Anything You Want"
5. "Coyotes"
6. "Live High"
7. "Only Human"
8. "The Remedy"
9. "The Dynamo of Volition"
10. "A Beautiful Mess"
11. "I'm Yours"
12. "Lucky" (And. Colbie Caillat)
13. "Copchase"
14. "All Night Long"
15. "Fall Through Glass" (DVD only)
16. "Butterfly"
17. "The Boy's Gone"
18. "You and I Both" (iTunes pre-order only)

DVD extras

1. "Un Beau Désodre"
2. "We Sing. We Dance. We Make Videos."
3. "Interview with attendees Elvin and Lisa Carmichael."

== Production ==
- Art direction and design: Greg Gigendad Burke
- Illustration: Luca Tieri
- Photography: Darren Ankenman and Jeff Nicholas
- DVD directed by Darren Doane
- Music mixed by John Alagía and Jon Altschiller

== Charts ==
Chart performance for Jason Mraz's Beautiful Mess: Live on Earth
Chart (2009)	Peak position
Belgian Albums (Ultratop Wallonia)	84
Dutch Albums (Album Top 100)	53
French Albums (SNEP)	110
Spanish Albums (PROMUSICAE)	99
US Billboard 200	35
US Top Rock Albums (Billboard)	12
