= Tonight, Not Again: Jason Mraz Live at the Eagles Ballroom =

Live album by Jason Mraz
- Released: August 24, 2004
- Recorded: October 28, 2003 at The Eagles Ballroom, Milwaukee, WI
- Genre: Rock
- Length: 76:23
- Label: Elektra

Jason Mraz chronology
Waiting for My Rocket to Come (2002)	Tonight, Not Again: Jason Mraz Live at the Eagles Ballroom (2004)	Extra Credit (2005)

Professional ratings
Review scores
Source	Rating
AllMusic	3/5 stars

Tonight, Not Again: Jason Mraz Live at the Eagles Ballroom is a live album and DVD by American singer-songwriter Jason Mraz, released in 2004. It was recorded in October 2003 in Milwaukee, Wisconsin.

== Track listing ==
=== CD ===
1. "Tonight, Not Again" (Keene, Jason Mraz) – 7:55
2. "Not So Usual" (Mraz, Terefe) – 3:33
3. "Dialogue" – 0:52
4. "No Doubling Back" (Mraz, Zizzo) – 4:30
5. "You and I Both" (Mraz) – 3:39
6. "Absolutely Zero" (Mraz) – 6:15
7. "1000 Things" (Mraz) – 4:10
8. "Common Pleasure" (Mraz) – 5:18
9. "Curbside Prophet" (Galewood, Mraz, Ruffalo) – 5:13
10. "Sleeping to Dream" (Mraz, Stuart) – 4:13
11. "Unfold" (Mraz) – 8:28
12. "No Stopping Us" (Mraz) – 6:09
13. "The Remedy (I Won't Worry)" (Christy, Edwards, Mraz, Spock) – 3:39
14. "After an Afternoon" (Mraz, Quirolo) – 3:46
15. "Too Much Food" (Mraz) – 8:43

=== DVD ===
1. "Tonight, Not Again"
2. "Not So Usual"
3. "Dialogue"
4. "No Doubling Back"
5. "You and I Both"
6. "Absolutely Zero"
7. "1000 Things"
8. "Common Pleasure"
9. "Curbside Prophet"
10. "Sleeping to Dream"
11. "Unfold"
12. "The Right Kind of Phrase"
13. "No Stopping Us"
14. "The Remedy (I Won't Worry)"
15. "After an Afternoon"
16. "Too Much Food"

== Personnel ==
The band

- Jason Mraz – lead vocals, acoustic guitar, electric guitar
- Noel "Toca" Rivera – backing vocals, bongos, shakers, tambourine, other percussion
- Bill Bell – lead guitar, acoustic guitar, slide guitar
- Eric Hinojosa – electric piano, organ, synthesizer, banjo
- Ian Sheridan – bass guitar, backing vocals
- Adam King – drums

Additional musicians

- Kenny Anderson – trumpet
- JoWestly Boston – saxophone
- Johnny Cotton – trombone
- John Popper – harmonica

== Production ==
- Executive producer: Bill Silva
- Engineers: Pete Novak, Nick Terzo
- Assistant engineer: Pete Novak
- Mixing: Mark O'Donoughue, Tim Palmer
- Mastering: Stephen Marcussen
- Horn arrangements: James "Diamond" Williams
- Direction: Nigel Dick

== Charts ==
Chart (2004)	Peak position
US Billboard 200	49
