= Wordplay (song) =

Single by Jason Mraz

from the album Mr. A–Z
- Released: May 29, 2005
- Recorded: 2005
- Genre: Pop rock, alternative rock
- Length: 3:06
- Label: Atlantic
- Songwriters: Jason Mraz, Kevin Kadish
- Producer: Kevin Kadish

Jason Mraz singles chronology
"Curbside Prophet" (2004)	"Wordplay" (2005)	"Geek in the Pink" (2006)

"Wordplay" is a song by Jason Mraz released as the first single from his 2005 album Mr. A–Z. The song was Mraz's second entry on the Billboard Hot 100 at number 81 after "The Remedy (I Won't Worry)".

The song was the most successful single from Mr. A–Z.

== Music video ==
Directed by Dean Karr, the video starts with Mraz, his band, and a wizard (who magically plays the guitar) all playing their instruments in a field. He is then seen sitting on fallen tree playing his guitar. While he is playing his guitar an old man can be seen walking by who cannot stand listening to the music he is playing. The old man then begins the process of stoning him to try to get him to stop. Throughout the video more and more people gather to continue stoning him. The wizard, who is playing the guitar, is actually Mraz himself dressed as the wizard. The video then continues to show all of the previous shots. It ends with him extremely injured from being stoned and then fades to black.

== Track listing ==
1. "I'm Yours" (original demo)
2. "Wordplay"
3. "Life Is Wonderful" (alternate version) (featuring Gregory Page)

== Personnel ==
- Jason Mraz – lead vocals, acoustic and electric guitars
- Jack Daley – bass guitar
- Lyle Workman – electric guitar, Dobro resonator guitar
- Nir "Nir Z" Zidkyahu – drums
- Roger Joseph Manning, Jr. – keyboards
- Bashiri Johnson – percussion
- Josh Deutsch – castanets, production, executive production
- Kevin Kadish – acoustic guitar, production
- Samuel "Vaughn" Merrick – engineering
- David Thoener – mixing
- Ted Jensen – mastering

== Charts ==
Chart performance for "Wordplay"
Chart (2005)	Peak position
Australia (ARIA)	85
Canada Hot AC Top 30 (Radio & Records)	12
US Billboard Hot 100	81
US Adult Pop Airplay (Billboard)	16

== Release history ==
Release dates and formats for "Wordplay"
Region	Date	Format	Label(s)	Ref.
United States	July 26, 2005	Mainstream airplay	Atlantic	
