= We Sing. We Dance. We Steal Things. =

Studio album by Jason Mraz
- Released: May 12, 2008
- Recorded: 2007–2008
- Studios: Kensaltown Recording Studios (London, England); Little Big Sound Studio (Nashville, Tennessee); Casa Nova Studio (Oceanside, California)
- Genres: Pop; folk; blue-eyed soul; jazz
- Length: 50:49
- Label: Atlantic
- Producer: Martin Terefe

Jason Mraz chronology
We Steal Things. (2008)	We Sing. We Dance. We Steal Things. (2008)	Beautiful Mess: Live on Earth (2009)

Singles from We Sing. We Dance. We Steal Things.
- 1. "I'm Yours" Released: February 12, 2008; 2. "Make It Mine" Released: August 8, 2008; 3. "Lucky" Released: January 13, 2009

We Sing. We Dance. We Steal Things. is the third studio album by American musician Jason Mraz, released on May 12, 2008. The album peaked at number three in the Billboard 200, making it Mraz's highest-peaking album at the time. Mraz took the name of the album from a work by the artist David Shrigley.

On August 10, 2023, the album was certified 4× Platinum by the Recording Industry Association Of America.

== Background and production ==
Progress of the recording of the album has been documented on the YouTube series "Crazy Man's Ju-ju" which contain clips from San Diego and London, where most of the album was made. "I'm Yours" was the first single from the album and was made available on iTunes, Zune Marketplace and Amazon.com on February 12, 2008. The album features collaborations with James Morrison on the track "Details in the Fabric" and with Colbie Caillat on the track "Lucky".

The album was preceded by three EPs released at monthly intervals for a limited time. We Sing. was released on March 18. We Dance. was released on April 15. The third installment, We Steal Things., was released as part of a digital bundle through iTunes, JasonMraz.com and AtlanticRecords.com on the release of the album on May 13, 2008. Up to March 17, 2010, the album had sold 1,491,736 copies in the US. In 2016, the album was certified three times Platinum by the RIAA.

On November 18, 2008, the album was re-released with the name We Sing. We Dance. We Steal Things. Limited Edition. The re-released album is a three disc set that includes the original 12-track CD, the second disc includes the three EPs all on one disc, and the third DVD includes an unreleased full-band concert Live at the Highline Ballroom in New York, a 30-minute documentary titled "Here We Are" and a preview to Mraz's "a thousand things." Polaroid book. The packaging also includes a 20-page CD booklet with full lyrics and additional artwork.

In honor of the album's fifteenth birthday, a deluxe version of the album, entitled We Sing. We Dance. We Steal Things. Deluxe Edition. was released on September 22, 2023. The version contains 14 new-to-vinyl songs, including demos and a previously unreleased song.

== Critical reception ==
Professional ratings
Aggregate scores
Source	Rating
Metacritic	60/100
Review scores
Source	Rating
AllMusic	3.5/5 stars
Blender	2.5/5 stars
Entertainment Weekly	B+
Entertainment.ie	2/5 stars
MSN Music (Consumer Guide)	(choice cut)
PopMatters	7/10 stars
Yahoo! Music	4/10 stars
Slant Magazine	3/5 stars
Sputnikmusic	3/5 stars

The album, overall, gained mixed to positive reviews. Commenting on the album's "pleasantly lightweight jams", "beachy guitars", "R&B horns" and "playful scat singing", Entertainment Weekly gave the album a B+. In an overall positive review, Billboard said, "Mraz emerges even bolder than before on an album loaded with strings, horns, formidable grooves and a dozen songs dripping with mantra-like positivity."

AllMusic wrote, "The nice thing about the soulful shimmer of We Sing is that it's so slick that it's easy to ignore the gibberish spilling out of Mraz's mouth and just enjoy the sunny, easy sound."

PopMatters wrote that "the album sounds great, and Mraz knows what he is up to. Less clear, I think, is whether the razzle-dazzle wordsmith who loves his Eminem records is ready to truly enter the marketplace as a serious vocalist and a sober songwriter", giving the album a positive rating of seven out of ten overall.

Giving the album two-and-a-half out of five stars, Blender concluded that whether "pondering his parents divorce or describing intricate and delicate sex acts, Mraz's tasty tenor remains a modestly classy pleasure. But he's lost crucial cool."

Even less flattering, Uncut magazine said that "listening to [the album] is like being followed home by a puppy — initially cute and guilelessly affecting, but rapidly irritating". Writing for The Big Issue, Lianne Steinberg stated that "listening to this album is akin to being woken from a comfortable deep sleep by a circus clown with a water pistol full of warm urine", singling out the "terrible lyrics and hamfisted rhymes" for their "hilarity".

== Track listing ==
We Sing. We Dance. We Steal Things. track listing
No.	Title	Writer(s)	Length
1.	"Make It Mine"	Jason Mraz	3:08
2.	"I'm Yours"	Jason Mraz	4:02
3.	"Lucky" (with Colbie Caillat)	Jason Mraz, Colbie Caillat, Timothy Fagan	3:09
4.	"Butterfly"	Jason Mraz	5:00
5.	"Live High"	Jason Mraz	4:12
6.	"Love for a Child"	Jason Mraz, Martin Terefe, Sacha Skarbek	4:05
7.	"Details in the Fabric" (featuring James Morrison)	Jason Mraz, Dan Wilson	5:45
8.	"Coyotes"	Jason Mraz	3:38
9.	"Only Human"	Jason Mraz, Sacha Skarbek	4:02
10.	"The Dynamo of Volition"	Jason Mraz	3:36
11.	"If It Kills Me"	Jason Mraz, Martin Terefe, Sacha Skarbek	4:33
12.	"A Beautiful Mess"	Jason Mraz, Mona Tavakoli, Chaska Potter, Mai Bloomfield, Becky Gebhardt	5:37

iTunes bonus tracks
No.	Title	Writer(s)	Length
13.	"Make It Mine" (live: London Sessions)	Jason Mraz	3:30
14.	"Life Is Wonderful" (live from Amsterdam)	Jason Mraz	4:35

Limited edition bonus tracks (Disc 2)
No.	Title	Writer(s)	Length
1.	"I'm Yours" (From the Casa Nova Sessions)		4:47
2.	"Live High" (From an Avocado Salad Session)		4:03
3.	"If It Kills Me" (From the Casa Nova Sessions)		5:01
4.	"A Beautiful Mess" (From a Raining Jane Session)		5:15
5.	"Make It Mine" (From the Casa Nova Sessions)		3:24
6.	"Butterfly" (From the Casa Nova Sessions)		5:11
7.	"Only Human" (From the Casa Nova Sessions)		4:48
8.	"The Dynamo of Volition" (From an All-Night Session)		4:23
9.	"Love for a Child" (From the Casa Nova Sessions)		3:53
10.	"Coyotes" (From a Girl in New York Sessions)		4:19
11.	"Man Gave Names to All the Animals" (From the Gospel Collection Sessions)	Bob Dylan	4:18
12.	"Mudhouse/Gypsy MC" (Live from Amsterdam)		7:00

Limited edition bonus tracks (Disc 3/DVD)
No.	Title	Length
1.	"Plane"
2.	"Make It Mine"
3.	"Geek in the Pink"
4.	"Dramatica Mujer"
5.	"The Dynamo of Volition"
6.	"A Beautiful Mess"
7.	"If It Kills Me"
8.	"The Remedy (I Won't Worry)"
9.	"1000 Things"
10.	"Live High"
11.	"Only Human"
12.	"Butterfly"
13.	"I'm Yours"
14.	"No Stopping Us"
15.	"Fall Through Glass"
16.	"Outro"
17.	"Here We Are" (A Mraz Documentary)
18.	"A Thousand Things" (Book Preview)

Tour edition (Bonus tracks)
No.	Title	Writer(s)	Length
13.	"I'm Yours" (From the Casa Nova Sessions)		4:47
14.	"Mudhouse/Gypsy MC" (live in Amsterdam)		7:00
15.	"Man Gave Names to All the Animals" (From the Gospel Collection Sessions)	Bob Dylan	4:18
16.	"Life Is Wonderful" (live in Amsterdam)		4:35

Tour edition (DVD)
No.	Title	Length
1.	"I'm Yours" (Recorded at the Paradiso in Amsterdam on July 9, 2007 by Fabchannel)
2.	"Here We Are (Documentary)" (a film by Jarrod Allen, Produced by Jason Mraz)

The Latin American and Spanish re-release of the album includes a Spanish version of the song "Lucky" which was recorded by Mraz and the Mexican singer Ximena Sariñana.

== Personnel ==
- Jason Mraz – lead vocals on all tracks, guitar on all tracks

Additional personnel

- Martin Terefe – bass guitar (all tracks except 7), piano (2, 3), guitar (2), drums (6, 11), choir vocals (8), production (all tracks)
- Karl Brazil – drums (1, 4, 5, 10)
- Luke Potashnick – guitar (1, 4–6, 8, 10)
- Nikolas Torp Larsen – keyboards (all tracks except 9), choir vocals (8)
- Carlos Sosa – tenor saxophone (1, 4, 5, 9), baritone saxophone (1, 4, 9), flute (4), horn arrangements
- Fernie Castillo – trumpet (1, 4, 5, 9), flugelhorn (4), horn arrangements
- Raul "Ralo" Vallejo – trombone (1, 4, 5, 9), horn arrangements
- Noel "Toca" Rivera – backing vocals (1, 2, 12)
- Abby Schwartz – backing vocals (1, 2)
- Gianna Muir-Robinson – backing vocals (1, 2)
- Lauren De Rose – backing vocals (1, 2)
- Taylor-Tay – backing vocals (1, 2)
- Kristoffer Sonne – drums (2, 3, 8, 9, 12)
- Colbie Caillat – vocals (3)
- David Davidson – violin (3, 6, 7, 11, 12), string arrangements
- David Angell – violin (3, 6, 7, 11, 12)
- Kristin Wilkinson – viola (3, 6, 7, 11, 12)
- Keith Nichols – cello (3, 12)
- Judy Renea Flenoid – choir vocals (5)
- Shardie Flenoid – choir vocals (5)
- Karen Mills – choir vocals (5)
- Betty Mills – choir vocals (5)
- Chirell Warren – choir vocals (5)
- Tanya Tolver – choir vocals (5)
- Tanya Murphy – choir vocals (5)
- Ida Rhem – choir vocals (5)
- Sia Thompson – choir vocals (5)
- Connie Corn – choir vocals (5)
- Sacha Skarbek – piano (6), keyboards (9)
- John Catchings – cello (6, 7, 11)
- James Morrison – vocals (7)

- Bushwalla – voicemail message (7), backing vocals (12)
- Andreas Olssen – synthesizer (8), 808 (10), programming (all tracks)
- Aaron Leibowitz – saxophone (8)
- Justin Kirk – trombone (8)
- Ben Adamson – trumpet (8)
- Noah Terefe – choir vocals (8)
- Rita Ora – choir vocals (8)
- Kiera McGuinness – choir vocals (8)
- Olivia Ansah-Smith – choir vocals (8)
- Julia Morgan – choir vocals (8)
- Julia Cailleteau – choir vocals (8)
- Kiera Zekra – choir vocals (8)
- Teymor Gray – choir vocals (8)
- Joseph Alfille-Cook – choir vocals (8)
- Sofia Loopuit – choir vocals (8)
- Walid Massoud – choir vocals (8)
- Thomas Picard – choir vocals (8)
- Hanna Terefe – choir vocals (8)
- Tia Terefe – choir vocals (8)
- Pete Ibsen – choir vocals (8)
- Nick Whitecross – choir vocals (8)
- Jon Hall – choir vocals (8)
- Savanna Sparks – choir vocals (8)
- Rebecca Lacey – choir vocals (8)
- Zatac Sylwiz – choir vocals (8)
- Xoreal Harrison – choir vocals (8)
- Millet Oliver – choir vocals (8)
- Jane Tomes – backing vocals (12)
- Alexis Fedorowich – backing vocals (12)
- Tricia Huffman – backing vocals (12)

=== Production credits ===
- Tony Maserati – mixing
- Szyyd Drullard and Adam Thompson – mixing assistance
- Chris Gehringer – mastering
- Bil Zelman – interior album photo

== Charts ==
=== Weekly charts ===
Weekly chart performance for We Sing. We Dance. We Steal Things.
Chart (2008–2023)	Peak position
Argentine Albums (CAPIF)	18
Australian Albums (ARIA)	3
Austrian Albums (Ö3 Austria)	4
Belgian Albums (Ultratop Flanders)	47
Belgian Albums (Ultratop Wallonia)	15
Canadian Albums (Billboard)	3
Danish Albums (Hitlisten)	24
Dutch Albums (Album Top 100)	6
French Albums (SNEP)	6
German Albums (Offizielle Top 100)	14
Hungarian Physical Albums (MAHASZ)	12
Irish Albums (IRMA)	15
Italian Albums (FIMI)	36
New Zealand Albums (RMNZ)	5
Norwegian Albums (VG-lista)	4
Portuguese Albums (AFP)	4
Scottish Albums (Official Charts)	18
Spanish Albums (Promusicae)	9
Swedish Albums (Sverigetopplistan)	5
Swiss Albums (Schweizer Hitparade)	12
UK Albums (Official Charts)	8
US Billboard 200	3
US Top Rock Albums (Billboard)	2

=== Year-end charts ===
2008 year-end chart performance for We Sing. We Dance. We Steal Things.
Chart (2008)	Position
Australian Albums (ARIA)	10
Austrian Albums (Ö3 Austria)	64
Dutch Albums (Album Top 100)	36
French Albums (SNEP)	60
German Albums (Offizielle Top 100)	100
Swedish Albums (Sverigetopplistan)	32
Swiss Albums (Schweizer Hitparade)	64
US Billboard 200	68
US Top Rock Albums (Billboard)	15

2009 year-end chart performance for We Sing. We Dance. We Steal Things.
Chart (2009)	Position
Australian Albums (ARIA)	64
Belgian Albums (Ultratop Wallonia)	31
Canadian Albums (Billboard)	20
Dutch Albums (Album Top 100)	29
French Albums (SNEP)	15
New Zealand Albums (RMNZ)	29
Swiss Albums (Schweizer Hitparade)	67
UK Albums (OCC)	50
US Billboard 200	28
US Top Rock Albums (Billboard)	8

2010 year-end chart performance for We Sing. We Dance. We Steal Things.
Chart (2010)	Position
Dutch Albums (Album Top 100)	75

== Certifications ==
Certifications for We Sing. We Dance. We Steal Things.
Region	Certification	Certified units/sales
Australia (ARIA)	2× Platinum	140,000^{^}
Belgium (BRMA)	Gold	15,000^{*}
Brazil (Pro-Música Brasil)	3× Diamond	750,000^{‡}
Canada (Music Canada)	4× Platinum	320,000^{‡}
Denmark (IFPI Danmark)	2× Platinum	40,000^{‡}
France (SNEP)	3× Platinum	300,000^{*}
Germany (BVMI)	Gold	100,000^{^}
Ireland (IRMA)	Gold	7,500^{^}
Japan (RIAJ)	Gold	100,000^{^}
Netherlands (NVPI)	Gold	30,000^{^}
New Zealand (RMNZ)	2× Platinum	30,000^{‡}
Portugal (AFP)	Gold	10,000^{^}
Singapore (RIAS)	2× Platinum	20,000^{*}
Sweden (GLF)	Gold	20,000^{^}
Switzerland (IFPI Switzerland)	Platinum	30,000^{^}
United Kingdom (BPI)	Platinum	300,000^{^}
United States (RIAA)	4× Platinum	4,000,000^{‡}
Summaries
Europe (IFPI)	Platinum	1,000,000^{*}
^{*} Sales figures based on certification alone.^{^} Shipments figures based on certification alone.^{‡} Sales+streaming figures based on certification alone.
