= We Dance =

We Dance may refer to:

- We Dance, a Wii game companion to We Sing
- "We Dance", a song by Pavement on the album Wowee Zowee
- "We Dance", a song performed during the 2026 FIFA World Cup final halftime show
- We Dance. EP
