= Mr. A–Z =

Studio album by Jason Mraz
- Released: July 26, 2005
- Recorded: 2004–2005
- Studio: Allaire Studios (Shokan, New York); Chez Mraz (San Diego, California); Pulse Studios (Los Angeles, California)
- Genre: Pop rock
- Length: 54:25
- Label: Atlantic
- Producer: Steve Lillywhite; Josh Deutsch; Kevin Kadish

Jason Mraz chronology
Jimmy Kimmel Live: Jason Mraz (2005)	Mr. A–Z (2005)	Geekin' Out Across the Galaxy (2006)

Singles from Mr. A–Z
- 1. "Wordplay" Released: May 29, 2005; 2. "Geek in the Pink" Released: March 6, 2006

Professional ratings
Aggregate scores
Source	Rating
Metacritic	58/100
Review scores
Source	Rating
AllMusic	2.5/5 stars
Entertainment Weekly	C+
The Guardian	3/5 stars
MSN Music (Consumer Guide)	(choice cut)
MusicOMH	3/5 stars
PopMatters	3/10
Rolling Stone	1.5/5 stars
Slant Magazine	2.5/5 stars

Mr. A–Z is the second album by the American singer-songwriter Jason Mraz, released on July 26, 2005. It is the follow-up to his first album Waiting for My Rocket to Come, released in 2002. Even with mixed reviews, it was a moderate commercial success and debuted at number 5 on Billboard's Top 200 albums chart. It was recognized for mixing many different genres of music together.

It was nominated by the Recording Academy for best engineered album, and the producer Steve Lillywhite, who previously worked with U2, Dave Matthews Band and The Rolling Stones, won for Producer of the Year, but not for his work on Mr. A–Z. The name of the album is a play on the artist's surname, "Mraz".

An opera solo performed by Mraz himself can be found on the track "Mr. Curiosity". In March 2010, this song charted in Germany after it had been performed by Lena Meyer-Landrut in the talent show contest Unser Star für Oslo (Our Star for Oslo), reaching a peak position of number 44.

== Formats ==
In the United States and Europe, the album was released both as a CD and as a DualDisc. The DualDisc version has enhanced packaging and an extra booklet.

In July 2022, the album was reissued for the first time on vinyl, pressed to 2 LPs on both black and limited edition translucent blue vinyl versions.

== Track listing ==
No.	Title	Writer(s)	Length
1.	"Life Is Wonderful"	Jason Mraz	4:20
2.	"Wordplay"	Jason Mraz, Kevin Kadish	3:06
3.	"Geek in the Pink"	Jason Mraz, Kevin Kadish, Scott Storch, Ian Sheridan	3:55
4.	"Did You Get My Message? (feat. Rachael Yamagata)"	Jason Mraz, Dan Wilson	4:00
5.	"Mr. Curiosity"	Jason Mraz, Dennis Morris, Lester Mendez	3:54
6.	"Clockwatching"	Jason Mraz, Dennis Morris, Ainslie Henderson	4:23
7.	"Bella Luna"	Jason Mraz, Billy "Bushwalla" Galewood	5:02
8.	"Plane"	Jason Mraz, Dennis Morris	5:13
9.	"O. Lover"	Jason Mraz, Dennis Morris	3:54
10.	"Please Don't Tell Her"	Jason Mraz, Eric Hinojosa	4:40
11.	"The Forecast"	Jason Mraz, Eric Hinojosa	3:44
12.	"Song for a Friend"	Jason Mraz, Dan Wilson, Dennis Morris, Eric Hinojosa	8:09

Bonus Tracks
No.	Title	Length
13.	"Geek in the Pink (Lillywhite Remix)" (iTunes Bonus Track)	3:56
14.	"Rocket Man (Acoustic Demo)" (U.S. and International iTunes Bonus Track)	3:35
15.	"Burning Bridges (Unreleased Demo)" (International iTunes Bonus Track)	3:49
16.	"Prettiest Friend (Demo)" (International iTunes Bonus Track)	4:19

2022 2xLP Deluxe Vinyl Edition
No.	Title	Length
17.	"Life Is Wonderful (Instrumental)" (Vinyl Bonus Track)
18.	"Geek in the Pink (Instrumental – Lillywhite Mix)" (Vinyl Bonus Track)
19.	"Bella Luna (Instrumental)" (Vinyl Bonus Track)
20.	"Song for a Friend (Instrumental)" (Vinyl Bonus Track)

== Personnel ==
- Jason Mraz – lead vocals on all tracks, acoustic guitar on all tracks, electric guitar on all tracks

Additional personnel

- Ian Sheridan – bass guitar on tracks 1, 4, 5, 6, 7, 8, 9, 10, 11 and 12, backing vocals on track 4
- Bill Bell – guitar on tracks 1, 4, 5, 6, 7, 8, 9, 10, 11 and 12, backing vocals on track 4
- Adam King – drums on tracks 1, 4, 5, 6, 7, 8, 9, 10, 11 and 12, backing vocals on track 4
- Eric Hinojosa – keyboards on tracks 1, 4, 5, 6, 7, 8, 9, 10, 11 and 12, backing vocals on track 4, programming on track 8
- Raul Rekow – congas on tracks 1, 4, 5, 6, 7, 8, 9, 10, 11 and 12, percussion on tracks 1, 4, 5, 6, 7, 8, 9, 10, 11 and 12
- Karl Perazzo – timbales on tracks 1, 4, 5, 6, 7, 8, 9, 10, 11 and 12, percussion on tracks 1, 4, 5, 6, 7, 8, 9, 10, 11 and 12
- Jack Daley – bass guitar on track 2
- Lyle Workman – electric guitar on tracks 2 and 3, Dobro resonator guitar on tracks 2 and 3
- Nir "Nir Z" Zidkyahu – drums on track 2
- Roger Joseph Manning, Jr. – keyboards on track 2 and 3, Moog bass synthesizer on track 3
- Bashiri Johnson – percussion on track 2
- Mike Elizondo – bass guitar on track 3
- Ahmir "Questlove" Thompson – drums on track 3
- Steve Sidelnyk – programming on track 3
- DJ Bob Necksnapp – scratching and mixing on track 3
- Bushwalla – spoken word on track 3
- Noel "Toca" Rivera – backing vocals on tracks 4, 10 and 11
- Nicole Bayer – cello on track 5
- Roxanne Oldham – backing vocals on track 6
- Danielle Decker – backing vocals on track 6
- Raul Midón – classical guitar on track 7, electric guitar on track 12, faux horn on track 12, backing vocals on track 12
- Charlie Mingroni – spoken word on track 8
- Dennis Morris – programming on track 9
- Lee Davis High School Choir – choir vocals on track 12
- Steve Lilywhite – backing vocals on track 6, production on tracks 1, 4, 5, 6, 7, 8, 9, 10, 11 and 12, mixing on tracks 1, 4, 5, 6, 7, 8, 9, 10, 11 and 12
- Carl Glanville – engineering on tracks 1, 4, 5, 6, 7, 8, 9, 10, 11 and 12, mixing on tracks 1, 4, 5, 6, 7, 8, 9, 10, 11 and 12
- Scott Moore – backing vocals on track 6, engineering assistance on tracks 1, 4, 5, 6, 7, 8, 9, 10, 11 and 12
- Matthew Cullen – engineering assistance on tracks 1, 4, 5, 6, 7, 8, 9, 10, 11 and 12
- Josh Deutsch – castanets on track 2, production on tracks 2 and 3, executive production on all tracks
- Kevin Kadish – acoustic guitar on track 2, production on tracks 2 and 3
- Samuel "Vaughn" Merrick – engineering on tracks 2 and 3
- David Thoener – mixing on track 2
- Jim Scott – mixing on track 3
- Ted Jensen – mastering on all tracks

== Charts ==
Chart performance for Mr. A–Z
Chart (2005)	Peak position
Canadian Albums (Nielsen SoundScan)	25
US Billboard 200	5

== Certifications ==
Certifications for Mr. A–Z
Region	Certification	Certified units/sales
United States (RIAA)	Gold	500,000^{‡}
^{‡} Sales+streaming figures based on certification alone.
