= We Dance. (EP) =

EP by Jason Mraz
- Released: April 15, 2008
- Genre: Rock
- Length: 18:03

Jason Mraz chronology
We Sing. (2008)	We Dance. (2008)	We Steal Things. (2008)

We Dance. is the second EP of a three EP collection that was available for a limited time from the singer/songwriter Jason Mraz to help promote his third studio album, We Sing. We Dance. We Steal Things.. Physical copies of this EP are rare. It was mainly released for those who pre-ordered We Sing, We Dance, We Steal Things from JasonMraz.com. The EP was released on April 15, 2008. The EP is also included on the limited-edition version of We Sing. We Dance. We Steal Things. which was released on November 18, 2008. It peaked at number 52 on Billboard 200 on May 3, 2008.

== Track listing ==
No.	Title	Length
1.	"Make It Mine (From the Casa Nova Sessions)"	3:23
2.	"Butterfly (From the Casa Nova Sessions)"	5:10
3.	"Only Human (From the Casa Nova Sessions)"	4:47
4.	"The Dynamo of Volition (From an All-Night Session)"	4:43

== Charts ==
Chart (2008)	Peak position
US Billboard 200	52
