= Geek in the Pink =

Single by Jason Mraz

from the album Mr. A–Z
- B-side: "The Remedy (I Won't Worry)", "No Stopping Us"
- Released: March 6, 2006
- Genre: Pop rap
- Length: 3:55 (Album Version); 3:47 (Radio Edit)
- Label: Wea/Atlantic
- Songwriters: Jason Mraz, Ian Sheridan, Kevin Kadish
- Producer: Steve Lillywhite

Jason Mraz singles chronology
"Wordplay" (2005)	"Geek in the Pink" (2006)	"I'm Yours" (2008)

"Geek in the Pink" is a 2006 single by Jason Mraz from his album Mr. A–Z.

In 2007, American Idol contestant Chris Richardson performed "Geek in the Pink." "Geek in the Pink" peaked at #22 on the U.S. iTunes Store on March 10, 2007.

Canadian Idol contestant Greg Neufeld also sang this song during the fifth season of Canadian Idol.

== Track listing ==
=== UK CD1 ===
1. "Geek in the Pink" (album version) - 3:55
2. "The Remedy (I Won't Worry)" (Eagles Ballroom live version) - 3:39

=== UK CD2 ===
1. "Geek in the Pink" (album version) - 3:55
2. "No Stopping Us" (Eagles Ballroom live version) - 6:10
3. "Geek in the Pink" (CD-Rom video)
4. "The Making of Mr. A-Z"

== Music video ==
The video starts with Mraz in a pink shirt on the street in the city of Venice Beach, CA. He wears a pink shirt that reads OTAKU (means 'geek' in Japanese). He continues to promote the record while letting people listen to the CD by giving them headphones. The video then moves to Jason sitting in the back of someone's truck listening to his own song, "Geek in the Pink." The video then moves from the city, to the boardwalk, then to the beach, while he is still promoting the new album. At one point on the boardwalk he buys and wears pink flip-flop sandals. The video continues to show all of the previous shots, with the video ending with him and his two friends falling down on the beach at sunset. The video then fades to black. The video premiered on December 19, 2005.

== Charts ==
Chart (2005–10)	Peak position
Hungary (Rádiós Top 40)	8
South Korean Singles Chart	71
UK Singles Chart	128
US Billboard Pop Songs	36
US Billboard Adult Pop Songs	32
