= The Beauty in Ugly =

Promotional single by Jason Mraz

from the album Selections for Friends
- Released: 9 January 2007
- Recorded: 2006
- Genre: Alternative rock
- Length: 2:30
- Label: Atlantic
- Songwriter(s): Jason Mraz
- Producer(s): Jason Mraz

"The Beauty in Ugly" is a song recorded by Jason Mraz in support of the "Be Ugly '07" campaign that was created for the television show Ugly Betty. The music video was made to promote the show and the campaign. Mraz also did a Spanish version called "La Nueva Belleza".

== Track listing ==
Digital download

1. "The Beauty in Ugly" – 2:30

== Music video ==
The video starts with Jason Mraz singing with his guitar in a vacant office level while showing different shots of the television show Ugly Betty. The video then progresses to show "normal" people auditioning to be a model. Also seen is writing on the screen telling the audience what needs to be "fixed" with their image and style. The video then continues to show clips from the show and Mraz singing in the vacant office level. Toward the end of the video we get to see the before and after pictures of the people auditioning to be a model, until the people revert to what they really look like. The video continues to show the clips of the show and Mraz singing until the video fades to black.

== Charts ==
Chart performance for "The Beauty in Ugly"
| Chart (2007) | Peak position |
|---|---|
| Australia Digital Tracks (ARIA) | 22 |
| US Bubbling Under Hot 100 Singles (Billboard) | 15 |
