= We Sing. (EP) =

EP by Jason Mraz
- Released: March 18, 2008
- Genre: Rock
- Length: 19:05

Jason Mraz chronology
iTunes Live: London Sessions (2008)	We Sing. (2008)	We Dance. (2008)

We Sing. is the first EP of a three EP collection that was available for a limited time from the singer/songwriter Jason Mraz to help promote his third studio album, We Sing. We Dance. We Steal Things.. Physical copies of this EP are rare. It was mainly released for those who pre-ordered We Sing, We Dance, We Steal Things from JasonMraz.com. The EP was released on March 18, 2008. The EP is also included on the limited-edition version of We Sing. We Dance. We Steal Things. which was released on November 18, 2008. It peaked at number 101 on Billboard 200 on April 5, 2008.

== Track listing ==
No.	Title	Length
1.	"I'm Yours (From the Casa Nova Sessions)"	4:47
2.	"Live High (From an Avocado Salad Session)"	4:01
3.	"If It Kills Me (From the Casa Nova Sessions)"	5:00
4.	"A Beautiful Mess (From a Raining Jane Session)"	5:17

== Charts ==
Chart (2008)	Peak position
US Billboard 200	101
