= School of the Performing Arts in the Richmond Community =

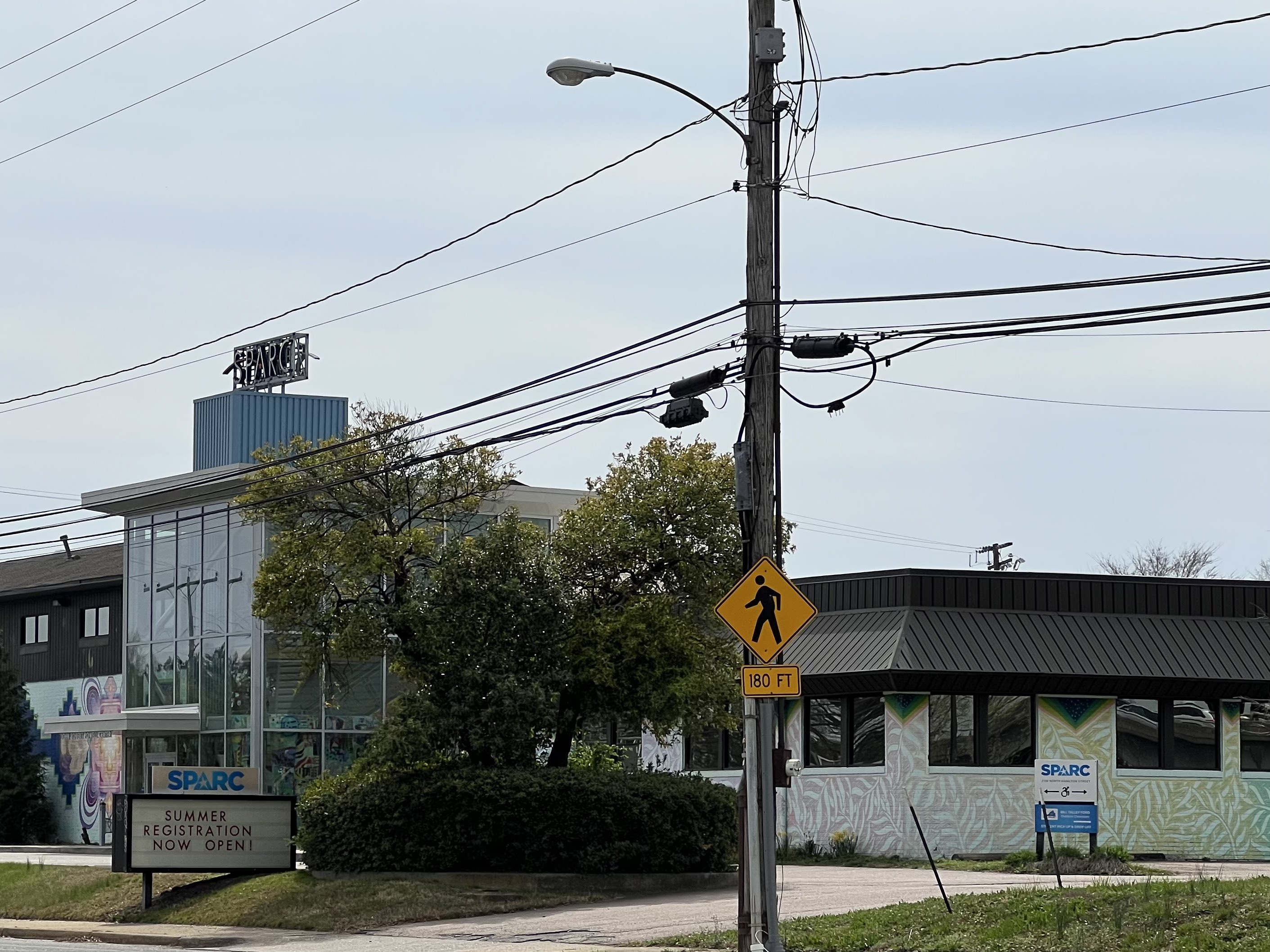
- SPARC building on Hamilton Street.

Location
- 2106-A N. Hamilton Street; Richmond, Virginia 23230; United States; 37.576838°N 77.475164°W

Information
- Funding type: 501(c)(3)
- Motto: "Setting the Stage for Life"
- Established: 1981
- Founder: Jeri Cutler-Voltz
- President: W. Jerrold Samford, P.G.
- Director: Ryan Ripperton
- Gender: Co-educational
- Age range: 3-18
- Tuition: $185- $535 per class
- Website: http://www.sparconline.org/

School of the Performing Arts in the Richmond Community (SPARC) is a school of performing arts established in Richmond, Virginia, United States in 1981. SPARC teaches children ages 3–18 in performing arts, such as singing, acting, and dancing.

== Notable alumni ==
- Jason Mraz
- Corey Bradley, Mamma Mia! National Tour
- Zak Resnick, Broadway actor
- Jason Marks, Broadway actor
- Emily Skinner, Broadway actor
- Mary Page Nance, Broadway actor
