= Look for the Good =

Studio album by Jason Mraz
- Released: June 19, 2020
- Genre: Reggae
- Length: 59:12
- Label: Interrabang; BMG
- Producer: Michael Goldwasser

Jason Mraz chronology
Know (2018)	Look for the Good (2020)	Mystical Magical Rhythmical Radical Ride (2023)

Singles from Look for the Good
- 1. "Look for the Good" Released: April 17, 2020; 2. "Wise Woman" Released: May 5, 2020; 3. "You Do You" Released: May 29, 2020

Look for the Good is the seventh studio album by American singer-songwriter Jason Mraz, released through Interrabang and BMG Rights Management on June 19, 2020. It was produced by Michael Goldwasser and preceded by the singles "Look for the Good", "Wise Woman" and "You Do You" (featuring Tiffany Haddish).

== Critical reception ==
Professional ratings
Review scores
Source	Rating
AllMusic	3/5 stars
PopMatters	6/10

Stephen Thomas Erlewine of AllMusic commented that "Mraz is supported by an empathetic crew of studio pros who help him add shade and texture to his anthems of love and good vibe", including producer and co-founder of Easy Star Records, Michael Goldwasser. Erlewine pointed out that "the album is loosely structured into a side of socially minded tunes and a side of party tunes and ditties about love" but that "over the course of a full album, his relentless positivity can seem cloying". Andy Jurik of PopMatters wrote that the album "offers good vibe escapism that feels almost surreal in 2020" and is "steeped in reggae and backbeat vibes" with an "earthier, groove-orientated vibe" than his previous work. Jurik concluded that while "an unavoidably endearing record, [...] considering the verbal skills of its creator, it feels like a lost opportunity for something wittier and deeper

David Gill of Riff Magazine wrote that "Mraz seems to genuinely understand and admire the positivity of artists like Bob Marley and Peter Tosh. The bad news is that his new album lacks both the political gravitas and the sense of spiritual authenticity earned through suffering and struggle that made those artists great."

== Track listing ==
No.	Title	Writer(s)	Length
1.	"Look for the Good"	Jason Mraz; Michael Goldwasser; Chaska Potter; Mai Sunshine Bloomfield; Mona Tavakoli; Rebecca Gebhardt; Abby Dorsey; Jeff Berkley	5:09
2.	"Make Love"	Mraz; Dorsey; Andre De Sant'anna; Michael Natter; Nancy Natter; Marcel Camargo; Leo Costa	5:34
3.	"My Kind"	Mraz; Potter	4:55
4.	"Good Old Daze"	Mraz; Mike Daly	4:11
5.	"You Do You" (featuring Tiffany Haddish)	Mraz; Dorsey; Potter; Tavakoli; Bloomfield; Gebhardt; De Sant'anna; Costa; Brandon Coleman; Tiffany Haddish	4:35
6.	"Wise Woman"	Mraz; Potter; N. Natter	4:40
7.	"Take the Music"	Mraz; Tavakoli; Bloomfield; Gebhardt; Potter; Billy Galewood	5:48
8.	"Time Out" (featuring Sister Carol)	Mraz; Tavakoli; Bloomfield; Gebhardt; Potter; Sister Carol	5:09
9.	"DJ FM AM JJason"	Mraz; Goldwasser; Dorsey; Bloomfield; Gebhardt; Potter; Tavakoli	4:24
10.	"Hearing Double"	Mraz	3:03
11.	"The Minute I Heard of Love"	Mraz	4:47
12.	"Gratitude"	Mraz; Martin Terefe; Sacha Skarbek; Matt Morris; Daly	6:57
Total length:			59:12

== Personnel ==
Musicians

- Rob Baker – choir vocals
- Tamir Barzilay – drums, percussion
- Mai Sunshine Bloomfield – choir vocals
- Sister Carol – vocals
- Fernando Castillo – trumpet
- Connie Corn – choir vocals
- Renea Flenoid – choir vocals
- Shardie Flenoid – choir vocals
- Cristian Gamez – turntables
- Becky Gebhardt – choir vocals, sitar
- Michael Goldwasser – guitar, synthesizer, bass, drums, percussion, vocals
- Sivan Goldwasser – choir vocals
- Tali Goldwasser – choir vocals
- Tiffany Haddish – vocals
- John "Asher" Henry – drums, percussion
- Jerry Lindahl – choir vocals
- Chiquis Lozoya – bass
- Daniel Mandelman – piano, clavinet, synthesizer
- Molly Miller – guitar
- Jason Mraz – vocals, guitar
- Chaska Potter – choir vocals
- Andy Powers – guitar
- Roger Rivas – organ
- Andre De Sant'anna – drums, percussion
- Carlos Sosa – saxophone
- Maria Spicer-Walker – choir vocals
- Stephen Suckarie – guitar
- Mona Tavakoli – choir vocals, drums, percussion
- Raul Vallejo – trombone

Technical personnel

- Michael Goldwasser – producer, additional engineering
- Jeff Berkley – engineer
- Scott Jacoby – mixing
- Robbie Robinson – mastering
- James Berkley – assistant engineer
- Mike Sabri – additional engineering (5)
- Paul "Computer Paul" Henton – additional engineering (8)
- Matthew Gibbs – production assistant
- Greg Stanley – production assistant
- Zack Erickson – assistant mix engineer

== Charts ==
Chart performance for Look for the Good
Chart (2020)	Peak position
Belgian Albums (Ultratop Flanders)	169
Belgian Albums (Ultratop Wallonia)	182
Swiss Albums (Schweizer Hitparade)	77
US Top Album Sales (Billboard)	25
