= Two Spot Gobi =

English alternative rock band

- Origin: Brighton, England
- Genre: Alternative rock
- Years active: 2005–2012
- Label: Indie
- Members: James Robinson; Rob Lewis; Dino Randhawa; Ben Daniel; Matt Ellis; Ben Matthews; Matt Harris
- Website: www.twospot.co.uk

Two Spot Gobi were an English alternative rock band from Brighton, England. The lineup included lead singer James Robinson, cellist Rob Lewis, bassist Matt Harris, guitarist Dino Randhawa, trumpeter Matt Ellis and drummer Ben Matthews.

== Career ==
Shortly after the band formed, Jason Mraz stumbled upon Two Spot Gobi playing at a bar in Plymouth on his day off from supporting James Blunt. He fell in love with their upbeat vibe and later invited them to open for him at a few shows in Brighton, UK in the summer of 2007. In the fall of 2008, following further exposure from Perez Hilton, Mraz invited the band to join him on his US tour, and then again on his European tour in 2009. In the summer of 2009, the invitation extended to record at Mraz's home studio in San Diego. Two Spot Gobi spent two months recording their second studio album The Sun Will Rise (2010) with producer Niko Bolas (Neil Young, John Mayer), assisted by Andre De Santanna. Two Spot Gobi have also consistently toured the UK on their own headline shows.

The first Two Spot Gobi EP was recorded in 2005 at the University of Sussex. It was a self-recorded EP containing the tracks: "Melodious Star", "That Thing", "Borrowed Time", "Lucky 7" and "Mr Man". Never officially released, but it was the collection of songs that won Two Spot Gobi an initial fanbase. The Hey Now EP was recorded in the early 2006 at Sawmills Studios in Cornwall. It was produced and engineered by Tom Joyce. Tracks included "Regulations", "Let's Get Lost", "Hey Now", "Senses" and a live version of "A Difference". Their Outside EP was recorded in early 2007 at the University of Glamorgan in Wales and was produced and engineered by Samuel Adebayo (EMI). The tracks were mixed by Mike Pelanconi (Lily Allen) and included "Outside", "Four Walls", "Mr Man", and "Better Days".

The Otherside of the World EP featured the 2008 single, "Sunshine Lady", released on UK Indie label IRL, a live version of "Let's Get Lost" featuring Jason Mraz (mixed by Max Gilkes) and two live versions of "Innocent" and "Otherside of the World". Perez Hilton, described 'Sunshine Lady' as his "perfect summer jam"

Their debut album, Everywhere You Should Have Been (produced by former Republica guitarist Johnny Male) was released in the US in October 2008 and, in the UK, in April 2009 on US label Musik1.

The Sun Will Rise was the band's second studio album, and released on 16 May 2011. The album included the single "You Make It Easy", which was released in June 2010, as well as the single "Guiding Star", which was released in February 2011.
