= Curbside Prophet =

2004 single by Jason Mraz

Single by Jason Mraz

from the album Waiting for My Rocket to Come
- Released: February 23, 2004
- Genre: Pop rock, alternative hip hop
- Length: 3:34
- Label: Elektra
- Songwriter(s): Jason Mraz, Billy Galewood, Christina Ruffalo

Jason Mraz singles chronology
"You and I Both" (2003)	"Curbside Prophet" (2004)	"Wordplay" (2005)

"Curbside Prophet" is a song by Jason Mraz. It was released as part of his first major studio album, Waiting for My Rocket to Come, which is one of the lyrics of this song. Mraz credits rap group Jurassic 5 as being part of the inspiration for the story of his travels across the U.S. in pursuit of a music career.

The song was remixed with additional and modified lyrics for the 2004 film New York Minute. The song's name was changed to "Curbside Prophet '04" on the New York Minute soundtrack.

There was no music video filmed for the song other than a live performance recorded at the Eagles Ballroom with John Popper of Blues Traveler on blues harp. This live recording was used for the song's music video.

== Track listing ==
1. "Curbside Prophet" (Radio version) – 3:29
2. "Curbside Prophet" (Live from the Eagles Ballroom feat. John Popper) [Edit] – 4:02
3. "Curbside Prophet" (Live from the Eagles Ballroom feat. John Popper) [Full version] – 5:10
4. "Curbside Prophet" (Live video)

== Charts ==
Chart (2004)	Peak position
US Adult Pop Airplay (Billboard)	23
