= Waiting for My Rocket to Come =

Studio album by Jason Mraz
- Released: October 15, 2002
- Recorded: 2001–2002
- Genre: Pop rock
- Length: 48:28
- Label: Elektra
- Producer: John Alagía

Jason Mraz chronology
The E Minor EP in F (2002)	Waiting for My Rocket to Come (2002)	Tonight, Not Again: Jason Mraz Live at the Eagles Ballroom (2004)

Singles from Waiting for My Rocket To Come
- 1. "The Remedy (I Won't Worry)" Released: January 27, 2003; 2. "You and I Both" Released: June 16, 2003; 3. "Curbside Prophet" Released: February 23, 2004

Professional ratings
Review scores
Source	Rating
Allmusic	3/5 stars
Christgau's Consumer Guide	(2-star Honorable Mention)
The Guardian	2/5 stars
Resident Advisor	3.0/5
Rolling Stone	3/5 stars
Slant	2.5/5 stars

Waiting for My Rocket to Come is the debut studio album by American singer-songwriter Jason Mraz, released on October 15, 2002, by Elektra Records. It was his only studio release on that label before he moved to Atlantic Records. By December 2003, the album had sold 500,000 copies, prompting Entertainment Weekly to dub Mraz "The winner of 2003’s sensitive singer-songwriter sweepstakes". The album's commercial success occurred partly because of its successful Top 40 single "The Remedy (I Won't Worry)", as well as Mraz's energetic live performances and extensive self-promotion.

Mraz said the title was optimistic, reflecting the process of playing music while simultaneously preparing for success while waiting for success to arrive.

== Track listing ==
All tracks are written by Jason Mraz, except where noted.

No.	Title	Writer(s)	Length
1.	"You and I Both"		3:39
2.	"I'll Do Anything"	Mraz; Billy "Bushwalla" Galewood	3:11
3.	"The Remedy (I Won't Worry)"	Mraz; Lauren Christy; Graham Edwards; Scott Spock	4:16
4.	"Who Needs Shelter"	Mraz; Chris Keup; Eric Schermerhorn	3:12
5.	"Curbside Prophet"	Mraz; Galewood; Christina Ruffalo	3:34
6.	"Sleep All Day"		4:56
7.	"Too Much Food"		3:41
8.	"Absolutely Zero"		5:39
9.	"On Love, In Sadness"	Mraz; Jenny Keene	3:28
10.	"No Stopping Us"		3:18
11.	"The Boy's Gone"		4:15
12.	"Tonight, Not Again"	Mraz; Keene	4:49

Japanese edition bonus track
No.	Title	Writer(s)	Length
13.	"Tonight, Not Again" (Live version)	Mraz; Keene

== Personnel ==
- Jason Mraz – lead vocals on all tracks, acoustic guitar on all tracks, backing vocals on tracks 3 and 6

Additional personnel

- John Alagía – Hammond organ on tracks 1, 2, 6, 8 and 12, electric guitar on track 3, tambourine on tracks 1, 2, 3, 6 and 12, shaker on tracks 1, 3 and 6, Wurlitzer on tracks 3 and 6, Record producer on all tracks, mixing on all tracks
- Brian Jones – drums on all tracks
- Stewart Myers – bass guitar on all tracks
- Michael Andrews – electric guitar on tracks 1, 2, 3, 4, 5, 6, 7, 8, 9, 10 and 12, acoustic guitar on track 3, slide guitar on tracks 1 and 5, lap steel guitar on tracks 6, 7, 8 and 9, banjo on track 5, celesta on track 4, ukulele on tracks 4, 6 and 9, mellotron on track 4, horn arrangement on track 10
- Greg Kurstin – organ on tracks 2, 3, 7, 9 and 11, clavinet on tracks 2, 7 and 10, synthesizer on tracks 3 and 12, electric piano on tracks 3 and 6, Rhodes piano on track 10
- Alex McCallum – electric guitar on tracks 2, 9, 10 and 11, acoustic guitar on track 4, ebo on tracks 4, 8 and 12, synthesizer on tracks 8 and 10, Wurlitzer on track 10
- Noel "Toca" Rivera – backing vocals on tracks 3 and 6, tambourine on track 9, djembe on track 12
- Julie "Hesta Prynn" Potash – backing vocals on track 5
- Carla Dekker – backing vocals on track 5
- Geannie Meisenholder – backing vocals on track 5
- Nicki Bateson – backing vocals on track 5
- Shane Endsley – trumpet on tracks 10 and 12
- Scot Ray – trombone on track 10
- Ben Wendel – saxophone on track 10
- Guy Hilsman – shaker on track 12
- Jeff Juliano – mixing on all tracks, engineering on all tracks
- Peter Harding – engineering assistance on all tracks
- Chris Keup – pre-production on all tracks, arrangement assistance on all tracks
- Ted Jensen – mastering on all tracks

== Charts ==
=== Weekly charts ===
Chart (2002–2003)	Peak position
Australian Albums (ARIA)	61
New Zealand Albums (RMNZ)	35
US Billboard 200	55
US Heatseekers Albums (Billboard)	2

=== Year-end charts ===
Chart (2003)	Position
US Billboard 200	150

== Certifications ==
Region	Certification	Certified units/sales
United States (RIAA)	Platinum	1,000,000^{^}
^{^} Shipments figures based on certification alone.
