= Mystical Magical Rhythmical Radical Ride =

Studio album by Jason Mraz
- Released: June 23, 2023
- Genre: Pop; disco
- Length: 41:03
- Label: Interrabang; BMG
- Producer: Martin Terefe

Jason Mraz chronology
Look for the Good (2020)	Mystical Magical Rhythmical Radical Ride (2023)

Singles from Mystical Magical Rhythmical Radical Ride
- 1. "I Feel Like Dancing" Released: February 15, 2023; 2. "Pancakes & Butter" Released: May 3, 2023

Mystical Magical Rhythmical Radical Ride is the eighth studio album by American singer-songwriter Jason Mraz, released through Interrabang and BMG Rights Management on June 23, 2023. It was produced by Martin Terefe and preceded by the singles "I Feel Like Dancing" and "Pancakes & Butter". It is his first album since Look for the Good (2020).

== Background ==
The album was described as both Mraz's "return to pop" and as containing "dance and disco influences", which Mraz called the integration of a "conscious effort" as he had "not yet done". Mraz elaborated, "I wanted to try to get a little more into the dance lane, because I haven't experienced that before. I wanted to try something new."

== Tour ==
On February 15, 2023, Mraz announced a 23-city United States tour to support the album, beginning on July 13 at Edgefield in Troutdale, Oregon and finishing on August 17 at Queens' Forest Hills Stadium with the New York Pops. Grooveline Horns, Raining Jane and Molly Miller were announced as supporting acts. On October 23, Mraz announced a second leg of his tour for 2024, starting on July 5 at the Hartford HealthCare Amphitheatre in Bridgeport, Connecticut and ending on August 11 at The Rady Shell at Jacobs Park in San Diego, with the Colorado Symphony and the San Diego Symphony as supporting acts on select dates.

== Critical reception ==
Professional ratings
Review scores
Source	Rating
Riff Magazine	7/10

Sarah Verschoor of Riff Magazine called the album "cleverly crafted and melodically mesmerizing" and felt it "beams with authenticity", and Mraz's "smooth and warm vocals work very well with this modern take on the era of uptempo dance".

== Track listing ==
Mystical Magical Rhythmical Radical Ride track listing
No.	Title	Writer(s)	Length
1.	"Getting Started"	Jason Mraz	3:39
2.	"I Feel Like Dancing"	Mraz; Mai Bloomfield; Abby Dorsey; Chris DeStefano; Rebecca Gebhardt; Stephenie Jones; Chaska Potter; Mona Tavakoli; Francis White	3:38
3.	"Feel Good Too"	Mraz; Bloomfield; Gebhardt; Michael Natter; Nancy Natter; Potter; Martin Terefe; Tavakoli	3:59
4.	"Pancakes & Butter"	Mraz; Bloomfield; Gebhardt; Molly Miller; Potter; Tavakoli	3:51
5.	"Disco Sun"	Mraz; Bloomfield; Gebhardt; Potter; Tavakoli	5:05
6.	"Irony of Loneliness"	Mraz; Bloomfield; Gebhardt; Rupi Kaur; Potter; Tavakoli	3:59
7.	"Little Time"	Mraz; Bloomfield; Gebhardt; Potter; Tavakoli	4:54
8.	"You Might Like It"	Mraz; Bloomfield; Gebhardt; Potter; Tavakoli	3:37
9.	"Lovesick Romeo"	Mraz; Bloomfield; Gebhardt; Potter; Tavakoli	3:53
10.	"If You Think You've Seen It All"	Mraz; M. Natter; N. Natter	4:28
Total length:			41:03

== Personnel ==
Musicians

- Jason Mraz – vocals (all tracks), piano (tracks 1, 2, 5–8), synthesizer (1–7, 10), drum programming (3)
- Becky Gebhardt – bass guitar (all tracks), bass synthesizer (1, 5, 6, 8), sitar (3, 5, 8)
- Mai Bloomfield – vocals, cello (all tracks); string arrangement (4), acoustic guitar (7)
- Chaska Potter – vocals (all tracks), percussion (1, 2, 10), electric guitar (3, 5, 6), lap steel guitar (9)
- Mona Tavakoli – vocals, percussion (all tracks); drums (3, 6, 7, 9, 10)
- Martin Terefe – electronics (1–3, 5, 10), percussion (2), Wurlitzer (9)
- Nikolai Torp – keyboards, synthesizer (1–3, 5)
- Molly Miller – electric guitar (1, 3, 5)
- Noah Terefe – drum programming, synthesizer (1, 3)
- Carole Rabinowitz – cello (1, 4, 6, 8, 10)
- David Davidson – string arrangement, violin (1, 4, 6, 8, 10)
- Kristin Wilkinson – viola (1, 4, 6, 8, 10)
- Dave Angell – violin (1, 4, 6, 8, 10)
- Raul Vallejo – trombone (2, 3, 6)
- Fernando Castillo – trumpet (2, 3, 6)
- Sterling Campbell – drums (2, 4, 5, 8)
- Toca Rivera – vocals (2)
- Carlos Sosa – flute, saxophone (3, 6)
- Glen Scott – electric piano (4), Wurlitzer (7)

Technical

- Martin Terefe – production
- Chris Gehringer – mastering
- David K. Younghyun – mixing
- Tony Maserati – mixing
- Gabriella Wayne – engineering
- Harry Backer – engineering
- Hayden Easterling – engineering
- Oliver Liu – engineering
- Oskar Winberg – engineering
- Riketté Genesis – engineering
- Taylor Pollert – engineering
- Tim Brennan – engineering
- Julia Norelli – mixing assistance
- Najeeb Jones – mixing assistance

== Charts ==
Chart performance for Mystical Magical Rhythmical Radical Ride
Chart (2023)	Peak position
Japanese Digital Albums (Oricon)	20
Japanese Hot Albums (Billboard Japan)	44
Swiss Albums (Schweizer Hitparade)	100
UK Album Downloads (OCC)	39
UK Independent Albums (OCC)	13
US Top Album Sales (Billboard)	23
