= Lucky (Jason Mraz and Colbie Caillat song) =

2009 single by Jason Mraz and Colbie Caillat

Single by Jason Mraz and Colbie Caillat

from the album We Sing. We Dance. We Steal Things.
- B-side: "Butterfly" (live from Highline Ballroom)
- Released: January 13, 2009
- Recorded: 2008
- Studio: Kensaltown Studios (London, England)
- Genre: Folk-pop
- Length: 3:10
- Label: Atlantic
- Songwriters: Jason Mraz; Colbie Caillat; Timothy Fagan
- Producer: Martin Terefe

Jason Mraz singles chronology
"Make It Mine" (2008)	"Lucky" (2009)	"I Won't Give Up" (2012)

Colbie Caillat singles chronology
"Somethin' Special" (2008)	"Lucky" (2009)	"Fallin' for You" (2009)

"Lucky" is a duet song recorded by American singer-songwriters, Jason Mraz and Colbie Caillat. It was issued on January 13, 2009, as the third single from Mraz's third studio album, We Sing. We Dance. We Steal Things (2008). The song also appears as a bonus track on the international edition of Caillat’s album Breakthrough, and has been on the Billboard charts, as well as other music charts worldwide. The lyrics tells about two best friends who fall in love while living in a long-distance relationship.

A Spanish version of the song, called "Suerte", was recorded alongside Mexican singer Ximena Sariñana for the Latin American and Spanish re-edition of the album. Mraz and Caillat won the 2010 Grammy Award for Best Pop Collaboration with Vocals. Mraz and Lil Wayne also did a remix of the song "Lucky" and later was released on Z100. Brooke Elliott performed a karaoke version of the song on a 2009 episode of Drop Dead Diva. Dianna Agron and Chord Overstreet performed the song on a 2010 episode of Glee.

== Conception and performances ==
Mraz became a fan of Caillat after hearing her music on MySpace. He then called her to see if she'd want to write and sing together. In an interview with VH1, Mraz stated that he "played a songwriting game" with friends to see how the lyrics would go. Mraz and Caillat performed the song on Saturday Night Live on January 31, 2009. They performed the song again on The Ellen DeGeneres Show in February.

== Chart performance ==
"Lucky" debuted on the Billboard Hot 100 at number 96 for the issue dated January 31, 2009. On the same week it had a debut on the Pop 100 chart at 84 and moved to a peak of 48. The next week the song rose to number 84 on the Hot 100 and peaked at number 48. On the Hot Adult Top 40 Tracks, the song was a Top 10 hit, reaching #9.

The song has also charted on the Dutch Top 40 at number 27 and moved to peak of 8.

On the Canadian Hot 100 charted on 70 and moved to 56. The song re-entered on the Canadian Charts on the issue of April 30, 2009 at #99.

It also charted on the Swiss Singles Chart charts at 34 but started going down the following weeks.

== Music video ==
The music video was directed by Darren Doane. It was filmed in Prague, Czech Republic and on the island of Kauai in Hawaii, in December 2008. The video premiered on January 16, 2009. Mraz and Caillat's parts in the video were filmed separately. The video follows the context of the song, featuring Mraz and Caillat singing their verses.

The video starts with a shot of Old Town city square in Prague. Mraz is shown getting ready to meet somebody. Caillat is in a hilly seaside area in Hawaii and sits on the beach as the song starts. Mraz gets ready and goes out to the square. Caillat continues to sing the song walking beside the sea and playing with her scarf. Mraz and Caillat sing the song with both in separate places. Scenes are interspersed with the scene of a car zooming inside and Mraz ultimately reaches Old Town Square in Prague and stands in front of the Jan Hus Memorial Statue. Both Mraz and Caillat look back and the video ends with the implication that both of them see one another.

== Charts ==
=== Weekly charts ===
Chart (2009)	Peak position
Austria (Ö3 Austria Top 40)	44
Belgium (Ultratip Bubbling Under Flanders)	5
Belgium (Ultratop 50 Wallonia)	12
Canada Hot 100 (Billboard)	56
Canada AC (Billboard)	14
Canada Hot AC (Billboard)	45
Czech IFPI Radio Top 100	62
Germany (GfK)	22
Hungary (Editors' Choice Top 40)	40
Netherlands (Dutch Top 40)	8
Netherlands (Single Top 100)	10
South Korea International Singles (Downloads) (Gaon)	24
Spain (Promusicae)	43
Switzerland (Schweizer Hitparade)	21
UK Singles (Official Charts Company)	149
US Billboard Hot 100	48
US Adult Alternative Airplay (Billboard)	18
US Adult Contemporary (Billboard)	10
US Adult Pop Airplay (Billboard)	9
US Smooth Jazz Airplay (Billboard)	24

=== Monthly charts ===
Chart (2009)	Position
Brazil (Brasil Hot 100 Airplay)	54

=== Year-end charts ===
Chart (2009)	Position
Belgium (Ultratop Wallonia)	61
Brazil (Crowley)	41
Netherlands (Dutch Top 40)	49
Netherlands (Single Top 100)	63
Switzerland (Schweizer Hitparade)	69
US Adult Contemporary (Billboard)	28
US Adult Top 40 (Billboard)	35

== Certifications ==
Region	Certification	Certified units/sales
Canada (Music Canada)	3× Platinum	240,000^{‡}
Denmark (IFPI Danmark)	Gold	45,000^{‡}
New Zealand (RMNZ)	2× Platinum	60,000^{‡}
Spain (Promusicae)	Gold	30,000^{‡}
United Kingdom (BPI)	Gold	400,000^{‡}
United States (RIAA)	4× Platinum	4,000,000^{‡}
^{‡} Sales+streaming figures based on certification alone.

== Release history ==
Release dates and formats for "Lucky"
Region	Date	Format	Label(s)	Ref.
United States	April 7, 2009	Mainstream airplay	Atlantic	

== Spanish version ==
Along with Ximena Sariñana, Jason released a Spanish version of the song "Lucky". The video for the Spanish version has both her and Mraz in it, and it was released to MTV on June 22, 2009.
