= You and I Both =

2003 single by Jason Mraz

Single by Jason Mraz

from the album Waiting for My Rocket to Come
- B-side: "Common Pleasure" (live)
- Released: June 16, 2003
- Length: 3:39
- Label: Elektra
- Songwriter: Jason Mraz
- Producer: John Alagía

Jason Mraz singles chronology
"The Remedy (I Won't Worry)" (2003)	"You and I Both" (2003)	"Curbside Prophet" (2004)

"You and I Both" is a song by American musician Jason Mraz, released as the second single from his debut album, Waiting for My Rocket to Come (2002), on June 16, 2003. The song gave Mraz his second number-one single on the US Billboard Triple-A chart and peaked at number 10 on the Billboard Bubbling Under Hot 100. The song's music video shows Mraz attempting to woo a bank teller.

== Music video ==
The video begins with Mraz in a bank, waiting in line to deposit the coins in his piggy bank. He sees the teller (Lizzy Caplan of CBS's The Class, Mean Girls, and Cloverfield) and instantly falls in love with her. He tries several times to get her as his teller and fails on all counts, first spilling the coins from his piggy bank, then cutting in line only to have her close her window just as he gets to it. After multiple attempts, Mraz finally manages to reach the teller and passes a note reading, "Give me what I want ♥".

The bank's manager walks over and, thinking the note signals an attempted robbery, pushes the alarm button. Security lights flash and papers begin to fly around the bank, while the customers and staff begin to dance. The police arrive and they too join the dance before escorting Mraz out in handcuffs, slamming him against the hood of the police car. The teller comes running out of the bank and watches him being taken away.

Now sharing a jail cell, a bereft Mraz doodles on the walls and pines away the hours. Ultimately, he returns to the bank to find the teller. He looks in the window and does not see her, but he turns around to find she has pulled up in a car behind him. He gets in and they drive away together, and the video ends with heart frame around the car as it drives away, with the words "The End" flashing across the screen.

== Track listing ==
Australian CD single

1. "You and I Both" (album version)
2. "Common Pleasure" (live)
3. "You and I Both" (live)
4. "Rainbow Connection" (live video)

== Credits and personnel ==
Credits are lifted from the Waiting for My Rocket to Come album booklet.

Studios

- Mixed at The Crabtrap (Easton, Maryland)
- Engineered at Dragonfly Studios (Haymarket, Virginia) and The Crabtrap (Easton, Maryland)
- Mastered at Sterling Sound (New York City)

Personnel

- Jason Mraz – music, lyrics, vocals, acoustic guitar
- Michael Andrews – electric guitars, acoustic slide guitar
- Stewart Myers – bass guitar
- John Alagia – B3, shaker, tambourine
- Brian Jones – drums
- John Alagía – production, mixing
- Chris Keup – preproduction, arrangement assistance
- Jeff Juliano – mixing, engineering
- Peter Harding – second engineer
- Ted Jensen – mastering

== Charts ==
=== Weekly charts ===
Chart (2003–2004)	Peak position
Australia Hitseekers (ARIA)	12
US Bubbling Under Hot 100 (Billboard)	10
US Adult Alternative Airplay (Billboard)	1
US Adult Pop Airplay (Billboard)	15
US Pop Airplay (Billboard)	37

=== Year-end charts ===
Chart (2003)	Position
US Adult Top 40 (Billboard)	99
US Triple-A (Billboard)	16

Chart (2004)	Position
US Adult Top 40 (Billboard)	40

== Certifications ==
Region	Certification	Certified units/sales
United States (RIAA)	Gold	500,000^{‡}
^{‡} Sales+streaming figures based on certification alone.

== Release history ==
Region	Date	Format	Label	Ref.
United States	June 16, 2003	Triple A radio	Elektra	
United States	September 22, 2003	Hot adult contemporary radio	Elektra	
United States	November 3, 2003	Contemporary hit radio	Elektra	
Australia	February 9, 2004	CD	Warner Music Australia	

== Covers ==
The song was covered by Dean Saunders, winner of the third season of Popstars Netherlands. The song was released as his debut solo single and reached number four on the Dutch Top 40.
