= Bushwalla =

American rapper

Billy Galewood
- Born: William Galewood; Cleveland, Ohio, United States
- Origin: formerly Bushwalla
- Genres: Funk music, R&B
- Occupations: Singer, songwriter
- Website: BillyGalewood.com

Billy Galewood is an American singer, songwriter and rapper from Cleveland, Ohio.

At the age of nine, Billy entered a youth theater group called "Kids on Broadway". Ten years later Billy migrated to New York City, where he studied musical theater at the American Musical and Dramatic Academy. There he met Jason Mraz at a party and they subsequently became roommates. After years of honing their own musicianship, the two then moved from New York to Mraz's native Virginia, then California where they performed together as often as they could. Among their collaborations is "Curbside Prophet", a track from Mraz's album Waiting for My Rocket to Come.

Billy eventually ended up in California where he continued to hone his eclectic acoustic/hip-hop sound. Known for his freestyle skills on the microphone, Billy has toured extensively throughout the U.S., independently releasing his album Ghetto Blaster, which features the likes of Spooner Oldham, Speechwriters LLC, and Jason Mraz’s rhythm section. Billy's shows blend hip-hop, acoustic rock, funk, improvisation and comedy. His performances also incorporate circus tricks such as hula hooping, fire breathing, face balancing, juggling and balloon art.

Throughout 2006, Billy and his band had a regular gig every Sunday at Twiggs Coffeehouse in San Diego. These Sunday shows quickly garnered cult-status, as Billy always had special guests with him on stage, including Mraz, Aaron Leibowitz, Ainslie Henderson, Toca Rivera, and many more.

In 2006, Billy traveled around the country to people's houses for private Living Room Concerts (LRCs). Billy (as Bushwalla) formed the 1-2-3 Band with around 10 of his closest friends. Their live performances were dynamic, very spontaneous and extremely humorous. Mraz was an unofficial member of the band, and often joined them on stage. In April 2008, Billy was part of the Music, Magic, Make Peace Tour with headliner Jason Mraz, The Makepeace Brothers and magician Justin Willman. He subsequently toured with Jason Mraz in 2009 playing for thousands of people.

Autodidactical Freestyle and Radical and the Old Street Ep were released in 2007 and 2008. The Man Who Invented the Sky was released in summer 2010.

Billy tours constantly throughout the US, Europe, Australia and Asia.

Billy released his last album "Ordinary Tales of Madness", and simultaneously retired the name Bushwalla in September 2016.

== Discography ==
- GhettoBlaster EP
- Autodidactical Freestyle and Radical
- Old Street EP
- The Man Who Invented the Sky
- Ordinary Tales Of Madness
