= Make It Mine =

Single by Jason Mraz

from the album We Sing. We Dance. We Steal Things.
- Released: August 8, 2008
- Genre: Jazz-Pop
- Length: 3:06
- Label: Atlantic
- Songwriter: Jason Mraz

Jason Mraz singles chronology
"I'm Yours" (2008)	"Make It Mine" (2008)	"Lucky" (2009)

"Make It Mine" is a song by Jason Mraz. It is the second single from his third studio album We Sing. We Dance. We Steal Things. released September 2, 2008.

The song was featured on the season three premiere of the dramatic television series Brothers & Sisters on September 28, 2008.

The song won Best Male Pop Vocal Performance at the 52nd Grammy Awards.

== Track listing ==
Digital download

1. "Make It Mine" – 3:06

CD single

1. "Make It Mine" – 3:06
2. "Make It Mine" (Video) – 3:12

== Music video ==
Mraz made two different videos for this song.

The first music video for the song starts with Mraz waking up in the morning and starting the day. Throughout the video it shows him in various locations, such as at a desk writing and crumpling paper, playing in the water, and sitting in the water with his friend and bandmate Toca Rivera.

The second version was shot in Munich and Amsterdam, picturing famous sites as the Grachten, Melkweg, Viktualienmarkt, Englischer Garten and the Eisbach. Mraz is seen bicycling, surfing on the Eisbach wave, eating ice cream on the Viktualienmarkt and performing in the Melkweg club.

== Charts ==
=== Weekly charts ===
Chart (2008–09)	Peak position
Belgium (Ultratip Bubbling Under Flanders)	11
Belgium (Ultratip Bubbling Under Wallonia)	2
Germany (GfK)	100
Italian Airplay (EarOne)	38
Netherlands (Dutch Top 40)	8
Netherlands (Single Top 100)	48
Sweden (Sverigetopplistan)	24
UK Singles (Official Charts)	82

=== Year-end charts ===
Chart (2009)	Position
Netherlands (Dutch Top 40)	47
