= The Remedy (I Won't Worry) =

2003 single by Jason Mraz

Single by Jason Mraz

from the album Waiting for My Rocket to Come
- B-side: "Tonight, Not Again" (live)
- Released: January 27, 2003
- Genre: Pop rock; blue-eyed soul
- Length: 4:16 (album version); 3:22 (radio edit)
- Label: Elektra
- Songwriters: Jason Mraz; Lauren Christy; Scott Spock; Graham Edwards
- Producer: John Alagía

Jason Mraz singles chronology
"The Remedy (I Won't Worry)" (2003)	"You and I Both" (2003)

"The Remedy (I Won't Worry)" is the debut single of American singer-songwriter Jason Mraz from his debut album, Waiting for My Rocket to Come (2002). Written by Mraz and production team the Matrix (Lauren Christy, Scott Spock, and Graham Edwards), the song is about a good friend of Mraz's, Charlie Mingroni, being struck with cancer and how it changed Mraz's outlook on life. Occasionally, while performing this song during his shows, Mraz would include a singalong with the audience to Oasis's "Wonderwall".

Released on January 27, 2003, "The Remedy" was Mraz's first top-40 hit, reaching number 15 on the US Billboard Hot 100; he would not have a second until 2008's "I'm Yours". The song also reached number 32 in New Zealand and became a minor hit in Australia, the Netherlands, and the United Kingdom.

== Composition ==
Sheet music for the song shows the key of B-flat major.

== Music video ==
The video, directed by Dean Karr, starts with Jason Mraz performing a concert. He then walks (in dog slippers) on some sort of farm. He then grabs a set of car keys and gets in his "Mrazda" (1962 Buick LeSabre 4 door hardtop). He then calls a whole bunch of roosters to get in the car. He pulls away from the farm and begins to drive through a neighborhood. He continues to perform on stage. He then walks on a sidewalk, where he makes eye contact with a girl holding a basket of eggs. The girl slips on a banana peel and drops all of the eggs. He continues to walk on the sidewalk. While walking, he grabs a flower from the ground and slips the flower into the barrel of a soldier's gun. He then runs into two twin boys and he lets them try on his red hat. He continues to perform and the camera switches back and forth between all previous shots. The video ends with him getting out of his car and he tips his hat towards the camera.

== Track listings ==
UK CD single

1. "The Remedy (I Won't Worry)" (radio edit) – 3:22
2. "Tonight, Not Again" (live) – 4:24
3. "The Remedy (I Won't Worry)" (live) – 3:48

UK 7-inch single

A. "The Remedy (I Won't Worry)" (radio edit) – 3:22
B. "Tonight, Not Again" (live) – 4:24

Australian CD single

1. "The Remedy (I Won't Worry)" (album version)
2. "Tonight, Not Again" (live)
3. "Curbside Prophet" (live)
4. "The Remedy (I Won't Worry)" (live)

== Credits and personnel ==
Credits are taken from the UK CD single liner notes and the Waiting for My Rocket to Come album booklet.

Studios

- Mixed at The Crabtrap (Easton, Maryland)
- Engineered at Dragonfly Studios (Haymarket, Virginia) and The Crabtrap (Easton, Maryland)
- Mastered at Sterling Sound (New York City)

Personnel

- Jason Mraz – music, lyrics, vocals, backing vocals, acoustic guitars
- Lauren Christy – music, lyrics
- Scott Spock – music, lyrics
- Graham Edwards – music, lyrics
- Toca Rivera – backing vocals
- Michael Andrews – acoustic guitar, electric guitar
- John Alagía – electric guitar, Wurlitzer, shaker, tambourine, production, mixing
- Stewart Myers – bass
- Greg Kurstin – electric piano, electric organ, synthesizer
- Brian Jones – drums
- Chris Keup – preproduction, arrangement assistance
- Jeff Juliano – mixing, engineering
- Peter Harding – second engineer
- Ted Jensen – mastering

== Charts ==
=== Weekly charts ===
Chart (2003)	Peak position
Australia (ARIA)	63
Netherlands (Single Top 100)	89
New Zealand (Recorded Music NZ)	32
UK Singles (Official Charts)	79
US Billboard Hot 100	15
US Adult Alternative Airplay (Billboard)	1
US Adult Pop Airplay (Billboard)	4
US Pop Airplay (Billboard)	7

=== Year-end charts ===
Chart (2003)	Position
US Billboard Hot 100	52
US Adult Top 40 (Billboard)	5
US Mainstream Top 40 (Billboard)	29
US Triple-A (Billboard)	7

== Certifications ==
Region	Certification	Certified units/sales
United States (RIAA)	Platinum	1,000,000^{‡}
^{‡} Sales+streaming figures based on certification alone.

== Release history ==
Region	Date	Format(s)	Label(s)	Ref.
United States	January 27, 2003	Triple A radio	Elektra	
Australia	February 24, 2003	CD	Elektra	
United States	February 24, 2003	Hot adult contemporary radio	Elektra	
United States	April 7, 2003	Contemporary hit radio	Elektra	
United Kingdom	September 29, 2003	7-inch vinyl; CD	Elektra	
