= Jason Mraz =

American singer-songwriter (born 1977)

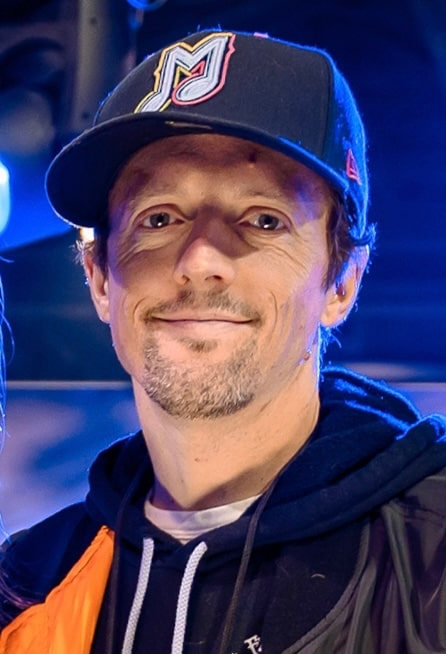
- Mraz in 2020
- Born: Jason Thomas Mraz; June 23, 1977 (age 49); Mechanicsville, Virginia, U.S.
- Occupations: Singer; guitarist; songwriter
- Years active: 1999–present
- Spouses: Sheridan Edley (m. 2001; div. 2002) Christina Carano (m. 2015; div. 2023)
- Musical career
- Genres: Pop; folk-pop; rock; blue-eyed soul
- Instruments: Vocals; guitar
- Labels: Elektra; Atlantic; Interrabang; BMG
- Website: www.jasonmraz.com

Jason Thomas Mraz (/məˈræz/ mə-RAZ; born June 23, 1977) is an American singer-songwriter and guitarist. He rose to prominence with the release of his debut studio album, Waiting for My Rocket to Come (2002), which spawned the single "The Remedy (I Won't Worry)" that peaked at number 15 on the Billboard Hot 100 chart. His second studio album Mr. A-Z (2005) peaked at number five on the Billboard 200.

His third studio album, We Sing. We Dance. We Steal Things. (2008), peaked at number 3 on the Billboard 200 and was certified four times Platinum by the Recording Industry Association of America (RIAA). The album's lead single, "I'm Yours", reached the top ten on the Billboard Hot 100, while spending a then-record 76 weeks on the Hot 100, and it was certified Diamond by the RIAA. The album also spawned the Grammy Award winning singles "Make It Mine" and "Lucky" with Colbie Caillat.

His fourth album, Love Is a Four Letter Word (2012), peaked at number two on the Billboard 200 and spawned the single "I Won't Give Up", which became his second top ten hit on the Hot 100. He went on to release the top ten albums Yes! (2014) and Know. (2018). After signing a three-album agreement with BMG in 2020, Mraz released the albums Look for the Good (2020) and Mystical Magical Rhythmical Radical Ride (2023).

Along with receiving two Grammy Award wins, Mraz is also the recipient of two Teen Choice Awards, a People's Choice Award, and the Hal David Songwriters Hall of Fame Award. As of July 2014, Mraz has sold over seven million albums, and over 11.5 million in digital singles.

In 2023, Mraz competed as a contestant on season 32 of Dancing with the Stars, finishing in second place, behind Xochitl Gomez.

== Early life ==
Mraz was born and raised in Mechanicsville, Virginia. His parents, Tom Mraz and June Tomes, divorced when he was five years old, leaving Mraz to live with his father while his sister lived with his mother. His father is a postal worker, and his mother is vice president at a branch of Bank of America. He is of partial Czech ancestry on his paternal side.

While attending Lee-Davis High School, Mraz was a member of the cheerleading squad, school chorus, and drama club. He starred as Joseph in Joseph and the Amazing Technicolor Dreamcoat and as Snoopy in Snoopy! The Musical. During this period of his life, he struggled with his sexuality at times, wondering if he was gay. Mraz graduated in 1995.

After high school, Mraz attended the American Musical and Dramatic Academy in New York City for about a year and a half, originally to work in musical theater. When his roommates played guitar he would provide the vocals. Eventually, a friend gave him a guitar that was about to be thrown away and Mraz learned to play and write his own music. Mraz credits an early girlfriend as being one of the influences that drove him to songwriting. She encouraged him to write his thoughts on paper which helped him get "all of the voices in my head to shut up" and "become something I could follow."

Mraz moved to the Shockoe Bottom neighborhood of Richmond, Virginia, where he took a series of odd jobs, including elementary-school janitor, and joined the Ashland Stage Company. Mraz then enrolled at Longwood University in Farmville, Virginia, on a scholarship. Instead of attending classes, he headed west on a road trip that ultimately brought him to San Diego, where he decided to stay.

== Music career ==
=== 1999–2001: Career beginnings ===
Soon after moving to San Diego in 1999, Mraz became a roadie for the band Elgin Park. He met future band member Toca Rivera at Java Joe's, a coffee house in the Ocean Beach neighborhood of San Diego known for being formative in the careers of Jewel and Steve Poltz. Mraz performed once a week for nearly three years, building a following in San Diego and online.

Mraz self-published the albums A Jason Mraz Demonstration (1999), From the Cutting Room Floor (2001), and On Love, In Sadness (The E Minor EP in F) (2001). In 2001, Mraz released the live acoustic album Live at Java Joe's, performing with percussionist Rivera and bassist Ian Sheridan. The album featured several songs he would later re-release, including "1000 Things", "You and I Both", and "Halfway Home". The album was later released on iTunes, on March 11, 2008, under the title Jason Mraz: Live & Acoustic 2001. Mraz returned to perform at Java Joe's for the 15th anniversary of the album on January 29, 2016. Mraz' last self-released album was Sold Out (In Stereo), released on March 21, 2002.

=== 2002–2004: Waiting for My Rocket to Come ===
In late 2001, Mraz signed a recording contract with Elektra Records and moved to Los Angeles.

In 2002, Mraz opened for Jewel on her tour.

On October 15, 2002, Mraz released his first major label debut album, Waiting for My Rocket to Come, which peaked at number 55 on the Billboard 200. The day after the album's release, Mraz played on The Late Late Show With Craig Kilborn. "You & I Both" was released as a promotional single prior to the album's release, but received minimal airplay.

In early 2003, Mraz released his first commercial single, "The Remedy (I Won't Worry)". The track was co-written by music production team The Matrix, and became Mraz's first top-40 single on the Billboard Hot 100, peaking at number 15. The song was inspired by a high school friend who was diagnosed with cancer. At the time of the album's release, Mraz said that he did not like "The Remedy (I Won't Worry)" and had not wanted it on the album. In June 2003, "You & I Both" was released commercially as the second single from the album. Waiting for My Rocket to Come was certified Platinum in May 2005 for selling 1 million units.

Mraz opened for Tracy Chapman in 2003 at the Royal Albert Hall in London. In 2004, while on tour, Mraz released a live album with an accompanying DVD, Tonight, Not Again: Jason Mraz Live at the Eagles Ballroom. He performed with his touring band, including drummer Adam King, Rivera, Sheridan and keyboardist Eric Hinojosa, along with a guest appearance from Blues Traveler frontman John Popper.

=== 2005–2007: Mr. A–Z ===
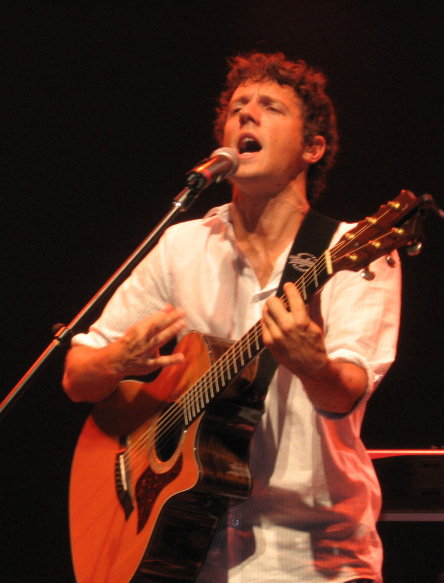
Jason Mraz performing at Foxwoods Resort Casino in Ledyard, Connecticut on May 17, 2006.

On July 26, 2005, Mraz released his second major label album, Mr. A–Z, produced by Steve Lillywhite for Atlantic Records. The album's lead single, "Wordplay", was produced by Kevin Kadish, and entered the Billboard 200 at number 5. The album earned a Grammy Award nomination for Best Engineered Album, Non-Classical, while Lillywhite received a nomination for Producer of the Year.

Mraz began a long-running tour in support of Mr. A–Z at the San Diego Music Awards on September 12, 2005. The tour featured several opening acts, including Bushwalla and Tristan Prettyman, with whom he had written the duet "Shy That Way" in 2002. Mraz opened for Alanis Morissette during her 2005 Jagged Little Pill Acoustic tour, and for the Rolling Stones on five dates during their 2005–06 world tour. In March 2006, he performed in Singapore as part of the annual Mosaic Music Festival. That May, he toured mostly small venues and music festivals in the U.S., along with a few shows in the United Kingdom and Ireland where he supported James Blunt. The tour included a May 6, 2006, acoustic show with P.O.D., Better Than Ezra, Live, and The presidents of the United States of America. Mraz was featured as a headlining guest of St. Louis's annual Fair St. Louis and performed a free concert at the base of the Gateway Arch on July 1, 2006. During this time, Mraz was also the opening act at several dates for Rob Thomas' Something to Be Tour.

In 2005, Mraz was one of many singers featured in the fall advertisement campaign for The Gap campaign "Favorites", singing a cover of Bob Marley's "One Love". 2006 saw the release of Selections for Friends, the live, online-only album recorded during the Songs for Friends Tour. In 2007, "The Beauty in Ugly", an earlier track penned by Mraz originally titled "Plain Jane", was rewritten for the ABC television show Ugly Betty. The song was featured as a part of ABC's "Be Ugly in '07" campaign.

=== 2008–2011: We Sing. We Dance. We Steal Things. ===
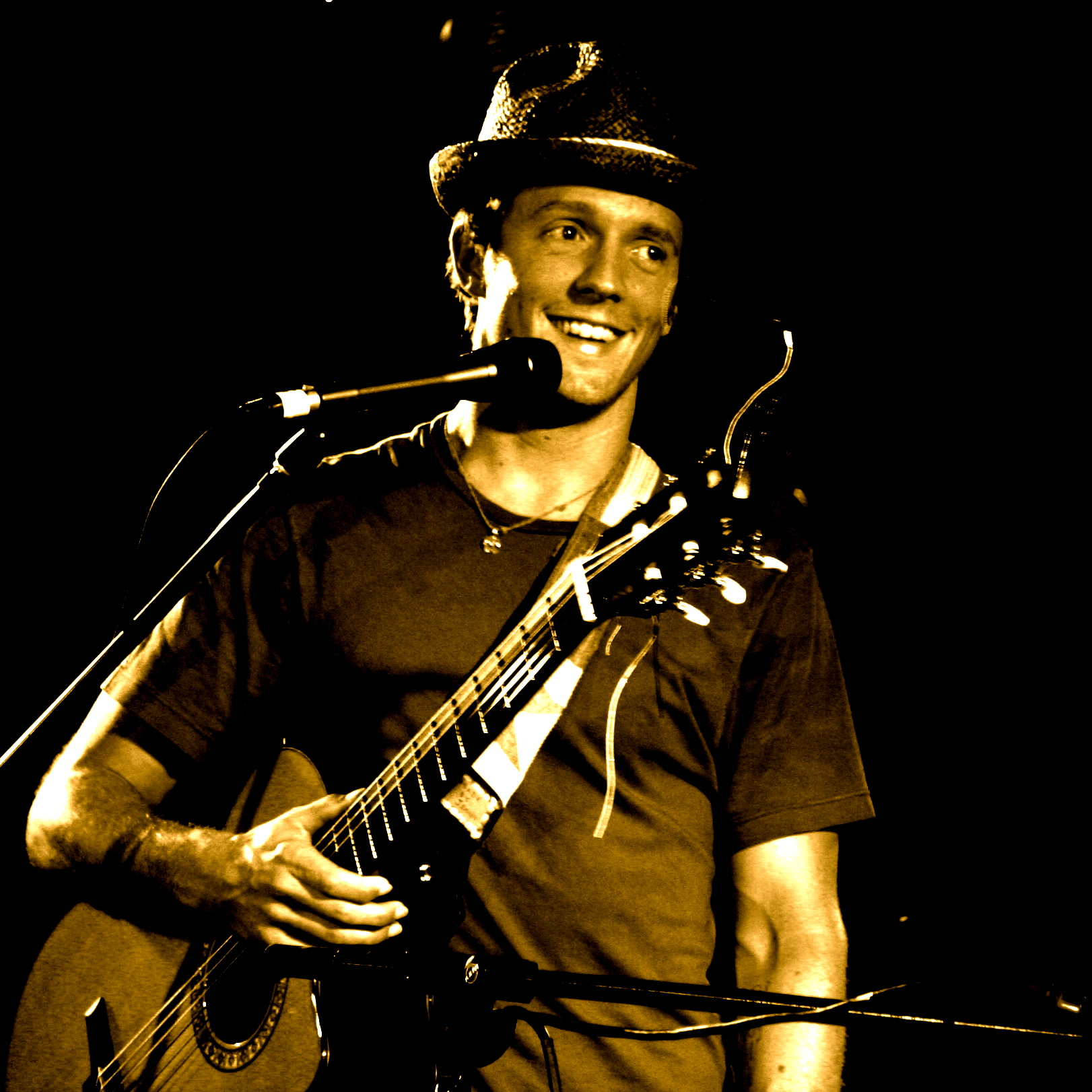
Mraz performing in Melbourne on tour in 2008

On May 13, 2008, Mraz released his third studio album, We Sing. We Dance. We Steal Things. The album debuted at number 3 on the Billboard 200 and was later certified quadruple platinum. It broke into the top 10 of many international music charts. Mraz said that the album title was taken from the work of Scottish artist David Shrigley. Prior to its release, Mraz released three EPs, each with acoustic versions of songs from the album.

The album's lead single, "I'm Yours", was written in August 2004 and was initially released in demo form on the limited edition EP Extra Credit in 2005. Through Mraz's live performances of the song, it gained in popularity with fans. "I'm Yours" became Mraz's first Top 10 hit on the Billboard Hot 100, peaking at No. 6 on September 20, 2008. It ultimately spent 76 weeks on the Hot 100, longer than any other song in the magazine's 51-year history (a record since broken by Imagine Dragons with "Radioactive" in 2014). It was a major commercial success in the US and was certified 7x multi-Platinum by the RIAA for sales of over seven million. The song was also successful internationally, topping the charts in New Zealand, Norway, Portugal and Sweden, and peaking in the top ten on the charts in 11 other countries. By May 2012, it had gained over 125,000,000 hits on YouTube. It was the first song to top the charts in four different radio formats: Mainstream Top 40, Adult Contemporary, Adult Top 40 and Triple A. "Make It Mine" was released as the second single from the album but failed to chart on the Billboard Hot 100. "Lucky" with Colbie Caillat was released as the third single from the album and peaked at number 48 on the Billboard Hot 100.

At the 2009 Grammy Awards, "I'm Yours" was nominated for Song of the Year and Best Male Pop Vocal Performance, and We Sing. We Dance. We Steal Things. was nominated for Best Engineered Album, Non-Classical. In 2009, Mraz was awarded the Hal David Starlight Award from the Songwriters Hall of Fame. In 2010, Mraz won two Grammy Awards for Best Male Pop Vocal Performance ("Make It Mine") and Best Pop Collaboration ("Lucky" with Colbie Caillat). "I'm Yours" was also named ASCAP's 2010 Song of the Year.

Mraz's 2008 world tour traveled across the United States, Europe, Asia, and Australia. His personal photo travelogue from the world tour was published as a book, titled A Thousand Things (2008). The book was launched with a photo exhibition at Charles Cowles Gallery in New York City at the end of 2008. Also in 2008, Mraz played with Eric Clapton to a crowd of 45,000 in Hyde Park, London, sold out London's Royal Albert Hall, and performed at the Nobel Peace Prize Concert in Oslo. That year, he embarked on the Music, Magic & Make Peace Tour with Bushwalla, The Makepeace Brothers, and magician Justin Willman.

In 2009, Mraz recorded "The Way Is Love", an unreleased Roy Orbison song, as a duet with Willie Nelson. In November 2009, he released the live CD/DVD Jason Mraz's Beautiful Mess: Live on Earth, recorded in Chicago during the Gratitude Café tour. The following year, he went to Brazil to record "Simplesmente Todo" with Milton Nascimento, who sings in Portuguese while Mraz sings in English. He also did some writing with Dido and recorded new material with producer Martin Terefe. Mraz released the live EP, Life Is Good on October 5, 2010.

=== 2012–2013: Love Is A Four Letter Word ===
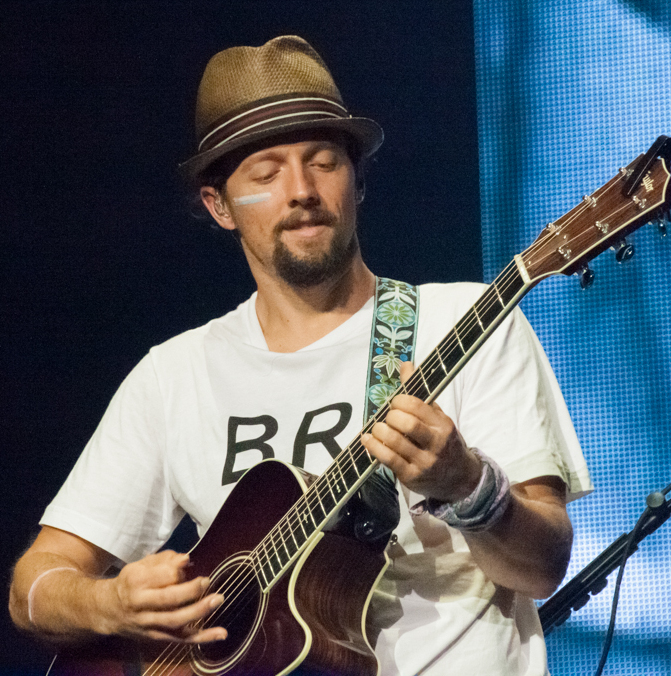
Mraz performing in 2013

Mraz released the live EP, Love Is A Four Letter Word, on February 28, 2012. His fourth studio album, Love Is a Four Letter Word was released on April 13, 2012. It reached number 2 on the Billboard 200, and the top 20 in 10 other countries. The album's lead single, "I Won't Give Up", debuted at number 8 on the Billboard Hot 100, and number 1 on the Digital Songs chart. It charted in 15 countries in total, and in October 2013 was certified 4x multi-platinum, for selling in excess of 4 million units. Further singles from the album were "93 Million Miles" and "The Woman I Love", but these releases were not as successful.

Love Is a Four Letter Word was nominated for a 2012 Grammy Award for Best Engineered Album, Non-Classical. In 2012, he played sold-out shows at the Hollywood Bowl in Los Angeles, Madison Square Garden in New York and the O2 Arena in London, and performed at President Barack Obama and family's lighting of the national Christmas tree at the White House; a noted Obama supporter, he has also performed at numerous other events involving Obama and Vice President Joe Biden. Also in 2012, he performed "You Did It" at the presentation ceremony for the Kennedy Center's Mark Twain Prize for American Humor, won that year by Ellen DeGeneres.

In September 2013, Mraz was featured on the Hunter Hayes song "Everybody's Got Somebody but Me", which was later certified Gold. The same month, he was featured on the Travie McCoy single "Rough Water". That year, Mraz won a People's Choice Award for Favorite Male Artist.

=== 2014–2019: Yes! and Know. ===
Mraz's fifth studio album, Yes!, was released on July 15, 2014. It was recorded with all-female folk rock band Raining Jane, with whom Mraz had previously collaborated on the track "A Beautiful Mess" for his 2008 album We Sing. We Dance. We Steal Things. The album's lead single, "Love Someone", was released on May 19, 2014; Mraz performed the song for Time. On June 20, 2014, he released We Can Take the Long Way, a music video trilogy for the first three songs on Yes!, which premiered on the USA Today website.

In 2015, Mraz was featured on "Bad Idea" and "You Matter to Me" on the Sara Bareilles album What's Inside: Songs From Waitress. On September 27, 2017, it was announced that Mraz would make his Broadway debut in the musical Waitress. He took on the role of Dr. Pomatter from November 3, 2017, until February 11, 2018.

On August 10, 2018, Mraz released his sixth studio album, Know.. He referred to the new album as "bright and shiny" and a "classic-sounding pop acoustic, vocally driven record with positive lyrics and love songs." The album was preceded by the release of two singles: "Have It All" was released on April 27, 2018, and was inspired by a blessing he received from a Buddhist monk during a trip to Myanmar in 2012. It was accompanied by a video filmed with performing arts students from his hometown of Richmond. The album's second single, "Unlonely", was released in June. In July 2018, Mraz shared the lyric video for the song "More Than Friends", a duet with Meghan Trainor. On August 7, 2018, he partnered with Fathom Events for the one-night-only release of Jason Mraz - Have It All The Movie, a concert film and behind the scenes footage of the making of the "Have It All" video, in 600 movie theaters throughout North America. In 2019, he was featured on the album The Secret by Alan Parsons as lead vocalist on the song "Miracle". On August 13, 2019, Mraz was named the first-ever District Advocate Ambassador to continue the fight for music creators' rights.

=== 2020–present: Look for the Good and Mystical Magical Rhythmical Radical Ride ===
In June 2020, Jason Mraz signed a three-album agreement with BMG led by Vice President of A&R Jaime Neely, Executive Vice President of Repertoire & Marketing Thomas Scherer, Vice President of Marketing and Recorded Music Cyndi Lynott, and Vice President of Creative Synch Jonathan Palmer. Jason also founded Interrabang Records, through which his 2020 album, Look for the Good, was released, as well as singer-songwriter Gregory Page's eighteenth album, One Hell of a Memory.

On February 15, 2023, Mraz released the single "I Feel Like Dancing" for his upcoming album Mystical Magical Rhythmical Radical Ride. The album was released on June 23, 2023, which was also Mraz's 46th birthday. In September 2023, Mraz began appearing on Season 32 of Dancing With the Stars, partnered with pro dancer Daniella Karagach. He placed second during the season finale.

Dancing with the Stars performances

Average: 26.6/30

Week #	Dance / Song	Judges' scores					Result
Week #	Dance / Song	Inaba	Hough	Guest	Tonioli	Total	Result
1	Cha-cha-cha / "I Feel Like Dancing"	7	7	N/A	7	21	Safe
2	Rumba / "Quizás, Quizás, Quizás"	8	8	N/A	8	24	Safe
3	Jive / "Do You Love Me"	9	8	9	8	34	Safe
4	Foxtrot / "A Whole New World"	8	8	N/A	8	24	Safe
5	Quickstep / "On the Road Again"	9	9	N/A	9	27	Safe
6	Contemporary / "Zombie"	9	9	9	9	36	Safe
7	Jazz / "Take On Me"; Team Freestyle / "Everybody (Backstreet's Back)"	8; 9	8; 9	10; 10	9; 9	35; 37	Safe
8	Samba / "Higher Love"	8	9	8	8	33	Safe
9	Argentine tango / "Don't Blame Me"	10	10	10	10	40	Safe
10	Viennese waltz / "I Won't Give Up"; Paso doble / "Diablo Rojo"	9; 10	9; 10	N/A	9; 10	27; 30	No elimination
11	Foxtrot / "Fly Me to the Moon"; Freestyle / "Happy"	10; 10	10; 10	N/A	10; 10	30; 30	Runner-up

== Musical style ==
Mraz's music has been labeled as pop, folk-pop, rock, and blue-eyed soul. He also incorporates elements of folk, hip-hop, jam band, and soft rock into his music.

== Personal life ==
Mraz lives a health-conscious lifestyle and has said that he eats mostly raw vegan foods. His vegan diet has also influenced his music. He owns a five-and-a-half acre avocado farm in Oceanside, California. He is an investor at Café Gratitude, a vegan restaurant in Los Angeles, and named his 2011 tour Gratitude Café in its honor. His hobbies include surfing, yoga and photography.

=== Relationships and sexuality ===
Mraz married Sheridan Edley in 2001. They divorced the following year.

Mraz was engaged to singer-songwriter and long-time close friend Tristan Prettyman on Christmas Eve 2010; they broke off the engagement six months later.

On October 25, 2015, Mraz married Christina Carano in a private ceremony in his hometown of Mechanicsville, Virginia. On June 22, 2023, Mraz announced that he and Carano had divorced.

In June 2018, Mraz penned a "love letter" to the LGBT community, as part of a Billboard feature during gay pride month. A line in the poem, "I am bi your side. / All ways" led some media reports to state that the poem represented Mraz's coming out as bisexual. In an article published on July 19, 2018, by Billboard, Mraz said he has had previous experiences with men, even while dating Carano. Mraz said Carano defined him as a "two-spirit", a description that was criticized by some as misappropriating a word originally coined for the Native American population, arguing that it distorted the term's meaning. In August 2018, Mraz confirmed in an interview with the New York Post that he is bisexual.

=== Social activism and philanthropy ===
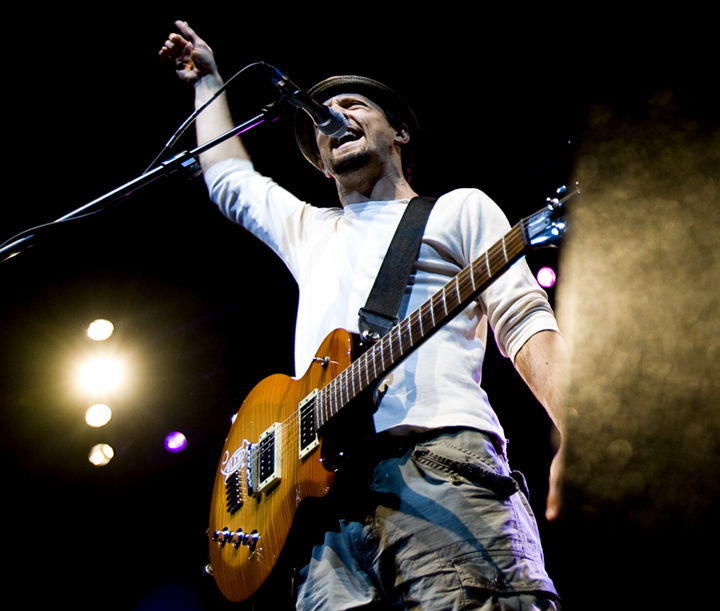
Jason Mraz in March 2009

Mraz is a social activist whose philanthropic efforts span wide-ranging issues, including environmentalism, human rights, and LGBT equality.

In 2003, after learning one of his beer bottles was listed for sale on eBay, Mraz was inspired to auction off items of his wardrobe online, raising money for the Make a Wish Foundation.

During early tours, he encouraged his fans to drop off food items as they arrived at the venue, an effort to support local food banks.

In 2009, he participated in a rescue mission to Ghana with members of Free the Slaves, a global nonprofit working to liberate children sold into slavery. In 2012, he was featured on the cover of Instinct magazine in recognition of his efforts in support of LGBT rights.

The Jason Mraz Foundation was established in 2011, with a mission to support charities in the areas of human equality, environment preservation and education. Organizations supported by the foundation include VH1's Save The Music Foundation, MusiCares, Surfrider Foundation, Free the Children, Life Rolls On, the School of the Performing Arts in the Richmond Community, the Natural Resources Defense Council, and the True Colors Fund, which promotes LGBT equality.

Mraz was named the 2010 Surf Industry Manufacturers Association (SIMA) Humanitarian of the Year. He also received the Clean Water Award in 2010 from the Surfrider Foundation, for helping to preserve the world's oceans and beaches. That same year, he teamed up with The Nature Conservancy and created a PSA using his song "I'm Yours" to raise awareness about the nonprofit organization's efforts to protect the earth.

On December 16, 2012, Mraz headlined the Milestone Concert in Myanmar to raise awareness about human trafficking, making him the first foreign artist to play an open-air concert in Myanmar. The concert was organized by MTV EXIT and held in the People's Square in Yangon, with over 70,000 people in attendance, as part of an initiative to raise awareness about human trafficking in Myanmar. Also in 2012, Mraz spent a week in Antarctica with a group of environmentalists, scientists and researchers on a mission led by Al Gore, to learn about the effects of climate change.

Mraz is a continued supporter of WhyHunger, a grassroots support organization dedicated to fighting hunger and poverty in the United States. The organization was founded by late musician Harry Chapin and Radio DJ Bill Ayres in 1975.

On June 19, 2020, Mraz announced he would be donating all profits from his album Look for the Good to Black Lives Matter and other organizations working toward equality and social justice.

=== Politics ===
On October 24, 2019, Mraz endorsed Bernie Sanders for president in the 2020 Democratic Party presidential primaries stating, "Bernie is the perfect candidate to follow Trump & continue to shake up the system for the benefit of true American values: Life, Liberty & The Pursuit of Happiness".

== Discography ==
Studio albums

- Waiting for My Rocket to Come (2002)
- Mr. A–Z (2005)
- We Sing. We Dance. We Steal Things. (2008)
- Love Is a Four Letter Word (2012)
- Yes! (2014)
- Know. (2018)
- Look for the Good (2020)
- Mystical Magical Rhythmical Radical Ride (2023)

== Awards and nominations ==
Award	Year	Nominee(s)	Category	Result	Ref.
Grammy Awards	2009	"I'm Yours"	Song of the Year	Nominated	
Grammy Awards	2009	"I'm Yours"	Best Male Pop Vocal Performance	Nominated	
Grammy Awards	2010	"Make It Mine"	Best Male Pop Vocal Performance	Won	
Grammy Awards	2010	"Lucky" (with Colbie Caillat)	Best Pop Collaboration with Vocals	Won	
Pop Awards	2021	Himself	Icon of the Year	Nominated	
Pop Awards	2021	Look for the Good	Album of the Year	Nominated	
RTHK International Pop Poll Awards	2008	Himself	Top Male Artist	Gold	
RTHK International Pop Poll Awards	2008	"Make It Mine"	Top Ten International Gold Songs	Nominated	
RTHK International Pop Poll Awards	2010	"Lucky" (with Colbie Caillat)	Top Ten International Gold Songs	Nominated	
RTHK International Pop Poll Awards	2010	Himself	Top Male Artist	Nominated	
RTHK International Pop Poll Awards	2015	Himself	Top Male Artist	Nominated	
RTHK International Pop Poll Awards	2015	"Love Someone"	Top Ten International Gold Songs	Won	
RTHK International Pop Poll Awards	2019	"Have It All"	Top Ten International Gold Songs	Won	
RTHK International Pop Poll Awards	2019	Himself	Top Male Artist	Silver	
RTHK International Pop Poll Awards	2021	Himself	Top Male Artist	Nominated	
RTHK International Pop Poll Awards	2021	"Look for the Good"	Top Ten International Gold Songs	Nominated	
RTHK International Pop Poll Awards	2022	"Always Looking for You"	Top Ten International Gold Songs	Nominated	
RTHK International Pop Poll Awards	2022	Himself	Top Male Artist	Nominated	
San Diego Music Awards	2002	Himself	Best Acoustic	Won	
San Diego Music Awards	2002	Himself	Artist of the Year	Won	
San Diego Music Awards	2003	Himself	Artist of the Year	Won	
San Diego Music Awards	2003	"The Remedy (I Won't Worry)"	Song of the Year	Won	
San Diego Music Awards	2004	Himself	Artist of the Year	Won	
San Diego Music Awards	2009	Himself	Artist of the Year	Nominated	
San Diego Music Awards	2009	"Lucky" (with Colbie Caillat)	Song of the Year	Nominated	
San Diego Music Awards	2009	We Sing. We Dance. We Steal Things.	Album of the Year	Won	
San Diego Music Awards	2014	Himself	Artist of the Year	Won	
San Diego Music Awards	2014	"Love Someone"	Best Music Video	Won	
San Diego Music Awards	2014	"Love Someone"	Song of the Year	Nominated	
San Diego Music Awards	2014	Yes!	Album of the Year	Nominated	
San Diego Music Awards	2019	Himself	Artist of the Year	Nominated	
San Diego Music Awards	2019	"Have It All"	Song of the Year	Nominated	
San Diego Music Awards	2019	Know.	Album of the Year	Nominated	

=== Other awards ===
Year	Nominee / work	Award	Result
2004	Jason Mraz	Pollstar Concert Industry Awards for Best New Touring Artist	Nominated
2009	Jason Mraz	Teen Choice Award for Choice Music – Male Artist	Won
2009	We Sing. We Dance. We Steal Things.	Teen Choice Award for Choice Album (Male Artist)	Won
2009	Jason Mraz	American Music Award for Favorite Adult Contemporary Artist	Nominated
2009	Jason Mraz	Songwriters Hall of Fame Hal David Starlight Award	Won
2010	Jason Mraz	People's Choice Award for Favorite Male Artist	Nominated
2010	"I'm Yours"	ASCAP Song of the Year	Won
2010	Jason Mraz	Surf Industry Manufacturers Association Humanitarian of the Year	Won
2010	Jason Mraz	Surfrider Foundation Clean Water Award	Won
2012	"I Won't Give Up"	Best Love Song	Nominated
2012	"I Won't Give Up"	MVPA Awards for Best Adult Contemporary Video	Nominated
2012	Jason Mraz	ASCAP Foundation Champion Award	Won
2013	Jason Mraz	People's Choice Award for Pop Male Artist	Won
2013	Jason Mraz	MTV Europe Music Award For Best World Stage	Nominated

== Bibliography ==
- A Thousand Things (2008, I Love Books)

== Filmography ==
=== Film ===
Year	Title	Role	Notes
2012	The Big Fix	Himself	Produced / Documentary film
2015	Unity	Narrator	Documentary
2019	Trouble	Himself (voice)	Animated film
2020	Clouds	Himself	Feature film
2020	Kiss the Ground	Himself	Documentary

=== Television appearances (selected) ===
- American Music Awards (2003)
- Late Night with Conan O'Brien (2003)
- The Tonight Show with Jay Leno (2003, 2005, 2008)
- New Year's Rockin' Eve (2004)
- The Ellen DeGeneres Show (2004, 2006, 2008, 2009, 2014)
- Jimmy Kimmel Live! (2004, 2005, 2009, 2012)
- The EBS space (EBS 스페이스 공감) (2006)
- Late Show with David Letterman (2008, 2009, 2012)
- Nobel Peace Prize Concert (2008)
- Rachael Ray (2008)
- American Idol (2009, 2019)
- Saturday Night Live (2009, 2019)
- Spicks and Specks (2009)
- The Tonight Show with Conan O'Brien (2009)
- Grammy Awards (2009, 2010)
- Family Guy (2010)
- The Jay Leno Show (2010)
- Sesame Street (2010)
- Chelsea Lately (2012)
- Conan (2012)
- Dancing With the Stars (2012)
- The Fresh Beat Band (2012)
- Late Night with Jimmy Fallon (2012)
- Opening Act (2012)
- Today (2012)
- VH1 Storytellers (2012)
- Watch What Happens: Live (2012)
- Live from Daryl's House (2012)
- Live from the Artists Den (2014)
- American Restoration (2015)
- K-pop Star 4 (케이팝 스타 4) (2015)
- Pete the Cat (2018)
- Today Show with Hoda and Jena (2019)
- Celebrity Show-Off (2020)
- Celebrity Wheel of Fortune (2021)
- Rick and Morty (2022) – Brachiosaurus (voice; in "Juricksic Mort")
- Dancing with the Stars (2023)
