= Carlos Sosa (musician) =

American musician

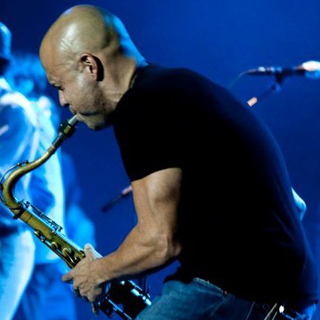
- Carlos Sosa performing October 2010.

Background information
- Born: San Antonio, Texas, U.S.
- Genres: funk; R&B; soul; pop; hip hop; latin
- Occupations: musician; producer; arranger; composer; music director; recording engineer; Audio mixing
- Instruments: tenor saxophone; baritone saxophone; flute
- Years active: 1996–present

Carlos Sosa is an American musician, producer, composer, music director, and arranger. Heavily influenced by the R&B and funk sounds of the 1970s, Sosa founded Grooveline Horns in 1996, and is best known for touring and recording with Maroon 5, Kelly Clarkson, Jason Mraz, Zac Brown Band, Hanson, Natalia Lafourcade, Wynonna Judd, Mike Posner, Skrillex, Missy Elliott, Kenny Wayne Shepherd, Dumpstaphunk, Warren Haynes, Ozomatli, Intergalactix, and Mexican artists Jesse & Joy.

He has also performed with Marcus King, Rob Thomas, Dave Matthews, Big Freedia, Cimafunk, and Gary Clark Jr., among others.

In 2024, Sosa and the Grooveline Horns joined the house band for Kill Tony.

== Early influences and career ==
Sosa started playing saxophone around the age of 10. When he was 15, he joined a funk band and started playing clubs in Texas. Heavily influenced by Earth, Wind & Fire, James Brown and Parliament-Funkadelic, he knew his musical preferences leaned heavily towards funk, R&B, soul and pop music.

He attended Texas State University, getting a degree in audio engineering. While in college, he formed Grooveline Horns and they played with various cover bands on 6th Street, honing their versatility. Within a short time, they began playing with Austin musician Bob Schneider. This led to bigger acts using the group including Don Henley, Suicidal Tendencies, and Kelly Clarkson.

== Children's Music ==
Sosa has written, performed, and produced two children’s records with Coy Bowles (guitarist for Zac Brown Band): 2020's "Music for Tiny Humans" and 2023's "Up and Up.".

The video for “The Clean Up Song” garnered 1.4 million views in its first five months on YouTube.

== Awards ==
Year	Nominee / work	Award	Result
2009	We Sing. We Dance. We Steal Things., Jason Mraz	2009 Teen Choice Awards	Won
2005	Best Groupera Album, La Mafia	Latin Grammy Awards	Won
2004	Spanish Album of the Year, Con Poder, Salvador	35th GMA Dove Awards	Won
1997	Best Horns: Grooveline Horns, The Scabs	Austin Music Awards	Won
1998	Best Horns: Grooveline Horns	Austin Music Awards	Won
1999	Best Horns: Grooveline Horns	Austin Music Awards	Won
2000	Best Horns: Grooveline Horns, The Scabs	Austin Music Awards	Won
2001	Best Horns: Grooveline Horns	Austin Music Awards	Won
2003	Best Horns: Grooveline Horns	Austin Music Awards	Won
2006	Best Horns: Grooveline Horns	Austin Music Awards	Won

== Discography ==
Year	Album	Artist	Credits
2023	Ratata	Skrillex, Missy Elliott	Saxophone
2023	From The Road, Vol 1: Covers	Zac Brown Band	Saxophone, Horn Arranger
2023	Mystical Magical Rhythmical Radical Ride	Jason Mraz	Saxophone, Flute, Horn Arranger, Engineer
2023	Up and Up	Coy Bowles & Carlos Sosa	Producer, Songwriter, Engineer, Vocals
2023	I Feel Like Dancing	Jason Mraz	Saxophone, Flute, Horn Arranger, Engineer
2022	Best Of Me	Joanna Connor	Flute, Saxophone
2022	Red Green Blue	Hanson	Saxophone, Horn Arranger, Engineer
2021	Lucky[2021]	Jason Mraz	Saxophone
2020	Jamz	Outasight	Musician
2020	Music For Tiny Humans	Coy Bowles	Producer, Songwriter, Engineer, Vocals
2020	You Do You	Jason Mraz	Saxophone, Horn Arranger
2020	Music Played By Humans	Gary Barlow	Producer, Saxophone, Horn Arrangements
2020	Look for the Good	Jason Mraz	Saxophone, Horn Arrangements
2019	Samsara	Los Coast	Saxophone
2019	Heavy Is The Head	Stormzy	Saxophone, Trumpet
2018	Know	Jason Mraz	Horn Arrangements, Saxophone
2018	Future Vintage Soul	Outasight	Composer
2017	Finally It's Christmas	Hanson	Engineer, Horn Arrangements, Saxophone
2017	Sir Rosevelt	Sir Rosevelt	Saxophone, arranger
2017	Jesse & Joy	Jesse & Joy	Saxophone
2017	Lay It on Down	Kenny Wayne Shepherd Band / Kenny Wayne Shepherd	Saxophone
2017	Until My Voice Goes Out	Josh Abbott Band	Producer, engineer, Saxophone, Horn Arrangements
2016	Spark	Drake White	Saxophone
2015	Big Trouble	Outasight	Composer
2015	Un Besito Mas	Jesse & Joy	Saxophone
2015	Vivir Sin Miedo	Buika	Saxophone
2014	8	Luis Fonsi	Arranger, engineer, Horn Arrangements, Horn Engineer, Mixing, Saxophone
2014	Dear You	Meiko	Saxophone, Horn Arrangements, Horn Engineer
2014	Defected Presents Glitterbox Ibiza	2014	Composer
2014	Engelbert Calling	Engelbert Humperdinck	Saxophone, Primary Artist, Horn, Horn Arrangements, Horn Engineer
2014	Junto	Basement Jaxx	Composer
2014	Viaje	Ricardo Arjona	Saxophone, producer
2013	All People (Deluxe)	Michael Franti	Saxophone, arranger, Horn Section
2013	Baby Let's Dance	Shane Filan	Saxophone
2013	Dirty Word	Dumpstaphunk	Guest Artist, Primary Artist
2013	In a World Like This	Backstreet Boys	Saxophone, Horn Engineer, Primary Artist
2013	PTX, Vol. II	Pentatonix	Composer
2013	Red Room	The Shadowboxers	Saxophone, Horn Arrangements, Primary Artist
2013	Everything to Me	Shane Filan	Saxophone
2013	Whut It Dew: The Album	Rapid Ric	Saxophone
2012	Love Is a Four Letter Word	Jason Mraz	Saxophone
2012	Live at the Moody Theater	Warren Haynes / Warren Haynes Band	Saxophone, Guest Artist
2012	¿Con Quién Se Queda el Perro?	Jesse & Joy	Arranger, Saxophone
2012	Watergate X	Watergate Records	Composer, producer
2011	Cocoon Heroes	Adam Beyer / Dorian Paic	Composer, producer
2011	When You Gonna Learn	Beverley Knight	Saxophone
2011	Everybody Want Sum	Dumpstaphunk	Saxophone
2011	Soul UK	Beverley Knight	Horns
2011	Everything Everytime Everywhere	Trevor Hall	Saxophone, Horn Engineer
2011	Man in Motion	Warren Haynes	Saxophone
2011	Fabric 56	Derrick Carter	Composer
2010	The Future Ain't What It Used to Be	Bleu Edmondson	Saxophone
2010	Top Ten	Salvador	Producer
2009	Back in the Box	DJ Sneak	Producer, Mixing, composer
2009	Del Castillo	Del Castillo	Saxophone
2009	Catwalk Megahits 2009	Various Artists	Composer
2009	Chilled, Vol. 2: 1991–2009	Various Artists	Composer
2009	How Far Is Heaven: The Best of Salvador	Salvador	Producer
2009	La Terrazza Atmospherical Fun Club	Valentino Kanzyani	Composer, producer
2008	10,000 Nights (2 Tracks)	Alphabeat	Composer
2008	Bacardi B-Live, Vol. 9	Various Artists	Composer
2008	The Glass Passenger	Jack's Mannequin	Saxophone, Horn Arrangement
2009	When I Let Go	Paul Wesley	Saxophone, Horn Arrangements
2008	Thicker Than Water	Vallejo	Saxophone, composer
2008	We Sing. We Dance. We Steal Things.	Jason Mraz	Arranger, engineer, Flute, Saxophone (Tenor), Saxophone (Baritone)
2008	The New World	Bruce Robison	Saxophone, composer
2007	Feel the Boombox	Boombox ATX	Producer, Saxophone, Founder, Group Member
2007	Future Clouds & Radar	Future Clouds & Radar	Saxophone
2007	Noble Creatures	The Gourds	Saxophone
2007	Listen Hear	Dumpstaphunk	Saxophone
2007	Get Down	Todd Terry / Todd Terry All Stars	Composer
2007	Penthouse: La Nuit Luxure	Todd Terry	Composer
2007	Strictly Todd Terry	Todd Terry	Composer
2007	The Birth of Cornelius	Corneille	Saxophone, Horn Arrangements
2007	The Grand DJ Mix 2007: Non Stop House Traxx	Various Artists	Composer
2007	Vocal House Sensation, Vol. 1	Various Artists	Composer
2007	Young Style Grooves, Vol. 3	Various Artists	Composer
2006	24/7 Intimate Praise	Joyce Pierce	Saxophone
2006	From There to Here and Now	Rolando	Producer, engineer, Mixing, composer
2006	Get It Goin'	Stereokitsch	Saxophone
2006	Hot House 2006	Various Artists	Composer
2006	Musique, Vol. 1	Daft Punk	Composer
2006	No. 1 Euphoric Dance Album (Box Set)	Various Artists	Composer
2006	Real House Classics	Various Artists	Producer, composer
2006	Sensation White 2006	Various Artists	Composer
2006	Sessions 4	DJ Sneak	Composer
2006	Summer Essentials	Various Artists	Composer
2005	¡Bastardos!	Blues Traveler	Editing, Saxophone, Horn Overdubs
2005	Byzantine	Jud Newcomb	Saxophone
2005	Chica	Chica	Saxophone
2005	Distancias	Jason McGuire	Engineer
2005	Family Duels	Inland Knights	Composer
2005	House of Om	DJ Sneak	Composer
2005	Parables & Primes	Danny Schmidt	Engineer, Assistant
2005	Playboy: The Mansion Soundtrack	Felix da Housecat	Producer, composer
2005	Qué Tan Lejos Está El Cielo	Salvador	Producer, arranger, Vocals, Saxophone, Recording, composer
2005	Renaissance Presents Frontiers	Yousef	Composer
2005	Switch, Vol. 3	Various Artists	Composer
2005	Technics in the Mix 50: 2005	Various Artists	Composer
2004	Album, Vol. 2	Various Artists	Composer
2004	Amor Sagrado, Vol. 1	Various Artists	Composer
2004	Chillout Sessions, Vol. 5	Various Artists	Composer
2004	Club Classics – The Greatest Old Skool	Various Artists	Producer, composer
2004	Housekeepin'	DJ Sneak	Composer
2004	Dancemania, Vol. 21: Non-Stop Mixed by X-Treme	X-Treme	Composer
2004	Para El Pueblo	La Mafia	Guest Artist, Saxophone
2004	Screen Cuts	Various Artists	Composer
2004	So Natural	Salvador	Composer
2004	The Trax Records: The Next Generation	Various Artists	Composer
2004	The Trax Records: Queer Trax	Various Artists	Composer
2004	Tribal Gathering Presents 10 Years of Sankey's Soap	Krysko / Greg Vickers	Producer, arranger, Mixing, composer
2003	Alfresco Soiree, Vol. 2	Various Artists	Composer
2003	Best of House, Vol. 3	Various Artist	Composer
2003	Chinese Vacation	Steve Poltz	Saxophone
2003	Con Poder	Salvador	Producer, arranger, Saxophone, Recording, composer
2003	Conciones de la Familia de la Vega	Leti Delavega	Tenor Saxophone
2003	Credence Club Hits	Various Artists	Composer
2003	Daft Club	Daft Punk	Composer
2003	Dance Nation 2003	Various Artists	Composer
2003	Homework/Discovery	Daft Punk	Composer
2003	Earthbeat, Vol. 2	Various Artists	Composer
2003	Good for Nuthin	Honeybrowne	Producer, engineer, Mixing, Percussion, Vocal Harmony, Group Member
2003	House Classics: The Greatest House Anthems of All Time	Various Artists	Producer, composer
2003	Living in a Big Pink Edsel	Hulley Gulleys	Saxophone
2003	Lucky	Jean Synodinos	Sax (Alto), Sax (Tenor), Group Member
2003	Now Dance 2003, Vol. 2	Various Artists	Composer
2003	Pensando en Ti	Various Artists	Producer
2003	Steamboat Live '97	Vallejo	Primary Artist
2003	Chinese Vacation	Steve Poltz	Horn Arrangements
2003	Pure Dance Party, Vol. 1	Various Artists	Composer
2003	Siempre en Forma, Vol. 1	Various Artists	Composer
2003	The Best Dance Album in the World...Ever! 2002	Various Artists	Composer
2003	The Challenge: A Call to Action	Promise Keepers	Horn Overdubs
2003	Underwater, Episode 2	Darren Emerson	Producer, arranger, Mixing, composer
2003	Worship Live	Salvador	Arranger
2002	2002 Brit Awards Hits	Various Artists	Composer
2002	Bate Que Bate	Mayonesa	Vocals
2002	Decks and the City, Vol. 1: New York	Marcus & Dominique	Producer, arranger, Mixing, composer
2002	Fencing Under Fire	Patrice Pike	Sax (Alto), Sax (Tenor)
2002	Got Dance?	Various Artists	Composer
2002	Into Motion	Salvador	Saxophone, Horn Arrangements, Overdub Engineer
2002	Kiss Presents: Hit List 2002	Various Artists	Composer
2002	Mastercuts: Discothèque	Various Artists	Producer
2002	Miss Moneypenny's Gold	Various Artists	Composer
2002	My Favorite Record	Asylum Street Spankers	Additional Personnel, Sax (Baritone)
2002	Nouvelle Discothèque	Various Artists	Composer
2002	Platinum Ibiza	Various Artists	Producer, arranger, Mixing, composer
2002	Trust the DJ: SJ01	Smokin Jo	Producer, Mixing, composer
2002	Wild, Vol. 15	Various Artists	Composer
2001	Absolute 2001	Various Artists	Composer
2001	Ataca	Tribu	Producer, engineer, Editing, Sax (Alto), Sax (Tenor)
2001	Creamfields 2001	Seb Fontaine / Yousef	Producer, composer
2001	Digital Love	Daft Punk	Composer
2001	Discovery	Daft Punk	Composer
2001	DjMixed.Com: DJ Feelgood	DJ Feelgood	Producer, arranger, Mixing, composer
2001	Global Underground: Singapore	Darren Emerson	Producer, arranger, Mixing, composer
2001	Lonelyland	Bob Schneider	Saxophone
2001	Mayonesa	Chocolate	Vocals
2001	Miami 2001	Various Artists	Composer
2001	Miss Moneypenny's: Going Global	Jim "Shaft" Ryan	Producer, arranger, Mixing, composer
2002	Now Dance 2002	Various Artists	Composer
2001	Now That's What I Call Music! 50 [UK]	Various Artists	Composer
2001	Pepsi Chart 2002	Various Artists	Composer
2001	Queen Club Paris: DJ Set, Vol. 1–2	Various Artists	Composer
2001	Sneak's Ju Ju Beats	DJ Sneak	Composer
2000	Bombtracks	The Scabs	Saxophone
2000	Destroyer	The Scabs	Saxophone
2000	Sub Club Presents Subversion	Various Artists	Producer, arranger, Mixing
1999	Classic Classic	Various Artists	Producer, composer
1999	Club Series, Vol. 2	DJ Irene	Composer
1999	Denver Live	DJ Vitamin D	Producer, arranger, Mixing, composer
1999	Groove Radio International Presents: Global House	Swedish Egil	Composer
1999	Hits	Jocelyn Brown	Composer
1999	Little Brother	Beaver Nelson	Saxophone
1999	Ministry of Sound, Vol. 9	Various Artists	Composer
1999	More Than a Feeling	The Scabs	Horn Arrangements
1998	Absolute Dance Mix, Vol. 2	Various Artists	Composer
1998	Boom Boom Baby	The Ugly Americans	Horn Arrangements
1998	Boomtown Flood	Cadillac Voodoo Choir	Sax (Tenor), Sax (Baritone)
1998	Freebird	The Scabs	Horn Arrangements
1997	Vallejo	Vallejo	Assistant Engineer

=== Singles ===
Year	Single	Artist	Credits
2015	The Wild Life	Outasight	Composer

== Music community and advocacy ==
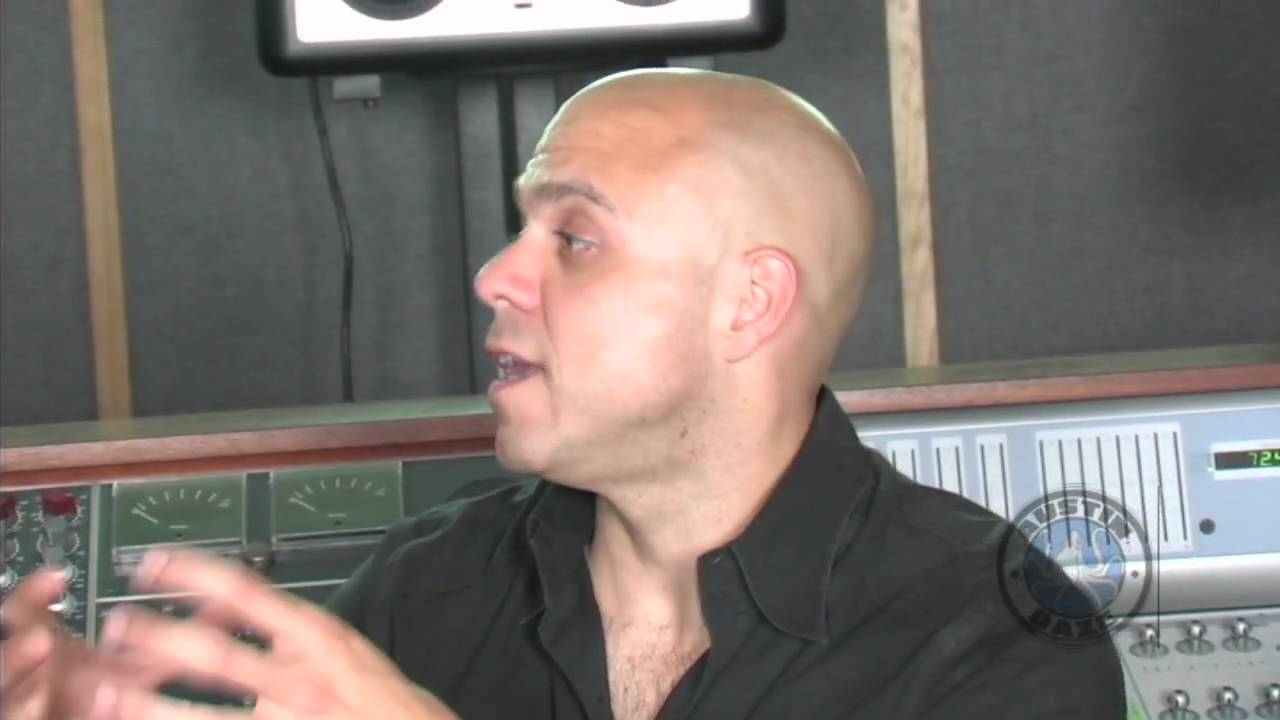
Carlos Sosa discussing musician rights.

Sosa has been an active member of the Texas Chapter Board of Governors for the Recording Academy (also known as the GRAMMYs), having held office as both President and Vice President.

He is a former board member and chair of the SIMS Foundation, where he advocated with local politicians regarding the epidemic of opioid abuse.

Sosa is also a founding Advisory Board Member of Sonic Guild (formerly Black Fret), a non-profit organization that provides grants and mentorship to musicians.

He has advocated for passing laws for royalty payments for musicians in the US, providing parity with the rest of the world.

After the 2017 Las Vegas shooting while playing with Josh Abbott Band, he urged fans to continue going to shows.
