= Grooveline Horns =

US musical group

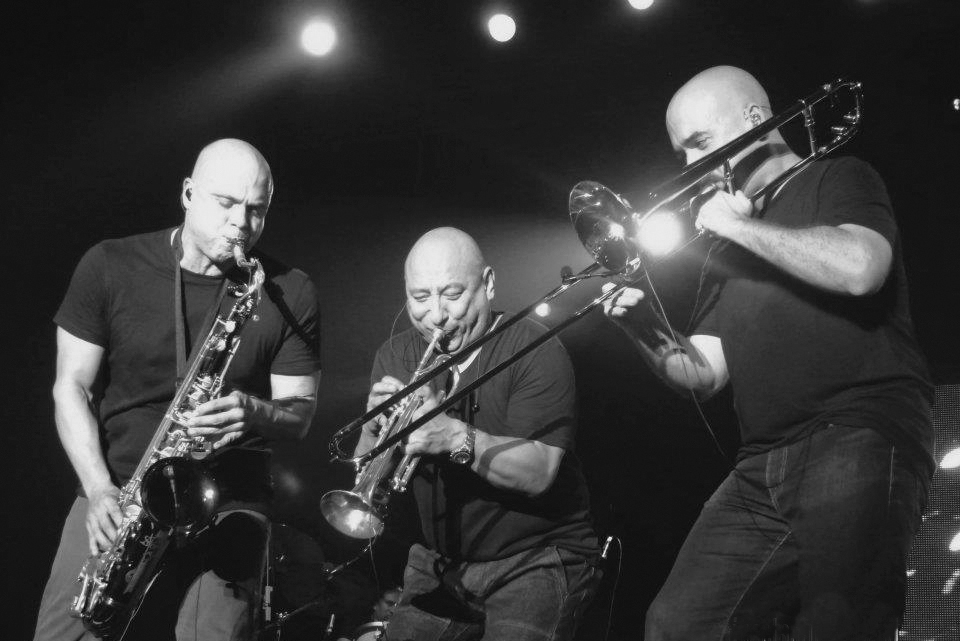
- Grooveline Horns playing with Jason Mraz

Background information
- Origin: Austin, Texas, US
- Genres: funk; R&B; soul; pop; hip-hop; latin
- Years active: 1996–present
- Members: Carlos Sosa; Fernando “Fernie” Castillo; Raul Vallejo
- Past members: Reggie Watkins

Grooveline Horns is an American funk and R&B-based horn section, originating in Austin, Texas. They are best known for touring and recording with Maroon 5, Kelly Clarkson, Jason Mraz, and Zac Brown Band. They are also performing on the Kill Tony podcast along with the Kill Tony Band.

== Band members ==
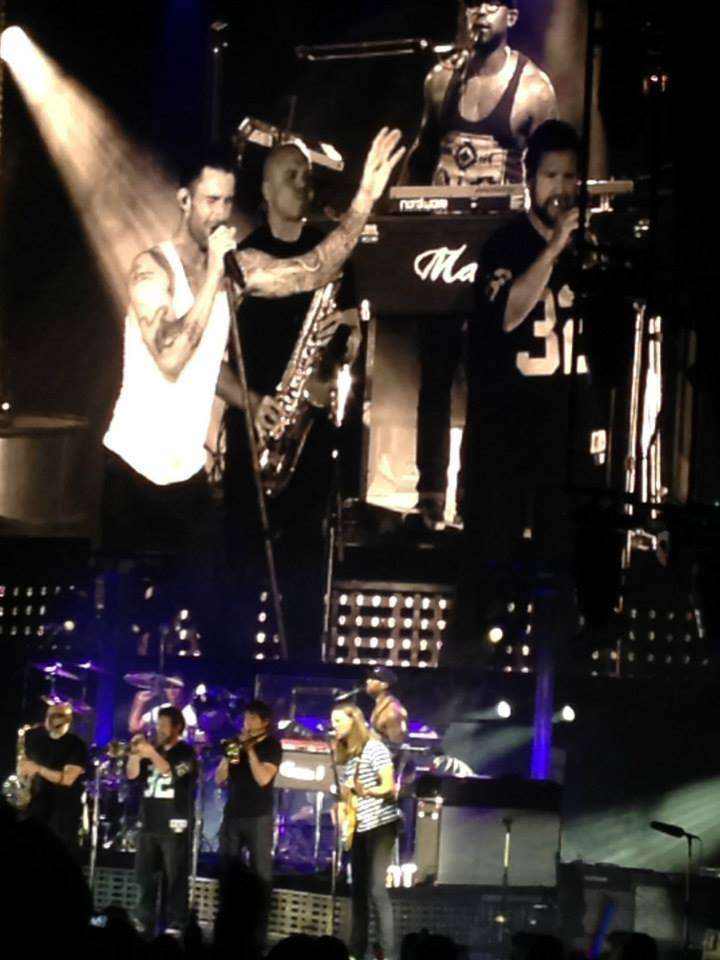
Grooveline Horns on tour with Maroon 5

=== Current members ===
- Carlos Sosa - saxophones
- Fernando “Fernie” Castillo - trumpet
- Raul “Ralo” Vallejo - trombone

=== Past members ===
- Reggie Watkins - trombone
- Paul Armstrong - trumpet
- Serafin Aguilar - trumpet
- Bret Harrell - trombone

== Discography ==
Year	Album	Artist	Credits
2017	Finally, Its Christmas	Hanson	Horns
2017	Jesse & Joy	Jesse & Joy	Brass, Brass Band
2017	Sir Rosevelt	Sir Rosevelt	Horns, arrangements
2017	Lay It On Down	Kenny Wayne Shepherd Band / Kenny Wayne Shepherd	Horns
2015	Un Besito Mas	Jesse & Joy	Horns
2015	Vivir Sin Miedo	Concha Buika	Horns, Arranger
2015	Big Trouble	Outasight	Horns
2014	Dear You	Meiko	Horn Arrangements, Horns
2014	8	Luis Fonsi	Horn Arrangements, Horns
2014	Engelbert Calling	Engelbert Humperdinck	Primary Artist, Horns, Horn Arrangements, Horn Engineer
2014	Viaje	Ricardo Arjona	Horns, Horn arrangements
2013	Confieso Que He Sentido	Manuel Carrasco	Horns, Arrangements
2013	Baby Let's Dance	Shane Filan	Horns
2013	All People (Deluxe)	Michael Franti	Horns
2013	Dirty Word	Dumpstaphunk	Guest Artist, Primary Artist
2013	In a World Like This	Backstreet Boys	Horn, Horn Engineer, Primary Artist
2013	Red Room	The Shadowboxers	Horn Arrangements, Primary Artist
2013	Everything to Me	Shane Filan	Horns
2013	Whut It Dew: The Album	Rapid Ric	Horns
2012	Live at the Moody Theater	Warren Haynes / Warren Haynes Band	Guest Artist, horns
2012	¿Con Quién Se Queda el Perro?	Jesse & Joy	Arranger, Arreglos, Metales
2011	When You Gonna Learn	Beverly Knight	Horns
2011	Everybody Want Sum	Dumpstaphunk	Musicians
2011	Fairplay	Beverly Knight	Horns
2011	Everything Everytime Everywhere	Trevor Hall	Horn, Horn Engineer
2011	Man in Motion	Warren Haynes	Main Personnel
2009	Del Castillo	Del Castillo	Main Personnel
2009	When I Let Go	Paul Wesley	Horn, Horn Arrangements
2008	Thicker Than Water	Vallejo	Primary Artist
2008	We Sing. We Dance. We Steal Things.	Jason Mraz	Arranger
2008	The New World	Bruce Robison	Horns
2007	Future Clouds & Radar	Future Clouds & Radar	Main Personnel
2007	Noble Creatures	The Gourds	Horns
2007	Listen Hear	Dumpstaphunk	Main Personnel
2003	Chinese Vacation	Steve Poltz	Horn Arrangements
2003	Steamboat Live '97	Vallejo	Primary Artist
1999	More Than a Feeling	The Scabs	Horn Arrangements
1998	Boom Boom Baby	The Ugly Americans	Horn Arrangements
1998	Freebird	The Scabs	Horn Arrangements

== Awards ==
Year	Nominee / work	Award	Result
2009	We Sing. We Dance. We Steal Things., Jason Mraz	2009 Teen Choice Awards	Won
2005	Best Groupera Album, La Mafia	Latin Grammy Awards	Won
2004	Spanish Album of the Year, Con Poder, Salvador	35th GMA Dove Awards	Won
1997	Best Horns: Grooveline Horns, The Scabs	Austin Music Awards	Won
1998	Best Horns: Grooveline Horns	Austin Music Awards	Won
1999	Best Horns: Grooveline Horns	Austin Music Awards	Won
2000	Best Horns: Grooveline Horns, The Scabs	Austin Music Awards	Won
2001	Best Horns: Grooveline Horns	Austin Music Awards	Won
2003	Best Horns: Grooveline Horns	Austin Music Awards	Won
2006	Best Horns: Grooveline Horns	Austin Music Awards	Won

== Live guest performances ==
Date	Artist	Location
June 27, 1997	Suicidal Tendencies	Stubb's, Austin
Aug 30, 2009	Dave Matthews Band	Fresno, CA
April 26, 2014	Kenny Wayne Shepherd & Mike Farris	Austin City Limits Hall of Fame Awards
October 28, 2022	Josh Abbott Band	ACL Live, Austin, TX

== Television and video appearances ==
Date	Artist	Show
Apr 3, 2012	Grooveline Horns, Self	Dancing with the Stars, Copchase
Sep 30, 2013	Gary Clark Jr.	Ain't Messin Round Official Music Video, (behind the scenes)
