= In a World Like This Tour =

2013–15 concert tour by the Backstreet Boys

- Tour by Backstreet Boys
- Promotional poster for the tour
- Associated album: In a World Like This
- Start date: May 25, 2013
- End date: June 28, 2015
- Legs: 10
- No. of shows: 176

Backstreet Boys concert chronology
- NKOTBSB Tour (2011–2012); In a World Like This Tour (2013–2015); Backstreet Boys: Larger Than Life (2017–2019)

The In a World Like This Tour (also known as the 20th Anniversary Tour) was the ninth concert tour by American boy band, the Backstreet Boys. Supporting their eighth studio album, In a World Like This, the tour consisted of over 150 shows in Asia, North America, South America and Europe. It is the band's first tour featuring all five original members as a quintet in seven years, as band member Kevin Richardson left the band in June 2006, and rejoined in 2012. It has become one of the biggest tours in the group's tenure.

The tour was the 44th highest grossing worldwide tour in 2014 with total gross of $32.8 million and ticket sales of 607,407. This does not include the tour's 2013 and 2015 dates. The tour also broke record in China, when over 1,000 tickets were sold within one minute in Guangzhou on June 8, 2013.

== Background ==
News of the tour was first released in January 2013, with stops planned for China (known as the 20th Anniversary Tour). Since the initial announcement, the band received a star on the Hollywood Walk of Fame and released the trailer for their upcoming documentary. In May 2013, band member Nick Carter called in to On Air with Ryan Seacrest to state the band were planning a North American tour, alongside their album release. The band officially announced the tour on Good Morning America. According to band member AJ McLean, the concerts will have a theatrical feel, performed as a mini-movie. They will perform their notable songs and tracks from their new album. Fatima Robinson and Rich+Tone will serve as choreographers.

On March 14, 2014, Backstreet Boys appeared via satellite on Good Morning America from Norway, to announce the second North American leg. Avril Lavigne was opening act for the US dates.

=== Chicago incident ===
The sold-out show at the FirstMerit Bank Pavilion was cut short due to the city's curfew. Towards the end of the show, with 5 songs left, the group's microphones were turned off and lights were cut. According to a statement by Live Nation, the concert started late and they hoped to finish by the curfew. However, the show was cut off at 10:55 pm, five minutes short of the curfew. The group promised they would return to Chicago to give their fans a full show, and they announced in 2014 that another show will be held at the same venue on June 11, 2014.

=== Israel cancellation ===
In May 2014, the group announced three concert dates in Israel for July 2014. All three were sold out in an hour and a half. However, in July 2014, they were forced to postpone all three shows for safety reasons due to the 2014 Israel–Gaza conflict. Shortly afterwards, a photo depicting an Israeli mortar shells with the words "That's for cancelling the Backstreet Boys, you scum!" inscribed on its shaft in Hebrew went viral. A few days later another photo went viral, this time depicting four IDF soldiers holding signs in Hebrew which translate to "The reservists" "demand" "the Backstreet Boys" "In Israel!". As of November 2014 the group has not commented on either photo, but they have rescheduled the shows for May 2015 at the same venue.

== Broadcasts and recordings ==
The show on October 11, 2013 in Saitama, Japan was filmed and released on DVD and Blu-ray in Japan on March 28, 2014. There are also special editions including behind-the-scene footage.

== Opening acts ==
- Jesse McCartney (North America—Leg 2, August 2–6, 2013, August 21–22, 2013, August 31, 2013, September 7, 2013)
- DJ Pauly D (North America—Leg 2, August 2–6, 2013, August 21–22, 2013, August 31, 2013, September 7, 2013)
- The Exchange (Europe—Leg 5, March 8–11, 2014, April 1, 2014, April 5, 2014)
- All Saints (United Kingdom & Ireland, April 1–5, 2014)
- Victoria Duffield (Canada—Leg 6, May 3–20, 2014)
- Avril Lavigne (United States—Leg 6, May 22 - June 22, 2014)
- Baylee Littrell (Montreal)
- B5 (Grand Prairie, The Woodlands, Cedar Park)
- Redrama (Helsinki)
- Tippy Dos Santos (Pasay)
- All Our Exes Live in Texas (Australia)

== Setlist ==
Typically a show of this tour consists of 22–23 songs, including an acoustic set of 4–5 songs during which the group members play instruments. Kevin Richardson plays keyboard, Brian Littrell and Nick Carter play acoustic guitar, Howie Dorough plays bass guitar, and AJ McLean plays percussion and Cajón. The acoustic set starts with an a cappella rendition of "Safest Place to Hide" (replaced with "Drowning" since May 2014), and includes one wild card song that vary between shows, such as "Back to Your Heart" in Tuscaloosa, "Just Want You to Know" in Amsterdam, "Trust Me" in London, "Siberia" in Manchester, and "Just To Be Close To You" in Kuala Lumpur.

The following setlist is obtained from the concert held at the Molson Canadian Amphitheatre on August 7, 2013. It is not a representation of all shows on the tour.

1. "The Call"
2. "Don't Want You Back"
3. "Incomplete"
4. "Permanent Stain"
5. "All I Have to Give"
6. "As Long as You Love Me"
7. "Show 'Em (What You're Made Of)"
8. "Show Me the Meaning of Being Lonely"
9. "Breathe"
10. "I'll Never Break Your Heart"
11. "We've Got it Goin' On"
12. "Safest Place to Hide" (a cappella)
13. "10,000 Promises" (acoustic)
14. "Madeleine" (acoustic)
15. "Quit Playing Games (with My Heart)" (acoustic)
16. "The One"
17. "Love Somebody"
18. "More than That"
19. "In a World like This"
20. "I Want It That Way"

Encore

21. "Everybody (Backstreet's Back)"
22. "Larger than Life"

Beginning from the second Asian leg in October 2013, "More Than That" was replaced with "Shape of My Heart". "Safest Place to Hide" was replaced with "Drowning" starting from the San Diego show in May 2014.

== Tour dates ==
Date	City	Country	Venue	Opening Act
Asia
May 25, 2013	Beijing	China	MasterCard Center	
May 28, 2013	Shanghai	China	Shanghai Grand Stage	
May 31, 2013	Chengdu	China	Sichuan Provincial Gymnasium	
June 2, 2013	Fuzhou	China	Fujian Sports Exhibition Hall	
June 6, 2013	Nanjing	China	Wutaishan Gymnasium	
June 8, 2013	Guangzhou	China	Haixinsha Square	
North America
August 2, 2013	Chicago	United States	FirstMerit Bank Pavilion	Jesse McCartney; DJ Pauly D
August 3, 2013	Maryland Heights	United States	Verizon Wireless Amphitheater	Jesse McCartney; DJ Pauly D
August 4, 2013	Toledo	United States	Huntington Center	Jesse McCartney; DJ Pauly D Baylee Littrell
August 6, 2013	Montreal	Canada	Bell Centre	Jesse McCartney; DJ Pauly D Baylee Littrell
August 7, 2013	Toronto	Canada	Molson Canadian Amphitheatre	
August 8, 2013	Clarkston	United States	DTE Energy Music Theatre	
August 9, 2013	Cincinnati	United States	PNC Pavilion	
August 10, 2013	Cleveland	United States	Jacobs Pavilion	
August 12, 2013	Boston	United States	Bank of America Pavilion	
August 13, 2013	Wantagh	United States	Nikon at Jones Beach Theater	
August 15, 2013	Holmdel	United States	PNC Bank Arts Center	
August 16, 2013	Camden	United States	Susquehanna Bank Center	
August 17, 2013	Virginia Beach	United States	Farm Bureau Live	
August 18, 2013	Bristow	United States	Jiffy Lube Live	
August 20, 2013	Raleigh	United States	Time Warner Cable Music Pavilion	
August 21, 2013	Charlotte	United States	Verizon Wireless Amphitheatre	Jesse McCartney; DJ Pauly D
August 22, 2013	Atlanta	United States	Chastain Park Amphitheater	Jesse McCartney; DJ Pauly D
August 23, 2013	Tampa	United States	MidFlorida Credit Union Amphitheatre	
August 25, 2013	West Palm Beach	United States	Cruzan Amphitheatre	
August 26, 2013	Jacksonville	United States	Jacksonville Veterans Memorial Arena	
August 27, 2013	Tuscaloosa	United States	Tuscaloosa Amphitheater	
August 28, 2013	Tupelo	United States	BancorpSouth Arena	
August 30, 2013	Grand Prairie	United States	Verizon Theatre at Grand Prairie	
August 31, 2013	The Woodlands	United States	Cynthia Woods Mitchell Pavilion	Jesse McCartney; DJ Pauly D B5
September 1, 2013	Cedar Park	United States	Cedar Park Center	
September 4, 2013	Los Angeles	United States	Gibson Amphitheatre	
September 5, 2013	Phoenix	United States	Comerica Theatre	
September 6, 2013	Irvine	United States	Verizon Wireless Amphitheatre	
September 7, 2013	Las Vegas	United States	Mandalay Bay Events Center	Jesse McCartney; DJ Pauly D Baylee Littrell
September 8, 2013	Concord	United States	Sleep Train Pavilion	
September 14, 2013^{[A]}	Boston	United States	Hatch Memorial Shell	
Asia (Leg 2)
October 2, 2013	Nagoya	Japan	Nippon Gaishi Hall	
October 3, 2013	Nagoya	Japan	Nippon Gaishi Hall	
October 5, 2013	Hamamatsu	Japan	Hamamatsu Arena	
October 7, 2013	Hiroshima	Japan	Hiroshima Green Arena	
October 8, 2013	Fukuoka	Japan	FICC Main Hall	
October 11, 2013	Saitama	Japan	Saitama Super Arena	
October 12, 2013	Saitama	Japan	Saitama Super Arena	
October 13, 2013	Saitama	Japan	Saitama Super Arena	
October 15, 2013	Kobe	Japan	World Memorial Hall	
October 16, 2013	Kobe	Japan	World Memorial Hall	
October 17, 2013	Tokyo	Japan	Tokyo International Forum	
North America (Leg 2)
December 4, 2013^{[B]}	Sacramento	United States	Ace of Spades	
December 6, 2013^{[C]}	Chicago	United States	Chicago Theatre	
December 8, 2013^{[D]}	St. Charles	United States	Family Arena	
December 9, 2013^{[E]}	Cleveland	United States	House of Blues	
December 10, 2013^{[F]}	Pittsburgh	United States	Petersen Events Center	
December 13, 2013^{[G]}	Towson	United States	SECU Arena	
December 14, 2013^{[H]}	Wallingford	United States	Toyota Oakdale Theatre	
December 16, 2013^{[I]}	Duluth	United States	Arena at Gwinnett Center	
December 17, 2013^{[J]}	Lake Buena Vista	United States	House of Blues	
December 18, 2013^{[K]}	Houston	United States	Bayou Music Center	
Europe
February 18, 2014	Lisbon	Portugal	Campo Pequeno	
February 19, 2014	Madrid	Spain	Palacio Vistalegre	
February 20, 2014	Barcelona	Spain	Sant Jordi Club	
February 22, 2014	Milan	Italy	Mediolanum Forum	
February 23, 2014	Warsaw	Poland	Torwar Hall	
February 24, 2014	Minsk	Belarus	Minsk Arena	
February 26, 2014	Moscow	Russia	Crocus City Hall	
February 27, 2014	Saint Petersburg	Russia	A2 Arena	
March 3, 2014	Munich	Germany	Olympiahalle	
March 4, 2014	Berlin	Germany	O_{2} World	
March 7, 2014	Helsinki	Finland	Hartwall Areena	
March 8, 2014	Stavanger	Norway	DNB Arena	The Exchange; Sandra
March 9, 2014	Oslo	Norway	Oslo Spektrum	The Exchange; Sandra
March 10, 2014	Trondheim	Norway	Trondheim Spektrum	The Exchange; Sandra
March 13, 2014	Stockholm	Sweden	Hovet	
March 14, 2014	Gothenburg	Sweden	Scandinavium	
March 15, 2014	Copenhagen	Denmark	Forum Copenhagen	
March 17, 2014	Oberhausen	Germany	König Pilsener Arena	
March 18, 2014	Paris	France	Zénith de Paris	
March 19, 2014	Zürich	Switzerland	Hallenstadion	
March 20, 2014	Mannheim	Germany	SAP Arena	
March 22, 2014	Antwerp	Belgium	Sportpaleis	
March 23, 2014	Hanover	Germany	TUI Arena	
March 24, 2014	Rotterdam	Netherlands	Rotterdam Ahoy Sportpaleis	
March 26, 2014	Birmingham	England	LG Arena	
March 28, 2014	Düsseldorf	Germany	ISS Dome	
March 29, 2014	Hamburg	Germany	O_{2} World Hamburg	
March 30, 2014	Amsterdam	Netherlands	Heineken Music Hall	
April 1, 2014	Dublin	Ireland	The O_{2}	The Exchange; All Saints
April 3, 2014	Glasgow	Scotland	SSE Hydro	The Exchange; All Saints
April 4, 2014	London	England	The O_{2} Arena	The Exchange; All Saints
April 5, 2014	Manchester	England	Phones 4u Arena	The Exchange; All Saints
North America (Leg 3)
May 3, 2014	Moncton	Canada	Moncton Coliseum	Victoria Duffield
May 4, 2014	Halifax	Canada	Halifax Metro Centre	Victoria Duffield
May 6, 2014	Kingston	Canada	Rogers K-Rock Centre	Victoria Duffield
May 7, 2014	London	Canada	Budweiser Gardens	Victoria Duffield
May 8, 2014	Hamilton	Canada	FirstOntario Centre	Victoria Duffield
May 11, 2014	Winnipeg	Canada	MTS Centre	Victoria Duffield
May 13, 2014	Moose Jaw	Canada	Mosaic Place	Victoria Duffield
May 14, 2014	Lethbridge	Canada	Enmax Centre	Victoria Duffield
May 16, 2014	Calgary	Canada	Scotiabank Saddledome	Victoria Duffield
May 17, 2014	Edmonton	Canada	Rexall Place	Victoria Duffield
May 18, 2014	Dawson Creek	Canada	EnCana Events Centre	Victoria Duffield
May 20, 2014	Vancouver	Canada	Rogers Arena	Victoria Duffield
May 22, 2014	Seattle	United States	WaMu Theater	Avril Lavigne
May 24, 2014	Wheatland	United States	Sleep Train Amphitheatre	Avril Lavigne
May 25, 2014	Mountain View	United States	Shoreline Amphitheatre	Avril Lavigne
May 28, 2014	San Diego	United States	Viejas Arena	Avril Lavigne
May 29, 2014	Inglewood	United States	The Forum	Avril Lavigne
May 30, 2014	Las Vegas	United States	The AXIS	Avril Lavigne
May 31, 2014	Las Vegas	United States	The AXIS	Avril Lavigne
June 2, 2014	Albuquerque	United States	Isleta Amphitheater	Avril Lavigne
June 4, 2014	Corpus Christi	United States	American Bank Center Arena	Avril Lavigne
June 5, 2014	The Woodlands	United States	Cynthia Woods Mitchell Pavilion	Avril Lavigne
June 6, 2014	Oklahoma City	United States	Chesapeake Energy Arena	Avril Lavigne
June 7, 2014	Kansas City	United States	Starlight Theatre	Avril Lavigne
June 9, 2014	Omaha	United States	CenturyLink Center	Avril Lavigne
June 10, 2014	Saint Paul	United States	Xcel Energy Center	Avril Lavigne
June 11, 2014	Chicago	United States	FirstMerit Bank Pavilion	Avril Lavigne
June 13, 2014	Noblesville	United States	Klipsch Music Center	Avril Lavigne
June 14, 2014	Burgettstown	United States	First Niagara Pavilion	Avril Lavigne
June 15, 2014	Cincinnati	United States	Riverbend Music Center	Avril Lavigne
June 17, 2014	Clarkston	United States	DTE Energy Music Theatre	Avril Lavigne
June 18, 2014	Darien	United States	Darien Lake Performing Arts Center	Avril Lavigne
June 20, 2014	Mansfield	United States	Xfinity Center	Avril Lavigne
June 21, 2014	Camden	United States	Susquehana Bank Center	Avril Lavigne
June 22, 2014	Wantagh	United States	Nikon at Jones Beach Theater	Avril Lavigne
Europe (Leg 2)
June 29, 2014^{[L]}	Ipswich	England	Chantry Park	
July 6, 2014^{[M]}	London	England	Hyde Park	
July 9, 2014^{[N]}	Aalborg	Denmark	Skovdalen	
July 10, 2014	Ballerup	Denmark	Ballerup Super Arena	
July 11, 2014^{[O]}	Kristiansand	Norway	Bendiksbukta	
July 12, 2014^{[P]}	Fredrikstad	Norway	Kongsten Fort	
July 15, 2014	Vienna	Austria	Wiener Stadthalle	
July 17, 2014^{[Q]}	Zürich	Switzerland	Dolder Grand	
July 18, 2014^{[R]}	Locarno	Switzerland	Piazza Grande	
July 20, 2014	Ostend	Belgium	Ostend Beach	
July 22, 2014	Cattolica	Italy	Arena della Regina	
July 23, 2014^{[T]}	Lucca	Italy	Piazza Napoleone	
July 27, 2014	Gdańsk	Poland	Ergo Arena	
Asia (Leg 3)
April 16, 2015	Wuhan	China	Hongshan Gymnasium	
April 18, 2015	Beijing	China	MasterCard Center	
April 19, 2015	Dalian	China	Zhongsheng Center	
April 22, 2015	Kowloon	Hong Kong	Star Hall	
April 23, 2015	Kowloon	Hong Kong	Star Hall	
April 24, 2015	Cotai	Macau	Cotai Arena	
April 26, 2015	Chongqing	China	International Convention & Exhibition Center	
April 28, 2015	Shanghai	China	Shanghai Indoor Stadium	
April 30, 2015	Taipei	Taiwan	University of Taipei Gymnasium	
May 2, 2015	Singapore		The Star Performing Arts Centre	
May 3, 2015	Kuala Lumpur	Malaysia	Stadium Negara	
May 5, 2015	Pasay	Philippines	Mall of Asia Arena	
May 6, 2015	Bangkok	Thailand	Impact Arena	
Oceania
May 8, 2015	Melbourne	Australia	Rod Laver Arena	
May 9, 2015	Sydney	Australia	Allphones Arena	
May 10, 2015	Brisbane	Australia	Brisbane Entertainment Centre	
May 12, 2015	Auckland	New Zealand	Vector Arena	
May 15, 2015	Perth	Australia	Perth Arena	
Middle East
May 19, 2015	Ra'anana	Israel	Ra'anana Amphitheater	
May 20, 2015	Ra'anana	Israel	Ra'anana Amphitheater	
May 21, 2015	Ra'anana	Israel	Ra'anana Amphitheater	
Latin America
June 6, 2015	Recife	Brazil	Chevrolet Hall	
June 8, 2015	Rio de Janeiro	Brazil	Citibank Hall	
June 9, 2015	Belo Horizonte	Brazil	Chevrolet Hall	
June 11, 2015	Rio de Janeiro	Brazil	Citibank Hall	
June 12, 2015	São Paulo	Brazil	Citibank Hall	
June 13, 2015	São Paulo	Brazil	Citibank Hall	
June 14, 2015	São Paulo	Brazil	Citibank Hall	
June 15, 2015	Porto Alegre	Brazil	Pepsi on Stage	
June 17, 2015	Buenos Aires	Argentina	Estadio Luna Park	
June 19, 2015	Santiago	Chile	Movistar Arena	
June 22, 2015	Mexico City	Mexico	Auditorio Nacional	
June 23, 2015	Mexico City	Mexico	Auditorio Nacional	
June 24, 2015	Mexico City	Mexico	Auditorio Nacional	
June 25, 2015	Mexico City	Mexico	Auditorio Nacional	
June 27, 2015	Zapopan	Mexico	Telmex Auditorium	
June 28, 2015	Monterrey	Mexico	Auditorio Banamex	

Festivals and other miscellaneous performances

^{A} This concert was a part of "Mixfest"
^{B} This concert was a part of the "Santa Slam"
^{C} This concert was a part of the "Miracle on State Street"
^{D} This concert was a part of the "Mistletoe Show"
^{E} This concert was a part of the "Holiday Ho Show"
^{F} This concert was a part of "O Starry Night"
^{G} This concert was a part of the "Mistletoe Meltdown"
^{H} This concert was a part of the "All Star Christmas"
^{I} This concert was a part of "Jingle Jam"
^{J} This concert was a part of "All I Want for Christmas"
^{K} This concert was a part of "T'was the Week before Christmas"
^{L} This concert was a part of the "East Coast Live"
^{M} This concert was a part of the "Barclaycard British Summer Time Festival"
^{N} This concert was a part of the "Skovrock"
^{O} This concert was a part of the "Odderøya Live"
^{P} This concert was a part of the "Tall Ships Races"
^{Q} This concert was a part of the "Live at Sunset"
^{R} This concert was a part of the "Moon and Stars"
^{S} This concert was a part of the "Lucca Summer Festival"

Cancellations and rescheduled shows

May 26, 2013	Shenzhen, China	Shenzhen Bay Sports Center Gymnasium	Cancelled
August 4, 2013	Toledo	Toledo Zoo Amphitheater	Moved to the Huntington Center
June 27, 2014	Liverpool, England	Echo Arena Liverpool	Cancelled. This concert was set to be a part of a live event titled "Pop Across the Mersey" featuring also Blue, Westlife’s Kian Egan, and Czech girl group 5Angels.
June 28, 2014	Weston-super-Mare, England	Weston-super-Mare Beach	Cancelled. This concert was a part of the "South West Live"
July 19, 2014	Essen, Germany	Stadion Essen	Cancelled
July 25, 2014	Berlin, Germany	Waldbühne	Cancelled
July 26, 2014	Leipzig, Germany	Völkerschlachtdenkmal	Cancelled
July 29, 2014	Ra'anana, Israel	Ra'anana Amphitheater	Rescheduled to May 19, 2015
July 30, 2014	Ra'anana, Israel	Ra'anana Amphitheater	Rescheduled to May 20, 2015
July 31, 2014	Ra'anana, Israel	Ra'anana Amphitheater	Rescheduled to May 21, 2015

=== Box office score data ===
Venue	City	Tickets sold / available	Gross revenue
Bell Centre	Montreal	18,000 / 18,000 (100%)	$837,911
Jacksonville Veterans Memorial Arena	Jacksonville	6,717 / 6,717 (100%)	$217,507
Tuscaloosa Amphitheater	Tuscaloosa	6,484 / 6,484 (100%)	$264,289
Verizon Theatre at Grand Prairie	Grand Prairie	5,402 / 6,157 (88%)	$309,423
O_{2} World	Berlin	10,059 / 12,575 (80%)	$640,162
Hallenstadion	Zürich	10,059 / 13,000 (77%)	$686,695
Sportpaleis	Antwerp	12,466 / 14,129 (88%)	$829,556
O_{2} World Hamburg	Hamburg	8,152 / 8,152 (100%)	$503,925
The O_{2} Arena	London	15,096 / 15,504 (97%)	$877,687
Phones 4u Arena	Manchester	10,814 / 10,814 (100%)	$552,924
Moncton Coliseum	Moncton	4,770 / 4,770 (100%)	$254,490
Halifax Metro Centre	Halifax	7,340 / 7,340 (100%)	$378,819
Rogers K-Rock Centre	Kingston	4,346 / 4,346 (100%)	$290,565
Budweiser Gardens	London	5,321 / 6,293 (84%)	$361,503
FirstOntario Centre	Hamilton	7,722 / 9,295 (83%)	$502,815
The Forum	Inglewood	9,310 / 10,287 (90%)	$422,260
The AXIS	Las Vegas	5,976 / 9,594 (62%)	$474,874
DTE Energy Music Theatre	Clarkston	13,708 / 14,530 (94%)	$419,043
Rod Laver Arena	Melbourne	11,149 / 11,149 (100%)	$878,745
Allphones Arena	Sydney	12,960 / 12,960 (100%)	$1,034,270
Brisbane Entertainment Centre	Brisbane	6,708 / 6,708 (100%)	$521,933
Auditorio Nacional	Mexico City	37,786 / 38,378 (98%)	$1,958,071
Auditorio Telmex	Guadalajara	7,800 / 8,135 (96%)	$436,565
Auditorio Banamex	Monterrey	6,190 / 6,770 (91%)	$423,148
TOTAL		244,335 / 262,535 (93%)	$14,077,177
