= Con Poder =

Con Poder may refer to:

- Con Poder (Salvador album), 2003
- Con Poder (Vico C album), 1996
