= Into Motion =

Studio album by Salvador
- Released: June 4, 2002
- Genre: Christian music, Christian pop, Christian rock
- Label: Word
- Producer: Pete Kipley, Chris Rodriguez, Nic Gonzales

Salvador chronology
Salvador (2000)	Into Motion (2002)	Con Poder (2003)

Into Motion is the second album released by Salvador. The album reached 198 on the Billboard top 200.

== Track listing ==
1. "Breathing Life" (Cindy Morgan, Chris Rodriguez) - 3:37
2. "City On A Hill" (Cindy Morgan, Chris Rodriguez) - 4:32
3. "When I Pray" (Pete Kipley, Brad O'Donnell) - 4:15
4. "Can't Keep It In" (Nic Gonzales, Pete Kipley, David Mullen, Matthew West) - 3:12
5. "Black Flower" (Nic Gonzales, David Mullen) - 5:03
6. "God People" (Nic Gonzales, David Mullen, Andy Selby) - 2:51
7. "Alegria" (Steve Coronado) - 2:24
8. "Psalm 3" (Art Gonzales, Josh Gonzales, Nic Gonzales) -5:22
9. "Salt and Light" (Nic Gonzales, Chris Rodriguez) - 4:48
10. "Worthy" (Pablo Gabaldon, Nic Gonzales, David Mullen) - 3:35
11. "Mighty King Of Love" (Nic Gonzales, Pete Kipley, Billy Sprague) - 2:43

== Personnel ==
Salvador

- Nic Gonzales – guitars, lead vocals, backing vocals
- Chris Bevins – keyboards
- Josh Gonzales – bass, backing vocals
- Art Gonzales – drums
- Eliot Torres – percussion, backing vocals
- Billy Griego – trombone, backing vocals
- Pablo Gabaldon – trumpet

Additional musicians

- Carl Hergesell – keyboards
- Craig Young – programming, bass
- Chris Rodriguez – guitars, backing vocals
- Pete Kipley – guitars, loops
- Bruce Hughes – bass
- Dan Needham – drums
- Carlos Sosa – saxophones, horn arrangements
- Raul Vallejo – trombone, horn arrangements
- Paul Armstrong – trumpet
- David Davidson – string arrangements
- Gene Miller – backing vocals

== Production ==
- Judith Hibbard – executive producer, A&R direction
- Chris Rodriguez – producer (1, 2, 8, 9)
- Pete Kipley – producer (3–6, 10, 11), hard disk editing (3–6, 10, 11)
- Nic Gonzales – producer (7)
- Craig Young – recording (1, 2, 8, 9), overdub recording
- F. Reid Shippen – mixing (1, 2, 7, 8, 9)
- Csaba Petocz – recording (3–6, 10, 11), mixing (3–6, 10, 11)
- Steve Chadie – recording (7), mix assistant (7)
- Carlos Sosa – overdub recording
- Dan Shike – mix assistant (3–6, 10, 11)
- Tom Coyne – mastering
- Cheryl T. McTyre – A&R coordinator
- Jamie Kiner – production coordinator (1, 2, 7, 8, 9)
- Bridgett Evans O'Lannerghty – production coordinator (3–6, 10, 11)
- Louis LaPrad – art direction
- Katherine Petillo – art direction
- Roy Roper – design, illustration
- Kenny Braun – photography
- Michael Smith & Associates – management

Studios

- Recorded at Arlyn Studios (Austin, Texas); The Indigo Room (Franklin, Tennessee).
- Mixed at Recording Arts (Nashville, Tennessee); Opium Sound (Hollywood, California).
- Mastered at Sterling Sound (New York City, New York).
