= So Natural =

So Natural may refer to:

- So Natural (Lisa Stansfield album), 1993
- "So Natural" (song), a 1993 song by Lisa Stansfield
- So Natural (Salvador album), 2004
- So Natural (brand), a food brand
