= El Último Trago =

Studio album by Concha Buika and Chucho Valdés
- Released: 2009
- Recorded: April 2009, Abdala Studios, Cuba and Casa Limón studios by Melisa Nani and Salomé Limón
- Genre: Cuban jazz, rancheras
- Length: 45:43
- Label: Warner Music Spain
- Producer: Javier Limón

Concha Buika and Chucho Valdés chronology
Niña de Fuego (2008)	El Último Trago (2009)	La Noche Más Larga (2013)

Chucho Valdés chronology
Juntos Para Siempre (2008)	El Último Trago (2009)	Chucho's Steps (2010)

Professional ratings
Review scores
Source	Rating
Allmusic	4/5 stars
Tom Hull	B+

El Último Trago is a 2009 studio album by Spanish singer Concha Buika and Cuban pianist Chucho Valdés, produced by Javier Limón.

== Overview ==
Javier Limón describes the concept of the album as bringing together "Afro-Cuban Jazz idol" Chucho Valdés with "Afro-Flamenco Jazz" singer Buika, working on the ranchera songs originally sung by Costa Rican-Mexican Chavela Vargas.

It features a note written by director Pedro Almodóvar, who had worked repeatedly with Vargas. Almodóvar made a glowing evaluation of the album, with an emphasis on Buika's renditions.

== Reception ==
Michael G. Nastos in his review for AllMusic stated, "It's unlikely you'll find a better pairing of an amazing singer and accompanist anywhere else, no matter the music type, but if you enjoy the classic Latin song performed with every ounce of emotion available, this recording will be impossible to resist."

== Track listing ==
1. Soledad (written by Fabregat Jodar)
2. Sombras (music by Carlos Brito, lyrics by Rosario Sansores)
3. Las Ciudades (written by José Alfredo Jiménez Sandoval)
4. Cruz De Olvido (written by Juan Zaizar Torres)
5. El Andariego (written by Álvaro Carrillo)
6. En El Último Trago (written by José Alfredo Jiménez Sandoval)
7. Se Me Hizo Fácil (written by Agustín Lara)
8. Un Mundo Raro (written by José Alfredo Jiménez Sandoval)
9. Las Simples Cosas (music by Armando Tejada Gómez, lyrics by Julio César Isella)
10. Somos (written by Mario Clavell)
11. Luz De Luna (written by Álvaro Carrillo)
12. Vámonos (written by José Alfredo Jiménez Sandoval)
