= La Noche Más Larga =

Studio album by Concha Buika
- Released: June 4, 2013
- Studios: Sear Sound, New York City
- Genres: Flamenco, Jazz, Latin
- Length: 56:40
- Label: Warner Music Spain 2564645174
- Producers: Ivan "Melon" Lewis, Concha Buika

Concha Buika chronology
El Último Trago (2009)	La Noche Más Larga (2013)	Vivir Sin Miedo (2015)

Professional ratings
Review scores
Source	Rating
Allmusic	4.5/5 stars
The Guardian	3/5 stars

La Noche Más Larga is the fifth studio album by Spanish singer Concha Buika. The record was released on June 4, 2013 via Warner Music Spain label.

== Plot ==
Neil Spenser of The Guardian stated "Now relocated to Miami, she's clearly reaching for a pan-American audience on this sixth album. It's an eclectic affair, taking her acrobatic flamenco vocals into a more jazz flavoured zone and mixing her songs with covers of Jacques Brel and Abbey Lincoln."

Angel Romero of World Music Central said " Vivir sin miedo presents another eclectic mix with a Caribbean flavor and smooth pop flavor, including reggae, dub, ragga, flamenco, R&B, afrobeat, pop and gospel, although the dub feel seems to permeate most of the album. Buika is also trying to appeal to a wider audience so she sings in a mix of Spanish and English."

== Track listing ==
No.	Title	Writer(s)	Length
1.	"Sueño con ella"	Buika
2.	"Siboney"	Ernesto Lecuona
3.	"Ne me quitte pas"	Jacques Brel
4.	"Yo vengo a ofrecer mi corazón"	Rodolfo Páez
5.	"La nave del olvido"	Dino Ramos
6.	"La noche más larga"	Buika
7.	"Don't Explain"	Arthur Herzog, Jr., Billie Holiday
8.	"No lo sé (featuring Pat Metheny)"	Buika
9.	"Santa Lucía"	Roque Narvaja
10.	"Los solos"	Buika
11.	"Como era"	Buika
12.	"Throw It Away"	Abbey Lincoln
13.	"In Her Family"	Pat Metheny / Buika
Total length:			56:40

- All music arranged by Iván "Melon" Lewis and Ramón Porrina.

== Personnel ==
- Buika - Vocals
- Iván "Melon" Lewis – Musical direction, piano, keyboards, percussion
- Carlos de Motril – Flamenco guitar
- Juan José "Paquete" Suárez – Flamenco guitar
- Alain Pérez – Electric bass
- John Benítez – Bass
- Dafnis Prieto – Drums
- Israel "Piraña" Suarez – Percussion
- Ramón Porrina – Percussion, backing vocals
- Pedrito Martínez – Percussion, backing vocals
- Genara Cortés – Backing vocals
- Alicia Morales – Backing vocals
- Saray Muñoz – Backing vocals
- Carlos Sarduy – Trumpet (tracks 2, 5)
- "Dizzy" Daniel Moorehead – Saxophone (2)
- Pat Metheny – Guitar (8)

Production

- Recording engineer – Ted Tuthill assisted by Owen Mulholland
- Additional engineers – Alonso Cano, Santiago Quizhpe
- Mix – Carlos Álvarez
- Mastering – Mike Fuller
- Producer (N.Y. Sessions) – Eli Wolf
- Executive Producers - Concha Buika, Iván "Melon" Lewis, Ramón Porrina
