= Dismiss the Mystery =

Studio album by Salvador
- Released: August 29, 2006
- Genre: Christian rock, contemporary Christian music, Latin rock
- Label: Word
- Producer: Otto Price (executive); Nic Gonzales, Chris Bevins

Salvador chronology
Que Tan Lejos Esta Cielo (2005)	Dismiss the Mystery (2006)	Aware (2008)

Professional ratings
Review scores
Source	Rating
Jesus Freak Hideout	4/5 stars

Dismiss the Mystery is the seventh studio album released by the Christian rock band, Salvador.

The single "Shine" off the release ranked number No. 2 on Billboard's Hot Christian Songs and number No. 20 on their Christian Songs (Year End).

Christian songwriter Jason Ingram received the 2007 SESAC "Christian Songwriter of the Year" award with "Shine" being one of his most notable contributions.

== Track listing ==
No.	Title	Writer(s)	Length
1.	"Now That I Have You"	Nic Gonzales, Jason Ingram, Chris Rodriguez	4:35
2.	"Find the Reason"	Gonzales, Akil Thompson	4:11
3.	"Shine"	Gonzales, Ingram	3:24
4.	"Te Enaltezco Dios"	Gonzales, Val Clemente, Rick Cua	4:49
5.	"Waterfall"	Gonzales, Ingram	3:39
6.	"None Greater Than You"	Gonzales, Jimmy Collins, Ben Kolarcik	3:56
7.	"You Are So Wonderful"	Gonzales, Chris Bevins, Antonio Phelon	4:10
8.	"Trying to Be the Sun"	Gonzales, Clint Lagerberg	4:21
9.	"Always a Whisper"	Gonzales, Don Chaffer	4:47
10.	"Neighbor"	Gonzales, Lagerberg, Cindy Morgan	4:30
11.	"Simple Things"	Gonzales, Matt Bronlewee, Ingram	3:44
12.	"Child of the King"	Gonzales, Rodriguez	3:36
Total length:			49:42

- "Te Enaltezco Dios" is sung completely in Spanish.

== Personnel ==
- Composer - Akil Thompson
- Translation - Alejandro Allen
- Mastering - Andrew Mendelson
- Composer - Antonio Phelon
- Assistant Engineer - Boo Macleod
- Mixing - Brian Lenox
- A&R - Cheryl H. McTyre
- Composer, Engineer, Group Member, Horn Arrangements, Keyboards, Producer, Programming, Background Vocals - Chris Bevins
- Composer - Chris Rodriguez
- Composer - Cindy Morgan
- Composer - Don Chaffer
- Mixing - Drew Douthit
- Flugelhorn, Group Member, Trumpet, Background Vocals - Edwin Santiago
- Group Member, Horn Arrangements, Saxophone, Trombone, Background Vocals - Jared Solis
- Cover Design, Creative Director - Katherine Petillo
- Grooming - Lucy Santamassino
- Composer - Matt Bronleewee
- Assistant Engineer - Mike Hersh
- Composer, Group Member, Acoustic Guitar, Electric Guitar, Producer, Vocals - Nicki Gonzalez Band
- A&R, Executive Producer - Otto Price
- Design - Ray Roper
- Composer - Composer
- Bells, Bongos, Clavinet, Congas, Guiro, Timbales - Robert Vilera
- Primary Artist - Salvador
- Mixing - Shane D. Wilson
- Translation - Susana Allen
- Photography - Thomas Petillo
- Composer - Valerie Clemente

== Chart performance ==
Chart (2006)	Peak positions
U.S. Billboard Heatseekers Albums	29
U.S. Billboard Christian Albums	25
