= Buika (album) =

Studio album by Concha Buika
- Released: March 15, 2005
- Genres: World fusion, jazz, copla, funk
- Length: 51:05
- Label: DRO Atlantic 0825646323722

Concha Buika chronology
Buika (2005)	Mi Niña Lola (2006)

Professional ratings
Review scores
Source	Rating
Allmusic	4/5 stars

Buika is the debut studio album by Spanish singer Concha Buika. The album was released on March 15, 2005 via DRO Atlantic label.

== Overview ==
The record fuses jazz, traditional Spanish music, electronica, funk, and several other elements.

== Track listing ==
All songs written by Concha Buika except where otherwise specified.

1. New afro Spanish generation
2. Little freaky girl
3. Jodida pero contenta
4. Échate a mi vera
5. Qué pasa
6. Talk to me (Háblame), written by José Vera Lopez
7. Se me escapan las palabras
8. Tu caramelo
9. Soleá de libertad
10. Niña de fiesta + Bailando mi pena
11. Nostalgias, music by Juan Carlos Cobián, lyrics by Enrique Domingo Cadícamo
