= In a World Like This =

Studio album by Backstreet Boys
- Released: July 30, 2013
- Recorded: July 23, 2012 – March 2013; Los Angeles, California
- Length: 43:03
- Labels: K-BAHN; BMG
- Producers: Kristian Lundin; Jaakko Manninen; Max Martin; Dan Muckala; Andreas Olsson; Jordan Omley; Morgan Taylor Reid; Glen Scott; Martin Terefe; Justin Trugman

Backstreet Boys chronology
NKOTBSB (2011)	In a World Like This (2013)	The Essential Backstreet Boys (2013)

Singles from In a World Like This
- 1. "In a World Like This" Released: June 25, 2013; 2. "Show 'Em (What You're Made Of)" Released: November 18, 2013

In a World Like This is the eighth studio album (seventh in the United States) by American group Backstreet Boys. It was released on July 30, 2013, through the group's own K-BAHN record label, under license to BMG Rights Management, and distributed by RED Distribution. Although it serves as the follow-up to This Is Us (2009), it is the first album since Never Gone (2005) to feature Kevin Richardson, who left the group in 2006 and rejoined in 2012. It was also their first independent album since leaving their old label Jive Records in 2010.

Critics saw the album as a mature and well-crafted effort, but often too safe, bland, or less memorable than Backstreet Boys' earlier work. In a World Like This debuted strongly worldwide, topping Japan's Oricon chart, reaching the top five in several countries, and becoming band's highest-charting US album since 2005 despite lower sales than earlier releases. Overall sales were solid but modest, with Gold certification in Japan, 180,100 copies sold in the US, and mixed chart performance across Europe and Asia.

On May 20, 2013, the group released "Permanent Stain" as a promotional single. A free song download was offered with a ticket for their In a World Like This Tour. The first single from the album, also titled "In a World Like This" premiered on Z100 New York on June 18, 2013 and was released on June 25, 2013. The album was supported by the In a World Like This Tour, which started in China on May 24, 2013, and finished on June 28, 2015. The tour consists of over 150 shows in 11 legs worldwide so far.

== Background and recording ==
On May 25, 2010, Backstreet Boys, still a quartet without Kevin Richardson at the time, left their long-time label, Jive Records. The group then was looking to sign with Interscope Records, but the members couldn't agree on whether to take a one-album deal or a three-album deal. In June 2010, Nick Carter revealed that they had started working on new material for the next album, and Brian Littrell said in a separate interview that they were planning to release the album in early 2011. However, in late 2010 they teamed up with New Kids On The Block for a joint tour called NKOTBSB, planned for 2011, so they had to push back the release of the album as they had to find time to work on the album in between tour dates. In March 2011, during a press conference in Vietnam, the band stated that for the first time, they had complete creative control because they were no longer with Jive.

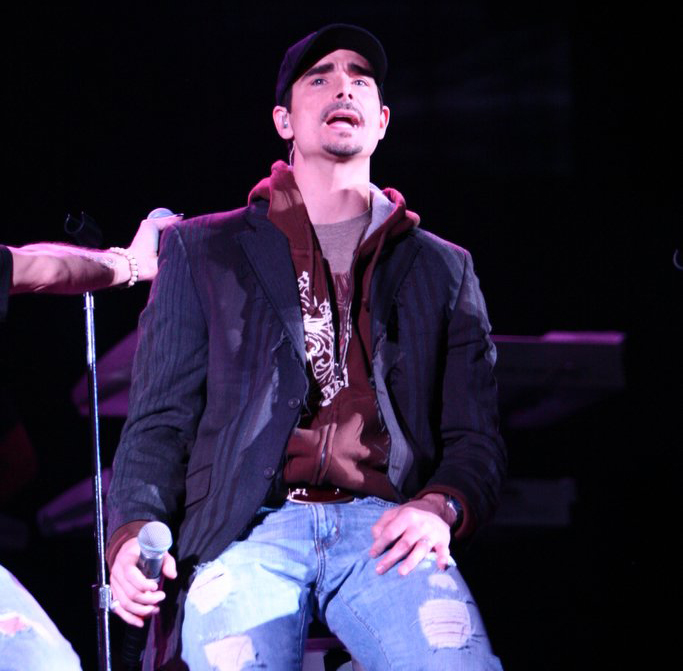
This is the Backstreet Boys' first album with Kevin Richardson back in the group since their 2005 album Never Gone.

In November 2011, after the US leg of the NKOTBSB tour ended, Carter said in an interview that they hoped to get a single out in the spring of 2012 and the album in the summer of 2012. However, Carter's sister Leslie's unexpected death at the end of January 2012 made the group once again postpone the recording until the end of February 2012 to give him time to cope with his loss. Howie Dorough stated later that month that they would not rush the album and would try to release it in 2012 or 2013 at the latest.

In April 2012, a week before the European leg of the NKOTBSB tour started, the group, along with original member Kevin Richardson, went to London to meet with producer Martin Terefe and to write some songs. On April 29, 2012, the group announced that Richardson had rejoined them permanently and in July 2012, all five members moved into a house together all by themselves in London to work on the new album. Besides Terefe, they also wrote songs with Sacha Skarbek and Craig David while in London, and in the US they worked with Morgan Taylor Reid, Mika Guillory, GoodWill & MGI, Lucas Hilbert, Geo Slam, and Porcelain Black. On July 27, 2012, the group held a lottery for fans to win a chance to hear rough mixes of their new album at their studio in London.

The group stated that Take That's reunion record Progress and Progress Live tour inspired the album.

== Writing and musical style ==
In July 2012, Richardson stated in an interview that the album would be authentic and personal and that they hoped Terefe would produce the entire record. he group was heavily involved in the songwriting process, with many tracks drawing directly from their own life experiences. Carter explained that the band deliberately avoided making a traditional boy band album and did not want to record songs they had not written themselves. Richardson also revealed that he had written a song about his son, emphasizing the album's autobiographical nature: "We want it to be a personal album that reflects what's happening in our lives right now [...] A.J. is about to become a father, and Howie, Brian, and I are already fathers, so we’re focused on making a record that feels honest and personal." In a separate interview with Clizbeats, Carter addressed the idea of reinvention and drastic change, noting that he did not feel the group was at that stage in their career anymore. Musically, the album blends modern pop, adult contemporary, and dance elements, with touches of the singer-songwriter genre evident on tracks such as "Try," "Madeleine," and "Trust Me."

== Promotion ==
On April 20, 2013, during a 20th-anniversary celebration event, Backstreet Boys previewed eight new songs, including "Soldier," "In Your Arms," "Show 'Em (What You're Made Of)," "Trust Me," "Permanent Stain," "Hot, Hot, Hot," "Try," and "Breathe". The following day, they posted a video containing the previews of six of the new songs on their YouTube channel. On May 15, 2013, the group performed "Permanent Stain" for the very first time on ABC morning television program Good Morning America. On GMA, they also announced that the purchase of each ticket for their In a World Like This Tour would include a free download of "Permanent Stain," co-written by band member Nick Carter. A lyric video for the song was released on their YouTube Channel the following day.

=== Singles ===
The first single from the album, the album's title track, premiered on Z100 New York on June 18, 2013 and was released on June 25, 2013. "Show 'Em (What You're Made Of)" was released as the second worldwide single on November 18, 2013. A music video for the song was filmed in October 2013 and released on November 19, 2013.

=== Tour ===
The album was supported by the In a World Like This Tour, which started in China on May 24, 2013, and finished on June 28, 2015. The tour consisted of over 150 shows in 11 legs worldwide so far.

== Critical reception ==
Professional ratings
Aggregate scores
Source	Rating
Metacritic	60/100
Review scores
Source	Rating
AllMusic	3.5/5 stars
Daily Express	3/5 stars
Digital Spy	3/5 stars
The Guardian	3/5 stars
Idolator	4/5 stars
Los Angeles Times	2.5/4 stars
Newsday	C
PopMatters	6/10
Rolling Stone	2/5 stars
Slant Magazine	2/5 stars

In a World Like This received mixed to positive reviews from music critics. At Metacritic, which assigns a normalized rating out of 100 to reviews from mainstream critics, the album received an average score of 60, which indicates "mixed or average reviews," based on 11 reviews.

Entertainment Weekly critic Nick Catucci wrote: "Like a mellowing dude who finally trims off his frosted tips, the Backstreet Boys adopt a streamlined — dare we say mature — sound on their eighth album [...] and they still bring some of that old campy sparkle." Stephen Thomas Erlewine of AllMusic found it "far more interesting" sonically than the two last albums and stated that In a World Like This was a "surprisingly mature and fine record from a former boy band that seems unafraid to act its age." PopMatters's Kevin Catchpole stated that "this album won't set the world on fire like Millennium did [but] for what they've become, it is definitely a step in the right direction." Writing for The Standard, John Aizlewood found that the album was "less strident than the previous seven [...] and is as efficient and clinical as globe-straddling pop ought to be. Superb, often spine-tingling harmonies — always Backstreet [...] It's predictable but it's no less rewarding, and no less expertly crafted for all that." Los Angeles Times's August Brown wrote: "Is anything here going to be as iconic in their catalog as "Everybody"? Probably not. But there are far worse records than this to greet you at the pearly gates," while Boston Globe critic Sarah Rodman remarked that although "there are a couple of detours [...] the fivesome remains genial, accessible, and happy in lush harmony."

In a mixed review, Caroline Sullivan of The Guardian opined that "their last record, released 2009, recreated the dance-pop of their golden era; this time, perhaps goaded by fear of looking foolish, they've abandoned the beats for mid-tempo adult pop." Annie Zaleski from The A.V. Club remarked that "as with the last few records, this release freshens up the group’s soulful sound with modern production touches and reference points [...] The problem is, these contemporary sonic elements don't suit the Backstreet Boys' strengthsin fact, the album's slick production makes the vocal melodies and harmonies sound disappointingly generic." Newsday critic Glenn Gamboa wrote that "at their best, the Backstreet Boys build the sweetest pop of any boy band around. And on In a World Like This [...] they continue the tradition [...] Unfortunately, there are too many poorly worded choruses and too much greeting-card sap to take the whole project seriously. Julia Leconte from Now found that with In a World Like This the band was stepping "into a blandish adult contemporary milieu [...] Max Martin wrote the opening track on each of those early records, as he does here on their eighth. But even the anthemic title tune can’t hoist the group out of elevator-music territory." Rolling Stone critic Caryn Ganz noted: "Given that they're out of the spotlight, they could've tried anything here, but settled for dentist-office-dull tracks stocked with wanna-be Ryan Tedder beats [..] The resulting LP is roughly 100 times less fun than the Boys' cameo in This Is the End." Hermione Hoby, writing for The Observer, concluded: "The music is just as you'd expect: uplifting cheese."

== Commercial performance ==
First released in Japan on July 24, 2013, In a World Like This opened at number one on the Oricon Albums Chart, selling 40,000 copies in its first week and becoming the best-selling western album in Japan at that time. The album was eventually certified Gold by the Recording Industry Association of Japan (RIAJ), with total sales of 109,077 units. While this considered a strong performance, it was a noticeable decline from their previous album, This Is Us, which debuted at number two with 98,000 copies sold.

On July 30, 2013, the album was released in the United States. It debuted and peaked at number five on the US Billboard 200 the week of August 17, 2013, selling 48,000 copies in its first week. It was the group’s highest-charting US release since Never Gone in 2005. On other Billboard charts, In a World Like This reached number three on the Independent Albums chart and number seven on the Digital Albums chart. In total, the album sold 180,100 copies in the United States, though it did not receive a certification.

In most other countries, the album was released in August 2013 . It reached number one in the Netherlands, India, Switzerland, and Taiwan (on both the Five Music and G-Music charts). In Canada, it peaked at number two, continuing the group's streak of high-charting releases. In a World Like This also entered the top five in Germany, Spain, and on the UK Independent Albums chart, and the top ten in Austria and Norway. In China, the album reached number three on the Sino Chart in December 2013. In March 2014, it was released in France and entered French SNEP Albums Chart at number 144.

== Track listing ==
The official track listing was posted on the group's site on June 17, 2013.

In a World Like This track listing
No.	Title	Writer(s)	Producer(s)	Length
1.	"In a World Like This"	Max Martin; Kristian Lundin; Savan Kotecha	Martin; Lundin	3:40
2.	"Permanent Stain"	Morgan Taylor Reid; Mika Guillory; Nick Carter	Reid	3:58
3.	"Breathe"	Martin Terefe; Nick Whitecross; Magne Furuholmen; Andreas Olsson; AJ McLean; Brian Littrell; Howie Dorough	Terefe; Olsson^{[a]}	3:51
4.	"Madeleine"	Terefe; Sacha Skarbek	Terefe	4:05
5.	"Show 'Em (What You're Made Of)"	Reid; Guillory; McLean; Kevin Richardson	Reid	3:45
6.	"Make Believe"	Dan Muckala; Carter; Richardson; Howie Dorough; Bryan Shackle	Muckala	4:47
7.	"Try"	Terefe; James Bryan; James Morrison; Kyle Riabko	Terefe; Bryan^{[a]}	3:23
8.	"Trust Me"	Terefe; Bryan; Justin Nozuka	Terefe	3:47
9.	"Love Somebody"	Justin Trugman; Jaakko Manninen; Jordan Omley; Carter; Dorough	Trugman; Manninen; Omley^{[b]}	3:25
10.	"One Phone Call"	Reid; Dorough; Sean Douglas	Reid	3:51
11.	"Feels Like Home"	Muckala; Carter; Dorough; Richardson; Shackle	Muckala	3:26
12.	"Soldier"	Reid; Guillory; Carter; Dorough	Reid	3:54

iTunes Store bonus track
No.	Title	Writer(s)	Producer(s)	Length
13.	"Hot, Hot, Hot"	Terefe; Glen Scott; Dorough; Littrell; Carter	Terefe	3:26

Japanese edition bonus track
No.	Title	Writer(s)	Producer(s)	Length
13.	"Light On"	Muckala; Carter; Richardson; Jess Cates	Muckala	4:05

Hong Kong, Taiwan, China, Mexico and Target special edition bonus tracks
No.	Title	Writer(s)	Producer(s)	Length
13.	"In Your Arms"	Reid; Guillory; Carter; Dorough	Reid	3:46
14.	"Take Care"	Terefe; Lowell Boland; Glen Scott; Dorough; Littrell	Terefe; Scott	3:26

Deluxe World Tour Edition bonus tracks
No.	Title	Notes	Length
13.	"In a World Like This (Live in Japan)"	Audio
14.	"Show 'Em (What You're Made Of) (Live in Japan)"	Audio
15.	"Show Me the Meaning of Being Lonely (Live in Japan)"	Audio
16.	"Love Somebody (Live in Japan)"	Audio
17.	"The One (Live in Japan)"	Audio
18.	"Breathe (Live in Japan)"	Audio

iTunes Store Deluxe World Tour Edition bonus contents
No.	Title	Notes	Length
13.	"Hot, Hot, Hot"	Audio
14.	"In a World Like This (Live in Japan)"	Audio
15.	"Show 'Em (What You're Made Of) (Live in Japan)"	Audio
16.	"Show Me the Meaning of Being Lonely (Live in Japan)"	Audio
17.	"Love Somebody (Live in Japan)"	Audio
18.	"The One (Live in Japan)"	Audio
19.	"Breathe (Live in Japan)"	Audio
20.	"Permanent Stain (Live in China)"	Video
21.	"Madeleine (Live in China)"	Video

Notes

- ^{^[a]} signifies an additional producer
- ^{^[b]} signifies a vocal producer

== Credits ==
Credits adapted from the album’s liner notes. The track numbers correspond to the special editions of Hong Kong, Taiwan, China, Mexico, and Target.

Backstreet Boys

- Nick Carter
- Howie Dorough
- Brian Littrell
- AJ McLean
- Kevin Richardson

Additional personnel

- Nathaniel Alford - assistant engineer (tracks 6, 11)
- David Angell - violin (track 3)
- Cory Bice - assistant engineer (track 1)
- James Bryan - additional production, engineer, acoustic guitar, and programming (track 7)
- Jon Castelli - mixing (tracks 2–14)
- Fernando Castillo - trumpet (track 8)
- John Catchings - cello (track 3)
- Adam Cole - engineer (track 3), assistant engineer (track 8)
- Tom Coyne - mastering
- David Davidson - violin and string arrangements (track 3)
- Brian Frederick - assistant engineer (tracks 6, 11)
- Serban Ghenea - mixing (track 1)
- Franny Graham - engineer (track 9)
- Grooveline Horns - horns and horns engineers (track 8)
- John Hanes - mix engineer (track 1)
- Sam Holland - engineer (track 1)
- Jordan Keller - additional background vocals (track 11)
- Sam Keyte - engineer (tracks 3, 4, 7, 8), programming (tracks 3, 8)
- Adam Lester - electric and acoustic guitars (tracks 6, 11)
- Tomas Ljung - handclaps (track 1)
- Kristian Lundin - producer, keyboards, and programming (track 1)
- Jaakko Manninen - producer, instruments, and programming (track 9)
- Max Martin - producer, guitar, bass, keyboards, programming, and additional background vocals (track 1)
- Tony Maserati - mixing (tracks 2–14)
- Dan Muckala - producer, engineer, keyboards, and arranging (tracks 6, 11); additional background vocals (track 11)
- Ryan Nasci - assistant mix engineer (tracks 2–14)
- Andreas Olsson - programming (tracks 3, 8), synthesizers and additional production (track 3)
- Jordan Omley - vocal production (track 9)
- Morgan Taylor Reid - producer, engineer, instruments, and programming (tracks 2, 5, 10, 12, 13)
- Tim Roberts - assistant mix engineer (track 1)
- Glen Scott - piano (tracks 3, 4, 8, 14); programming (tracks 3, 4, 14); engineer and synthesizers (tracks 4, 14); organ (track 3); Wurlitzer (track 4); producer, drums, and bass (track 14)
- Bryan Shackle - additional background vocals (track 11)
- Baeho "Bobby" Shin - strings engineer (track 3)
- Kris Sonne - drums (tracks 3, 8), percussion (track 4), programming (track 3)
- Carlos Sosa - saxophone (track 8)
- Martin Terefe - producer (tracks 3, 4, 7, 8, 14), bass (tracks 3, 7, 8), acoustic guitar (tracks 3, 4, 8), percussion (track 8), additional programming (track 14)
- Nikolaj Torp - Hammond Organ and Wurlitzer (track 7)
- Justin Trugman - producer, instruments, and programming (track 9)
- Reggie Watkins - trombone (track 8)
- Clinton Welander - additional engineering (tracks 3, 14)
- Kristin Wilkinson - viola (track 3)

== Charts ==
=== Weekly charts ===
Weekly chart performance for In a World Like This
Chart (2013–14)	Peak position
Australian Albums (ARIA)	30
Austrian Albums (Ö3 Austria)	8
Belgian Albums (Ultratop Flanders)	17
Belgian Albums (Ultratop Wallonia)	37
Canadian Albums (Billboard)	2
Chinese Albums (Sino-Chart)	3
Croatian Albums (IFPI)	32
Danish Albums (Hitlisten)	23
Dutch Albums (Album Top 100)	1
Finnish Albums (Suomen virallinen lista)	14
French Albums (SNEP)	144
German Albums (Offizielle Top 100)	3
Indian Albums (IMI)	1
Irish Albums (IRMA)	81
Italian Albums (FIMI)	24
Italian Albums (Musica e Dischi)	32
Japanese Albums (Oricon)	4
Korean Albums (Gaon Weekly Charts)	6
Norwegian Albums (VG-lista)	8
Scottish Albums (Official Charts)	19
Spanish Albums (Promusicae)	5
Swedish Albums (Sverigetopplistan)	25
Swiss Albums (Schweizer Hitparade)	1
Taiwanese Albums (Five Music)	1
Taiwanese Albums (G-Music)	1
UK Albums (OCC)	16
UK Independent Albums (Official Charts)	2
US Billboard 200	5
US Digital Albums (Billboard)	7
US Independent Albums (Billboard)	3

=== Year-end charts ===
Year-end chart performance for In a World Like This
Chart (2013)	Peak position
Italian Albums (FIMI)	99
Japanese Albums (Oricon)	57
South Korean Albums (Gaon)	67
Spanish Albums (PROMUSICAE)	48
US Independent Albums (Billboard)	33

== Certifications ==
Certifications for In a World Like This
Region	Certification	Certified units/sales
Japan (RIAJ)	Gold	109,077
United States	—	180,100

== Release history ==
In a World Like This release history
Country	Date	Edition(s)	Label
Japan	July 24, 2013	CD, digital download	K-BAHN, RCA Records
United Kingdom	July 29, 2013	CD, digital download	K-BAHN, BMG Rights Management
United States	July 30, 2013	CD, digital download	K-BAHN, BMG Rights Management
Australia	August 2, 2013	Digital download	Cooking Vinyl
Australia	August 9, 2013	CD	Cooking Vinyl
Germany	August 2, 2013	CD, digital download	K-BAHN, BMG Rights Management
South Africa	August 2, 2013	Digital download	Just Music
South Africa	August 23, 2013	CD	Just Music
Hong Kong	August 9, 2013	CD, digital download	Love Da Records
Taiwan	August 9, 2013	CD, digital download	Love Da Records
Singapore	August 9, 2013	CD, digital download	Love Da Records
Malaysia	August 9, 2013	CD, digital download	Love Da Records
Korea	August 12, 2013	Digital download	Sony Music Korea
Korea	August 22, 2013	CD	Sony Music Korea
Mexico	August 15, 2013	CD, digital download	Sony Music Entertainment
Russia	August 26, 2013	CD, digital download	Gala Records, Warner Music
China	December 15, 2013	CD	Guangdong Starsing Records, Sony Music China
France	March 14, 2014	CD, digital download	
