= Aware (album) =

Studio album by Salvador
- Released: April 29, 2008
- Genre: Christian music, christian rock, contemporary R&B, funk, gospel
- Length: 43:10
- Label: Word
- Producer: Nic Gonzales, Chris Bevins, Otto Price

Salvador chronology
Dismiss the Mystery (2006)	Aware (2008)	Make Some Noise (2013)

Professional ratings
Review scores
Source	Rating
allMusic	4/5 stars
Jesus Freak Hideout	3.5/5 stars
New Release Today	5/5 stars

Aware is the eighth album released by Salvador. It was released on April 29, 2008 through Word.

== Critical reception ==
The album has received positive reviews. Lizza Connor Bowen of New Release Today stated that "...The smart lyrics mix keen observation and genuine, vertical praise. On Aware, Salvador continues to answer the aforementioned question with one consistent answer: Jesus." Jesus Freak Hideout stated "Salvador doesn't exactly try anything new on Aware, but the guys do continue to perfect what they know all too well and that's making music that pleases..."

== Track listing ==
No.	Title	Writer(s)	Length
1.	"Fly Again"	Nic Gonzales, Sam Mizell	4:55
2.	"What Would It Be Like"	Mizell, Jeff Pardo	3:23
3.	"Aware"	Gonzales	4:09
4.	"Everybody Needs You"	Gonzales	4:08
5.	"Llevame"	Alex Cuba, Jaci Velasquez	3:11
6.	"Undeniable"	Chris Bevins, Gonzales, Mike Payne	3:36
7.	"You Rescue Me"	Gonzales, Douglas Kaine McKelvey	3:45
8.	"Who You Really Are"	Gonzales	3:48
9.	"Free To Be"	Don Chaffer, Lori Chaffer, Gonzales	3:55
10.	"Here I Am"	Rick Cua, Gonzales	3:44
11.	"Brand New Love"	Bevins, Gonzales, McKelvey	3:52
Total length:			43:10

== Personnel ==
Salvador

- Nic Gonzales – lead vocals, acoustic guitars, electric guitars
- Chris Bevins – keyboards, programming, backing vocals, horn arrangements
- Josh Gonzales – bass, backing vocals
- Ben Cordonero – drums
- Alejandro Santoyo – percussion
- Craig Swift – flute, alto saxophone, tenor saxophone
- Leif Shires – trumpet, flugelhorn

Additional musicians

- Otto Price – keyboards, synthesizers, programming, guitars, bass, backing vocals
- Chris Carmichael – strings, string arrangements
- Jaci Velasquez – lead and backing vocals (4)

== Production ==
- Otto Price – A&R direction, executive producer, producer
- Nic Gonzales – producer
- Chris Bevins – co-producer, engineer
- Jerry Guidroz – assistant engineer
- Bryan Lenox – mixing
- Richard Dodd – mastering
- Katherine Petillo – creative director
- Ray Roper – design
- Allan Clarke – photography
- Samantha Roe – hair stylist, make-up, wardrobe stylist

== Chart performance ==
Chart (2008)	Peak position
US Billboard Top Christian Albums	38
