= Niña de Fuego =

Studio album by Concha Buika
- Released: January 2, 2008
- Genre: Flamenco, pop
- Label: Casa Limón 2564695451; DRO Atlantic 2564695451
- Producer: Javier Limón

Concha Buika chronology
Mi Niña Lola (2006)	Niña de Fuego (2008)	El Último Trago (2009)

Professional ratings
Review scores
Source	Rating
Allmusic	4/5 stars

Niña de Fuego is the third studio album by Spanish singer Concha Buika. It was nominated for the Latin Grammy Award for Album of the Year. The record was released on January 2, 2008 via Casa Limón and DRO Atlantic labels.

== Overview ==
La Nina de Fuego is a collection of flamenco songs and also Spanish and Mexican folk ballads. The texts are about women facing loneliness, infidelity, and falling in love with the wrong man.

Buika's singing is accompanied by Javier Limón's guitar and the piano playing of Ivan Lewis.

== Track listing ==
No.	Title	Writer(s)	Length
1.	"La Falsa Moneda"	Juan Mostazo	3:33
2.	"Culpa Mía"		4:11
3.	"Miénteme Bien"		5:52
4.	"La Niña De Fuego"	Manolo Caracol	3:39
5.	"Árboles De Agua"		4:34
6.	"La Niebla"	David Trueba	4:00
7.	"No Habrá Nadie En El Mundo"		3:52
8.	"Volver, Volver"		4:24
9.	"Volverás"		6:51
10.	"Mentirosa"		4:49
11.	"Hay En La Luz"		3:45

== Personnel ==
- Manolo Caracol – composer
- Óscar Clavel – mixing
- Horacio "El Negro" Hernández – bateria, drum
- Ivan "Melon" Lewis – piano
- "Dizzy" Daniel Moorehead – saxophone (track 3)
- Javier Limón – arranger, dirigida, flamenco guitar, liner notes
- Salomé Limón – executive producer, recording
- Juan Mostazo – composer
- Melisa Nanni – recording
- Ramón Porrina – percussion
- Carlitos Sarduy – trumpet
- Alan Silverman – mastering
- David Trueba – composer

== Review ==
With Niña de Fuego, again produced by Limón, Buika delves deeper into the flamenco genre but continues to cast a much wider net. Here she sings both her originals and reinterprets classic rancheras. She has branded her sound with a warm jazz-oriented approach, encompassing each song with its own distinct character. She sings with minimal accompaniment, creating spaces in the songs that add to the attraction. Though all the lyrics on Niña de Fuego are in Spanish, there is a feeling that transcends language barriers. The songs are sung in the universal tones of a forsaken, abandoned or distraught lover seeking consolation in the song. This is the traditional formula for Spanish composition of all genres; it is music with very deep roots in romance expressed as art. Niña de Fuego maintains its true bearing throughout. It offers an excellent mix of tempos, great song selection, and superb production quality. Buika does not wander aimlessly, but travels to that space where she excels in pouring out her emotions, leaving behind secret hopes for more to come.

—All About Jazz
