= Novedades de México =

Newspaper published in Mexico City

Novedades de México is a newspaper published in Mexico City. The newspaper was founded by Rómulo O'Farril, and its ownership remains in his family.

The newspaper published an English language sister paper called The News until 2002.

Rosario Sansores Prén, Lolo de la Torriente, and others have written articles for this newspaper.

== See also ==
- List of Mexican newspapers
