= Mi Niña Lola =

Studio album by Concha Buika
- Released: April 3, 2006
- Genre: Flamenco, pop
- Length: 46:30
- Label: DRO Atlantic 0825646327423
- Producer: Javier Limón

Concha Buika chronology
Buika (2005)	Mi Niña Lola (2006)	Niña de Fuego (2008)

Professional ratings
Review scores
Source	Rating
Allmusic	3.5/5 stars

Mi Niña Lola (My Child Lola) is the second studio album by Spanish singer Concha Buika. The record was released on April 3, 2006 via DRO Atlantic label.

== Reception ==
The album sold 80,000 copies in Spain and sold well in neighboring France too. Mi Niña Lola won many awards (including best produced album at the 2007 Premios de la Música, the Spanish Grammys) and international acclaim. Buika toured widely as a result. The album reached No. 11 on the Spanish albums chart.

== Track listing ==
No.	Title	Length
1.	"Mi Niña Lola"	4:29
2.	"Ojos Verdes"	5:27
3.	"Te Camelo"	3:54
4.	"Ay De Mi Primavera"	4:26
5.	"A Mi Manera"	5:27
6.	"Nostalgias"	4:09
7.	"Triunfo"	3:08
8.	"Bulería Alegre"	3:38
9.	"Love"	2:35
10.	"Loca"	3:36
11.	"Jodida Pero Contenta"	5:44
Total length:		46:30

== Personnel ==
- Acoustic Guitar [Flamenco Guitar] – Niño Josele
- Backing Vocals, Handclaps [Palmas] – Barriga Blanca, El General
- Bass – Alain Pérez (tracks: 1 to 5, 7 to 11)
- Drums – Horacio "El Negro" Hernandez
- Executive producer – Azules Y Moraos
- Lead vocals, backing vocals – Buika
- Mastered by – Alan Silverman
- Mixed by – Pepe Loeches
- Percussion, Backing Vocals, Handclaps [Palmas] – Ramón Porrina
- Piano – José Reinoso (tracks: 1 to 4, 6 to 8, 10, 11)
- Producer – Javier Limón
- Recorded by – Salomé Limon
- Strings – Manuel Martínez (2), Pere Bardagí
- Trumpet – Jerry González
- Vocals [Voz Flamenca Invitada] – Montse Cortés
