= Vivir Sin Miedo =

Studio album by Concha Buika
- Released: 16 October 2015
- Studio: DRAX Studios, Madrid; Flux Studios, NY; Kensaltown Recording Studios, London; MiamAfrican Sound, Miami Beach
- Genre: Pop, jazz, latin
- Length: 47:23
- Label: DRO 256460705; EastWest 256460704
- Producer: Concha Buika, Martin Terefe

Concha Buika chronology
La Noche Más Larga (2013)	Vivir Sin Miedo (2015)	Para mí (2017)

Vivir Sin Miedo (To Live Without Fear) is the sixth studio album by Spanish singer Concha Buika. The record was released on 16 October 2015 via DRO Records and EastWest labels.

== Track listing ==
No.	Title	Length
1.	"Vivir Sin Miedo"	4:47
2.	"Si Volveré"	5:20
3.	"Carry Your Own Weight (featuring Jason Mraz)"	4:11
4.	"Mucho Dinero"	3:01
5.	"Waves"	4:15
6.	"Good Men"	4:06
7.	"Cidade Do Amor"	4:06
8.	"Yo Iré"	4:43
9.	"The Key (Misery)"	8:29
10.	"Sister"	4:24
Total length:		47:23

== Personnel ==
Adapted from AllMusic.com

- Buika - Bass, Drum Programming, Guitar, Keyboards, Primary Artist, Producer, Programming, Vocals
- Martin Terefe - Bass, Double Bass, Guitar (Acoustic), Guitar (Electric), Producer, Ukulele, Vocals (Background)
- Oscar Winberg - Engineer, Guitar (Electric), Juno, Mellotron, Programming, Vocals (Background)
- Glen Scott - Drums, Fender Rhodes, Organ, Percussion, Piano, Programming, Synthesizer, Synthesizer Bass, Vocals (Background), Wurlitzer
- Kristoffer Sonne - Drums
- Jason Mraz - Featured Artist, Vocals
- Carlos Sosa - Saxophone
- Raul Vallego - Trombone
- Paul Armstrong - Trumpet
- Andre de Lange - Vocals (Background)
- Josué Rodriguez Fernandez - Bass
- Fetsum Sebhat - Vocals (Background)
- Fred Man - Vocals (Background)
- Jordana Mba - Vocals (Background)
- "Dizzy" Daniel Moorehead - Alto Sax
- Nana Clara Aldrin-Quaye - Vocals (Background)
- Piraña Porrina - Percussion
- Ramón Porrina - Percussion
- Sabú Porrina -Percussion
- Meshell Ndegeocello - Bass
- Eduardo De La Paz - Mix engineer
- Geoff Pesche - Mastering engineer
- Javi Rojo - Photography
