= So Natural (Salvador album) =

Studio album by Salvador
- Released: November 9, 2004
- Genre: Christian rock, contemporary Christian music, Latin rock
- Length: 46:37
- Label: Word
- Producer: Chris Rodriguez, Nic Gonzales, Chris Bevins

Salvador chronology
Con Poder (2003)	So Natural (2004)	Que Tan Lejos Esta Cielo (2005)

Professional ratings
Review scores
Source	Rating
Jesus Freak Hideout	3.5/5 stars
SoulShine	5/5 stars

So Natural is the fourth studio album released by the Christian rock band, Salvador.

The single "Heaven" off the release ranked number No. 2 on Billboard's Hot Christian Songs. The song "You Are There" also reached No. 27 on the same chart.

== Track listing ==
No.	Title	Writer(s)	Length
1.	"Can You Feel (The Supernatural)"	Nic Gonzales, S. L. Brown, Chuck Butler, Joel Cavazos	3:42
2.	"You Are There"	Gonzales, Chad Cates, Chris Rodriguez	3:17
3.	"This Is My Life"	Gonzales, Chris Bevins, Jason Ingram	4:49
4.	"Heaven" (originally performed by Los Lonely Boys)	Henry Garza, Joey Garza, Ringo Garza	3:50
5.	"It Comes Back To You"	Gonzales, Cindy Morgan, Dan Muckala	4:47
6.	"Cover Me"	Gonzales, Nick Trevisick	3:32
7.	"For More Than Ourselves"	Gonzales, Brown, Butler	3:52
8.	"Fabricated"	Gonzales, Rick Cua	3:36
9.	"Let It Be Said"	Gonzales, Ingram, Ben Kolarcik	3:57
10.	"Glimpse Of His Heart"	Gonzales, Trevisick, Danny Wilde	3:36
11.	"So Natural"	Gonzales, Jamie Kinney, Javier Solis	4:03
12.	"La Palabra" (Live)	Carlos Sosa, Carmeio Torres, Christian Fernández, Gonzales	3:36
Total length:			46:37

- "La Palabra" is sung completely in Spanish.

== Personnel ==
Salvador

- Nic Gonzales – lead vocals, guitars, horn arrangements
- Chris Bevins – keyboards, horn arrangements, string arrangements
- Joel Cavazos – guitars, backing vocals
- Josh Gonzales – bass
- Robert Acuña – drums
- Esteban "Chamo" Lopez – percussion
- Jared Solis – alto saxophone, tenor saxophone, trombone, horn arrangements
- Pablo Gabaldon – trumpet, flugelhorn, horn arrangements

Additional musicians

- Chris Rodriguez – guitars, backing vocals, horn arrangements
- Andrea Springall – strings

== Production ==
- Nic Gonzales – producer
- Chris Rodriguez – producer (1–4, 6–12), A&R direction
- Shane D. Wilson – engineer (1–4, 6–12), mixing (1–11)
- Chris Bevins – additional recording (1–4, 6–12), overdub recording (1–4, 6–12), producer (5), engineer (5), mixing (12)
- Boo MacLeod – engineer (5)
- Rob Clark – assistant engineer (1–4, 6–12)
- Jeff Hamilton – assistant engineer (5)
- Chris Henning – additional Pro Tools editing
- Tom Coyne – mastering (1–4, 6–12)
- Eric Conn – mastering (5)
- Donn Cobb – mastering (5)
- Shawn McSpadden – A&R direction
- Cheryl H. McTyre – A&R administration
- Mark Lusk – artist development
- Katherine Petillo – creative direction
- Louis LaPrad – art direction, design
- Blair Berle – senior creative administrator
- Thomas Petillo – photographer
- Lucy Santamassino – grooming, hair stylist
- Karie Perkins – wardrobe stylist
- Michael Smith & Associates – management

Studios

Tracks 1–4 & 6–12

- Recorded at Masterlink Studio (Nashville, Tennessee).
- Additional recording at Warehouse Christian Ministries (Sacramento, California).
- Overdubs recorded at Working Man's Studio (Franklin, Tennessee).
- Mixed at Pentavarit (Nashville, Tennessee).
- Track 12 mixed at Working Man's Studio.
- Mastered at Sterling Sound (New York City, New York).

Track 5

- Recorded at Pedernales Recording Studio (Austin, Texas).
- Mixed at Pentavarit (Nashville, Tennessee).
- Mastered at Independent Mastering (Nashville, Tennessee).

== Chart performance ==
Chart (2004)	Peak positions
U.S. Billboard Heatseekers Albums	40
U.S. Billboard Christian Albums	26
