= Salvador (Salvador album) =

Studio album by Salvador
- Released: June 20, 2000
- Genres: Latin music, Funk, Contemporary Christian, Gospel
- Length: 43:01
- Label: Word
- Producers: Monroe Jones; Dan Posthuma

Salvador chronology
| Salvador (2000) | Into Motion (2002) |

Professional ratings
Review scores
| Source | Rating |
|---|---|
| Allmusic | 4/5 stars |

Salvador is the self-titled debut studio album released by the Christian band Salvador in 2000.

== Track listing ==
| No. | Title | Writer(s) | Length |
|---|---|---|---|
| 1. | "Lord, I Come Before You" | Nick Gonzales; Arturo Gonzales; Matthew West | 4:41 |
| 2. | "David Danced" | Author Anonymous | 3:01 |
| 3. | "Crucified" | David Mullen; Pete Kipley | 3:40 |
| 4. | "Ain't It Good" | David Mullen; Nick Gonzales; Arturo Gonzales; Monroe Jones; Dan Posthuma | 4:59 |
| 5. | "Montaña" | Traditional | 3:52 |
| 6. | "Cry Holy" | Marshall Hall; Benjy Gaither | 3:51 |
| 7. | "Halleluja" | Monroe Jones; Marshall Hall; Benjy Gaither | 3:12 |
| 8. | "Now It Moves" | Traditional | 3:02 |
| 9. | "Alabar Al Seño" | Billy Sprague; Nick Gonzales; Arturo Gonzales | 4:01 |
| 10. | "Healing" | Rick Cua; Tony Hooper | 4:35 |
| 11. | "With God" | Matthew West; Nick Gonzales; Arturo Gonzales; Josh Gonzales | 4:07 |
| Total length: | | | 43:01 |

== Personnel ==
=== Salvador ===
- Nick Gonzales – lead vocals, guitars
- Adrian Lopez – keyboards, vocals
- Josh Gonzales – bass, vocals
- Art Gonzales – drums
- Eliot Torres – percussion, vocals

=== Additional musicians ===
- Jeffery Roach – keyboards
- George Cocchini – electric guitar, gut-string guitar
- Sam Levine – saxophones
- Barry Green – trombone
- Mike Haynes – trumpet
- Steve Patrick – trumpet
- Michael Mellett – backing vocals
- Chris Rodriguez – backing vocals
- First Church ECI (Municie, Indiana) – choir
- Clint Dunn – choir director
- Bob Clark, Lisa Dunn, Jeni Friedersdorf, Benji Gaither, Dan Jeffers, Laura Ontjes, Mariano Rodriguez de Ledesma, Christina Smith, Holly Smith, Marj Smith and Cami Wyatt – additional choir, backing vocals

== Production ==
- Monroe Jones – producer
- Dan Posthuma – producer, executive producer
- Jim Dineen – recording
- Mark Linger – recording
- David Schober – recording
- Shane D. Wilson – recording, mixing
- Tera Wilson – recording assistant
- Nathan Zwalt – recording assistant
- J.C. Monterrosa – mix assistant
- Stephen Marcussen – mastering
- Jamie Kiner – A&R coordinator
- Beth Lee – art direction
- Louis LaPrad – design
- Tony Baker – photography
- Chad Curry – wardrobe stylist
- Bridget Cook – grooming
- Michael Smith & Associates – management

Studios

- Recorded at The Spank Factory, Screaming Baby and Criminal Recording (Franklin, Tennessee); White House Studios (Leicester, UK).
- Mixed at The Sound Kitchen (Franklin, Tennessee).
- Mastered at Marcussen Mastering (Hollywood, California).
