= Rosario Sansores =

Mexican poet and journalist (1889–1972)

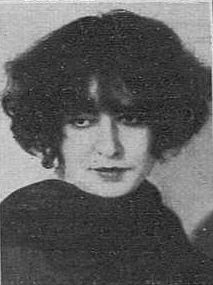
- in The literary year, 1927
- Born: Rosario Sansores Prén; 25 August 1889; Mérida, Yucatán
- Died: 7 January 1972 (aged 82); México City
- Occupations: Poet, journalist
- Spouse: Antonio Sangenis

Rosario Sansores Prén (25 August 1889 – 7 January 1972) was a Mexican poet and journalist, known for works such as "Cuando tú te hayas ido" ("When You Have Gone"), a poem that served as the basis for the pasillo-style song "Sombras" ("Shadows"), by Ecuadorian composer Carlos Brito.

== Biography ==
She was born in a well-off family, the daughter of Juan Ignacio Sansores Escalante and Laura Prén Cámara, who tried to dissuade her from writing poetry at a young age. At the age of fourteen she married Cuban Antonio Sangenis and moved to Havana, where she lived for 23 years. During the time that she dwelled in Cuba, she dedicated herself to writing articles on social issues in newspapers and magazines. In 1911 she began to publish books of her poetry, most of them signed with pseudonyms.

In 1918, when Rosario Sansores was 29 years old, her husband died. She subsequently published works of poetry such as Mientras se va la vida (While Life Is Going) (1925) and Rutas de emoción (Routes of Emotion) (1954). Sansores declared herself contrary to modern trends in poetry (from the mid-20th century), and she declared herself corny:

Yes, yes, people say I am cheesy. Imagine if I am not going to know. But I don't care. On the contrary, it flatters me. People who know I am cheesy show they have read me, and that's all that matters. (Sí, sí, la gente dice que soy cursi. Imagínate si no voy a saberlo. Pero no me preocupa. Al contrario, me halaga. La gente que sabe que soy cursi demuestra que me ha leído, y eso es lo único que importa.)

She returned to Mexico in 1932 along with her two daughters, and specifically to the capital city, where she was a columnist in the social section of the newspapers Hoy (Today) and Novedades. In 1933 she published the collection of poems La novia del sol (The Bride of the Sun), which included 104 poems, among which she highlighted "When You Have Gone". Years later the poem was read by Ecuadorian composer Carlos Brito Benavides, who set the lyrics to music in order to create the song "Sombras" ("Shadows").

Despite the fact that her poems served as the basis for the creation of numerous songs in South America—especially in Ecuador and Colombia—Rosario Sansores visited those lands on very few occasions. In fact, she was only in Ecuador once, in 1967, when she was the guest of honor of the Guayaquil Association of Journalists, received a literary award, and was declared a gold poet by President Otto Arosemena. In Spain, composer Enrique Belenguer Estela set the poem "Nostalgia" to music, composing a song for tenor and piano.

=== Death ===
She died in Mexico City, on 7 January 1972, when she was 82 years old.

== Books ==
- Del país del ensueño, (From Dreamland) (1911)
- Las horas pasan, (The Hours Go By) (1921)
- Mientras se va la vida, (While Life Is Going) (1925)
- Cantaba el mar azul, (Sang the Blue Sea) (1927)
- La novia del sol, (The Bride of the Sun) (1933)
- Mi corazón y yo, (My Heart and I) (1943)
- Fruta madura, (Ripe Fruit) (1945)
- Sombra en el agua, (Shadow in the Water) (1951)
- Polvo de olvido, (Dust of Oblivion) (1951)
