= Show 'Em (What You're Made Of) =

Single by Backstreet Boys

from the album In a World Like This
- Released: November 18, 2013
- Recorded: 2012–2013
- Studio: MTR Studios, Hollywood, California; Chalice Recording Studios, Hollywood, California
- Genre: Pop
- Length: 3:44
- Label: BMG; K-BAHN
- Songwriters: Morgan Taylor Reid; Mika Guillory; AJ McLean; Kevin Richardson
- Producer: Morgan Taylor Reid

Backstreet Boys singles chronology
"In a World Like This" (2013)	"Show 'Em (What You're Made Of)" (2013)	"God, Your Mama, and Me" (2017)

Promo cover

Music video
- "Show 'Em (What You're Made Of)" on YouTube

"Show 'Em (What You're Made Of)" is a song by American pop group Backstreet Boys from their eighth studio album In a World Like This (2013). It was released as the second single from the album on November 18, 2013. The song was written by Morgan Taylor Reid, Mika Guillory, and Backstreet Boys members AJ McLean and Kevin Richardson and produced by Reid.

It is also the theme song of the documentary film Backstreet Boys: Show 'Em What You're Made Of, and was featured in the German movie Sapphire Blue soundtrack.

== Background and recording ==
My dad, right before I was getting ready to go to football practice, he would say, ‘Show ‘em what you’re made of, bud!’ That’s kind of how that song got inspired. Another inspiration for A.J. and I writing this song was our children. The innocence and wonder in their eyes is so precious. I want them to keep it forever and I want to rediscover it within myself. No limits, no fear.

— Kevin Richardson

Richardson got the inspiration for the title of the song from his late father's words. The song was co-written by bandmate AJ McLean and is meant to be a pep talk for their children, and also as a positive reinforcement for the world in general. "This is as a positive reinforcement-type song because there’s so much negativity out there. The world needs positivity! The song turned out beyond what we ever expected. It became this huge emotional record," McLean said.

== Music video ==
A music video for the song, directed by Jon Vulpine, was filmed in Miami, Florida. It was premiered on the group's official Facebook page and then released on Vevo a day later.

The video takes on a minimalistic approach, showing individual shots of each band member against a black background. AJ McLean and Brian Littrell appear shirtless, coinciding with the song's message. Littrell had an open heart surgery in 1998 to correct a birth defect and hadn't been seen shirtless publicly ever since. McLean is shirtless to show a tattoo he got in honor of his wife and daughter.

== Track listing ==
- Digital download
1. "Show 'Em (What You're Made Of)" – 3:44
- UK Promo CD single
1. "Show 'Em (What You're Made Of) (Ash Howes Radio Mix)" – 3:44
2. "Show 'Em (What You're Made Of) (Album Version)" – 3:47
3. "Show 'Em (What You're Made Of) (Morgan Taylor Reid Mix)" – 3:41

== Charts ==
Chart (2014)	Peak position
Netherlands (Dutch Top 40 Tipparade)	17

== Release history ==
Country	Date	Format	Label
Netherlands	November 18, 2013	Digital Download	BMG Rights Management; K-BAHN
Austria	November 22, 2013	Digital Download	BMG Rights Management; K-BAHN
Germany	November 22, 2013	Digital Download	BMG Rights Management; K-BAHN
Switzerland	November 22, 2013	Digital Download	BMG Rights Management; K-BAHN
Ireland	December 15, 2013	Digital Download	BMG Rights Management; K-BAHN
United Kingdom	December 15, 2013	Digital Download	BMG Rights Management; K-BAHN
