= Dumpstaphunk =

American funk and jam band

- Also known as: Ivan's Neville Dumpstaphunk
- Origin: New Orleans, Louisiana, U.S.
- Genres: Funk, jazz, soul, blues, gospel, rock, jam band
- Years active: 2003–present
- Labels: Mascot Label Group, Red Hot Records, Controlled Substance Soundlabs, DP Records, Dumpstaphunk, MunckMix, Home Grown Distribution
- Members: Ivan Neville; Ian Neville; Tony Hall; Deven Trusclair; Alex Wasily; Ashlin Parker; John Michael Bradford; Viveca Hawkins; Ari Teitel
- Past members: Nick Daniels III; Raymond Weber; Nikki Glaspie; Alvin Ford, Jr. Ryan Nyther
- Website: www.dumpstaphunk.com

Dumpstaphunk is a funk and jam band from New Orleans, Louisiana, United States.

== Origins and background ==
The quintet's lineup since 2021 features Ivan Neville on vocals, B3 and Clav, both Tony Hall and Nick Daniels III on bass and vocals, Ian Neville on guitar, Deven Trusclair on drums. The band has recently added Alex Wasily on trombone and Ashlin Parker on trumpet.

Formed in 2003, Ivan Neville's Dumpstaphunk was initially put together by keyboardist Ivan Neville on a whim in order to perform a solo gig at the New Orleans Jazz & Heritage Festival. Ivan called in cousin Ian Neville (guitar), Daniels and Hall on bass and vocals, and drummer Raymond Weber (no longer in the band) to round out the show. The band was voted "New Orleans' Best Funk Band" in 2014 by OffBeat Magazine and Gambit Weekly, and has performed at music festivals such as Bonnaroo, Voodoo Experience, Hangout Festival, Caloundra Music Festival, 10,000 Lakes, High Sierra, Outside Lands, Gathering of the Vibes, Dave Matthews Band Caravan, and consecutive appearances at the New Orleans Jazz & Heritage Festival.

"Ivan is the son of Aaron Neville, and he joined his father along with two uncles — Art Neville of The Meters, who defined New Orleans funk, and Cyril Neville — in the Neville Brothers before starting Dumpstaphunk. Their funk follows through on the Nevilles' distinctive style: a complex of syncopations developed from sudden bass lunges, chattery drumming, hooting keyboard chords and wah-wah guitar."

One half of their two-bass lineup, Nick Daniels III, died on April 26, 2024 of complications from multiple myeloma cancer. The band has continued touring with only one bass player and has not announced how the absence of Daniels will affect its lineup going forward.

== Musical style ==
In 2007, The New York Times stated, "Dumpstaphunk is the best funk band from New Orleans right now."

From annual performances at New Orleans' Jazz Fest — "The colossal low end and filthy grooves they threw down from the Gentilly Stage must have set a Jazz Fest record for baddest bass jams ever" (Bass Player magazine, 2012).

"We always keep the spontaneity going, that's something I love about this band," says Ivan. "We can funk it out with the best of them, but we also like to showcase how all sorts of music can come together and push the boundaries of what funk music is."

One critic said, "Dumpstaphunk's groove is a unique monster. It's not the minimalist funk of The Meters and it's not the relentless funk of James Brown, although it has that rhythmic drive. It's not the psychedelic, over-the-top circus of Parliament Funkadelic, but it often has that political slant. It's not the party funk of the Ohio Players, but it shares the high vocals that take the pressure off the bottom. Dumpstaphunk is a whole other school of funk. If you're under 35, you think you've seen funk, but you haven't. You missed the original Meters, James Brown when he wasn't a parody, Parliament Funkadelic's landing of the Mothership, Sly and the Family Stone before he went M.I.A and Booker T. and the M.G.s before the demise of Stax. Dumpstaphunk is as good as all that, and they're in their prime now."

== Recordings ==
Dumpstaphunk's third album, and second full-length record, Dirty Word was released on July 30, 2013. The record featured 11 songs, with special appearances by Trombone Shorty, Ani DiFranco, Flea of the Red Hot Chili Peppers, Rebirth Brass Band, Art Neville and the Grooveline Horns. Ivan Neville said, "The whole record speaks to the righteousness of music. We're not necessarily telling a specific story, but expressing how music makes things right for everyone in their own way. Our fans can feel that vibe and let it take them wherever they need to." "We just hope to spread the good word through funk," added Glaspie. "If we can create an escape, give people a reason to get down and forget their problems, then we're doing what we set out to do."

"Listen Hear provides at long-last the aural, syncopated nastiness listeners have been denied outside of a Dumpstaphunk live performance. Saxophonic magician, Skerik, also guests on the EP. Ivan Neville's Dumpstaphunk is not re-writing the book so much as adding a much needed new testament. While fortunate enough to stand upon the shoulders of giants, make no mistake – Listen Hear is not an attempt at world music or feel-good vibrations, like that of some of their counterparts, but rather straight-ahead inner city funk for the masses. Tracks like 'Living in a World Gone Mad' and 'Turn This Thing Around' describe the troubling times we live in, while songs like 'Meanwhile' and 'Shake' suggest accepting such times in order to enjoy life."

Dumpstaphunk's fourth album, and third full-length record, Where Do We Go From Here was released on April 23, 2021. The record featured 11 songs, with special appearances by Trombone Shorty, Marcus King, and Chali 2na. "We hope people can hear the new songs and are inclined to dance, and inspired to think at the same time", says Ivan, speaking to the new album's delicate balance between topical material and dance-floor rockers.

== Live performances ==
Rolling Stone stated, "Dumpstaphunk has grown from a small side project into one of New Orleans' most prestigious modern funk ensembles."

== Band members ==
=== Current members ===
- Ivan Neville – vocals, keyboards (2003–present)
- Ian Neville – guitar (2003–present)
- Tony Hall – bass guitar, guitar, vocals (2003–present)
- Alex Wasily – trombone (2018–present)
- Deven Trusclair – drums (2019–present)
- Ashlin Parker – trumpet (2021–present)
- John Michael Bradford – trumpet (2021–present)
- Viveca Hawkins – vocals (2024–present; inactive 2025–present)
- Ari Teitel – guitar, vocals (2024–present)
- Rebekah Todd - vocals, percussion (2025-present)

=== Former members ===
- Nick Daniels III – bass guitar, vocals (2003–2024; his death)
- Raymond Weber – drums (2003–2011)
- Nikki Glaspie – drums (2011–2014)
- Alvin Ford, Jr. – drums (2014–2019)
- Ryan Nyther – trumpet (2018–2021)

== Discography ==
=== Studio albums ===
- Listen Hear – Dumpstaphunk (2007)
- Everybody Want Sum – Controlled Substance Soundlabs (2010)
- Dirty Word – Louisiana Red Hot Records (2013)
- Where Do We Go From Here – The Funk Garage (2021)

=== Other appearances ===
- Jazz Fest 2006 – Home Grown Distribution (2006)
- Live at the 2009 New Orleans Jazz and Heritage Festival – MunckMix (2009)
- Jazz Fest 2010 – MunckMix (2010)
- Live at Jazz Fest 2011 – Home Grown Distribution (2011)
- Live at Jazzfest 2012 – MunckMix (2012)
- Live at Syracuse Jazzfest 2026 – (2026)
