= In a World like This (song) =

"In a World Like This"

Single by Backstreet Boys

from the album In a World Like This
- Released: June 25, 2013
- Recorded: March 2013
- Genre: Pop
- Length: 3:40
- Label: K-BAHN; BMG Rights Management
- Songwriters: Kristian Lundin; Max Martin; Savan Kotecha
- Producers: Max Martin; Kristian Lundin

Backstreet Boys singles chronology
"It's Christmas Time Again" (2012)	"In a World Like This" (2013)	"Show 'Em (What You're Made Of)" (2013)

Music video
- "In a World Like This" on YouTube

"In a World like This" is a song by American pop group Backstreet Boys from their eighth (seventh in the U.S.) studio album of the same name. It was released as the album's lead single on June 25, 2013, as a digital download and on July 3, 2013, on CD in Japan. The song was written by Kristian Lundin, Max Martin and Savan Kotecha, and produced by Martin and Lundin. This song was featured on the 2013 compilation album Hitzone 67.

== Background and recording ==
I think 'In a World Like This,' both in a pop world that we've been living in for the past 20 years, and just the world that we live in with all the different things, positive things [and] negative things going on in this entire world. We're still here 20 years later, living in this world that we've created. And I think it's positive, actually. It does kind of sound a little dark, but I think it's positive.

— AJ McLean, MTV

In April 2013, Nick Carter revealed that the group had recorded a song with Swedish producer Max Martin, who was responsible for some of the group's biggest hits, including "I Want It That Way," "Quit Playing Games (with My Heart)" and "Everybody (Backstreet's Back)." Carter called it a "beautiful song" and a "smash". He later described the group's relationship with Martin as "symbiotic" and said, "We've changed each other's lives. Everything seems right now. It just seems like the right fit. The right time for him because he's a really busy man, but what we created together from our hits... they're kind of like masterpieces in his mind. So he wanted to live up to that in a certain way. So that's why it took this long to maybe come back around. It was just the right time for both of us."

On June 18, 2013, Backstreet Boys announced that "In a World Like This" would be released as the first single from their upcoming eighth studio album on June 25. The track subsequently premiered on radio Z100 New York the same day, and was made available on YouTube.

== Commercial performance ==
The single did not enter the overall Billboard Hot 100 due to poor promotion of radio airplay, but it peaked No.18 on Hot Single Sales Chart. The single was a hit in Asia. Continuing the success of their first single, "Straight Through My Heart" from This Is Us, it debuted at No. 13 on Oricon Singles Chart. In the second week it rose and peaked at No. 6, No. 1 on Adult Contemporary Chart, and No. 3 on Airplay Chart. The single also charted at No. 63 on Oricon's Year-End Chart. It was certificated Gold in Japan. The song topped the chart in Taiwan for four consecutive weeks and was the eighth-biggest Western artists' single for 2013.

== Music video ==
The music video for "In a World Like This" was filmed in Los Angeles. The video was premiered on Good Morning America was made available to watch on Vevo shortly after that.

The concept of the video is based on the song lyrics, which are about how love conquers all, and with real love, one can overcome anything. The video explores three well-known moments in American history: the first landing of the moon, the September 11 attacks, and the overturn of Prop 8.

== Track listing ==
- Digital download
1. "In a World Like This" - 3:40
- Japanese CD single
1. "In a World Like This" - 3:39
2. "In a World Like This" (Acapella) - 3:31
3. "In a World Like This" (Instrumental) - 3:39
- The Remixes
1. "In a World Like This" - 3:40
2. "In a World Like This" (Manhattan Clique Club Mix) - 5:57
3. "In a World Like This" (Adam Rockford Remix)- 6:19
4. "In a World Like This" (Varun Remix) - 5:00
5. "In a World Like This" (Drezo Remix) - 6:42
6. "In a World Like This" (DJ Lynnwood Remix) - 6:18

== Charts and certifications ==
=== Weekly charts ===
Chart (2013 - 2015)	Peak position
Belgium (Ultratip Bubbling Under Flanders)	20
Brazil (Billboard Brasil Hot 100)	5
Germany (GfK)	100
Japan (Japan Hot 100)	6
Japan (Hot 100 Airplay)	6
Japan (Adult Contemporary)	1
Japan (Adult Contemporary Airplay)	2
Japan (Japan Hot Top Airplay)	3
Japan (Billboard Japan Hot Overseas)	2
Mexican Airplay Chart (Billboard International)	3
South Korea (Gaon charts)	23
UK Singles (OCC)	155
US Hot Singles Sales (Billboard)	18
US Adult Pop Airplay (Billboard)	34
US Dance Club Songs (Billboard)	35

=== Year-end charts ===
Charts (2013)	Peak position
Japan (Billboard Japan Hot 100)	63
Japan (Billboard Japan Hot Top Airplay)	25
Japan (Billboard Japan Adult Contemporary)	11
Taiwan (Hit FM Western Singles Chart)	8

== Release history ==
Region	Date	Format	Label
United States	25 June 2013	Digital Download	BMG Rights Management
United Kingdom	30 June 2013	Digital Download	BMG Rights Management
Japan	3 July 2013	CD single	BMG Rights Management
Italy	5 July 2013	Contemporary hit radio	BMG Rights Management
United States	23 July 2013	Top 40/Mainstream radio	BMG Rights Management
South Korea	16 August 2013	Digital download	Leaplay Music/Neowiz Internet
