= Salvador (band) =

American Christian band

- Origin: Austin, Texas
- Genres: Contemporary Christian music, latin funk, Mexican rock, Christian rock
- Years active: 1999–present
- Labels: Word/Warner Bros., Inpop
- Members: Nic Gonzales; Josh Gonzales; Chris Bevins; Edwin Santiago; Robert Vilera; Ben Cordonero
- Past members: Adrian Lopez; Art Gonzales; Eliot Torres; Pablo Gabaldon; Billy Griego; Damian Martin; Robert Acuna; Chamo Lopez; Joel Cavazos; Joseph Cavazos; Jared Solis; Jonathan Rangel
- Website: www.salvadorlive.com

Salvador is a Christian band. The band began with brothers Nic and Josh Gonzales as part of the worship band in their home church located in north east Austin, Texas, King of Glory church. They sing in both English and Spanish. The name Salvador is the Spanish word of "Savior", referring to Jesus Christ himself.

== Members ==
=== Current members ===
- Nic Gonzales – lead vocals, guitars
- Chris Bevins – keyboards, backing vocals
- Josh Gonzales – bass, backing vocals
- Ben Cordonero – drums, percussion, backing vocals
- Robert Vilera – percussion
- Edwin Santiago – trumpet, flugelhorn

=== Former members ===
- Adrian Lopez – keyboards, backing vocals
- Art "Pescueeetz" Gonzales – drums
- Eliot Torres – percussion, backing vocals
- Pablo Gabaldon – trumpet, flugelhorn
- Billy Griego – trombone
- Damian Martin – guitars
- Roberto Acuña – drums
- Chamo Lopez – percussion
- Joel Cavazos – guitars
- Joseph Cavazos
- Jared Solis – saxophones, trombone
- John Morales
- Jonathan Rangel
- Mike Montañez - percussion

== Discography ==
=== Studio albums ===
List of albums, with selected chart positions, sales and certifications
Title	Details	Peak positions		
Title	Details	US	US Christ.	US Trop.
Salvador	Release date: June 20, 2000; Label: Word; Formats: CD, digital download	—	31	—
Into Motion	Release date: June 4, 2002; Label: Word; Formats: CD, digital download	198	10	—
Con Poder	Release date: August 12, 2003; Label: Word; Formats: CD, digital download	—	—	7
Worship Live	Release date: September 23, 2003; Label: Word; Formats: CD, digital download	—	—	—
So Natural	Release date: November 9, 2004; Label: Word; Formats: CD, digital download	—	26	—
Que Tan Lejos Esta Cielo	Release date: July 12, 2005; Label: Word; Formats: CD, digital download	—	—	12
Dismiss the Mystery	Release date: August 29, 2006; Label: Word; Formats: CD, digital download	—	25	—
Aware	Release date: April 29, 2008; Label: Word; Formats: CD, digital download	—	38	—
How Far Is Heaven: The Best of Salvador	Release date: February 3, 2009; Label: Word; Formats: CD, digital download	—	—	—
Make Some Noise	Release date: February 22, 2013; Label: InPop; Formats: CD, digital download	—	—	—
Hope Was Born	Release date: October 21, 2014; Label: Lucid Artist; Formats: CD, digital download	—	—	—

=== Singles ===
List of singles, with selected chart positions, showing year released and album name
Year	Title	Peak positions		Album
Year	Title	US Christ.	US Christ. AC	Album
2004	"Heaven"	2	2	So Natural
2005	"You Are There"	27	23	So Natural
2006	"Shine"	2	2	Dismiss the Mystery
2007	"Waterfall"	—	—	Dismiss the Mystery
2008	"Aware"	—	24	Aware
2009	"What Would It Be Like"	—	—	Aware

== Awards ==
=== 2004 ===
- Dove Award at the 35th GMA Dove Awards: Spanish Album of the Year - Con Poder

=== 2008 ===
On the heels of their new album release AWARE, the band along with TobyMac, Third Day, Kelly Clarkson and others performed at the Papal Youth Rally on April 19, 2008, in Yonkers, New York.

== Style ==
Over time the sound has changed from pure Latin funk to more mainstream contemporary and at times a heavier sounds of rock and occasionally the extreme sound of heavy metal riffing in later years. During live shows, Salvador tries to stay with their pure up-tempo Latin sound, while inserting a few more contemporary fan favorites. The band has evolved over the years using a variety of different members to accompany the different range of music and direction the band has taken, such as Latin funk, contemporary, Rock and Roll, and hard rock.

In 1998, the band contributed to the AIDS benefit compilation album Onda Sonora: Red Hot + Lisbon produced by the Red Hot Organization.
