= Concha Buika =

Equatoguinean singer (born 1972)

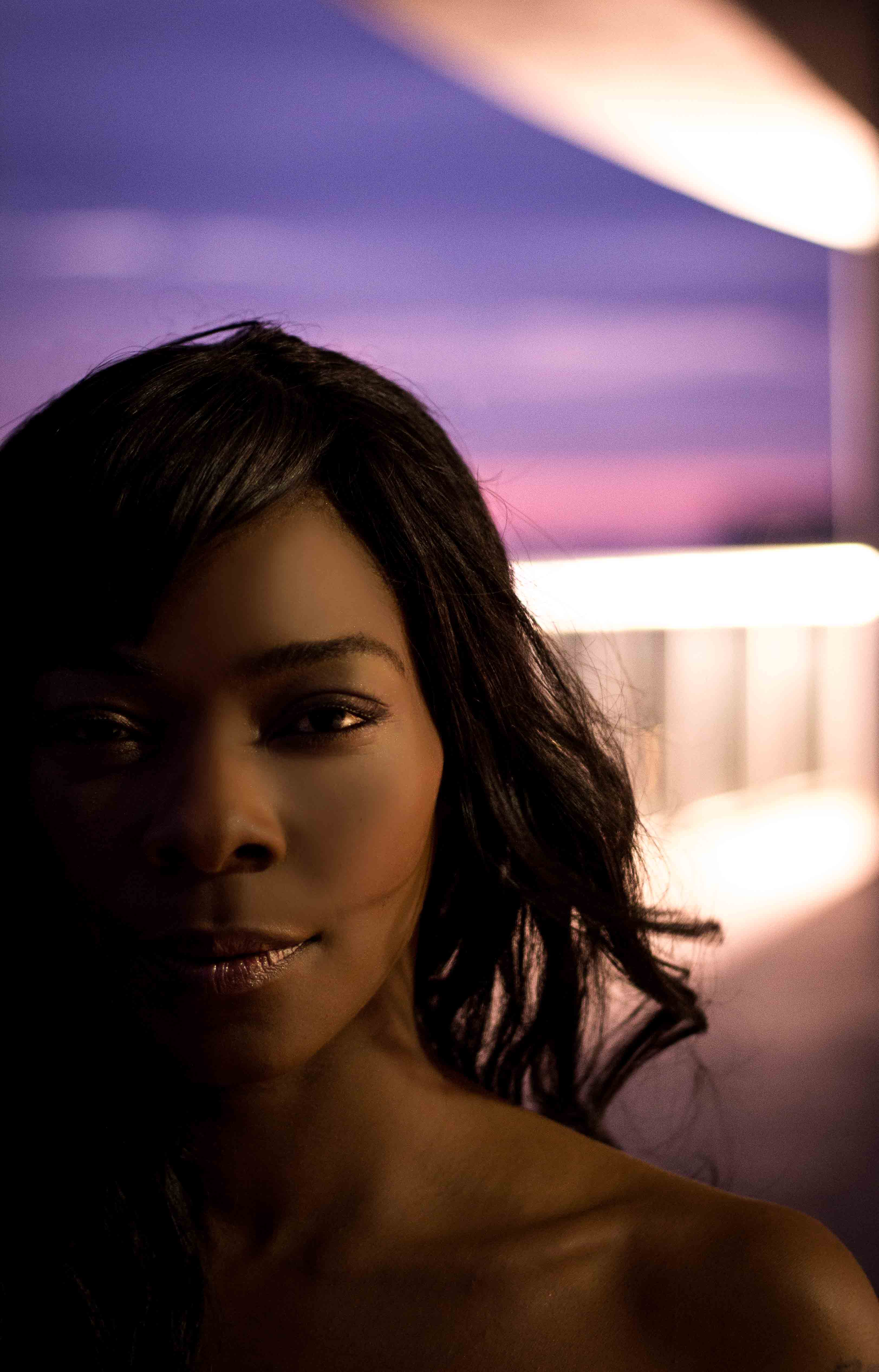
- Buika in 2013

Background information
- Also known as: Buika
- Born: María Concepción Balboa Buika; 11 May 1972 (age 54); Palma de Mallorca, Spain
- Genres: Flamenco; Copla; Soul; Jazz
- Occupation: Musician
- Instrument: Vocals
- Years active: 2000–present
- Label: Warner
- Website: www.conchabuikamusic.com

María Concepción Balboa Buika (born 11 May 1972), known as Concha Buika or just Buika, is a Spanish singer. Her album Niña de Fuego was nominated for the 2008 Latin Grammy Award for Album of the Year and La Noche Más Larga was nominated for Best Latin Jazz Album at the 56th Annual Grammy Awards in 2014.

== Biography ==
Concha Buika was born on 11 May 1972, in Palma de Mallorca in Spain, the daughter of the late writer Juan Balboa and Honorina Buika. Her paternal side, the Balboa, is of distant Cuban descent. Her brother Guillermo "Guillem" Balboa was born in Equatorial Guinea and he is the current alcalde of Alaró, her brother Boré Buika is an actor who has worked on various TV series, such as Aída, El Secreto de Puente Viejo and Anclados, and in movies like Palmeras en la nieve, Villaviciosa de al lado and Señor, dame paciencia. Armando Buika, another of her siblings, is also an actor "Stop Over in Hell" movie and TV series 'Aguila Roja'. Her brother Guillem and her parents were political exiles of their native Equatorial Guinea and arrived to Spain in 1969, three years before Buika's birth. She currently lives in Miami, Florida, United States.

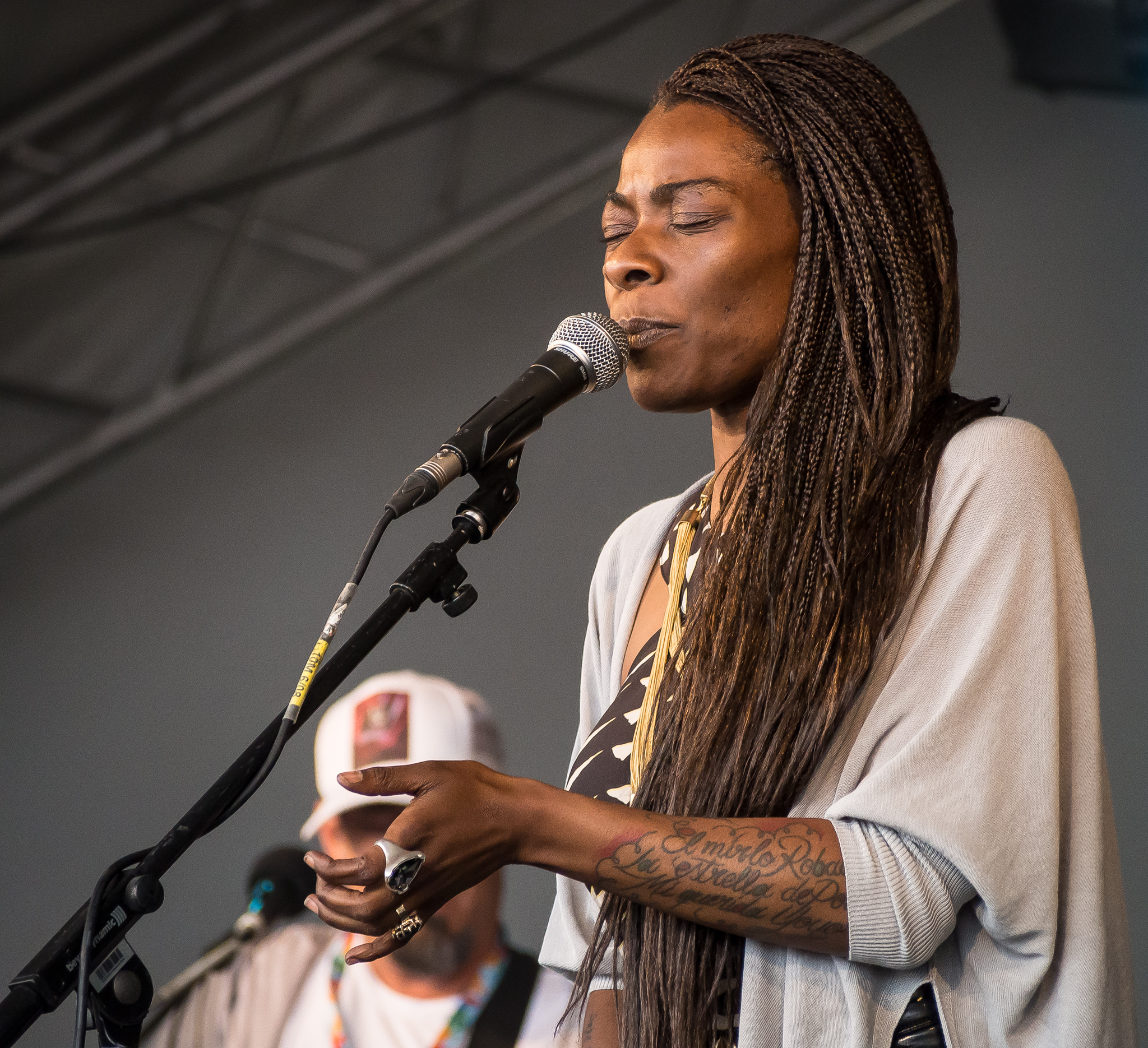
Concha Buika as part of Cerys Matthews R6 Broadcast from WOMAD in 2016

Buika is a singer, poet, composer and music producer. Her music draws on a wide range of influences, from jazz and flamenco to pop, soul and African polyrhythm. She began her career as a drummer and bassist, turning to singing only because "in Spain nobody wanted a female drummer, and I got tired of hearing no, no, no." Buika then gained fame singing coplas in Madrid nightclubs in the late 1990s. She has been compared to Nina Simone, Chavela Vargas, Cesária Évora, Billie Holiday, Edith Piaf, and Amy Winehouse.

In 2000, Buika released her first album Mestizuo (2000, Producciones Blau S.L.). This was followed by Buika (2005, DRO) and a trilogy produced by music producer Javier Limón: Mi Niña Lola (My Girl Lola – 2006, DRO), Niña de Fuego (Girl of Fire – 2008, Warner), which included her first book of poems, and El Ultimo Trago (The Last Sip – 2009, Warner), an anthology album featuring Chucho Valdés, Cuba's standard-bearing pianist, and songs associated with Chavela Vargas, the Mexican ranchera singer.

Buika's largely self-produced seventh album, La Noche Más Larga (Warner), recorded in New York City and Madrid, came out on 4 June 2013. The album contains five of her own compositions, including a collaboration with Pat Metheny on Buika's own composition "No Lo Sé", as well as her take on such classic songs as "La Nave del Olvido", "Don't Explain", "Ne Me Quitte Pas" and "Siboney".

Buika's second book of poems, A Los Que Amaron a Mujeres Dificiles y Acabaron por Soltarse ("To those who loved difficult women and ended up letting go"), came out through Edaf (Madrid) in the fall of 2014. She continues to work on producing her first movie based on one of her poems, which is titled "From Solitude to Hell". Buika is also working on a novel, an opera and an exhibit featuring her photography and her son's artwork.

In the fall of 2015, her eighth album, Vivir Sin Miedo, was released, the first album containing her own compositions sung in English, Spanish and a mix of the two languages. Vivir Sin Miedo was recorded over four months in Miami, New York, London and Madrid, co-produced with producer Martin Terefe. The first track, also titled "Vivir Sin Miedo", was released through all digital channels on 31 July 2015. The album contains a number of collaborations, including with Me'shell Ndegeocello and Jason Mraz.

In 2016 she made her debut at the WOMAD festival in the UK.

Buika has collaborated with musicians, music producers, Djs and singers in Spanish, Catalan, English, French and Portuguese, with artists such as Seal, Nelly Furtado, Anoushka Shankar, Chick Corea, Pat Metheny, Nitin Sawhney, Charles Aznavour, Jason Mraz, Martin Terefe, Apparatjik, Niño Josele, Mariza, Bebo and Chucho Valdes, Luz Casal, Ivan "Melon" Lewis, "Dizzy" Daniel Moorehead, Jose Luis Perales, Armando Manzanero, and Javier Limon amongst others. In 2019 Buika collaborated with Carlos Santana, performing the single "Los Invisibles" in the Bube language.

Buika has also collaborated on the soundtracks of several films. In 2011, director Pedro Almodóvar included two Buika songs--"Por el amor de amar" (For love's sake) and "Se me hizo facil" (I found it easy)--in his movie La piel que habito (The Skin I Live In). Buika also appeared onscreen for the movie.

Buika can be heard in the 2010 Angelina Jolie Shiseido Pasion Commercial.

Buika has performed extensively worldwide, including in the United States, Latin America, Japan, most of Europe, the Balkans, Australia, New Zealand, Turkey, Africa, Argentina, and Mexico within the past year. She has toured with both small ensembles—typically including guitar, bass, trombone, and cajón, as in the Buika Para Mi World Tour 2017—and large orchestras of up to 52 classical musicians plus four jazz performers in the Buika Symphonic Experience, blending classical music and jazz while encouraging improvisation to create a unique audience experience.

The Opera, Day of the Dead was a collaborative performance by Apparatjik, Buika and Void at Festspillene i Bergen 2016. Through a series of real time generated audio-, midi- and motion-reactive layered projections, a unique visual narrative was created to accompany the band's performance.

Buika has not toured the United States since 2020 because of a judgment entered against her for moneys owed to her ex-management company All Parts Move. <https://trellis.law/doc/35218316/judgment>

== Discography ==
- Buika (2005)
- Mi Niña Lola (2006)
- Niña de Fuego (2008)
- La Noche Más Larga (2013)
- Vivir Sin Miedo (2015)
- Para mí (2017)

Collaborations

- Mestizüo (with Jacob Sureda, 2000)
- El Último Trago (with Chucho Valdés, 2009)
- Africa Speaks (with Santana, 2019)

== Awards and nominations ==
Buika's albums have received the following awards:

- Disco de Oro – certified Gold for the album Mi niña Lola, presented by Joaquin Sabina.
- Best Spanish Song Album: Mi niña Lola (Premios de la Musica, 2007 ).
- Best Producer: Mi niña Lola, Javier Limon (Premios de la Musica, 2007 ).
- Germany Visual Critics Award 2007: Mi niña Lola
- Disco de Oro – certified gold for El Ultimo Trago (Colombia, 2010 ).
- Latin Grammy Awards 2010: Best Traditional Tropical Album for El Ultimo Trago.
- Luna del Auditorio Nacional Mexico 2013: Best World Music Act La Noche más Larga
- Antonio-Carlos-Jobim Award Montreal 2017: World Music/ Jazz Cultural crossover.

Buika's albums and songs have received the following nominations:

- Latin Grammy Awards 2008: Album of the Year: Niña de Fuego (2008, Warner/Casa Limon ).
- Latin Grammy Awards 2010: Record of the Year: Se Me Hizo Facil.
- Latin Grammy Awards 2013: Record of the Year: La Nave del Olvido.
- Grammy Awards 2013: Best Latin Jazz Album: La Noche Mas Larga (2013, Warner Music Spain S.L.).
- Latin Grammy Awards 2016: Record of the Year: Si Volveré.
- Grammy Awards 2018: Best World Music Album: Para Mi (2017, Warner Music Spain S.L.).

== See also ==
- Glossary of flamenco terms
