= Dirty Word =

Studio album by Dumpstaphunk
- Released: July 30, 2013
- Genre: R&B
- Length: 52:46
- Label: Red Hot

Dumpstaphunk chronology
Live at Jazzfest 2012 (2012)	Dirty Word (2013)

Professional ratings
Review scores
Source	Rating
Allmusic	4/5 stars
Glide Magazine	6/10

Dirty Word is the second studio album by singer-songwriter Ivan Neville's side project Dumpstaphunk. It was released in July 2013 under Red Hot Records.

== Track listing ==
No.	Title	Length
1.	"Dancin In The Truth"	4:11
2.	"Dirty Word"	5:00
3.	"I Wish You Would"	4:25
4.	"They Don't Care"	5:10
5.	"I Know You Know"	5:07
6.	"If I'm In Luck"	4:58
7.	"Water"	4:35
8.	"Blues Wave"	3:27
9.	"Reality of the Situation"	3:57
10.	"Take Time"	5:28
11.	"Raise the House"	6:28
