= Con Poder (Salvador album) =

Studio album by Salvador
- Released: August 12, 2003
- Genre: Christian music, Christian pop, Christian rock
- Label: Word
- Producer: Carlos Sosa

Salvador chronology
Into Motion (2002)	Con Poder (2003)	Worship Live (2003)

Con Poder is the third album released by Salvador. Released in 2003, it won the Dove Award at the 35th Annual Gospel Music Awards: Spanish language album of the year.

== Track listing ==
1. "Alegría"
2. "Con Poder"
3. "Palabra"
4. "Siempre"
5. "Corazón de Oro"
6. "Día a la Vez"
7. "Montaña"
8. "Ante Tu Presencia"
9. "Danzo Como David"
10. "Día a Día"
