= The Parlotones discography =

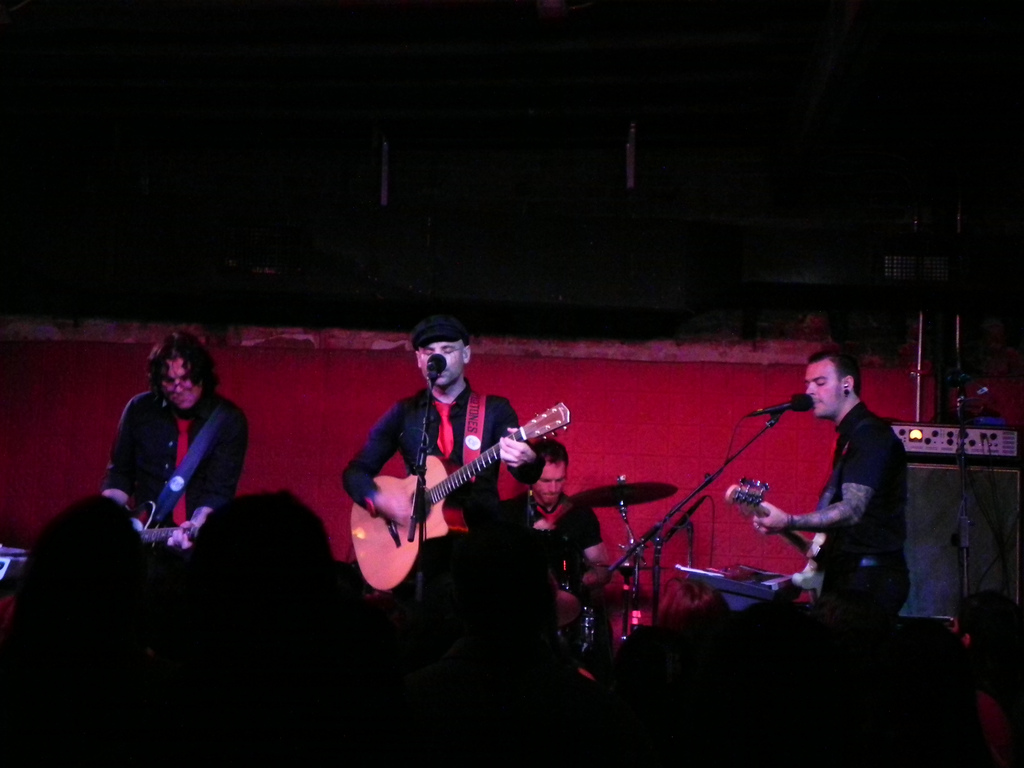
- The Parlotones performing in Germany (2011)
- Studio albums: 8
- EPs: 4
- Live albums: 4
- Compilation albums: 2
- Singles: 20
- Video albums: 5
- Music videos: 22
- Theatrically released films: 2

The discography of the South African rock band The Parlotones consists of eight studio albums, four live albums, two compilation albums, and four extended plays (EPs). The band consists of Kahn Morbee (lead vocals and rhythm guitar), Paul Hodgson (lead guitar), Glen Hodgson (bass guitar, keyboards and backing vocals), and Neil Pauw (drums and percussion).

The band's third studio album, A World Next Door to Yours, has sold more copies in South Africa than Oasis, Coldplay and The Killers combined.

== Albums ==
=== Studio albums ===
List of studio albums, with selected chart positions and certifications
Title	Album details	Peak chart positions		Certifications	Sales
Title	Album details	GER	US	Certifications	Sales
Episoda	Released: 3 December 2003; Label: Sovereign Entertainment; Format: CD, download	—	—		
Radiocontrolledrobot	Released: 20 July 2005; Label: Sovereign; Format: CD, download	—	—	RiSA: 2× Platinum	
A World Next Door to Yours	Released: 28 September 2007; Label: Sovereign; Format: CD, download	—	—	RiSA: 2× Platinum	South Africa: 80,000
Stardust Galaxies	Released: 30 October 2009; Label: Sovereign; Format: CD, download	71	39	RiSA: 2× Platinum	
Eavesdropping on the Songs of Whales	Released: 13 June 2011; Label: Sovereign; Format: CD, download	—	—		
Journey Through the Shadows	Released: 8 May 2012; Label: Sovereign; Format: CD, download	—	—	RiSA: Gold	
Stand Like Giants	Released: 1 September 2013; Label: Sovereign; Format: CD, download	—	—		
Antiques & Artefacts	Released: 15 April 2015; Label: Gallo; Format: CD, download	—	—		
Trinkets, Relics & Heirlooms	Released: 22 April 2016; Label: Gallo; Format: CD, download	—	—		
China	Released: 20 July 2018; Label: Gallo; Format: CD, download	—	—		
Strike the Harp	Released: 11 December 2020; Label: Gallo; Format: CD, download	—	—		

| "—" denotes releases that did not chart.

=== Live albums ===
Title	Album details
Unplugged	Released: 2 September 2008; Label: Sovereign; Format: CD, DVD
Live Design	Released: 28 April 2010; Label: Sovereign; Format: CD, DVD
Live Aus Johannesburg	Released: 29 April 2011; Label: Sovereign; Format: CD, DVD
Dragonflies and Astronauts	Released: 12 October 2012; Label: Sovereign; Format: CD, DVD
Orchestrated	Released: 17 February 2017; Label: Gallo; Format: CD, DVD

=== Compilation albums ===
Title	Album details
Videocontrolledrobot	Released: 2008; Label: Sovereign; Format: CD
Singles: 2004-2014	Released: 10 November 2014; Label: Sovereign; Format: CD
Something Old, Something New, Something Borrowed, Something Blue	Released: 26 July 2019; Label: Gallo; Format: CD, Digital download

=== Extended plays ===
Title	Album details
Superstars	Released: 2002; Label: Sovereign; Format: CD
Borderline Patrol	Released: 2004; Label: Sovereign; Format: CD
Come Back As Heroes	Released: 25 May 2010; Label: Sovereign; Format: CD
Shake It Up	Released: 12 February 2013; Label: Sovereign; Format: CD

== Singles ==
List of singles, with selected chart positions
Title	Year	Peak chart positions		Album
Title	Year	IRE	GER	Album
"Long Way Home"	2004	—	—	Episoda
"Beautiful"	2005	49	—	Borderline Patrol
"Here Comes a Man"	2005	—	—	Borderline Patrol
"Colourful"	2006	—	—	Radiocontrolledrobot
"Overexposed"	2006	—	—	Radiocontrolledrobot
"Dragonflies and Astronauts"	2006	—	—	Radiocontrolledrobot
"A Giant Mistake"	2007	—	—	A World Next Door to Yours
"I'm Only Human"	2007	—	—	A World Next Door to Yours
"I'll Be There"	2007	—	—	A World Next Door to Yours
"Life Design"	2010	—	84	Stardust Galaxies
"Push Me To The Floor"	2010	—	—	Stardust Galaxies
"We Call This Dancing"	2010	—	—	Stardust Galaxies
"Stardust Galaxies"	2010	—	—	Stardust Galaxies
"Come Back As Heroes"	2010	—	45	Come Back As Heroes
"It's Magic"	2011	—	—	Eavesdropping on the Songs of Whales
"Save Your Best Bits"	2012	—	—	Journey Through the Shadows
"Honey Spiders"	2012	—	—	Journey Through the Shadows
"Sleepwalker"	2013	—	—	Stand Like Giants
"Defy Gravity"	2015	—	—	Antiques & Artefacts
"Treasures"	2016	—	—	Antiques & Artefacts
"Can You Feel It?"	2018	—	—	China
"Leave a Light On"	2018	—	—	China
"Antidote"	2019	—	—	China
"Beautiful Life"	2020	—	—	China
"I've Been a Good Boy Santa"	2020	—	—	Strike the Harp
"Christmas (Baby Please Come Home)"	2020	—	—	Strike the Harp
"—" denotes a recording that did not chart.

== Videography ==
=== Theatrically released films ===
Title	Details
Dragonflies and Astronauts	Released: 11 July 2011; Distributor: Nu Metro, Sovereign; Format: 3D theatrical release, DVD
The Parlotones: This Is Our Story	Released: 9 May 2015; Distributor: Nu Metro; Format: theatrical release only

=== Videos ===
Title	Details
Videocontrolledrobot	Released: 2008; Label: Sovereign; Format: DVD
Unplugged	Released: 2 September 2008; Label: Sovereign; Format: DVD
Live Design	Released: 28 April 2010; Label: Sovereign; Format: DVD
The Parlotones Videos	Released: 26 November 2010; Label: Sovereign; Format: DVD
Live Aus Johannesburg	Released: 29 April 2011; Label: Sovereign; Format: DVD
Orchestrated	Released: 17 February 2017; Label: Gallo; Format: DVD

=== Music videos ===
Title	Year	Director(s)	Link	Notes
"Here Comes a Man"	2005		Here Comes a Man on YouTube	
"Beautiful"	2005		Beautiful on YouTube	
"Dragonflies and Astronauts"	2006		Dragonflies and Astronauts on YouTube	
"Colourful"	2006		Colourful on YouTube	
"Louder Than Bombs"	2006		Louder Than Bombs on YouTube	
"Funny Face"	2006		Funny Face on YouTube	
"Overexposed"	2007	Arri Reschke and Claudio Pavan	Overexposed on Vimeo	
"Giant Mistake"	2007	George Webster	Giant Mistake on YouTube	
"I'll Be There"	2007	Claudio Pavan and Bruno Bossi	I'll Be There on Vimeo	
"Lisa se Klavier"	2009		Lisa se Klavier on YouTube	
"I'm Only Human"	2009		I'm Only Human on YouTube	
"Push Me To The Floor"	2009	Jolyon Ellis and Francis Gavin	Push Me To The Floor on YouTube	
"Life Design"	2010		Life Design on YouTube	
"Stars Fall Down"	2010	Claudio Pavan	Stars Fall Down on Vimeo	
"Should We Fight Back"	2010		Should We Fight Back on YouTube	2 videos made - 1 released
"It's Magic"	2011	Ryan Peimer	It's Magic on YouTube	
"Honey Spiders"	2012	Claudio Pavan	Honey Spiders on Vimeo	
"Save Your Best Bits"	2012	Andy Ellis	Save Your Best Bits on YouTube	
"Shake It Up"	2013		Shake It Up on YouTube	
"Sleepwalker"	2014	Kyle Lewis	Sleepwalker on YouTube	
"Defy Gravity"	2015	Michael Robertson	Defy Gravity on YouTube	
"Treasures"	2016	Michael Rix	Treasures on YouTube	
"Can You Feel It?"	2018	Mirror Mountain Pictures	Can You Feel It on YouTube	
"Leave a Light On"	2018	Mirror Mountain Pictures	Leave a Light On on YouTube	
"Antidote"	2019	Ryan Du Toit	Antidote on YouTube	
"Beautiful Life"	2020	Mirror Mountain Pictures	Beautiful Life on YouTube	
"I've Been a Good Boy Santa"	2020	Ryan Du Toit	I've Been a Good Boy Santa on YouTube	
"Christmas (Baby Please Come Home)"	2020	Ryan Du Toit	Christmas (Baby Please Come Home) on YouTube	
