= Sunset Sessions =

American music industry conference

- Dates: February/June
- Frequency: Bi-annually
- Location: United States
- Inaugurated: 1998
- Founder: Michele Clark
- Website: sunsetsessions.org

Sunset Sessions is a conference for music industry professionals, established by indie radio promoter Michele Clark in 1998. It features performances from new musical talent and established acts with the intention of exposing executives to new music while connecting with each other and the artists in intimate settings. It is not open to the public. Invited guests include radio programmers, music supervisors from film, television, ads, games and sports, artists, artists' managers, major and independent record labels, TV bookers, press, booking agents, network executives, influencers, journalists and promotion executives. The conference includes daytime industry panels, keynote speakers and meetings for the industry to discuss current issues. The primary event is usually held in a tropical location and takes place over several days and nights, once or twice per year. There have also been breakout events such as songwriter retreats, South by Southwest showcases, tours, and small showcases.

== Overview ==
Sunset Sessions was created in 1998 by independent radio promotion person Michele Clark as a new way to have the radio programmers in the Triple-A Format see the artists she wanted them to play. It was also created as a way for industry executives to connect on a deeper, social level. Sunset Sessions historically focuses on specific types of music such as the Triple A music format and then later, the Rock and Alternative music formats beginning in 2011.

Sunset Sessions began hosting songwriters retreats in Las Vegas, and created a Sunset Sessions Tour where artists would share touring resources, benefit local charities and visit the cities of the radio stations who attended the Sunset Sessions events. The first tour featured Duncan Sheik, Alpha Rev, Courrier and Laura Warshauer.

Some of Sunset Sessions most notable alumni are Jack Johnson, The Zac Brown Band, Fun., Jason Mraz and The Black Keys

The first time the public could join the event was in November 2012 at The Cosmopolitan in Las Vegas where all proceeds from ticket sales were given to charities chosen by the artists. Stevie Nicks and Carlos Santana participated in this event.

October 2013 Songwriters Retreat took place in Tulum, Mexico. Artists included Bob Schneider, Tristan Prettyman, Anya Marina Kahn Morbee and Glenn Hodgson from South African band The Parlotones Grammy Award winner Alex Cuba, Mark Bryan from Hootie and the Blowfish, Whitebread, Shawn Pereira, Louise Goffin Brittney Rose and others.

The 17th Triple A Sunset Sessions took place in February 2014 in Carlsbad, California with its primary Main Stage shows at the Belly Up Tavern. The public were invited to attend the Belly Up performances as well as Keynote Speaker Erik Logan, President of Oprah Winfrey Network and Harpo Productions, owned by Oprah Winfrey. Marc Geiger, head of music for William Morris Agency as well as acclaimed artist manager Danny Goldberg and many others. Artist line up included return performances from Ziggy Marley who also played Sunset Sessions Hawaii 2003, the John Butler Trio Needtobreathe and The Parlotones all for their 3rd time, Augustana and Beware of Darkness for the 2nd time and new to the Sunset Sessions artist alumni were The Hold Steady, Jeremy Messersmith, Louise Goffin, Robert Delong, Eddie Money (along with the debut of his son Dez Money ), Kodaline, Flagship, and about 30 others. The Recording Academy LA Chapter hosted the Grammy Award Welcome Reception and the event culminated at 4x alumn Jason Mraz 's home studio with an intimate performance by Mraz.

Sunset Sessions produced a SXSW Showcase in Austin Texas with alumni Melissa Etheridge, Bob Schneider, Alpha Rev, The Parlotones, and Louise Goffin at the Paramount Theater.

The 4th Sunset Sessions Rock returned to Carlsbad CA in June 2014, with shows at the Belly Up in Solana Beach California. Artists included Galvanized Souls, Twelve Foot Ninja, Wake the Sun, The Last Year, TODDZERO, Semi Precious Weapons, Ryan Aderrey, Dirty Heads, Gary Calamar, Billy Gill, Black Mambooza, Oh, Be Clever, Kathryn Dean, Letters From the Fire, The Last Internationale, The Whigs, Open Air Stereo, Bushwalla Raining Jane, Scott Weiland and the Wildabouts, Hero The Band, The Young Presidents, Megafauna, Welshly Arms, Heartist and Michael Bernard Fitzgerald. Scott Weiland also did one interview with Matt Pinfield. This was one of Weiland's last performances before he died.

== History ==
Sunset Sessions was founded by Michele Clark, who created Michele Clark Promotion and M:M Music, which did independent radio promotion for over 20 years. Clark has assisted artists by getting them radio airplay primarily in the Triple A radio format.

=== 1998 ===
The first Sunset Sessions was in St. Thomas, U.S. Virgin Islands at the Marriott Hotel and Hard Rock Café in March 1998 and the first artist was Susan Tedeschi (now of the Tedeschi Trucks band).
Additional artists included:
Francis Dunnery, Matthew Ryan and Box Set.

=== 1999 ===
Held at the Westin Regina in Puerto Vallarta, Mexico.
Featured artists:
Wes Cunningham, Lynn Miles, Duke Daniels, Tommy Castro, Kim Richey, Venice, John Eddie, Kory and the Fireflies, Jonatha Brooke and The Nields.

=== 2000 ===
Held at the Westin Regina in Puerto Vallarta, Mexico for the 2nd year in a row.
Featured artists:
Bob Lowery, Peter Searcy, Justin Clayton, Mike Younger, Mark Selby, Deborah Coleman, Jill Sobule, Nina Storey, John Eddie and The Jayhawks.

=== 2001 ===
Held in Cancun, Mexico
Featured Artists:
Yve Adams, Pat McGee, Maia Sharp, Five for Fighting, Amy Correia, Jonatha Brooke, Ryan Adams, Jess Klein, John Eddie, Josh Joplin and Pete Yorn.

=== 2002 ===
Held at Mauai Prince in Maui, Hawaii.
Featured artists:
Maia Sharp, John Eddie, Dishwalla, Phantom Planet, Luce, Shannon McNally, Tommy Castro, Chuck Prophet, Big Head Todd and the Monsters and Johnny A Raul Malo

=== 2003 ===
Held on the Big Island of Hawaii at The Orchid at Mauna Lani
Featured Artists:
Vessica Pisces, Jesse Malin, Colin Blades, The Thorns (Shawn Mullins, Matthew Sweet and Pete Droge), Jennie DeVoe, Edwin McCain, Jack Johnson, Feel, Steve Poltz, Rosanne Cash, Ziggy Marley and Pete Yorn.

=== 2004 ===
Held in the Bahamas at The Atlantis Resort
Featured Artists:
Toots & the Maytals, Donavon Frankenreiter, Joe Firstman, Sophie B Hawkins, Jackson Sneed, The Old 97's, Andy Stochansky, Jen Foster, Ben Aurthur, Indigenous and Rachael Yamagata.

=== 2005 ===
Held at the Westin Regina in Puerto Vallarta, Mexico for the third time
This event included Music supervisor for the first time. Featured Artists:
Cantinero, Billy Miles, Richard Julian, The Young Dubliners, Christine Martucci, Jackie Greene, The Shore, The John Butler Trio, Maia Sharp, Josh Ritter, Charlie Mars and Francis Dunnery.

=== 2006 ===
Held at The Parker in Palm Springs, California
Featured artists:
JJ Appleton, Jamie Cullum, Jacob Miller, Danielia Cotton, Greg Johnson, Amelia White w. Tony Furtado, The Exit, Tom Sartori, Ben Lee, Abbotfinney, Fred Martin & the Levite Camp, Stephen Stills and Jewel.

=== 2007 ===
Held at Paradise Point in San Diego, California
Presented by KPRI Featured artists:
Page Aufhammer, Ten West, Christine Martucci, The Colour, No More Kings, Tyrone Wells, Josh Kelley, Joss Stone, Alexa Wilkinson, Left4Dead, Joshua Radin, Malea McGuinness, Willy Mason, Ozomatli, A Fine Frenzy and The John Butler Trio.

=== 2008 ===
Held at La Costa Resort and Spa in Carlsbad, California. It was here that American singer-songwriter, Jason Mraz launched his Grammy award-nominated single "I'm Yours".
Other featured artists included:
Two Loons for Tea, George Stanford, Jessie Baylin, Tristan Prettyman, Feeding 5000, Virginia Coalition, Cary Brothers, Joie Calio (Dada), Colbie Caillat, NEEDTOBREATHE, Ben's Brother, Jackson Sneed, Tift Merritt, Gabe Dixon Band, Emerson Hart (of the band Tonic), Alexa Wilkinson, Hilary McRae, Dave Barnes, Missy Higgins, James Blunt, Jon Foreman (of the band Switchfoot], Johnathan Rice and The Black Keys.

=== 2009 ===
Held at La Costa Resort and Spa in Carlsbad, California for the second time.
Featured artists:
Zac Brown Band, Eric Hutchinson, Chris Isaak, Meaghan Smith, Jason Reeves, Sara Watkins, Lisa Hannigan, Rick Springfield, Serena Ryder, Robert Francis, Green River Ordinance, Sara Haze, The Rescues, Luke Winslow King, Third Eye Blind, Bascom Hill, Lex Land, Tamarama, Honeyhoney, Mishka, Carolina Liar, Aaron Barnhart, Evan Craft, Jack Tempchin, Crowfield, War Tapes, Maia Hirasawa, The Fab Four, Rachael Sage and Maria Taylor.

=== 2010 ===
Held at the Rancho Bernardo Inn In San Diego, California
Featured Artists:
Alpha Rev, Reni Lane, Robert Francis, Grace Potter & The Nocturnals, Maia Sharp w/ Edwin McCain, Jason Mraz, Saucy Monky, Sara Petite, Joey Ryan, Malea McGuiness, Salvador Santana, Danni Rosner, Bob Burger, Ry Cuming, Sara Haze, Fanfarlo, Kevin Hammond, One EskimO, The John Butler Trio, Holding Air Hostage, ACIDIC, Bob Schneider, Smile Smile, Sarah Jaffe, Dave Barnes, Steven Fiore & Mark Bryan, Daniel Merriweather, Melissa Etheridge, Boscom Hill, Stand, Lisa Bouchelle, NEEDTOBREATHE, The Makepeace Brothers, Landon Pigg, Susan Justice, Tyler Hilton and Nikki & Rich.

=== 2011 ===
(Triple A) Held at La Costa Resort and Spa
Featured Artists:
Bushwalla, Vanessa Carlton, Stevie Nicks, Mike Mills (of R.E.M.), Incan Abraham, Scars on 45, The Makepeace Brothers, Parker Ainsworth, Iron & Wine, Francis Dunnery, Sia, Laura Jansen, The Wood Brothers, MYRADIO, Frentik, Benny Merchant, Lucy Schwartz, Augustana, Andrew Allen, Blame Sally, Sarah Lee & Johnny, Daniel Lanois Black Dub, Black Joe Lewis & The Honeybears, Cas Haley, Eric Berdon, Alex Cuba, Mads Langer, Jason Spooner, k.d. lang, Tori, Emily Hearn w/ Mark Bryan, Ximena Sarinana, The Belle Brigade, Everest, NEeMA, Whitney Wolanin, The Alternate Routes, Nicole Atkins, Crystal Bowersox, John Waite, Chris Amodeo, April Smith & The Great Picture Show, SO & SO and Cody Beebe & The Crooks.

(Rock) Held at La Costa Resort and Spa
Featured Artists:
Redlight King, Deep Dark Robot, Transfer, AWOLNATION, Raine Maida, KO, Sons of The Lawless, 321 Stereo, Donna Loren, Mike Mushok (of Staind), Secondhand Serenade, Jim Lindberg (of Pennywise), Art Alexakis (of Everclear), Givers, Ali Handal, Dead Sara, Drive A, Kopek, DJ's Skratch N' Sniff, Larisa Stow & Shakti Tribe, Innerpartysystem, Incan Abraham, Chris Amodeo & The Modern Minds, Sounds Under Radio, Jenny O., Barcelona, Holcombe Waller, Alex Cuba, Blessed Le Strange, FERAL VINCA, One Less Reason, Unwritten Law, Evan Watson, The Deadlies, Bushwalla and The Wedding.
The event is also credited for exposing the band Dead Sara and for its exclusive world premiere of Staind's self-titled album in 2011.

=== 2012 ===
(Triple A) Held at the Rancho Bernardo Inn In Rancho Bernardo, California
Featured Artists:
ZZ Ward, Sara Milonovich & Daisycutter, Arlan Feiles, Brandon & Leah, Lukas Nelson & Promise of the Real, James Morris, The Pierces, John Eddie, Laura Bell Bundy, Everest, SLATER, Moon Taxi, Arielle Verinis, Oria Aspen, The Empty Pockets, Rebecca Pidgeon, Clark Graham, Chris Shinn, Audra Mae, Marc Scibilia, The Dirt Drifters, Yuna, Eve 6, Jimmy Cliff, The Chamilions feat Pras, Vintage Trouble, Fun., Birdy, Eric Hutchinson, LP, Gary Clark Jr., Sarah Packiam, Gayle Skidmore, Kevin Martin, Rose Cousins, Milow, Jason Mraz, Shawn S.W.I.M. Pereira, Scott H. Biram, Lucinda Williams, Marit Larsen, The Villains, The Parlotones, Tyrone Wells, Bushwalla & Broadway West, Vintage Trouble, The White Buffalo, Rumer, Brothers of Brazil, Everlast, The Makepeace Brothers, Dawn Mitschele, Laura Warshauer, Moi and Steve Poltz.

(Rock) Held at La Quinta Resort in Palm Springs, California.
Featured artists:
Billy Corgan, Richie Sambora, Serj Tankian (of System of a Down), P.O.D., Everclear, Jim Lindberg, Lit, Taproot, 7Lions, A Silent Film, Art Alexakis, Art of Dying, Beware of Darkness, Big B, Black Oxygen, Cheating Daylight, Courrier, Dead Sara, DJ's Skratch n Sniff, Hydro Da Hero, Killinger, Oedipus, SLATER, Sloane, Stellar Corpses, Tanlines, The Last Nova, The NowhereNauts, The Parlotones, The Royalty, Tora and Versus the World.

(All Format) Held at The Cosmopolitan of Las Vegas in Paradise, Nevada.
Featured Artists:
Laura Warshauer, Tora, Jack Tempchin, Susanna Hoffs, Faulkner, Steve Earle, Santana, The James Douglas Show, Joel Piper, Angels Landing, Michael Bernard Fitzgerald, Courrier, JJAMZ, Doris, Duncan Sheik, Stevie Nicks, Dave Stewart, DJs Skratch N Sniff, Brooke Palsson, Clay Priskorn, Lucas Asher, Elliot Root, The NowhereNauts, Cheating Daylight, FERAL VINCA, Stellar Corpses, Beware of Darkness, Tyler Bryant, Lit, SLATER, Alpha Rev, of Verona, Matt White and Olivia Olson.

=== 2013 ===
(Triple A) Held at the Grand Hyatt in San Francisco, California
Featured Artists:
Whitebread, Marie Miller, Devlan James, Gooding, Faulkner, Saints of Valory, John Hiatt, Kate Earl, Finish Ticket, Matt Costa, Anna Rose, The Parlotones, Mishka, Fitz and the Tantrums, Chris Assaad, Anna Bergedahl, Anuhea, Keith Harkin, The Wild Feathers, Dido, Alpha Rev, The Staves, Matt Hires, Milo Greene, Doran Danoff, Savannah Philyaw, Stefani Scovolo, Junkyard Academy, Cael Dadian, Emily Bell, Fernando Perdomo, The Nikhil Korulo Band, Stone Senate, Brett Dennen and Spencer Emanuelle.

(Rock) Held at the Hilton Carlsbad Oceanfront Resort and Spa in Carlsbad, California
Featured Artists:
Yellow Marbles, Cameron Rafati, The Unlikely Candidates, Faulkner, Semi Precious Weapons, Monster Truck, DJ Skratch N Sniff, FERAL VINCA, Big B, OLEANDER, Emphatic, Lonely Kings, Sammy Hagar, Jim Lindberg, Cheating Daylight, Leogun, Dale Earnhardt Jr Jr, 7Lions, Redlight King, Heaven's Basement, Michelle Delamor, Ed Hale and Transcendence, Porter Lori, Clay Priskorn, Beachwood Coyotes, The Negotiators, The Boxer Rebellion, Eve to Adam, ACIDIC, Dig the Kid, Brand New Machine, Strange Native and D-Strutters.

=== 2014 ===
(February's Triple A) Held at the Hilton Carlsbad Oceanfront Resort and Spa Carlsbad, California
Featured Artists:
Arielle, Atlas Road Crew, Augustana, Aurora Barnes, Ben Babylon Band, Beware of Darkness, Charlotte Sabina, Chris Assaad, Common Kings, Dalton Cyr, Dez Money, Eddie Money, Eric Zayne, Flagship, Franki Love, Galea Brown, Gary Calamar, The Hold Steady, January Blu, Jeremy Messersmith, John Butler Trio, Jonny Kaplan, Kahn Morbee, Kodaline, London Rose, Louise Goffin, The Mastersons, Needtobreathe, Nikki Lane, The Parlotones, Porter Lori, RJ Comer, Rob Drabkin, Robert Delong, Shane Piasecki, Skratch N Sniff, Spencer Emmanuelle, Trevor Holmes, Vance Joy, Vintage Trouble, The Wind and the Wave, Ziggy Marley.

SXSW Sunset Sessions Alumni Held at The Paramount Theater in Austin, Texas
Featured Artists:
Alpha Rev, Bob Schneider, Melissa Etheridge, Louise Goffin, The Parlotones

(June's Rock and Alternative) Held at the Hilton Carlsbad Oceanfront Resort and Spa in Carlsbad, California
Featured Artists:
Billy Gill, Black Bambooza, Bushwalla, Charlie Rae, Dirty Heads, DJ Muggs, Galvanized Souls, Gary Calamar, Godsmack, Heartist Hero The Band, Jack Tempchin, Kathryn Dean, Kevin Wood, Letters From the Fire, MegaFauna, Michael Bernard Fitzgerald, Oh, Be Clever, Open Air Stereo, Raining Jane, Ryan Aderrey, Scott Weiland and The Wildabouts, Semi Precious Weapons, Skratch N Sniff, The Last Internationale, The Last Year, The Whigs, The Young Presidents, ToddZero, Twelve Foot Ninja, Wake the Sun, Welshly Arms, Whitebread

=== 2015 ===
Held at various hotels on the beach in Tulum, Mexico. During the days, radio and music supervisors were treated to special acoustic performances by Kaleo, Panic is Perfect and others in the Life Source Retreats Yoga Studio. They also enjoyed yoga classes, were healed by shaman, and covered each other in Mayan clay.
Featured artists:
Half Moon Run, Kaleo (band), Alpha Rev, Hollis Brown, Gary Calamar, Panic is Perfect, Shawn Pereira, Buswalla, Micca, Austin Plaine, Tropo, Surreal McCoys, Bruce Sudano and The Candyman Band, Mateo Stevens, Bandikoro and Brett Ball. The event was Kaleo's introduction to the US music industry.
