= Under the Bed =

Under the Bed may refer to:

- "Under the Bed" (The Outer Limits), a 1995 television episode of The Outer Limits
- Under the Bed (album), a 2008 album by Josh and the Empty Pockets
- Under the Bed (film), a 2012 American horror film directed by Steven C. Miller
- Under the Bed 2, a 2014 Chinese horror film that is the second of a Chinese film series sharing the same title
- Under the Bed 3, a 2016 Chinese horror film that is the third of a Chinese film series sharing the same title
