= Borderline Patrol =

EP by The Parlotones
- Released: 29 November 2004
- Genre: Indie rock
- Length: 14:41
- Label: Sovereign Entertainment; Universal

The Parlotones chronology
Episoda (2003)	Borderline Patrol (2004)	Radiocontrolledrobot (2005)

Singles from Borderline Patrol
- 1. "Beautiful"; 2. "Here Comes a Man"

Borderline Patrol is a four-track EP released by The Parlotones in 2004.

== Track listing ==
All tracks are written by The Parlotones

No.	Title	Length
1.	"Beautiful"	3:49
2.	"Pretend"	3:04
3.	"Tiny"	3:46
4.	"Here Comes a Man" (written by Boom Boom Room)	4:02
Total length:		14:41

== Personnel ==
- Kahn Morbee – lead vocals, rhythm guitar
- Paul Hodgson – lead guitar
- Glen Hodgson – bass guitar, backing vocals
- Neil Pauw – drums
