= The Empty Pockets =

American rock & roll band

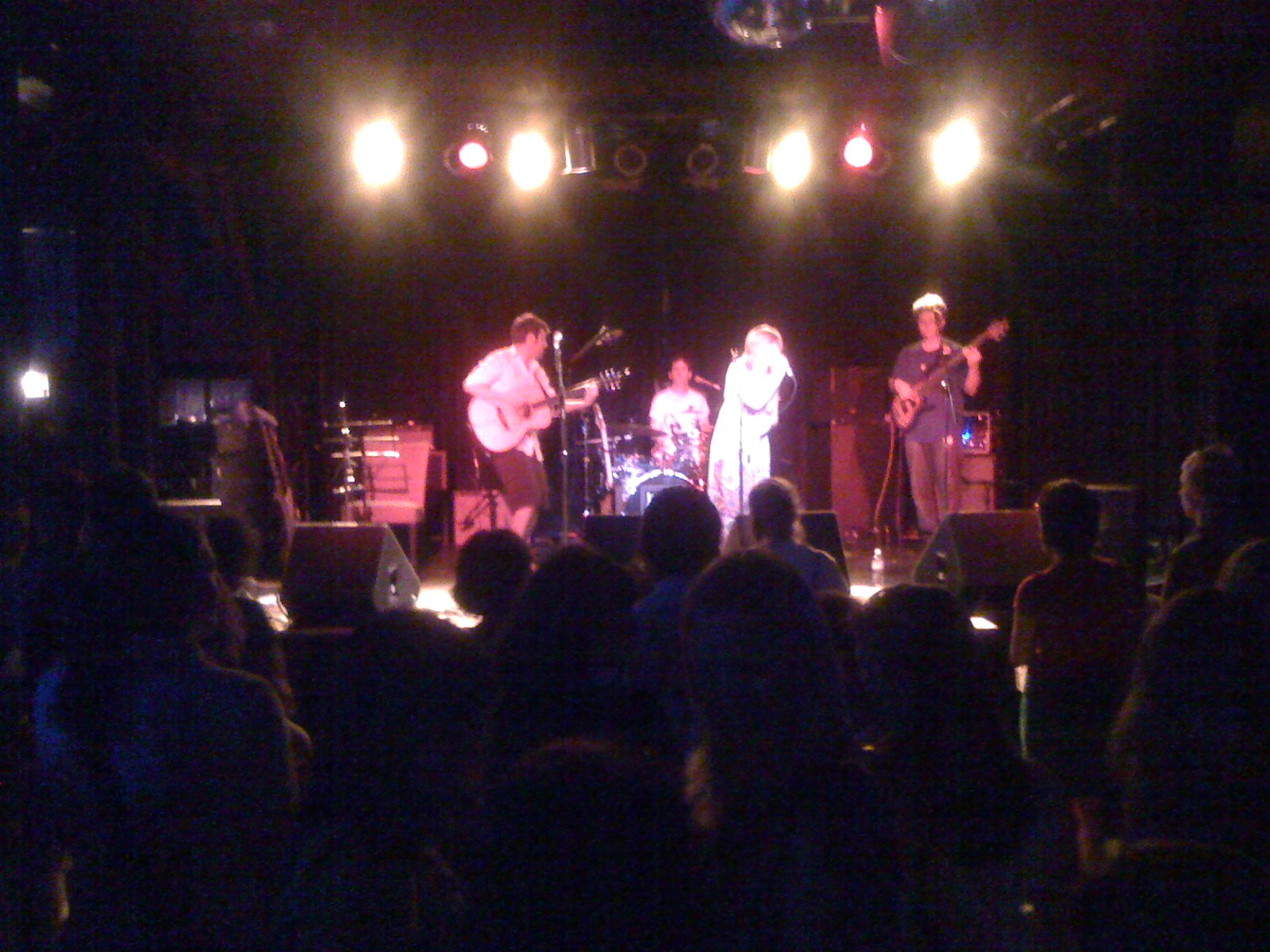
- Performing at Double Door in 2008 (left to right: Josh, Danny, Erika, Nate.)

Background information
- Origin: Chicago, Illinois, United States
- Genres: blues, Americana, rock and roll, rockabilly
- Years active: 2006–present
- Labels: MT Pockets Music, Inc.
- Members: Josh Solomon; Nate Bellon; Adam Balasco; Erika Brett
- Past members: Danny Rosenthal
- Website: theemptypockets.com

The Empty Pockets (formerly known as Josh & The Empty Pockets) is an American rock and roll band from Chicago, Illinois. Josh & The Empty Pockets released a Buddy Holly Tribute album in 2007 and Under the Bed in 2008, with Erika Brett featured on two of the songs. The band changed its name to The Empty Pockets following the addition of Erika Brett to its lineup. The Empty Pockets released two EPs, one of which features holiday songs.

The group is composed of four members: Josh Solomon, guitar and lead vocals; Nate Bellon, bass and lead vocals; Adam Balasco, drums; and Erika Brett, keyboard and lead vocals.

== History ==
=== Josh & The Empty Pockets ===
Josh Solomon (guitar and vocals) grew up in Lincolnwood, Illinois, playing music with his childhood friends Nate Bellon (bass and vocals) and Danny Rosenthal (drums). Shortly after forming the band in 2006, Solomon was cast as Buddy Holly in the 2006-2007 production of Buddy: The Buddy Holly Story at Chicago's Mercury Theatre. Bellon and Rosenthal were cast as The Crickets in the show. During the run, the band met Erika Brett (keyboard and vocals), who was a singer and dancer in the show. Alongside the production, Josh & The Empty Pockets released a Buddy Holly tribute album called Not Fade Away.

==== Under the Bed ====
Josh & The Empty Pockets released their first album comprising 10 original songs, Under the Bed, in 2008. In an interview with Phil Ponce on Chicago Tonight in April 2009, Josh explained that the debut album is about growing up and that the title Under the Bed comes from the lyrics "where have the monsters under my bed gone" on one of the songs. Erika Brett was featured on "Let Go" and "Fall Right Now." The album was produced by Rick Fritz. All ten of the tracks were placed on the Nickelodeon TV channel's programs iCarly, Zoey 101 and Drake & Josh.

===== Fall Right Now =====
As part of that release, the band promoted the single "Fall Right Now" to medium and secondary markets and it reached #11 on the FMQB AC chart. The album's single, "Fall Right Now" is said to be inspired by Erika Brett. The band also recorded an acoustic version of the song at Sweetwater Studios included with a second previously unrecorded song called "Leaving Jackson" on WAJI's annual charity CD, a fundraising project for Riley Children's Hospital, with other notable artists including Ingrid Michaelson, Gavin DeGraw, Uncle Kracker, Vertical Horizon and Eric Hutchinson, among others.

=== The Empty Pockets ===
==== Baby It's Cold Outside/Baby Please Come Home ====
The band added Erika Brett as their female vocalist before recording and releasing a Christmas single in 2008, a rock arrangement combining "Baby, It's Cold Outside" and "Baby Please Come Home." The song peaked the week of Christmas 2008 and reached #51 on the Mediabase AC chart playing on radio stations across the United States. The following year, the single reached #36 on the Mediabase AC chart in November. That month it was the #1 song played in several cities including KQIS in Lafayette, Louisiana WJYE in Buffalo, New York, and WYYY in Syracuse, New York. By the first week of December the single reached #31 on the Mediabase Christmas chart and was the #1 played song on WEZF in Burlington, Vermont.

==== Signing ====
The album "Under The Bed" was re-released nationwide in stores, as well as online outlets, in April, 2009. Later that year, David Spero, manager of Joe Walsh, Cat Stevens and Dickey Betts, became the band's manager. After signing, promotion of the single "Fall Right Now" to major radio markets got underway, which saw it receive airplay on a number of Clear Channel and other monitored stations. During March and April the single appeared twice on Mediabase's weekly Taking Off airplay chart, which lists "the Top 50 currents by most new spins, showing detections for the first time." The track reached #77 on the Mediabase Hot AC chart, and #65 on the Adult Contemporary chart.

==== EP releases ====
In 2011, the band released a six-song EP called Introducing The Empty Pockets. "Take Me," one of the songs released on Introducing The Empty Pockets, was featured in the award-winning documentary, Patrol Base Jaker. That same year, the band revisited holiday music with a five-song album entitled A Holiday Staycation with The Empty Pockets.

==== The Ten Cent Tour ====
In 2015, The Empty Pockets released the album, The Ten Cent Tour. Radio One Chicago praised "their first full-length album recorded in a studio they built with their bare hands. The Ten Cent Tour is a leap forward for the already-accomplished band. Solomon’s smooth pop vocals possess a newfound throaty gusto, while Brett’s bring a sort of polished abandon to the proceedings. The rhythm section of Rosenthal and Bellon finds a groove from the first track and doesn’t let go.

But it is the group's eponymous song, “Empty Pockets,” which focuses on the group as a whole rather than on any individual member. The song reflects the group's approach as a band.

Beyond the Buddy Holly influence, the new batch of songs bring to mind modern Americana tentpoles like Drive-By Truckers, soul studio artists like Raphael Saadiq, bands like JC Brooks & the Uptown Sound, and 1990s pop-rockers such as Blues Traveler. These influencers result in handcrafted rock ‘n roll.

== Touring ==
In late 2008, the band performed along the Mexican Riviera on the Sapphire Princess cruise ship. Since, the band has continued to tour the United States. The Empty Pockets have played many venues in Chicago, including headlining twice at the Double Door in 2008 and 2009. In March, 2009, the band played at the South by Southwest music festival in Austin, Texas. In June, 2009, the band played at Chicago's Millennium Park at the WTMX-sponsored Party in the Park event and at the same event in July, 2010.

In June 2010, the band kicked off the 2010 Concert Series at Evergreen Lake, Colorado, playing songs from their first album, Under the Bed, as well as several unreleased songs. On October 5, 2010, The Empty Pockets played at the House of Blues for Michigan Avenue Magazine's second anniversary party, which also featured performances by Jennifer Hudson and DJ Rock City. In June 2011, the band opened for Dave Mason at the Beverly Arts Center. In 2012, The Empty Pockets headlined for comedian George Lopez, Dickey Betts, Richie Furay, and Kansas. That same year they also performed at Michele Clark 's Sunset Sessions, where they played alongside Jason Mraz, Jimmy Cliff, Fun, among others; followed by Sunset Sessions showcases at the Hotel Café, and the Belly Up in San Diego. The band also headlined at The Bitter End and the Palms Resort & Casino in Las Vegas. In May 2013, the band performed at the Niagara Falls Hard Rock Café. In August of that year, The Empty Pockets opened for Dickey Betts again at the City Winery in Chicago. The band toured with Richie Furay, playing three shows together, in 2013, at Kent Stage, Fairfield Theatre Company, and at B.B. King's NYC. In October 2013, Josh was selected to participate in the Sunset Sessions Alumni Songwriting Retreat in Tulum, Mexico with Mark Bryan from Hootie & the Blowfish, Bob Schneider, Louise Goffin, Tristan Prettyman and members of the Parlotones. In December that year they opened for Paul Thorn at the Beachland Ballroom in Cleveland, Ohio.

Since 2013, The Empty Pockets opened for Buffalo Springfield's Richie Furay and also performed as his band at the Rock and Roll Hall of Fame, as well as opening for Pure Prairie League and Bob Schneider. Building their reputation as "musicians' musicians," the band continues to work with legendary artists, including touring as the backing band and support act for Al Stewart ("Year of the Cat") and Gary Wright ("Dreamweaver"), while simultaneously producing, recording and performing live with Bad Company's Simon Kirke to promote his solo record, All Because of You (BMG), recorded in The Empty Pockets' studio in Chicago. Rolling Stone said of the collaboration, "Though he's hung his hat in New York City for years, Kirke shows an enviable rapport with bandmates Josh Solomon, Erika Brett, Nate Bellon and Danny Rosenthal, members of polished yet rootsy Chicago outfit Empty Pockets." The band has also backed up Kenny Loggins, performing his hits, as well as sharing Empty Pockets' original material as part of the SoundExchange Influencer's Series.

In November 2022, the Empty Pockets opened for Al Stewart at Hangar 11, Tel Aviv, in their Israeli debut.

== Reception ==
=== Josh & The Empty Pockets ===
Daily Vault staff writer Duke Egbert described their sound as "harmony-drenched," and labeled it "intelligent" yet unpretentious and "well-crafted." Egbert rated the Under the Bed "one of the better new CDs I've heard this year," and complimented the wordplay of "Missteps," and "Monsters," among others. Echoing the sentiments of prior reviews, Amy Lotsberg, a music critic and producer of Collected Sounds, wrote "Josh Solomon has a pleasing voice. It's clear, and easy to understand, which is important because the lyrics are clever." Lotsberg deemed the songs "melodic and interesting."

=== The Empty Pockets ===
AMD Entertainment's My Nguyen described The Empty Pockets as vibrant and energetic with a range of influences varying from "classic pop-rock to doo-wop." Clinton Weiderholt of Vocals on Top wrote that the band has a listener friendly sound with vocals on top of the music, which is refreshing. He calls the band "catchy and fun" and mentions "All I Need" as being the "strongest song of the evening in St. Joseph." Peter Jurew & Lou Montesano of Elmore Magazine opine, "worthy of mention are the Empty Pockets, a tight and soulful quartet who are much more than just a backing band. They are credited as Kirke’s writing partners on the new album and have their own songs and their own sound. With Josh Solomon on guitar and vocals and Erika Brett on keyboards and vocals, they tend toward lighter pop melodies but managed to cover the harder-rocking Bad Company tunes without dropping a beat."

== Discography ==
Title	Album details	Peak chart positions			
Title	Album details	US Heat	US Folk	US Indie	US Blues
Under the Bed	Release date: January 2, 2008; Label: 8th Impression	—	—	—	—
Introducing the Empty Pockets (EP)	Release date: 2011	—	—	—	—
A Holiday Staycation	Release date: 2011	—	—	—	—
The Ten Cent Tour	Release date: June 2, 2015; Label: MT Pockets Inc.	9	—	30	—
Voices	Release date: September 1, 2017; Label: MT Pockets	—	9	14	—
Snow Day	Release date: 2018	—	—	—	—
Tanglewoods	Release date: January 18, 2019	—	—	—	—
Live in Seattle	Release date: June 14, 2019; Label: MT Pockets Music, Inc.	—	—	—	—
Outside Spectrum	Release date: 2022; Label: MT Pockets Music, Inc.	—	—	—	1
Party at the North Pole	Release date: 2022; Label: MT Pockets Music, Inc.	—	—	—	—
Gotta Find the Moon	Release date: September 7, 2023; Label: MT Pockets Music, Inc.	—	—	—	1
Oh! Darling (single)	Release date: June 18, 2024; Label: MT Pockets Music, Inc.	—	—	—	—
Al Stewart & The Empty Pockets Live	Release date: August 6, 2024	—	—	—	—
"—" denotes releases that did not chart
