= One the Juggler =

One the Juggler was a British alternative rock band. The name was derived from the first Tarot card. It was chosen to complement the band's Gypsy image.

The group signed a record contract with RCA Records in 1982. They had a minor hit in the UK Singles Chart when their track "Passion Killer" spent one week at No. 71 in February 1983. They supported artists such as Elvis Costello and Eurythmics. In 1985, a contractual dispute resulted in their last album, produced and played on by Mick Ronson, not being promoted. The group disbanded soon afterward.

The band's first album Nearly a Sin was re-released by Angel Air Records on CD in 2015 and met with positive reviews.

The band released a brand new album titled 'Imperial Way' on Cadiz Music/Real Vision in May 2026.

== Personnel ==
One the Juggler had a number of different line-ups. Musicians who played with the band included the following:

- Rokko (Raymond Morris), vocals and acoustic guitar
- Lushi Lee (Jerry Thornton-Jones), bass guitar. Lee later went on to play with Boom Boom Room Now playing in Glamweazel.
- Colin Minchin (Lin), Lead guitar. Formerly played with Tennis Shoes. Now playing in Glamweazel.
- Steve Nichol, drums. Nichol formerly played with Eddie and the Hot Rods
- Mick Rossi, guitar. Rossi had also played with Slaughter and the Dogs
- MoMo Blackford, guitar. Formerly of Ligotage, and later went on to Nasa.
- Nigel 'Charlie' Mead, bass. Mead had also played with Mike Scott Waterboys and Slaughter and the Dogs
- Steve Bray, drums. Bray later went on to play with Squeeze
- Joe Slythe, drums. Slythe played in Splodgenessabounds under the name 'Desert Island Joe'
- Mick Ronson, guitar. Ronson produced and played on the group's last album Some Strange Fashion
- Dave Lowe, drums. Played for 2015 reunion gigs and plays with Glamweazel and The Ramshackles.
