= Boom Boom Room =

English band

- Origin: United Kingdom
- Genres: Pop
- Labels: Fun After All, Epic
- Past members: Andy Nakanza; Chris "Inz" Storer; Skid; Lushi

Boom Boom Room were an English band which formed in 1985, comprising Andy Nakanza (vocals), Skid (drums), Inz (bass), and Lushi (rhythm guitar). Lushi was also in a band called One the Juggler. Andy was also in a band called Zero LeCrêche.They had one single in the UK Singles Chart, "Here Comes the Man", which entered the chart on 8 March 1986, and reached #74; it was in the chart for one week.

The song was later covered by The Parlotones, appearing on their EP Borderline Patrol in 2004, and their debut studio album, Radiocontrolledrobot, in 2005.

== Discography ==
=== Albums ===
- Stretch (1987, Epic)

=== Singles ===
- "Here Comes the Man" (1986, Fun After All)
- "Here Comes the Man" (1986, Epic)
- "Take Your Time" (1986, Epic)
- "Julie" (1987, Epic)
- "Love Your Face" (1987, Epic)
