= Atlas Road Crew =

American rock band

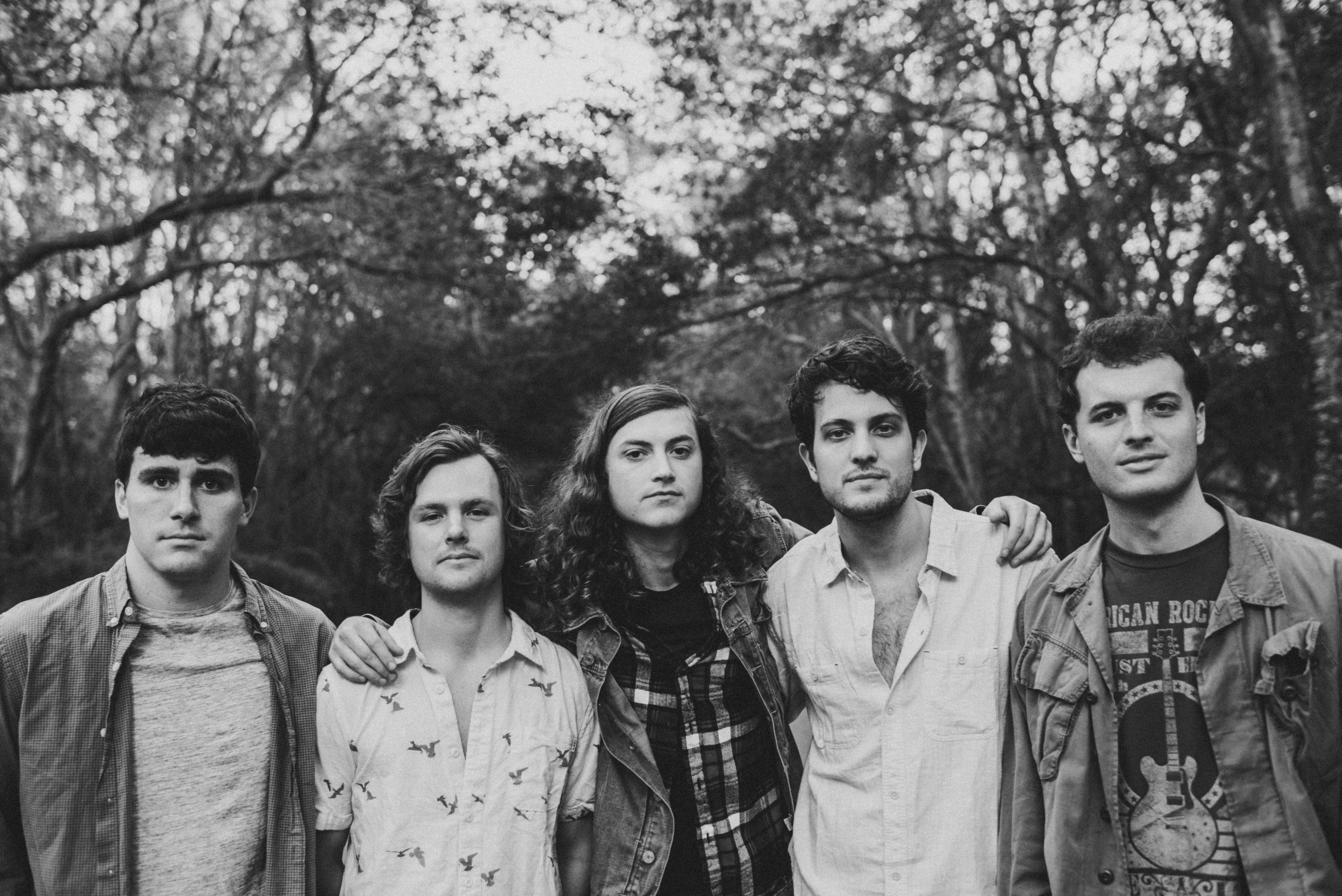
- Atlas Road Crew in 2015

Background information
- Origin: Columbia, South Carolina, US
- Genres: Alternative rock; southern rock
- Years active: 2011–present
- Label: Independent
- Members: Taylor Nicholson; Dave Beddingfield; Max Becker; Bryce James; Patrick Drohan
- Website: atlasroadcrew.com

Atlas Road Crew is an American alternative rock-southern rock band based in Charleston, South Carolina. It was founded in 2011 by Taylor Nicholson (vocals, guitar), Dave Beddingfield (guitar), Max Becker (bass guitar), Bryce James (piano), and Patrick Drohan (drums) while they were attending the University of South Carolina.

== History ==
In October 2012, Atlas Road Crew released their first studio effort Atlas Road Crew. The EP features five tracks produced by Mark Bryan of Hootie and The Blowfish recorded in Charleston, South Carolina. In February 2014, the group performed at Michele Clark's 16th annual Sunset Sessions alongside Needtobreathe, John Butler Trio, Vance Joy, Augustana, Ziggy Marley, and many more.

In February 14, 2015, Atlas Road Crew released their first full-length studio effort, Halfway to Hopkins, independently. The album featured 10 new tracks. Four songs were produced by Rick Beato (Needtobreathe, Shinedown, Trey Anastasio); four tracks by Cory Plaugh; and two tracks by Jay Clifford. Halfway to Hopkins was recorded in Atlanta, Columbia, and Charleston. The band released its song Voices as a teaser to the album.

In June 2014, Atlas Road Crew appeared at the Wakarusa Music and Camping Festival. Later that summer, the band had its first TV song placement in MTV's Finding Carter with its song Bottom of Love.

The group was named one of LiveMusicDaily.com's top 25 artists to see in 2015. In a July 2015 album review, Relix Magazine said Atlas Road Crew showcases their "penchant for tight, punchy, Southern alt-rock" in album "Halfway to Hopkins".

In 2016, the band went on a 31-date European tour with visits to Germany, Spain, France, The Netherlands, Slovakia, and Belgium. They returned to the U.S. in March, supported acts such as The Drive By Truckers and Hootie & The Blowfish, and performed at Electric Forest Festival in Rothbury, Michigan.

In early 2017, Atlas Road Crew released a new single entitled My Own Way which was co-written with Steven Fiore (Young Mister).

== Discography ==
- Atlas Road Crew (EP, 2012)
- Halfway to Hopkins (2015)

== Band members ==
- Taylor Nicholson – lead vocals
- Dave Beddingfield – lead guitar
- Patrick Drohan – drums
- Max Becker – bass
- Bryce James – piano, organ, vocals
