= Eavesdropping on the Songs of Whales =

Studio album by The Parlotones
- Released: 13 June 2011
- Genre: Indie rock
- Length: 57:05
- Label: Sovereign Entertainment

The Parlotones chronology
Stardust Galaxies (2009)	Eavesdropping on the Songs of Whales (2011)	Journey Through the Shadows (2012)

Singles from Eavesdropping on the Songs of Whales
- 1. "It's Magic"

Professional ratings
Review scores
Source	Rating
Channel24	2/5 stars
DRUM	4/5 stars

Eavesdropping on the Songs of Whales is the fifth album by South African rock band The Parlotones. It was released on 13 June 2011 by Sovereign Entertainment. It is their first acoustic collection of previously released songs, re-recorded at a studio in South Africa.

It contains two previously unreleased songs, including the radio single "It's Magic". The album art is an adaptation of Neil Pauw's paintings.

== Track listing ==
All tracks are written by The Parlotones

No.	Title	Length
1.	"It's Magic"	3:20
2.	"Inside"	3:52
3.	"Life Design"	3:43
4.	"Long Way Home"	4:13
5.	"Beautiful"	4:43
6.	"Bird in Flight"	4:02
7.	"Radiocontrolledrobot Medley"	7:09
8.	"Should We Fight Back"	3:49
9.	"I'm Only Human"	4:23
10.	"Giant Mistake"	4:04
11.	"Push Me to the Floor"	3:02
12.	"Tiny"	4:35
13.	"We Call This Dancing"	3:25
14.	"Burning Love" (written by Dennis Linde)	2:45
15.	"Disappear Without a Trace" (only Deluxe Edition)	4:21
16.	"Best Bits" (only Deluxe Edition)	3:03
17.	"Suitcase" (only Deluxe Edition)	3:20
18.	"Baby Be Mine" (only Deluxe Edition)	3:17
19.	"Remember When" (only Deluxe Edition)	3:48
Total length:		57:05 (74:54 Deluxe Edition)

== Personnel ==
- Kahn Morbee – lead vocals, rhythm guitar
- Paul Hodgson – lead guitar
- Glen Hodgson – bass guitar, backing vocals
- Neil Pauw – drums
- Philip Nolte, Jacques Bezuidenhout, Zamani Nxumalo, Garth Payne, Johan Gous, Lwando Sirenya, Sifiso Masemola, Themba Shabalala - soloists
