= China (The Parlotones album) =

Studio album by The Parlotones
- Released: 20 July 2018
- Studio: High Seas Studios, Johannesburg
- Genre: Indie rock; synth-pop; new wave
- Label: Gallo; OK!Good Records; Butler Records
- Producer: The Parlotones; Jacques Du Plessis

The Parlotones chronology
Orchestrated (2017)	China (2018)	Something Old, Something New, Something Borrowed, Something Blue (2019)

Singles from China
- 1. "Can You Feel It?" Released: 6 July 2018; 2. "Leave a Light On" Released: 30 November 2018; 3. "Antidote" Released: 19 July 2019; 4. "Beautiful Life" Released: 20 March 2020

China is the tenth studio album by the South African rock band The Parlotones. It was released July 2018 initially as a double album in South Africa under Gallo Record Company and in 2019 as a single disc both in the United States under Ok!Good Records and in Europe under Butler Records. The album received the nomination for "Best Rock Album" from the 25th South African Music Awards.

It is the first album to feature keyboardist Rob Davidson, who was previously a touring member for the group.

== Track listing ==
All tracks are written by The Parlotones

CD1
No.	Title	Length
1.	"Buckle Up"	4:01
2.	"Antidote"	4:00
3.	"Leave a Light On"	3:59
4.	"Jennifer"	2:29
5.	"Can You Feel It?"	3:33
6.	"Downtown Love"	4:27
7.	"Beautiful Life"	3:47
8.	"Like Dynamite"	4:35
9.	"Golden Lion"	3:15
10.	"Maya"	3:46
11.	"Side by Side"	3:29
12.	"Young and the Guilty"	3:34
13.	"The Whole of the Moon"	4:37

CD2
No.	Title	Length
1.	"Welcome the Wonderful"	3:43
2.	"Only the Good Die Young"	3:56
3.	"Manufactured Kings"	3:45
4.	"We Can‘t Eat Money"	4:36
5.	"I Feel Over Nothing"	4:13
6.	"Twilight Years"	3:33
7.	"Lisa Se Klavier"	4:39
8.	"For Now"	4:07
9.	"Heat of the Moment"	3:47
10.	"Rock N' Roll"	4:14
11.	"Keep Reminding Me"	4:42
12.	"Goodbye To The Show"	4:02

United States release tracklist
No.	Title	Length
1.	"Antidote"	4:00
2.	"Leave a Light On"	3:59
3.	"Can You Feel It?"	3:33
4.	"Beautiful Life"	3:47
5.	"For Now"	4:06
6.	"Downtown Love"	4:27
7.	"The Whole of the Moon"	4:36
8.	"Young and the Guilty"	3:34
9.	"Twilight Years"	3:33
10.	"Welcome the Wonderfu"	3:43
11.	"Only the Good Die Young"	3:56
12.	"Keep Reminding Me"	4:42
13.	"I Feel Over Nothing"	4:13
14.	"Goodbye To The Show"	4:02

European release tracklist
No.	Title	Length
1.	"Buckle Up"	4:01
2.	"Antidote"	4:00
3.	"Leave a Light On"	3:59
4.	"Can You Feel It?"	3:33
5.	"Beautiful Life"	3:47
6.	"Like Dynamite"	4:35
7.	"Golden Lion"	3:15
8.	"Downtown Love"	4:27
9.	"Young and the Guilty"	3:34
10.	"I Feel Over Nothing"	4:13
11.	"Side by Side"	3:29
12.	"Only the Good Die Young"	3:56
13.	"Manufactured Kings"	3:45
14.	"Keep Reminding Me"	4:42
15.	"Heat of the Moment"	3:47
16.	"Goodbye To The Show"	4:02

== Personnel ==
Personnel data taken from Ok!Good Records' Bandcamp.

- Kahn Morbee – vocals, guitar
- Neil Pauw – drums
- Glen Hodgson – bass, keyboards, backing vocals
- Paul Hodgson – lead guitar
- Rob Davidson – keyboards
- John Mayer – strings
- Rebecca Taylor – vocals
- Jacques Du Plessis – producer, recorder, mixer
- Adrian Erasmus – assistant producer
- Gavin Flaks – assistant producer
