= Under the Bed 2 =

- Film poster
- Directed by: Yuan Jie
- Release date: August 22, 2014 (China)
- Running time: 88 minutes
- Country: China
- Language: Mandarin
- Box office: US$2.30 million (China)

Under the Bed 2 (Chinese: 床下有人2) is a 2014 Chinese horror suspense thriller film directed by Yuan Jie. It was released on August 22, 2014.

== Plot ==
After the disappearance of a psychiatrist, Dr Zhang (Jiang Wenxuan), his brother brings several friends to the mental hospital where he used to work to look for clues. They discover many unknown and horrifying secrets, including the brutal human experiments conducted by Dr Zhang and the horrifying truths hidden in the depths of the hospital. In the course of exploration, the group begins to encounter various paranormal events one after another, plunging them into a life-and-death crisis. In the end, the real reason for Dr Zhang's disappearance and the shocking secrets hidden inside the asylum are revealed.

== Cast ==
- Abby
- Li Henan
- Chen Yuan
- Song Wei
- Chen Jiamin
- Cynthia
- Li Zhuoyuan
- Zhong Chao

== See also ==
- Under the Bed 3
