= Stardust Galaxies =

Studio album by the Parlotones
- Released: 30 October 2009
- Genre: Indie rock, alternative rock, indie pop
- Length: 45:15
- Label: Sovereign Entertainment

The Parlotones chronology
A World Next Door to Yours (2007)	Stardust Galaxies (2009)	Eavesdropping on the Songs of Whales (2011)

Singles from Stardust Galaxies
- 1. "Life Design" Released: 11 April 2010; 2. "Push Me to the Floor" Released: 27 June 2010; 3. "We Call This Dancing" Released: 5 September 2010; 4. "Stardust Galaxies" Released: 14 September 2010

Professional ratings
Review scores
Source	Rating
iAfrica	4.5/5 stars
Channel24	3/5 stars

Stardust Galaxies is the fourth studio album produced by Johannesburg-based South African rock band the Parlotones. The album has been certified Gold, having sold 20,000 copies in its first week of release. The album was released on 30 October 2009, during the Parlotones' 2009 world tour.

"We Call This Dancing", "Brighter Side of Hell" and 'Welcome to the Weekend' were featured in the American reality TV show, Jersey Shore, during various episodes of Season 3.

== Track listing ==
No.	Title	Length
1.	"Push Me to the Floor"	4:10
2.	"Life Design"	3:26
3.	"Should We Fight Back"	3:14
4.	"Stars Fall Down"	4:21
5.	"We Call This Dancing"	4:01
6.	"Fly to the Moon"	4:00
7.	"Remember When..."	3:52
8.	"Welcome to the Weekend"	3:30
9.	"Brighter Side of Hell"	3:15
10.	"It's Only Science"	3:42
11.	"Fireworks and Waterfalls"	3:46
12.	"Stardust Galaxies" (featuring Zolani Mahola)	3:50
