= Journey Through the Shadows =

Studio album by the Parlotones
- Released: 8 May 2012
- Studio: M3 Studios, Johannesburg
- Genre: Alternative rock
- Length: 38:53
- Label: Sovereign Entertainment
- Producer: Theo Crous

The Parlotones chronology
Eavesdropping on the Songs of Whales (2011)	Journey Through the Shadows (2012)	Stand Like Giants (2013)

Singles from Journey Through the Shadows
- 1. "Save Your Best Bits" Released: 20 April 2012; 2. "Honey Spiders" Released: June 2012

Journey Through the Shadows is the sixth album by South African rock band the Parlotones. It was produced by Theo Crous, and was released on 8 May 2012 by Sovereign Entertainment. They recorded the entire album in 2011 at M3 Studios in Johannesburg. The album includes their successful radio singles, "Save Your Best Bits" and "Honey Spiders".

== Track listing ==
All tracks are written by the Parlotones

No.	Title	Length
1.	"Freakshow"	1:34
2.	"Soul and Body"	3:17
3.	"Brave and Wild"	3:19
4.	"Save Your Best Bits"	3:00
5.	"Goodbyes"	4:02
6.	"Sweet as a Stolen Kiss"	3:51
7.	"Honey Spiders"	3:39
8.	"We Just Wanna Be Loved"	2:50
9.	"Down by the Lake"	2:58
10.	"I am Alive"	4:00
11.	"Sing you to Sleep"	2:56
12.	"Suitcase for a Home"	3:26
Total length:		38:53

== Personnel ==
- Kahn Morbee – lead vocals, rhythm guitar
- Paul Hodgson – lead guitar
- Glen Hodgson – bass guitar, backing vocals
- Neil Pauw – drums
