= A World Next Door to Yours =

Studio album by The Parlotones
- Released: 28 September 2007
- Genre: Indie rock; post-Britpop; alternative rock; post-punk revival
- Label: Sovereign Entertainment; Universal Music

The Parlotones chronology
| Radiocontrolledrobot (2005) | A World Next Door to Yours (2007) | Stardust Galaxies (2009) |

A World Next Door to Yours is the third studio album released by Johannesburg-based South African Indie band The Parlotones under its Sovereign Entertainment label, released on 28 September 2007. The band had a massive album launch party at The Partyhouse at The Dome in Randburg in South Africa.

The first single release from the album in South Africa was "A Giant Mistake" on July 1, 2007. The song reached #1 on 5FM's Top 40 and the Hi5@5 chart shows. In the UK the song "Dragonflies & Astronauts" became their debut UK single.

== Release ==
The album was certified gold in South Africa 3 months after its release and platinum 3 months later. The album remained one of South Africa's top 20 selling albums for more than 12 months and became the biggest selling album of the decade 2000–2010 in South Africa.

== Reception ==
Miles Keylock from News24's entertainment website, Channel24, said that The Parlotones were "Coldplay wannabees" and that this album showed that they were beginning to develop their own sound. He also said that songs from the album were "destined to be played at marriage proposals, wedding receptions, baby showers, birthdays..." The website rated it 4 starts out of 5.

== Track listing ==
| No. | Title | Length |
|---|---|---|
| 1. | "Giant Mistake" | 3:48 |
| 2. | "I’ll Be There" | 3:37 |
| 3. | "I’m Only Human" | 4:01 |
| 4. | "Bird in Flight" | 3:15 |
| 5. | "Sun Comes Out" | 2:55 |
| 6. | "Dance" | 3:26 |
| 7. | "Side of the Moon" | 3:28 |
| 8. | "Play On" | 3:04 |
| 9. | "Solar System" | 4:12 |
| 10. | "Perfect Place" | 3:41 |
| 11. | "Pointing Fingers" | 3:39 |
| 12. | "Window Shopper" | 4:08 |
| 13. | "Disappear Without a Trace" | 4:30 |
| 14. | "Baby Be Mine" | 2:46 |
