= Antiques & Artefacts =

Studio album by The Parlotones
- Released: 12 April 2015
- Studio: Bellville Studios, Cape Town
- Genre: Alternative rock; indie rock; pop rock
- Length: 55:09
- Label: Gallo Record Company
- Producer: Theo Crous

The Parlotones chronology
Stand Like Giants (2013)	Antiques & Artefacts (2015)	Trinkets, Relics & Heirlooms (2016)

Singles from Antiques & Artefacts
- 1. "Defy Gravity" Released: 15 April 2015; 2. "Treasures" Released: 25 January 2016

Antiques & Artefacts is the eighth album by South African rock band The Parlotones. It was produced by Theo Crous, and was released on 12 April 2015 on Gallo. The album was recorded at Bellville Studios in Cape Town. It is their first album after leaving their record label, Sovereign Entertainment, and firing their manager, Raphael Domalik.

== Track listing ==
All tracks are written by The Parlotones

No.	Title	Length
1.	"Whistle Dixie Dizzy"	2:53
2.	"Skeletons"	3:15
3.	"Defy Gravity"	3:12
4.	"We Were Just Having Fun"	4:25
5.	"Stay a While"	3:28
6.	"Electricity"	3:48
7.	"Treasures"	3:36
8.	"My Love Is Absolute"	2:32
9.	"Tiny Tiger"	4:59
10.	"Kings & Queens"	4:10
11.	"Golden Moments"	4:21
12.	"We Will Be Forever Young"	3:41
13.	"Reach Our Dreams"	3:36
14.	"Following You"	2:18
15.	"Skull & Bones"	2:36
16.	"Mysterious"	2:19
Total length:		55:09

== Personnel ==
- Kahn Morbee – lead vocals, rhythm guitar
- Paul Hodgson – lead guitar
- Glen Hodgson – bass guitar, backing vocals
- Neil Pauw – drums
