= Under the Bed 3 =

Under the Bed
- Film poster
- Chinese: 床下有人3
- Directed by: Shang Yongfeng
- Production companies: Shanxi Feiermu Media; Filmoon Pictures; Beijing Dongfang Gedian Media; Zhejiang Dongyang April Day Entertainment; Nanjing Dieyun Media; Beijing Lingle Dongfang Entertainment; Beijing Suiyuan Media; Beijing Yinshi Entertainment
- Distributed by: Zhejiang Dongyang April Day Entertainment
- Release date: March 11, 2016
- Running time: 90 minutes
- Country: China
- Language: Mandarin
- Box office: CN¥6 million

Under the Bed 3 (Chinese: 床下有人3) is a 2016 Chinese horror thriller film directed by Shang Yongfeng. It is the third film of the Under the Bed film series and was released in China by Zhejiang Dongyang April Day Entertainment on March 11, 2016.

== Plot ==
When Wu Zhihao and Ai Jiajia got married, Wang Kun, a childhood friend of Ai Jiajia, sent an old wedding bed as a wedding gift. Since then, Wu Zhihao and Ai Jiajia have no peace of mind. During the day, it is a bed in the human world, and at night, it is a coffin in the underworld. Under the old wedding bed, it seems that there are vengeful spirits walking between the Yin and Yang worlds. Strange creatures often appear under the bed, and the sound of soul-calling appears in the middle of the night, and even the heart-pounding claws of evil spirits appear. With strange phenomena and vengeful spirits appearing, Wu Zhihao and Ai Jiajia fell into a death curse. The evil, vengeful spirits are approaching step by step, and the betrayal and indifference of the people around them make them walk to the lonely, desperate situation of seeking the answer to the mystery alone, on the edge of life and death.

== Cast ==
- Abby Yin as Ai Jiajia
- Jiang Wenxuan as Wu Zhihao
- Miao Qing as Xiaomei
- Liu Liyuan as Ma Xiaoyu
- Song Wei as Xiao Tianxin
- Peng Wu as Wang Kun
- Dan Wang as Xiaochen
- Yuecheng Chen as Qiqi
- Ruitian Ai as Xia

== Reception ==
The film grossed US$0.75 million on its opening weekend in China.

== See also ==
- Under the Bed 2
