= Faulkner (band) =

American alternative rock band

- Origin: New York, NY
- Genres: Alternative rock
- Years active: 2015–present
- Members: Lucas Asher; Dimitri Farougias; Christian Hogan
- Website: http://www.FaulknerMusic.com

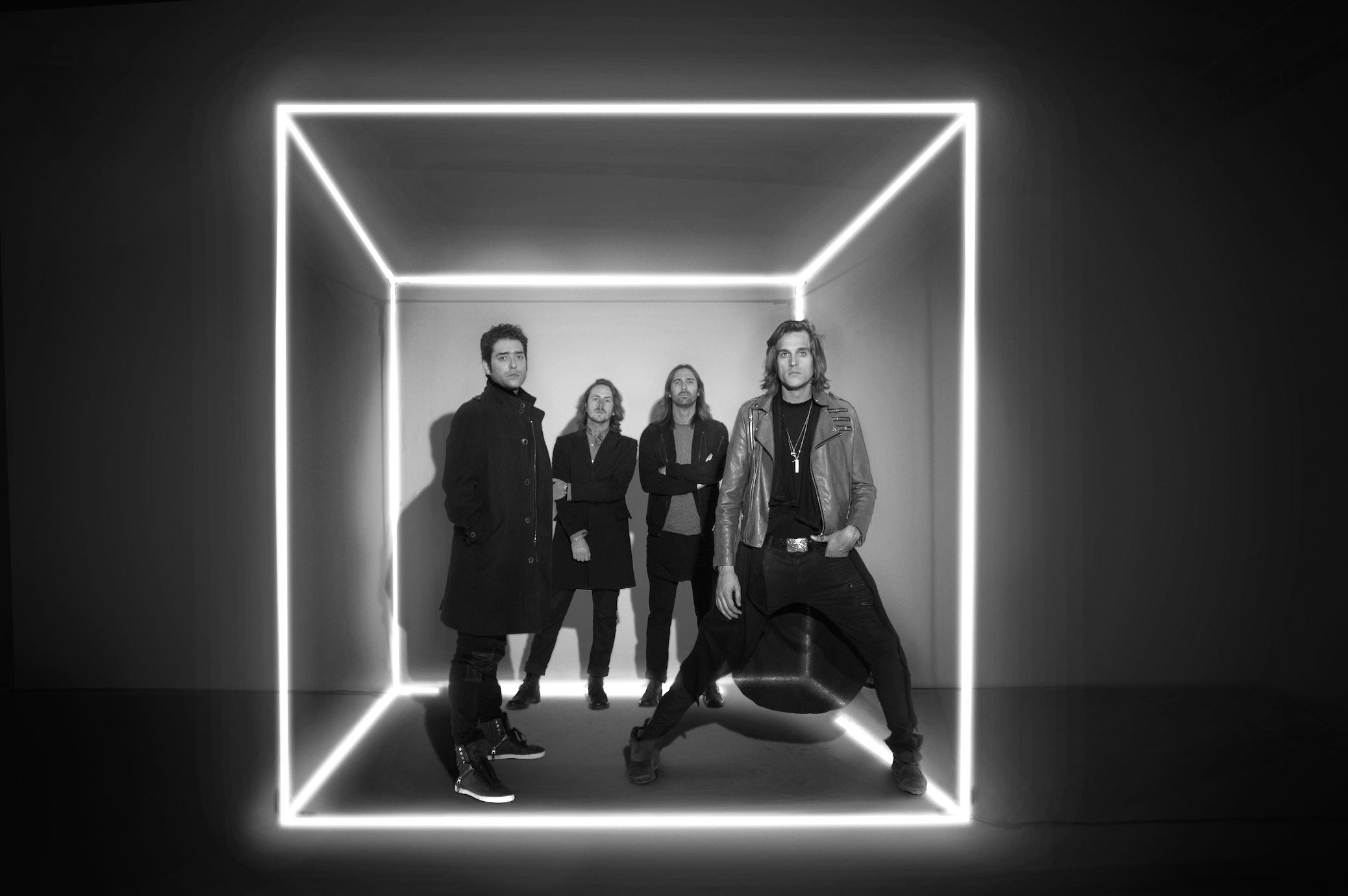
FAULKNER Main Press Photo

Faulkner is an alternative band based in Venice, California with members from New York City, consisting of Lucas Asher (vocals/guitar/Songwriter), Dimitri Farougias (bass), and Christian Hogan (drums).

After posting an online demo, the band attracted the attention of Mark Needham (The Killers), RZA (Wu-Tang Clan), and JP Bowersock (The Strokes) and began work on their debut album.

Wu-Tang Clan member and producer "RZA" co-wrote and produced the mixtape single "NY Anthem", which premiered on ESPN's "Draft Academy." (Asher wrote "NY Anthem" while spending years living on the street in New York City)

The band has also been featured on Los Angeles radio station KROQ, and their single “Revolutionary” has over two million plays on YouTube.

The band's debut EP, “REVANCHIST", was released in March 2018.
