= ToddZero =

- Also known as: Todd 0
- Born: Todd Olivas; August 17, 1971 (age 55)
- Origin: Los Angeles, California
- Genres: Contemporary Christian music, electronica, indie rock, experimental rock
- Occupations: Singer, songwriter
- Instrument: Vocals
- Years active: 2012–present
- Label: Hembot

Todd Olivas (born August 17, 1971), who goes by the stage name ToddZero, formerly, Todd 0, is a Christian musician, who primarily plays a contemporary Christian style of electronica music. His first studio album, Kid Heart, was released in 2013.

== Early life ==
Todd Olivias was born on August 17, 1971.

== Music career ==
His music recording career began in 2012, with the extended play, 1234567, that was independently released. He released, Kid Heart, a studio album, on June 4, 2013, with Hembot Recordings. His song "We Will Win" has appeared on the ABC Family network. And is also the hockey highlights theme song for Los Angeles news station KTLA.

== Discography ==
Studio albums

- My Precious Limp (August 17, 2016, Hembot Recordings)
- Kid Heart (June 4, 2013, Hembot Recordings)

EPs

- "Kid Heart - Bonus EP" (November 1, 2013)
- 1234567 (May 1, 2012, as Todd 0)

Singles

- Dear World (January 1, 2015)

== Discography ==
Year	Album/EP
2012	1234567 EP
2013	Kid Heart
2014	Kid Heart: Bonus EP
2016	My Precious Limp
