= Malea (singer-songwriter) =

American singer

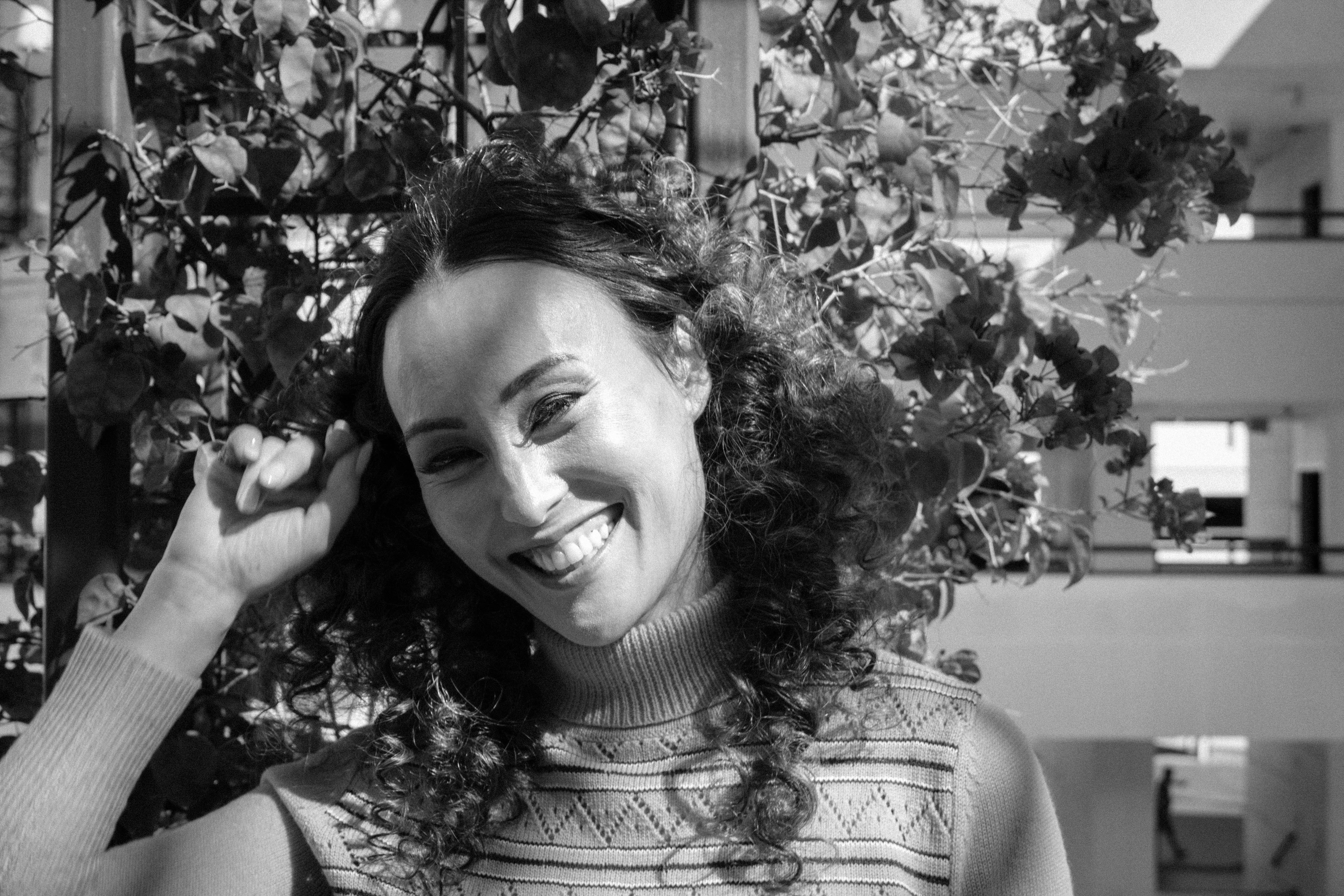

Background information
- Origin: Los Angeles, California, United States
- Occupations: Singer, songwriter
- Instruments: Vocals, guitar
- Years active: 1997–present
- Website: malea.com

Malea is an American film producer, actor, singer, songwriter, and musician. She began her music career in opera, receiving her degree in Opera Performance from the Manhattan School of Music. She understudied and played the role of Tuptim in Broadway revival of The King and I at the Neil Simon Theatre. In 2007, she moved to Los Angeles, where she continued to focus on songwriting, recording and performing music.

As a musician, (under the name Malea) has recorded four albums and toured throughout the United States. She is known for her 2014 single "Give", which reached the Billboard Top 20 Dance Club Songs chart in 2014. In 2015, her song "One Hot Mess" went to number one on the Billboard Dance Club charts.

Malea's acting roles include an on-screen performance in the 2018 biographic film Frank & Ava, about the lives of Frank Sinatra and Ava Gardner
