= Stand Like Giants =

Studio album by the Parlotones
- Released: 1 September 2013
- Genre: Alternative rock
- Length: 45:53
- Label: Sovereign Entertainment
- Producer: Theo Crous

The Parlotones chronology
Journey Through the Shadows (2012)	Stand Like Giants (2013)	Antiques & Artefacts (2015)

Singles from Stand Like Giants
- 1. "Sleepwalker" Released: 29 August 2013

Stand Like Giants is the seventh album by South African rock band the Parlotones. It was produced by Theo Crous, and was released on 1 September 2013 on Sovereign Entertainment. It includes their hit radio single, "Sleepwalker".

== Track listing ==
All tracks are written by The Parlotones and Theo Crous. Nic Olsen additional lyrics on "Sympathise with the cost". Lyrics of "Hollow Men" inspired by T.S. Eliot poem. (as per liner notes)

No.	Title	Length
1.	"Shake It Up"	3:15
2.	"Never Stand Alone"	3:45
3.	"Spellbound"	2:59
4.	"Sleepwalker" (featuring Khuli Chana)	3:35
5.	"Slow Assassination"	3:49
6.	"Sympathise With The Cost"	3:07
7.	"Stand Like Giants"	4:42
8.	"Lazy Sunny Days"	3:00
9.	"Songs Of Whales"	3:57
10.	"Chinese Vase"	4:11
11.	"Powerful"	3:47
12.	"Hollow Men"	2:36
13.	"Follow Your Bliss"	3:10
Total length:		49:08

== Personnel ==
- Kahn Morbee – lead vocals, rhythm guitar
- Paul Hodgson – lead guitar
- Glen Hodgson – bass guitar, backing vocals
- Neil Pauw – drums
