= Under the Bed (album) =

Studio album by Josh and the Empty Pockets
- Released: January 2, 2008
- Genre: Pop/rock
- Label: 8th Impression
- Producer: Rick Fritz, Chris G.

Under the Bed is the 2008 debut album by Josh and the Empty Pockets. In an interview with Phil Ponce on Chicago Tonight, Josh explains that the debut album is about growing up and that the title Under the Bed comes from the lyrics “where have the monsters under my bed gone” on one of the album's songs. The album was critically well received, and its tracks were featured on several television programs on Nickelodeon TV channel. In support of the album, the band released a single, "Fall Right Now", which reached #11 on the FMQB Adult Contemporary Chart.

== Critical response ==
In an April, 2009, Daily Vault review of Under the Bed, Duke Egbert wrote "Under The Bed is tight, melodic, layered, harmony-drenched rock/pop, and one of the better new CDs I've heard this year. ... Besides the aforementioned 'Fall Right Now' and 'Freedom To Me,' I particularly liked the wordplay of 'Missteps,' 'Side Effects,' and 'Monsters,' all of which are both great pop songs and lyrical tours-de-force. Josh and the Empty Pockets have a bright future. They play intelligent, well-crafted pop/rock with substance that still manages to not get bogged down in its own importance."

In his review of the album, Michael Capozzoli, Jr., former writer for Billboard magazine, describes Josh as "a young recording artist who writes and sings as if he is already an old master of the pop/rock genre. This singer/songwriter/recording artist and his band are THE BAND to watch in 2009." Echoing the sentiments of prior reviews, Amy Lotsberg, a music critic and producer of Collected Sounds, writes about Josh and the band that he "has a pleasing voice. It’s clear, and easy to understand; which is important because the lyrics are clever. The songs are melodic and interesting and they’re obviously talented musicians that work well together. All their songs are pretty radio friendly, but I’d say Let Go and Side Effects are standouts." In his October, 2009, Illinois Entertainer review, Terrence Flamm describes the album as "fun rock ‘n’ roll."

== Fall Right Now ==
As part of that release, the band promoted the single "Fall Right Now" to medium and secondary markets and reached #11 on the FMQB Adult Contemporary Chart.

The band also recorded an acoustic version of "Fall Right Now" at the world famous recording studio Sweetwater included with a second previously unrecorded song called "Leaving Jackson" on WAJI's annual charity CD, a fundraising project for the Riley Hospital for Children in Indianapolis.

== Track listing ==
All tracks composed by Josh and the Empty Pockets.

1. "Meaningless Words" – 4:02
2. "Monsters" – 3:04
3. "Missteps" – 3:45
4. "Fall Right Now" (Album version) – 4:09
5. "Freedom to Me" – 2:35
6. "Beautiful to Me" – 4:34
7. "Side Effects" – 2:58
8. "I Don't Wanna Know" – 3:09
9. "Let Go" – 3:17
10. "You're the One" – 3:53
11. "Fall Right Now" (Radio edit) – 3:26

== Personnel ==
- Rick Fritz – producer, engineer, mastering, mixing
- Chris G. – producer, engineer
- Rick Parma. Rickparma.com – saxophone
- Josh Solomon – guitar, vocals
- Jake Westermann – engineer, mastering, mixing
