= Alexa Wilkinson =

American singer-songwriter

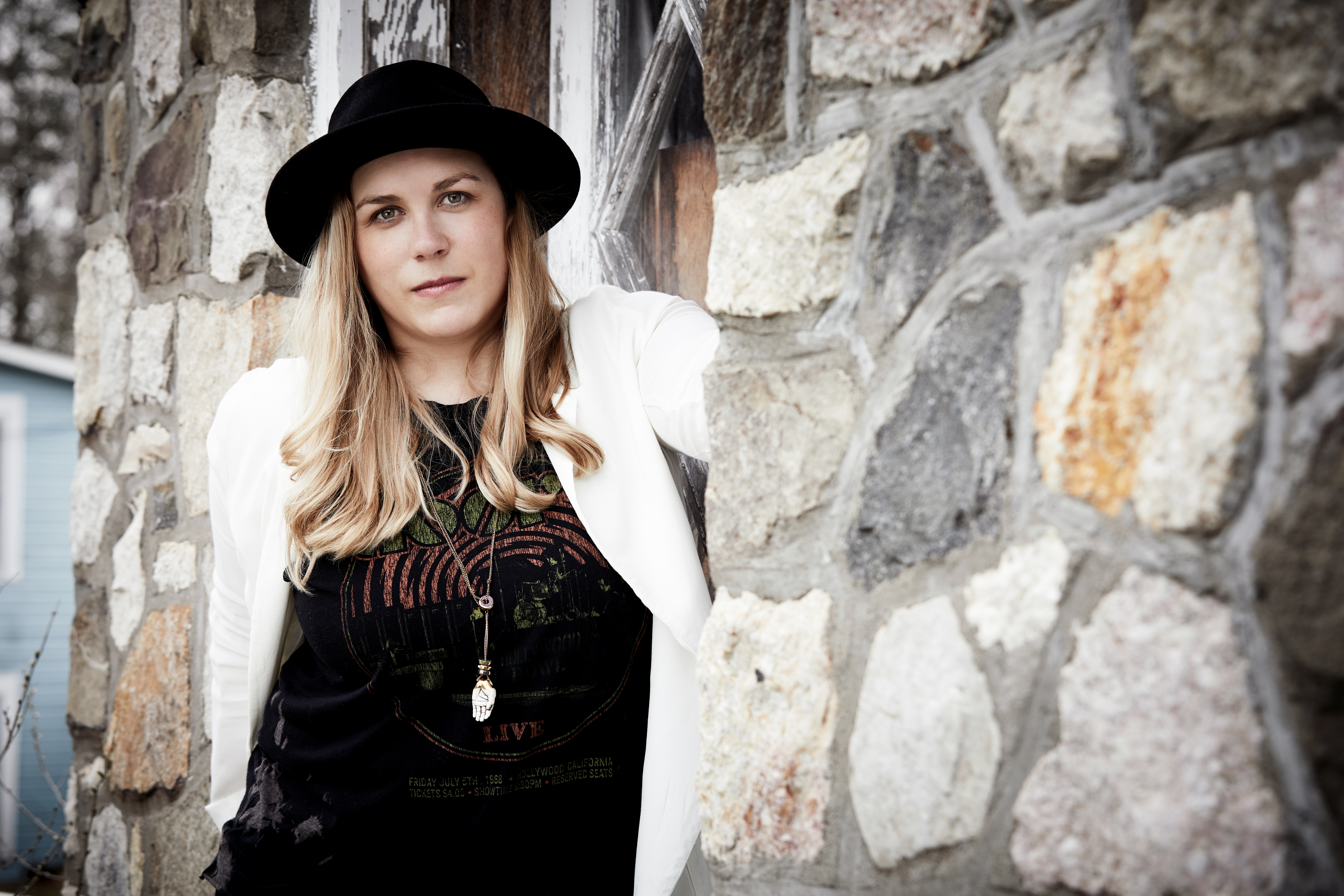

Background information
- Born: Alexa Blair Wilkinson; May 15, 1987 (age 39); Cherry Hill, New Jersey, U.S.
- Origin: Park City, Utah, U.S.
- Genres: Americana, alternative rock, pop, folk, jazz
- Occupations: Singer-songwriter, musician, photojournalist
- Instruments: Acoustic guitar, trumpet, vocals
- Years active: 2006–present
- Labels: DNK Records, Imperfect Partners
- Website: www.mothersdaughterband.com

Alexa Blair Wilkinson (born May 15, 1987) is an American singer-songwriter, guitarist and trumpet player. As a solo artist from 2006 to 2011, Alexa recorded two full-length albums, and one EP. They were briefly a member of the band, "Mother's Daughter" with Jessie Standafer from 2019-2022. While solo, Alexa toured with a number of indie musicians, including Josh Kelley, Ingrid Michaelson, Joshua Radin, Jonathan Clay, Vanessa Carlton and Kate Voegele. Alexa Wilkinson's song, 'Miles Away' was featured on MTV's The Hills.

== Biography ==
Alexa Wilkinson, who is non-binary, was born in Cherry Hill, New Jersey but moved to Park City, Utah at age 12. They began playing the trumpet at age 10, after being convinced to do so by a childhood sweetheart, and took up the acoustic guitar a year later. Alexa graduated from Park City High School before taking up music as a full-time career.

Alexa Wilkinson was "discovered" by Josh Kelley in 2006 after a chance meeting with Josh's then girlfriend and now wife, Katherine Heigl. Josh signed them to his independent record label, DNK Records and cowrote several songs with Alexa. In June 2007, aged 20, Alexa released their debut album, Lullaby Appetite. Many of the songs on Lullaby Appetite were taken from the apparently independently released album Just You Wait (2006).

Alexa's second album, Lions, was released in April 2008. The first single off the album is 'Vanilla Rain' (for which a video has been made). The title track "Lions" has been featured on CSI NY (Episode 512 "She's Not There"), as well as "Lullaby Appetite" featured on ABC Family's Make It or Break It.

After touring 2008–2009 with Joshua Radin, Ingrid Michaelson, and Vanessa Carlton, Alexa left DNK Records to pursue an independent career. They then recorded their third EP, "Mechanical Circles" With producer Dave Pittenger in 2011 before taking a step down from music in 2012.

Alexa has since come out as queer, and was briefly a member of the band Mother's Daughter, a collaborative project by Jessie Standafer & Alexa Wilkinson. Their music fuses traditional Americana roots with modern live production. They've performed at Rockwood Music Hall concerts, the National Women's Music Festival, and venues around the country. The singer-songwriter duo also play acoustic guitar, percussion, piano/keys/MIDI, trumpet, and ukulele in their songs.

They have released four singles since January 2020, with their latest single "Give It Time". All proceeds from “Give It Time” went to the Black Banjo Reclamation Project, a vehicle to return instruments of African origin to the descendants of their original makers.

== Band ==
Alexa Wilkinson's band is currently a member of "Mother's Daughter"

Mother's Daughter is a collaborative project by Jessie Standafer & Alexa Wilkinson. Their music fuses traditional Americana roots with modern live production, tight vocal harmonies, and lyrics that deal with past and future. They've performed at Rockwood Music Hall concerts, the National Women's Music Festival, and venues around the country. The singer-songwriter duo also play acoustic guitar, percussion, piano/keys/MIDI, trumpet, and ukulele in their songs.

== Solo discography ==
- Lullaby Appetite
- Lions
- Just You Wait (2006)
- Lullaby Appetite (2007, DNK Records)
- Lions (2008, DNK Records)

== Mother's Daughter discography ==
- Boundaries - Single (2020)
- Focus - Single (2020)
- You Bring The Sun - Single (2020)
- Give It Time - Single (2020)
