= Episoda =

Studio album by the Parlotones
- Released: 3 December 2003
- Recorded: September–October 2003
- Studio: Andrew Lester Studio, Johannesburg
- Genre: Indie rock; post-Britpop
- Length: 49:08
- Label: Sovereign Entertainment
- Producer: Andrew Lester

The Parlotones chronology
Episoda (2003)	Radiocontrolledrobot (2005)

Singles from Episoda
- 1. "Long Way Home" Released: 2004

Episoda is the debut album by South African rock band the Parlotones. It was produced by Andrew Lester, and was released on 8 December 2003 on Sovereign Entertainment. The album was recorded during September–October 2003 at Andrew Lester's home studio in Johannesburg; the band paid R 12,000 (equivalent to $2,791 in 2024).

Episoda includes The Parlotones's first radio single, "Long Way Home". The album's release was followed by the group's first regional tour of South Africa.

== Track listing ==
All tracks are written by The Parlotones

No.	Title	Length
1.	"Big Fright"	3:31
2.	"Swallow This"	3:32
3.	"Long Way Home"	3:43
4.	"Saturday Night"	2:55
5.	"Falling Awake"	3:54
6.	"Invincible"	2:49
7.	"Loud And Clear"	5:59
8.	"Inside"	4:08
9.	"Echo"	3:45
10.	"Overrated"	4:00
11.	"Where Do We Go From Here"	6:12
12.	"Easier Said Than Done"	4:40
Total length:		49:08

== Personnel ==
- Kahn Morbee – lead vocals, rhythm guitar
- Paul Hodgson – lead guitar
- Glen Hodgson – bass guitar, backing vocals
- Neil Pauw – drums
- John Boyd – synth
