= Radiocontrolledrobot =

Studio album by The Parlotones
- Released: 20 July 2005
- Genre: Alternative rock; indie rock; post-Britpop; post-punk revival
- Length: 61:19
- Label: Sovereign Entertainment; Universal

The Parlotones chronology
Episoda (2003)	Radiocontrolledrobot (2005)	A World Next Door to Yours (2007)

International Cover

Singles from Radiocontrolledrobot
- 1. "Overexposed" Released: 23 March 2008

Professional ratings
Review scores
Source	Rating
Hot Press	6.5/10 stars

Radiocontrolledrobot is the second studio album released by Johannesburg-based South African Indie rock band The Parlotones under its Sovereign Entertainment label. It was produced by Dave Birch at Tropical Sweat Studios in Durban, South Africa. A shorter version of the album (comprising 12 tracks instead of 18) was released internationally in 2007, making it the first international album released by the band. The album also won the best album of the year at the 2006 South Africa Music Awards.

The first single from the album is "Colourful". The single "Overexposed" was used as the theme song for FHM World's Hottest Woman short film. A TV commercial for Fujifilm in Ireland featured the track "Beautiful".

== Track listing ==
All tracks are written by The Parlotones

No.	Title	Length
1.	"Louder Than Bombs"	3:33
2.	"Overexposed"	2:19
3.	"Rock.Paper.Scissors"	3:09
4.	"Colourful"	3:23
5.	"Dragonflies and Astronauts"	2:58
6.	"Radiocontrolledrobot"	4:14
7.	"Interlude (The Impossible)"	3:34
8.	"No Place to Hide"	3:36
9.	"Dangerous"	3:55
10.	"Funny Face"	3:29
11.	"Martyr"	3:28
12.	"Scary"	3:17
13.	"Silence"	3:40
14.	"Motivated"	2:43
15.	"Beautiful"	3:49
16.	"Pretend"	3:04
17.	"Tiny"	3:46
18.	"Here Comes a Man" (written by Boom Boom Room)	4:02
Total length:		61:19

== International release ==
All tracks are written by The Parlotones

No.	Title	Length
1.	"Louder Than Bombs"	3:33
2.	"Overexposed"	2:19
3.	"Beautiful"	3:49
4.	"Radiocontrolledrobot"	4:14
5.	"Dragonflies and Astronauts"	2:58
6.	"Colourful"	3:23
7.	"Interlude (The Impossible)"	3:34
8.	"Pretend"	3:04
9.	"Rock.Paper.Scissors"	3:09
10.	"Martyr"	3:28
11.	"Here Comes a Man" (written by Boom Boom Room)	4:02
12.	"Tiny"	3:46
Total length:		41:22

== Music videos ==
- Dragonflies & Astronauts is the second video made by the band. It was made with the help of Claudio Pavan and Fiction Factory. The video took nine months to create and is completely animated.
