= The Parlotones =

South African rock band

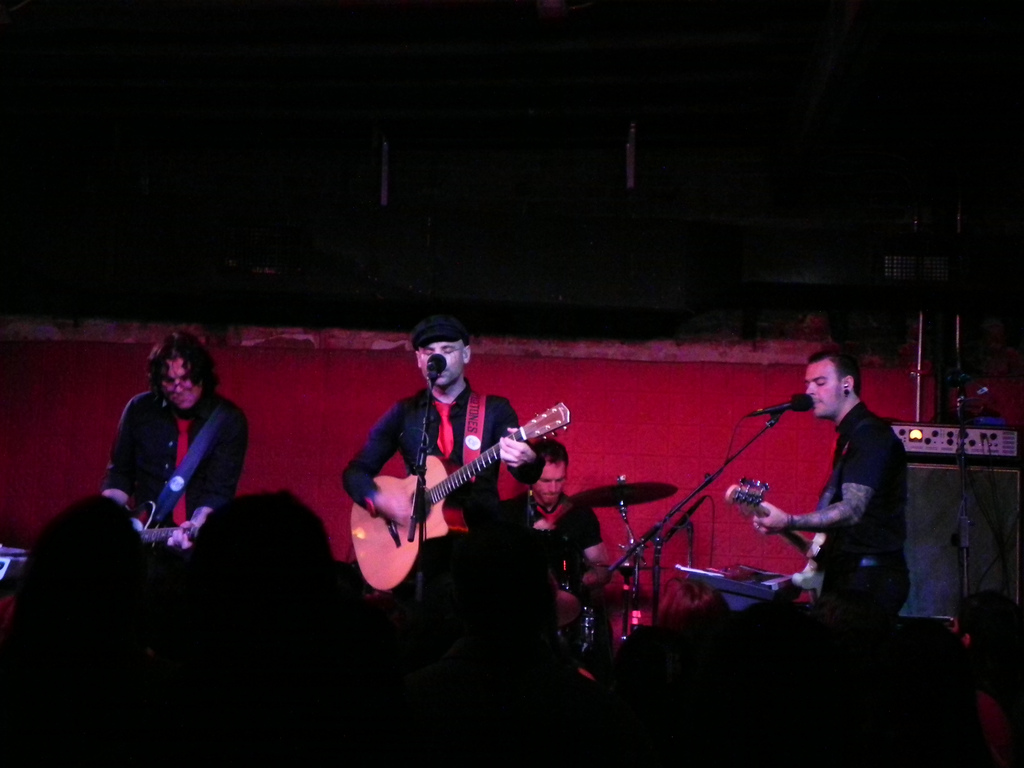
- The Parlotones performing in 2011

Background information
- Origin: Johannesburg, South Africa
- Genres: Alternative rock; indie rock; post-Britpop; post-punk revival; pop rock; new wave
- Years active: 1998–present
- Labels: Sovereign Entertainment; Universal; Gallo Records
- Members: Kahn Morbee; Neil Pauw; Glen Hodgson; Paul Hodgson; Rob Davidson
- Website: theparlotones.co.za

The Parlotones are a South African indie rock band hailing from Johannesburg, formed in 1998. The ensemble features Kahn Morbee on vocals and rhythm guitar, Paul Hodgson as lead guitarist, Glen Hodgson handling bass guitar, keyboards, and backing vocals, and Neil Pauw on drums and percussion. Originally rooted in Britpop, The Parlotones' music has evolved to encompass a diverse range of genres, with lyrics centered on relatable themes such as love and everyday life, complemented by engaging and memorable melodies.

Within just four years of formation, The Parlotones signed with Sovereign Entertainment and released their debut album, Episoda. As one of South Africa's all-time best-selling music artists, the band boasts ten studio albums and multi-platinum success. They have received nine South African Music Awards and, in 2009, made history as the first South African band to headline at the Coca-Cola Dome. The Parlotones actively support various philanthropic initiatives, including The Little Wing Music Foundation, the Anene Booysen Foundation, and the Africa-Unite campaign.

== History ==
=== Formation and early years (1998–2002) ===
The Parlotones originated in Johannesburg during the summer of 1998 when Kahn Morbee (born Dingaan) failed to form a band in high school. He later enrolled at the University of Johannesburg, where he met Neil Pauw, who had attended the same high school in Roodepoort. After recognizing their shared musical vision upon hearing Morbee's original songs, the duo decided to form a band. Morbee subsequently met Paul Hodgson at university after they were both removed from the campus library for playing guitar. The next day, Morbee invited Paul to join the band. At the time, Paul's younger brother, Glen Hodgson, was still in high school but was asked to join as a bassist. Their early sound drew inspiration from The Smiths, The Cure, and R.E.M., with Kahn describing their initial sound as "punkish and squeaky". They chose the punk-influenced band name "Crayon".

In July 2002, well-known underground musician John Boyd joined the band, contributing synth elements and serving as the on-stage engineer during live shows. Around this time, the band signed with Raphael Domalik's record label, Sovereign Entertainment, prompting them to adopt a more mature name. They settled on The Parlotones, a variation of Parlophone Records, the label that signed influential bands such as Radiohead, Travis, and Jeff Buckley.

=== Episoda, Borderline Patrol, and University Radio (2003–2005) ===
"We had a great time in Andrew’s studio and I think you can hear it if you listen to the album. It was quite a rough recording and definitely doesn’t sound as polished as the later albums we recorded. We experimented with a lot of things that were new concepts to us."

— Paul Hodgson, on recording Episoda

By 2003, The Parlotones had gained prominence in the Johannesburg underground music scene, attracting a small but loyal fanbase. John Boyd introduced the band to Andrew Lester, lead singer of 57, who had built his own home studio and produced his band's debut album. The band agreed to record a full-length album with Andrew for R 12,000 (equivalent to $2,858 in 2025), pooling their resources to cover the cost when their record label could not. After a month, they released Episoda, which received praise from fellow bands and fans.

Initially, the album did not appeal to national radio stations like 5FM due to its perceived lack of commercial potential and "definitely too weird for mainstream radio" sound, as Paul explained. However, university radio stations embraced the album, giving it high rotation and featuring it as a regular top download on local music websites. Regional stations like Highveld and East Coast Radio added the song "Long Way Home" to their playlists, turning it into an instant crowd-pleaser. This moderate success led to the band performing at regional music festivals and making guest appearances on television shows such as Jip and Good Morning Live.

During this period, John Boyd decided to retire from music and pursue a career in marketing. The Parlotones went on to record and release a second EP, Borderline Patrol, in late 2004. The EP gained favorable reception from national radio stations, with their first hit single "Beautiful" charting successfully on 5FM. This was closely followed by their second single "Here Comes a Man", a Boom Boom Room cover, which entered the Top 20. In April 2005, at a celebration for Cosmopolitan South Africa's twenty-one years of publishing, The Parlotones were invited to perform alongside eight other bands.

In an effort to "stand out and be remembered" and to align with the party theme "vintage glam," Kahn suggested that the band apply A Clockwork Orange-inspired teardrops using mascara. Kahn later spoke about his desire for a "trademark," citing influences like "Robert Smith's lipstick [and] Morrissey's quiff." The mascara teardrops would become a signature element of the band's appearance during this time.

=== RadioControlledRobot and Mainstream Success (2005–2009) ===
The Parlotones' second album, Radiocontrolledrobot, released in July 2005 through Sovereign Entertainment, brought them mainstream success. Produced by Dave Birch at Tropical Sweat Studios in Durban, South Africa, the album won the "Best Rock Album" award at the 2006 South African Music Awards. The ballad "Beautiful" was featured in an Irish Fujifilm TV commercial, leading to a European license deal with Universal Music. The album achieved Gold status in 2007. Their next album, A World Next Door to Yours, released in September 2007, became the best-selling South African rock album of the decade. The band signed with Universal Music.

The Parlotones served as spokespeople for both Live Earth and Earth Hour, joining the likes of Archbishop Emeritus Desmond Tutu, Prince Charles, and Rihanna. They released their third album, Stardust Galaxies, in October 2009, which also enjoyed commercial success. The album featured the singles "Life Design" and "Push Me to the Floor," which gained significant airplay on South African radio stations.

=== Journey Through the Shadows and Stand Like Giants (2010–2014) ===
The Parlotones gained traction in Europe when their music video for "Life Design," a single from their third studio album Stardust Galaxies, was featured on MTV Europe. In 2009, the band performed at the Midem Talent Showcase in Cannes, France, where they met American band Blue October. This encounter led to an invitation for the Parlotones to open for Blue October during their Approaching Normal album's Pick Up the Phone Tour. This successful partnership resulted in several subsequent headlining US tours for the Parlotones.

The Parlotones participated in the 2010 FIFA World Cup Kick-Off Celebration concert, performing alongside artists such as the Black Eyed Peas, Alicia Keys, and Shakira. They also recorded a song titled "Stardust Galaxies" with Zolani Mahola, lead singer of Freshlyground.

The band produced an original rock theatre production, Dragonflies and Astronauts, which was broadcast live in 3D via DIRECTV and in 2D on Facebook. The 3D broadcast was well received in the United States, leading to 100 re-airings, while more than half of the worldwide viewership on Facebook came from the US. The production featured songs from the band's catalog, including 16 South African Top 40 hits.

Their song "Rock Paper Scissors" was featured on the popular American TV series One Tree Hill. In October 2011, the Parlotones opened for Coldplay during their concerts in Cape Town and Johannesburg.

In February 2012, the band was introduced to radio programmers, music supervisors, and other industry executives at Michele Clark's Sunset Sessions event in San Diego, CA. They also showcased at the South by Southwest festival in March 2012, leading to their song "Honey" charting on the Triple-A radio format. The Parlotones participated in the Sunset Sessions Rock event in June 2012, and Michele Clark subsequently became their US manager, featuring in their movie "This is Our Story."

In September 2012, the band announced their official move to Los Angeles, California. They relocated to the US in January 2013, playing two sold-out farewell shows at Kirstenbosch National Botanical Garden and Ellis Park Stadium before their departure. Their first performance after the move was at The Viper Room in Los Angeles. The Parlotones continued to tour the US, achieving success with radio and music supervisors.

=== Trinkets, Relics & Heirlooms and China (2016–2020) ===
In 2014, The Parlotones participated in the Sunset Sessions and SXSW industry festivals. They later toured Europe before returning to South Africa. After a 12-year partnership with Sovereign Entertainment, the band announced their departure from their record label and South African manager on 10 July 2014.

Unfortunately, later that year, all touring was postponed due to lead singer Kahn Morbee's vocal cord complications, which required surgery. The band resumed touring in 2015, promoting their new album Antiques & Artifacts with a 21-concert South African tour from April to May. In September 2015, Morbee became a coach for the South African version of The Voice.

The band continued to release new music, including the 2016 album Trinkets, Relics and Heirlooms and the 2017 live album Orchestrated. In 2018, they released their tenth studio album China, which saw international release the following year. The album, which featured a "new, yet familiar sound," included singles such as "Can You Feel It?" and "Beautiful Life."

Throughout 2019, The Parlotones embarked on "The Unplugged(Ish) Tour" across South Africa, promoting their compilation album Something Old, Something New, Something Borrowed, Something Blue. They were nominated for the 23rd South African Music Awards for their album Trinkets, Relics & Heirlooms in the categories of Best Rock Album and Best Duo or Group of the Year.

=== Strike the Harp (2020–present) ===
On 11 December 2020, The Parlotones released a Christmas album titled Strike the Harp. It features 10 tracks, including original songs and classic holiday covers. It was produced by Theo Crous and recorded at Bellville Studios in Cape Town.

The album received positive reviews, with critics praising the band's unique take on classic Christmas songs and the quality of their original tracks. The lead single, "A Parlotones Christmas", was well received by fans and received significant airplay on South African radio stations during the holiday season.

In an interview with Jacaranda FM, Kahn Morbee stated that the album was inspired by the band's desire to spread joy during a difficult year. He also discussed the challenges of recording during the COVID-19 pandemic and the band's excitement to perform the songs live once it was safe to do so.

== Awards and nominations ==
Award	Year	Category	Nominated work	Result
South African Music Awards	2006	Best Rock Album	Radiocontrolledrobot	Won
YOU Magazine Awards	2007	Best Band	The Parlotones	Won
FHM Reader's Choice (South Africa)	2007	Best Band	The Parlotones	Won
MK89 Awards	2007	Best Video	"Beautiful"	Nominated
RESFest	2007	Best Video	"Beautiful"	Nominated
Caxton's Best of Joburg	2007	Best Band	The Parlotones	Won
People's Choice Awards (South Africa)	2008	Best Music Act	The Parlotones	Won
The Loeries	2008	Craft Award	"I'll Be There"	Won
MTV Africa Awards	2008	Best Group	The Parlotones	Nominated
MTV Africa Awards	2008	Best Alternative	The Parlotones	Nominated
International Songwriting Competition	2008	Music Video	"Overexposed"	1
International Songwriting Competition	2008	Performance	"Giant Mistake"	2
International Songwriting Competition	2008	Music Video	"I'll Be There"	Honourable Mention
MK Awards	2009	Best Video	"I'll Be There"	Won
MK Awards	2009	Best Animation	"I'll Be There"	Won
MK Awards	2009	Best Serenade	"I'll Be There"	Won
South African Music Awards	2009	Best Music Video	"Overexposed"	Won
South African Music Awards	2009	Record of the Year	"I'll Be There"	Nominated
South African Music Awards	2009	Best Global Chart DVD	Unplugged	Nominated
International Songwriting Competition	2009	Music Video	"Push Me to the Floor"	2
International Songwriting Competition	2009	Rock	"Life Design"	Honourable Mention
International Songwriting Competition	2009	Music Video	"Life Design"	Honourable Mention
South African Music Awards	2010	Record of the Year	"Push Me to the Floor"	Nominated
South African Music Awards	2010	Best Rock Album: English	Stardust Galaxies	Won
South African Music Awards	2010	Best Music Video	"Push Me to the Floor"	Won
International Songwriting Competition	2010	Rock	"Life Design"	1
International Songwriting Competition	2010	Music Video	"Life Design"	Honourable Mention
International Songwriting Competition	2010	Music Video	"Stars Fall Down"	2
International Songwriting Competition	2010	Adult Album Alternative	"Stars Fall Down"	Honourable Mention
International Songwriting Competition	2010	Performance	"We Call This Dancing"	Honourable Mention
International Songwriting Competition	2010	Adult Contemporary	"Remember When"	Honourable Mention
South African Music Awards	2011	Best Music Video	"Stars Fall Down"	Won
South African Music Awards	2011	Best Music Video	"Life Design"	Nominated
South African Music Awards	2011	Best Selling DVD	Live Design	Won
South African Music Awards	2011	Best Global Chart DVD	Live Design	Won
South African Music Awards	2011	Best Rock Album: English	Live Design	Nominated
South African Music Awards	2012	Best Music Video	"It's Magic"	Won
International Songwriting Competition	2012	Music Video	"Honey Spiders"	1
International Songwriting Competition	2012	Adult Album Alternative	"Honey Spiders"	Honourable Mention
South African Music Awards	2013	Best Music Video	"Honey Spiders"	Won
South African Music Awards	2013	Best Live DVD	Dragonflies and Astronauts	Nominated
MTV Africa Awards	2014	Best Alternative	The Parlotones	Nominated
South African Music Awards	2014	Music Video of the Year	"Sleepwalker"	Won
South African Music Awards	2014	Best Rock Album	Stand Like Giants	Nominated
South African Music Awards	2014	Best Collaboration	"Sleepwalker"	Nominated
South African Music Awards	2014	Duo or Group of the Year	The Parlotones	Nominated
South African Music Awards	2017	Best Rock Album	Trinkets, Relics & Heirlooms	Nominated
South African Music Awards	2017	Best Duo or Group of the Year	Trinkets, Relics & Heirlooms	Nominated
South African Music Awards	2019	Best Rock Album	China	Nominated
South African Music Awards	2019	Best Music Video	"Beautiful Life"	Nominated

== Wine brand ==
On 16 September 2009, The Parlotones together with Hands on Wine released a red wine, "Giant Mistake", named after their single from the album A World Next Door to Yours. The wine is a blend of Cabernet Sauvignon (54%), Shiraz (23%), Pinotage (12%), and Cabernet Franc (11%).

In April 2010 a white wine, "Push Me to the Floor", was released, named after their single from the album Stardust Galaxies. The wine is a blend of Chenin blanc (60%), Gewürztraminer (15%), Chardonnay (20%,) and Viognier (5%).

On 5 October 2010 a rosé called "We Call This Dancing" was released, named after the song from Stardust Galaxies. The wine is a blend of Wellington Pinotage (55%), Wellington Shiraz (25%), and a balance – a blend of 30 different varietals from the Upper Hemel-en-Aarde Valley near Hermanus (20%).

== Band members ==
Principal members

- Kahn Morbee – lead vocals, rhythm guitar (1998–present)
- Paul Hodgson – lead guitar, keyboards (1998–present)
- Glen Hodgson – bass guitar, piano, backing vocals (1998–present)
- Neil Pauw – drums, percussion (1998–present)
- Rob Davidson – keyboards (2018–present)

Early members

- John Boyd – synth, sound effects (2002–2004)
Current line-up
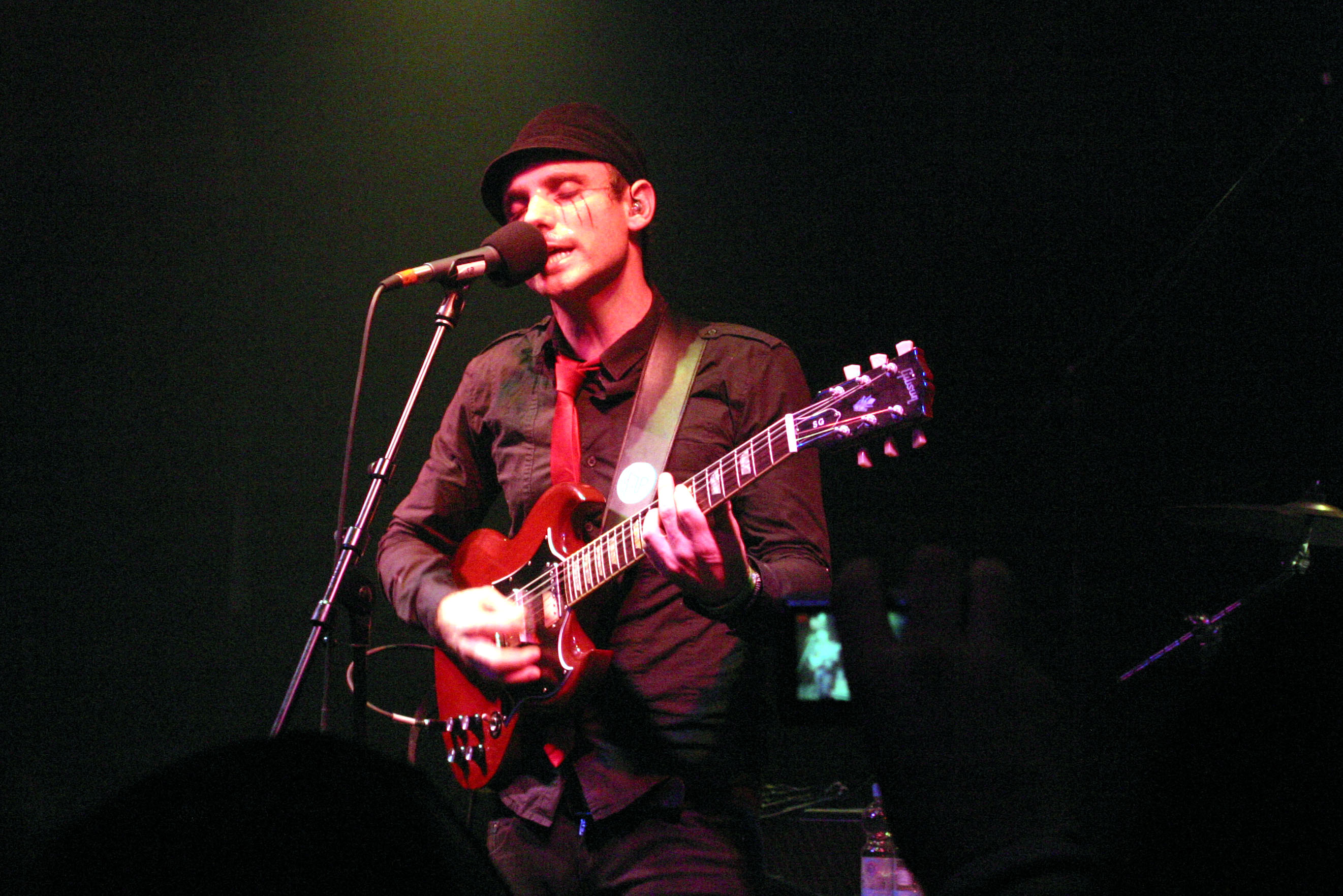
Kahn Morbee (2010)

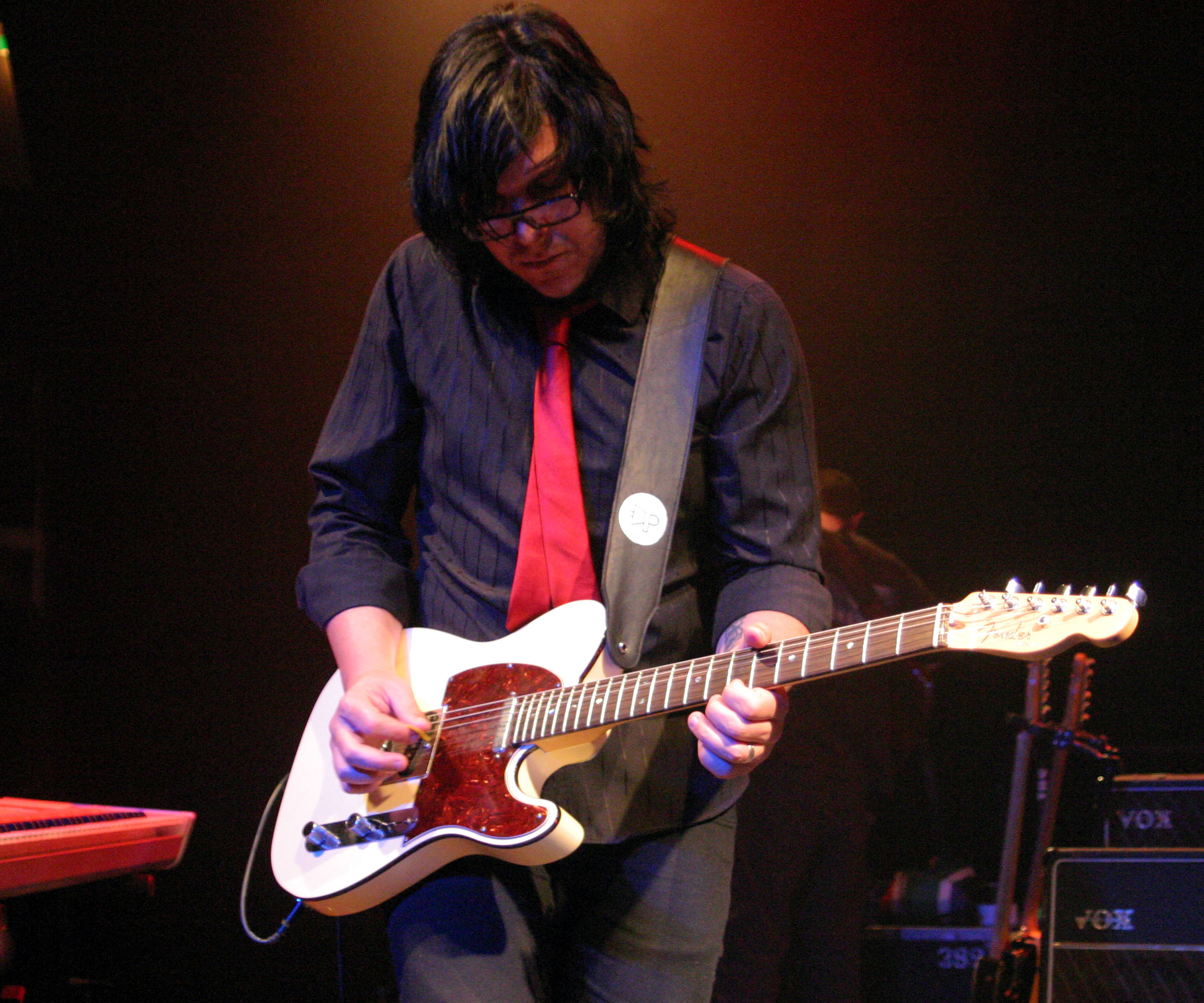
Paul Hodgson (2010)

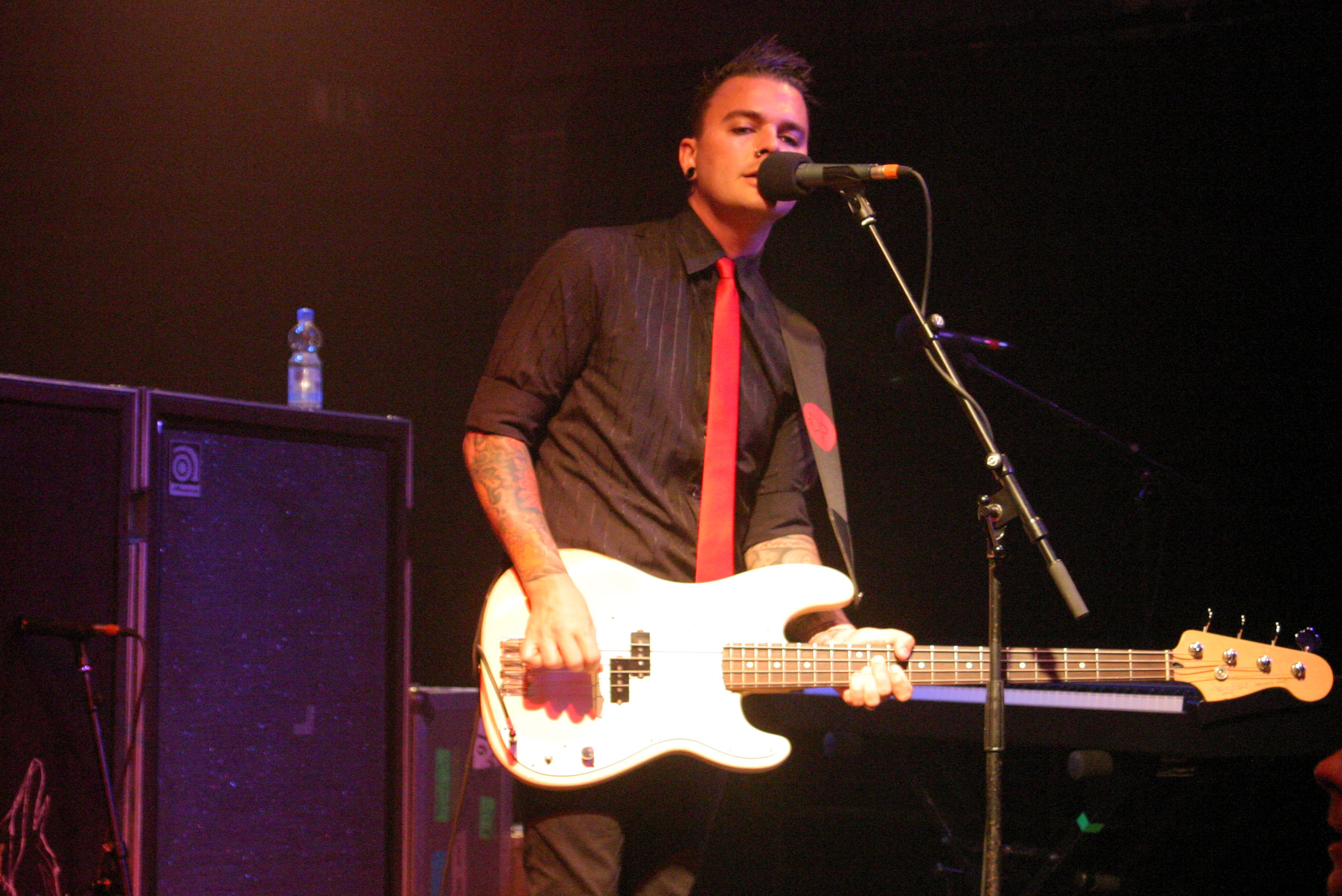
Glen Hodgson (2010)

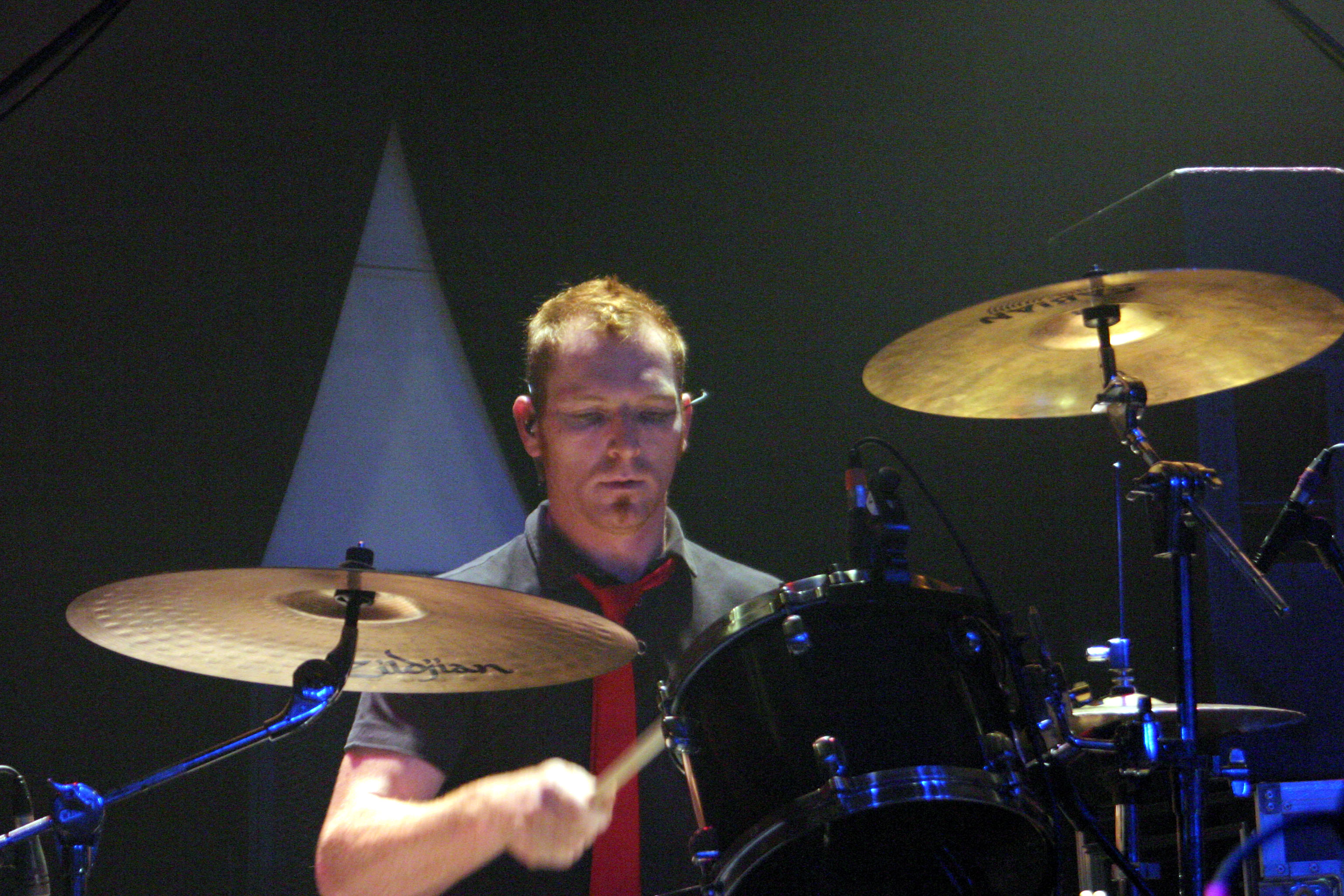
Neil Pauw (2010)

== Discography ==
Studio albums

- Episoda (Sovereign Entertainment, 2003)
- Radiocontrolledrobot (Sovereign Entertainment, 2005)
- A World Next Door to Yours (Sovereign Entertainment, 2007)
- Stardust Galaxies (Sovereign Entertainment, 2009)
- Eavesdropping on the Songs of Whales (Sovereign Entertainment, 2011)
- Journey Through the Shadows (Sovereign Entertainment, 2012)
- Stand Like Giants (Sovereign Entertainment, 2013)
- Antiques & Artefacts (Gallo, 2015)
- Trinkets, Relics & Heirlooms (Gallo, 2016)
- China (Gallo, 2018)
- Strike the Harp (Gallo, 2020)
