= Two Gallants =

Two Gallants could refer to either:

- Two Gallants (short story), a short story by James Joyce
- Two Gallants (band), a rock band
  - Two Gallants (album), the self-titled album by Two Gallants
