= The Throes =

The Throes may refer to:

- The Throes (album), 2004 album by Two Gallants
- The Throes (band), alternative rock band
- "Throes", a song by Phinehas from the album The Last Word Is Yours to Speak
