= The Woman I Love =

The Woman I Love may refer to:

- The Woman I Love (1929 film), American film
- The Woman I Love (1937 film), American film
- "The Woman I Love" (song), song by Jason Mraz
