= Love Won't Wait (disambiguation) =

"Love Won't Wait" is a song by Gary Barlow.

Love Won't Wait may also refer to:

- "Love Won't Wait", as song by Murry Wilson from the 1967 album, The Many Moods of Murry Wilson
- "Love Won't Wait", a song by Bobby Caldwell from the 1978 album, Bobby Caldwell
- "Love Won't Wait", a song by The Babys from the 1980 album, On the Edge
- "Love Won't Wait", a 1986 song by The Whites
- "Love Won't Wait", a song by Black Eyed Peas from the 1998 album, Behind the Front
- "Love Won't Wait", a song by Atomic Kitten from the 2002 album, Feels So Good
- "Love Won't Wait", a 2007 song by Ian Carey

== See also ==
- "Love Won't Wait for Love", a song by S.O.S. from the 1980 album, S.O.S.
- "Love Won't Wait for Lovin'", a song by The System from the 1985 album, The Pleasure Seekers
- "Love Won't Wait Forever", a demo song by Daniel Amos from the reissue of the 1976 album, Daniel Amos
- "Love Won't Wait Forever", a song by Robin Trower from the 1988 album, Take What You Need
- "Love Won't Wait on Me", a song by Mike Tramp from the 2004 album, Songs I Left Behind
- "My Love Won't Wait", a song by Two Gallants from the 2012 album, The Bloom and the Blight
