= 93 Million Miles =

Single by Jason Mraz

from the album Love Is a Four Letter Word
- Released: March 27, 2012
- Recorded: 2011
- Genre: Pop
- Length: 3:36
- Label: Atlantic
- Songwriters: Jason Mraz, Michael Natter, Mike Daly
- Producer: Joe Chiccarelli

Jason Mraz singles chronology
"Distance" (2012)	"93 Million Miles" (2012)	"The Woman I Love" (2013)

"93 Million Miles" is a song by American singer-songwriter Jason Mraz. It was released as the second promotional single from his fourth studio album, Love Is a Four Letter Word, on March 27, 2012 via iTunes and in October, 2012, as the second official single. It was written by Mraz, Michael Natter and Mike Daly, and produced by Joe Chiccarelli.

The song title refers to the Earth's geographical location within the Solar System, which is 93 million miles from Sun (one astronomical unit, or AU, approximately 150 million kilometers). Lyrically, the song talks about "no matter where you are in the planet, you can call it home." It received positive reviews, with critics calling it a touching and enjoyable song.

== Background ==
The song was one of four songs on Love is a Four Letter Word that Mraz wrote with Michael Natter, a guitarist in his 60s who lives up in the mountains of San Diego, and has been playing the same guitar since 1967. Mraz told Artist Direct: "I met him at coffee shop gigs, open mic nights and songwriter nights. He and his wife would play and sing' they are adorable. I invited him to my house to help me change out a toilet, since I figured he would know. He did and brought his guitar over. We change the toilet and he played his guitar. He had all these ideas and riffs that he has been playing for 35 years. He has never had an outlet. I am almost 35, so some of those ideas came into existing same time I was being conceived."

It was based on something Natter would say when the pair were sitting out in the sun, playing guitar. He told Artist Direct: "We'd look at the sun, this fiery nuclear furnace, 93 million miles away, by the time the heat and light gets to us, it's just right." The song was first released as the second promotional single from the album on iTunes, on March 27, 2012.

== Composition ==
"93 Million Miles" was written by Jason Mraz, Michael Natter and Mike Daly, while production was handled by Joe Chiccarelli. Its title refers to the Earth's geographical location within the Solar System, which is 93 million miles from the Sun.

Mraz further explained the track, in a "track-by-track" commentary for Billboard:

"93 million miles from the sun is where we live. And 240,000 miles from the moon and that's our geographical location within our solar system. Yet no matter where you are, there you are. And no matter where you are in the planet, you can call that home. I wanted to create a song that acknowledged that home is where the heart is and that's up to you to decide."

== Reception ==
The song received generally favorable reviews. While reviewing the album, Melinda Newman of HitFix wrote that "When Mraz dials back the platitudes just a little bit, something quite enjoyable emerges, such as on '93 Million Miles,' where he reminds the listener that he/she can always come back home. It’s a lilting, lovely tune." Jacob R. Tender of Under the Gun called it "endearing and warmhearted." Mike Ragogna of Huffington Post called it "clever, touching, and philosophical as well as mathematically correct."

The song debuted at number 40 on the Adult Pop Songs chart.

The song was included in a popular Brazilian soap opera, Salve Jorge, which contributed for the success in Brazil.

== Music video ==
The music video for the song was directed by Jeff Coffman and recorded during Mraz's recent appearance at Red Rocks Amphitheatre in Denver, Colorado.

== Track listing ==
- Digital download
1. "93 Million Miles" – 3:36

== Personnel ==
- Acoustic Guitar – Jason Mraz, Mike Daly
- Bass – Justin Meldal Johnson
- Drums, Percussion – Matt Chamberlin
- Guitar – Tim Pierce
- Keyboards – Jeff Babko
- Vocals – Jason Mraz
- Written – Jason Mraz, Michael Natter, Mike Daly
- Produced - Joe Chiccarelli

== Charts ==
Chart (2012–13)	Peak position
Brazil (Crowley Broadcast Analysis)	5
US Adult Alternative Airplay (Billboard)	16
US Adult Pop Airplay (Billboard)	25

=== Year-end charts ===
Chart (2013)	Position
Brazil (Crowley)	12
