= Nothing to You (re-mix) + 3 =

EP by Two Gallants
- Released: December 12, 2006
- Recorded: June 11, 2004
- Genre: Indie rock, lo-fi
- Length: 19:15
- Label: Alive

Two Gallants chronology
What the Toll Tells (2006)	Nothing to You (re-mix) + 3 (2006)	The Scenery of Farewell (EP) (2007)

Professional ratings
Review scores
Source	Rating
AllMusic	4/5 stars

Nothing to You (re-mix) + 3 is an EP released by the San Francisco indie rock duo Two Gallants in 2006 by Alive Records.

The EP features two songs from the band's debut album The Throes, newly re-mixed and the songs "Sweet Baby Jesus" and "Fail Hard to Regain (live)" from the band's first 7" release. These two are released on CD on this EP for the first time. The 4 tracks have been entirely remastered.

== Track listing ==
1. "Nothing to You (Remix)"
2. "Crow Jane (Remix)"
3. "I'm Her Man (Sweet Baby Jesus)"
4. "Fail Hard to Regain (Live)"

== Credits ==
- John Greenham - Mastering
- John Karr - Engineer
- Alex Newport - Mixing
