= Freedom Song =

A freedom song is a song sung by participants in the United States civil rights movement.

Freedom Song may refer to:

== Books ==
- Freedom Song: The Story of Henry "Box" Brown, by Sally M. Walker and illustrated by Sean Qualls
- Freedom Song: A Personal Story of the 1960s Civil Rights Movement, by Mary King, 1987
- Freedom Song: Three Novels, by Amit Chaudhuri, 2000

== Film and TV ==
- Freedom Song (film), a 2000 film about the Civil Rights Movement

== Music ==
- Freedom Song, an event at the Tallinn Song Festival Grounds Ewert and The Two Dragons

=== Albums ===
- Freedom Song (Oscar Peterson album)
- Freedom Song by James Horner, the soundtrack to the 2000 film

=== Songs ===
- "Freedom Song", a 1971 version of the traditional protest song by Roberta Flack
- "Freedom Song", a 1975 rock song by the band Thin Lizzy
- "Freedom Song", a song by Wino (band) from Everlast (2002)
- "Freedom Song", a 2005 song by Luc and the Lovingtons
- "The Freedom Song", a 2013 cover version of the Luc and the Lovingtons song by Jason Mraz
- "The Freedom Song (They'll Never Take Us Down)", a 2013 song by Neil Diamond
- 'Think' by Aretha Franklin (from the film Blues Brothers) contains the refrain Freedom! Freedom! Freedom!

== See also ==
- Song of Freedom, a 1936 British film starring Paul Robeson.
