= The World as I See It (song) =

Promotional single by Jason Mraz

from the album Love is a Four Letter Word
- Released: September 20, 2011
- Recorded: 2011
- Genre: Pop
- Length: 3:57
- Label: Atlantic
- Songwriters: Jason Mraz, Rick Nowels
- Producer: Joe Chiccarelli

"The World as I See It" is a song by American singer-songwriter Jason Mraz. It was released on iTunes on September 20, 2011. The song was announced to be the official theme for Intel and ASUS' "In Search of Incredible" campaign. It was later included on his fourth studio album Love is a Four Letter Word (2012).

The song was written by Mraz and Rick Nowels, while Joe Chiccarelli produced it. The song finds the singer exalting the world we live in. It was inspired by Albert Einstein's memoirs of the same name. The song received generally favorable reviews from music critics, who commended it for being one of the best tracks from the album.

== Background ==
After "I'm Yours" remained at the Billboard Hot 100 chart for a record 76 weeks ending in October 2009 (peaking at number 6), the singer/songwriter headed to the Gulf of Mexico in the summer of 2010 to help with efforts to clean the Deepwater Horizon oil spill. Later, he went to a trip to Ghana to fight child slavery alongside the nonprofit Free the Slaves. Later, Mraz was in Antarctica, spending time with Al Gore and learning about climate change aboard the National Geographic Explorer. During his activist outings, Mraz wrote and recorded his fourth album, Love Is a Four Letter Word, with producer Joe Chiccarelli. In an interview for Billboard, he confessed that he was less interested in following up his biggest hit than using the power that "I'm Yours" gave him to fuel positive change. He further elaborated: "The pressure I put on myself, or what I hope my 'I Won't Give Up' does, is to make a difference in people's lives . . . With 'I'm Yours', I got to go out and set my feet on different continents, and expose myself to different cultures and causes. I wanted to see who I was, outside of music."

On September 20, 2011, Mraz released "The World as I See It" as the official theme for Intel and ASUS' "In Search of Incredible" campaign. It was later included on Love is a Four Letter World, released on April 13, 2012.

== Composition and inspiration ==
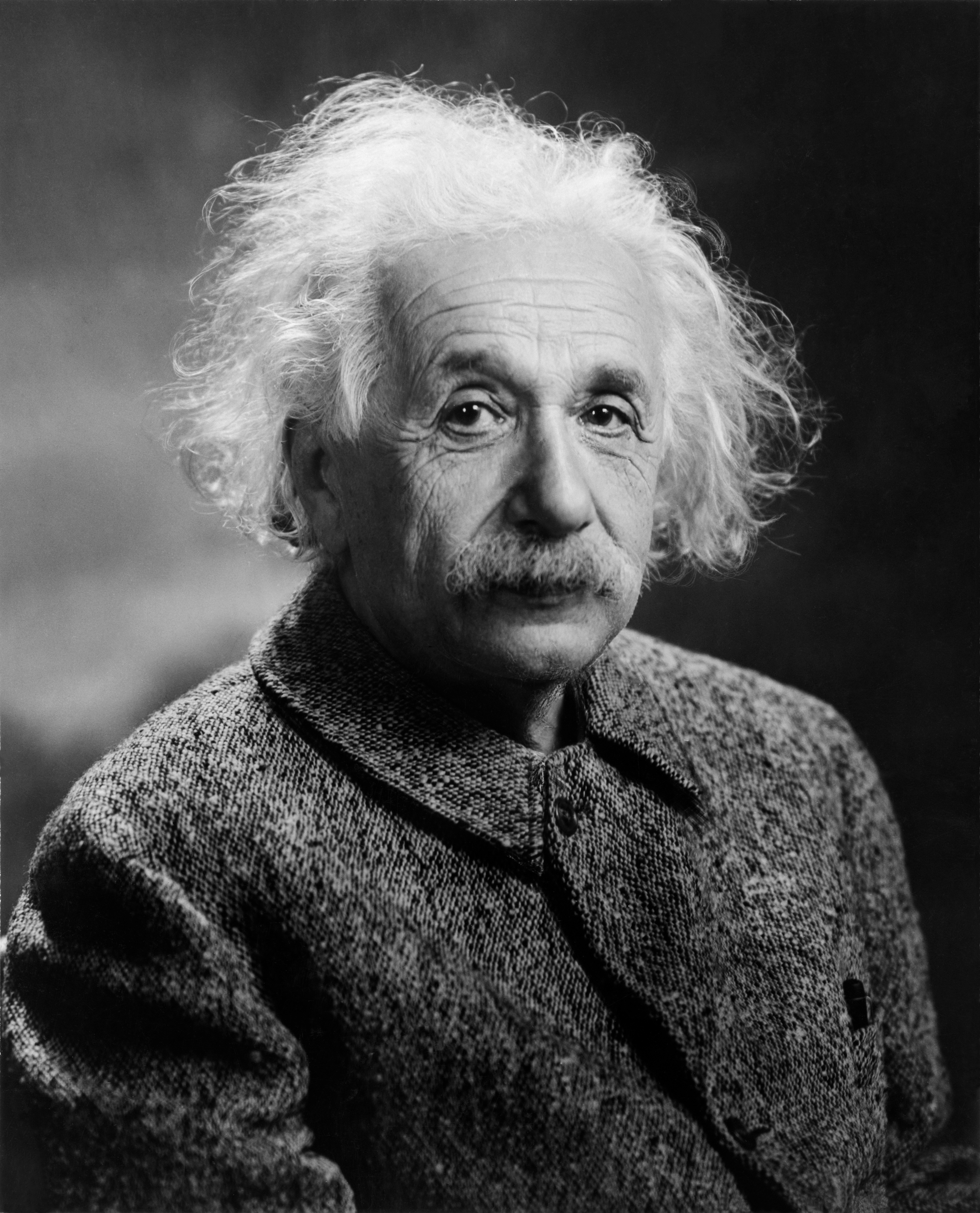
The song was inspired by Albert Einstein's memoirs, also titled The World as I See It.

"The World as I See It" was written by Jason Mraz and Rick Nowels, while production was handled by Joe Chiccarelli. It finds the singer exalting the world we live in. "The world as I see it, is a remarkable place," he sings, "A beautiful house in a forest, of stars in outer space." Mraz penned the song whilst on a worldwide tour with his longtime friend and collaborator, percussionist Noel "Toca" Rivera. Their trek involved not just playing concerts but immersing themselves in local culture and it appears their experiences inspired this song's universal theme. The song was inspired by Albert Einstein's memoirs of the same title.

Mraz further explained the track, in a "track-by-track" commentary for Billboard:

"'The World As I See It' is a remarkable place and its how I choose to see the world. I choose to see myself as part of the whole. That I'm no different than the smallest bird or the biggest mountain, that I'm made up of the same materials as those and this song title and the song itself was inspired by Albert Einstein's memoirs of the same name, 'The World As I See It.' He was a very compassionate man who loved this world unconditionally who opposed politics and policies and felt there was enough revealed through science that proved we are all connected and that we should all tread responsibly and respectfully while we're here."

== Critical reception ==
Stephen Thomas Erlewine of AllMusic also picked the song as one of the best from the album.

Colin McGuire of PopMatters wrote that the song "is destined for Top 40 Adult Contemporary domination." He also wrote that it "bleeds elevator atmosphere and each listen proves how well it would fit in next to a John Tesh lullaby or a Train ballad. The cord progression is simple and unoffensive, the perfect combination for audiences who love Delilah and can’t get enough of Matchbox Twenty." Phil Mongredien of The Observer was negative towards its lyrics, commenting that "he's not helped by clunking and ludicrous lyrics ('We are spiralling down in gravity' bravely reimagines Newton)."

== Personnel ==
- Jason Mraz – lead and backing vocals, acoustic guitar
- Matt Chamberlin – drums
- Justin Meldal Johnsen – bass guitar
- Tim Pierce – electric and classical guitars
- Jeff Babko – keyboards, organ
- David Campbell – string arrangement (on album version only)
- Joe Chiccarelli – drum programming

== Charts ==
Chart performance for "The World as I See It"
Chart (2011)	Peak position
South Korea International Singles (Gaon Chart)	1

== Release history ==
Release history and formats for "The World as I See It"
Country	Release date	Format	Label
United States	20 September 2011	Digital download	Atlantic
