= The Jacks =

The Jacks may refer to:

- Irish slang for the toilet
- Australian slang for the police
- A clipped version of Jackeen
- The Jacks (band), an American rock band from Los Angeles, California
- The Jacks (1960s Japanese band), a 1960s Japanese psychedelic rock group
- The Jacks, aka The Cadets (doo wop), a 1940s/1950s American group who have officially released work under the name "The Jacks" on RPM Records
- The Jacks, a Melbourne Australia-based punk rock'n'roll trio
- Swansea City, a Welsh football club and their supporters are unofficially nicknamed the Jacks
