= Edgeout Records =

American record label

- Founded: December 2018
- Founder: Tony Guanci, Cheryl Benson-Guanci
- Distributor: Universal Music Group
- Genre: Rock
- Country of origin: U.S.
- Location: Santa Monica, California
- Official website: edgeoutrecords.com

Edgeout Records (stylized as EDGEOUT Records) is an American independent record label, founded by Tony Guanci and Cheryl Benson-Guanci in 2018. Its releases are distributed through Universal Music Group, with which it signed an exclusive global label services agreement in December 2018.

Edgeout signs bands to "upstream" to one of Universal's labels, or alternately it has distribution division which provide services to bands/artists that meet specific criteria. The label also runs an artist development program called The Studio, which it uses to identify potential signees. Edgeout signs established artists with specialty projects and musicians to sole distribution deals.

Based in Los Angeles, Edgeout opened a second office in Nashville on October 12, 2021.

== Label activity, 2019-present ==
Edgeout announced its first signing, The Jacks, in January 2019. The Jacks debut EP single, "Walk Away," premiered May 17, 2019. The single is from their debut, self-titled EP, released June 28, 2019. The album was produced by Grammy-nominated Matt Wallace and mixed by Grammy winner Andrew Scheps at Sunset Sound Recorders in Los Angeles. In November 2019, the band released a holiday single, a rock version of "In the Bleak Midwinter," based on an 1872 work by English poet Christina Rossetti. In advance of their second EP, Remember You, the group released the first single “Just A Little Bit” on January 23, 2020. and a second single Threw It All Away on March 3, 2020. The EP was released on March 6, 2020, and was produced by Grammy winner Joe Chiccarelli. On September 17, 2021, The Jacks released a specialty-project album, titled Slowdance.

The label signed its second band, The Revelries, a pop-rock/alternative band in the winter of 2019. The Revelries first single "Cliché Love" was released on April 30, 2021, followed by several further single releases. On May 6, 2022, the band released "Best For You." The Revelries prior singles were compiled into a self-titled album, The Revelries on September 9, 2022. Edgeout signed its first established artist, DJ Ashba, in March 2020. Ashba (stylized as ASHBA) released his debut single, "Hypnotic (featuring Cali Tucker, the daughter of Tanya Tucker)" on August 14, 2020. Ashba will be releasing several more singles with different vocalists. Ashba's second single, "Let's Dance (Ft. James Michael)" was released October 16, 2020, and the official music video was released on October 23, 2020. Ashba released his latest single, titled "Bella Ciao" on October 29, 2021. Ashba then released "Malosa" on July 29, 2022. On November 10, 2023, Ashba released 'Party Tonight' ft. Dia with an accompanying music video.

The label announced their signing of Bluphoria, on February 1, 2021. The alternative/blues/psych rock band is from Eugene, Oregon southwest of Portland, although they moved to Nashville in January 2022. Bluphoria released their debut single, titled 'Set Me Up' on August 19, 2022. Bluphoria released 'Walk Through The Fire' on October 21, 2022. On January 27, 2023, the band released a single, 'Ain't Got Me,' followed by 'Columbia' on March 31, 2023. They released their debut self-titled album with the label on May 5, 2023. On June 14, 2024, the band released an EP titled "Bluphoria Live (Live At The East Iris Live Night Event/2023)." In December 2021, Edgeout released a holiday EP, titled Rock'n Holiday. The EP features three holiday tracks, including Ashba's "A Christmas Storm," The Revelries "Jingle Bells," and The Jacks "In The Bleak Midwinter."

Northern California alternative pop-punk trio Stratejacket signed to Edgeout Records in September 2021. The band released their debut single titled ‘Bad Start’ on September 22, 2023. A second single was released on March 1, 2024 - titled "Be My Drug." On May 10, 2023, StrateJacket released their self-titled five track EP. The band released another single titled "End of Time" on July 19, 2024. StrateJacket released a third single titled "Dreamcatcher" on August 30, 2024. On October 11, 2024, the band released their debut album "Bad Start."

On August 21, 2023, Edgeout signed New Zealand rock band Like A Storm. The band released the single "Sinners & Saints" on September 15, 2023. On June 28, 2024, they released another single titled "Yeah!" with featuring artists Kellin Quinn of Sleeping with Sirens and Hyro the Hero. On August 2, 2024, they released a second single with Hyro The Hero titled "All __ (Live It Up)." The band released a third single titled "Final Countdown" on September 13, 2024.

In March 2026, Edgeout signed Los Angeles based bands Hardcastle and Bruvvy to recording contracts.
