= The Freedom Song =

2012 song by Jason Mraz

"Freedom Song"

Song by Luc and the Lovingtons

from the album Feel the Warmth
- Recorded: 2005
- Venue: Healing Place Church (Baton Rouge, Louisiana)
- Genre: World
- Length: 4:27
- Label: Self-released
- Songwriters: Luc Reynaud; Jasmine; Demeiko; Children of the SU rescue shelter
- Producers: Luc Reynaud; Gary Mula

"The Freedom Song"

Promotional single by Jason Mraz

from the album Love is a Four Letter Word
- Released: March 13, 2012
- Recorded: 2011
- Genre: Jazz-Pop
- Length: 4:00
- Label: Atlantic
- Songwriter: Luc Reynaud
- Producer: Joe Chiccarelli

"Freedom Song" is a song written by Luc Reynaud and recorded by his band Luc and the Lovingtons on the album Feel the Warmth (2009). It was later covered by American singer-songwriter Jason Mraz as "The Freedom Song" and released as the first promotional single from his fourth studio album, Love is a Four Letter Word (2012), on March 13, 2012. Mraz's version was produced by Joe Chiccarelli.

== Background and release ==
After "I'm Yours" remained at the Billboard Hot 100 chart for a record 76 weeks ending in October 2009 (peaking at number 6), the singer/songwriter headed to the Gulf of Mexico in the summer of 2010 to help with efforts to clean the Deepwater Horizon oil spill. Later, he went to a trip to Ghana to fight child slavery alongside the nonprofit Free the Slaves. Later, Mraz was in Antarctica, spending time with Al Gore and learning about climate change aboard the National Geographic Explorer. During his activist outings, Mraz wrote and recorded his fourth album, "Love Is a Four Letter Word", with producer Joe Chiccarelli. In an interview for Billboard, he confessed that he was less interested in following up his biggest hit than using the power that "I'm Yours" gave him to fuel positive change. He further elaborated: "The pressure I put on myself, or what I hope my 'I Won't Give Up' does, is to make a difference in people's lives . . . With 'I'm Yours,' I got to go out and set my feet on different continents, and expose myself to different cultures and causes. I wanted to see who I was, outside of music."

The song was released as the first promotional single from the album on iTunes, on March 13, 2012.

== Composition and inspiration ==
"The Freedom Song" was written by Luc Reynaud, while production was handled by Joe Chiccarelli. It was originally penned by Luc Reynaud of the Seattle music band Luc & the Lovingtons whilst assisting in the Hurricane Katrina recovery efforts. The song caught Jason Mraz's attention and inspired by its optimistic message of how music can uplift the human spirit, the singer-songwriter started performing it in his concerts. "I picture something, it's beautiful/ It's full of life and it is all blue", he sings in the beginning. "I see a sunset on the beach/yeah, it makes me feel calm," he also sings, continuing, "when I’m calm I feel good/when I feel good I sing."

Mraz further explained the track, in a "track-by-track" commentary for Billboard:

"'The Freedom Song' is the first cover song that I've ever put on any of my albums. It was written by Luc Reynaud from the band called Luc & the Lovingtons and he wrote this song in the wake of Hurricane Katrina with kids in Baton Rouge in a shelter. I heard this song and I heard the story of this song and was blown away. I immediately started performing it, this was about two years ago, because I felt the themes and the quality of the song really resonated and was in alignment with other songs I was performing. It just felt good. I became good friends with Luc and we toured around a bunch. So when it came time to make this album I just felt like this was a song that deserves to be heard and I know the commercialism of songwriting that I know in the end this song is going to come back and benefit Luc and the communities in which he wrote this song and I think that's really important."

== Critical reception ==
Bill Lamb of About.com and Stephen Thomas Erlewine of Allmusic both picked the song as one of the best from the album. Amy Dawson of Metro UK called it "a Jack Johnson-esque lilting number topped with bongos and gospel oohs." Loh Chua Junn of MediaCorp's xinmsn wrote that while listening to the song "you're sure to tap your feet and bob your head to the beat in nary a second." Colin McGuire of PopMatters wrote a very positive review, stating:

"'The Freedom Song' is the best example of such. Kicking off the record, the song features all the elements that make the songwriter so appealing. Beautiful backing harmonies? Check. The phrase 'when I feel good'? Check. A chilled-out tone that embarrassingly brings a smile to your face without even feeling it? Check. The word 'joy'? Double check. What makes this particular track memorable is where Mraz opts to go after dabbling in the beach-dude formula he’s always been so well at conveying throughout his four studio albums. After nearly a minute of the 'I’m Yours' groove, the rest of his band kicks in and things really start to get interesting. A powerful horn section sends tingles through your upper back and an irresistibly funky backbone paves the way for one of the greatest songs of the man’s career. Love pop music or hate pop music, this is pretty good stuff."

== Track listing ==
- Digital download
1. "The Freedom Song" – 4:00

== Charts ==
| Chart (2012) | Peak position |
|---|---|
| Belgium (Ultratip Flanders) | 86 |
| Belgium (Ultratip Wallonia) | 21 |
| Canada (Hot Canadian Digital Songs) | 73 |
| Netherlands (Mega Single Top 100) | 94 |
| US Rock Digital Songs (Billboard) | 19 |

== Release history ==
| Country | Release date | Format | Label |
|---|---|---|---|
| United States | March 13, 2012 | Digital download | Atlantic |
