= The Scenery of Farewell =

The Scenery of Farewell EP

EP by Two Gallants
- Released: June 4, 2007 (UK); June 19, 2007 (NA)
- Genre: Indie rock Lo-fi
- Length: 28:45
- Label: Saddle Creek

Two Gallants chronology
Nothing to You (re-mix) + 3 (EP) (2006)	The Scenery of Farewell EP (2007)	Two Gallants (2007)

Professional ratings
Review scores
Source	Rating
AllMusic	2.5/5 stars
Pitchfork Media	6.5/10

The Scenery of Farewell is the second EP by San Francisco indie band Two Gallants release on 4 June 2007 in the UK, and 19 June 2007 in the U.S. and Canada. According to the band, the five-track album is the result of the first of two 2007 recording sessions and reflects a more stripped down side of the band.

== Track listing ==
1. "Seems Like Home to Me" - 3:47
2. "Lady" - 5:42
3. "Up the Country" - 6:07
4. "All Your Faithless Loyalties" - 5:12
5. "Linger On" - 7:57
