= We Are Undone =

Studio album by Two Gallants
- Released: February 2, 2015
- Genre: Indie rock
- Length: 43:15
- Label: ATO

Two Gallants chronology
The Bloom and the Blight (2012)	We Are Undone (2015)

Professional ratings
Aggregate scores
Source	Rating
AnyDecentMusic?	6.3/10
Metacritic	68/100
Review scores
Source	Rating
AllMusic	4/5 stars
Consequence of Sound	D
Drowned in Sound	7/10
Exclaim!	8/10
The Line of Best Fit	5.5/10
Pitchfork	6.9/10
Under the Radar	6.5/10 stars

We Are Undone is the fifth full-length studio album from the band Two Gallants, released on February 2, 2015. Following 2012's The Bloom and the Blight, We Are Undone is the band's second release on ATO. Thematically, the album ranges from songs that attempt to make sense of the dramatically shifting social landscape of their home town, to the illusion of authenticity, impending environmental collapse, and romantic estrangement.

A 20-date headlining European tour to support the album began on February 19, 2015, in Dublin, Ireland.

== Track listing ==
1. "We Are Undone"
2. "Incidental"
3. "Fools Like Us"
4. "Invitation to the Funeral"
5. "Some Trouble"
6. "My Man Go"
7. "Katy Kruelly"
8. "Heart Breakdown"
9. "Murder the Season/The Age Nocturne"
10. "There's So Much I Don't Know"
