= What the Toll Tells =

Studio album by Two Gallants
- Released: February 13, 2006 (UK); February 21, 2006 (US)
- Recorded: July 2005
- Studios: Tiny Telephone, San Francisco
- Genres: Indie rock, lo-fi
- Length: 59:42
- Label: Saddle Creek
- Producer: Scott Solter

Two Gallants chronology
The Throes (2004)	What the Toll Tells (2006)	Nothing to You (re-mix) + 3 (EP) (2006)

What the Toll Tells is the second album recorded by Two Gallants released in February 2006 (see 2006 in music). It was recorded at Tiny Telephone Studios, San Francisco during July 2005.

This album is the 91st release of Saddle Creek Records.

== Critical response ==
Professional ratings
Review scores
Source	Rating
AbsolutePunk	7.5/10 stars
AllMusic	4/5 stars
Drowned in Sound	8/10 stars
Entertainment.ie	4/5 stars
Gigwise	4.5/5 stars
musicOMH.com	4/5 stars
NME	8/10 stars
Pitchfork	(4.8/10)
Prefix Magazine	5/10 stars

What the Toll Tells received generally favorable reviews from music critics around the country. The album received a high score of 71 on metacritic.com, a review-aggregation website.

== Controversy ==
The song "Long Summer Day", which is based on the Moses Platt song, was criticised in multiple publications' reviews of the album, including in Prefix Magazine and Pitchfork Media. The song describes a black man dealing with the oppression of a white boss, and considering a possibly violent reaction. The use of the word "nigger" in particular drew fire, with reviews claiming the Two Gallants (both white) were "borrowing otherness" in writing the song. The Two Gallants gave a sarcastic reply on their website, claiming to be unaware that they aren't allowed to "write about our country's embarrassing past" and that they are required to write about "the trials of two pale skinned urbanites who have never known a day of struggle in their lives".

== Track listing ==
1. "Las Cruces Jail" – 5:46
2. "Steady Rollin'" – 4:28
3. "Some Slender Rest" – 8:57
4. "Long Summer Day" – 4:54
5. "The Prodigal Son" – 3:13
6. "Threnody" – 9:34
7. "16th St. Dozens" – 5:15
8. "Age of Assassins" – 8:01
9. "Waves of Grain" – 9:34
10. "Big Lucille" (vinyl only)
11. "Negrophilia Blues" (vinyl only)

== Credits ==
- Alberto Cuéllar - Antonio Cuellar Trombone, Trumpet
- Jackie Perez Gratz - Cello
- Alan Hynes - Design
- Chelsea Jackson (pseudonym of Adam Stephens) - Guitar, Harmonica, vocals
- Dan Kasin - Management
- Scott Solter - Engineer, Mixing
- Doug VanSloun - Mastering
- Auggie Washington (pseudonym of Tyson Vogel) - drums, Vocals
