= Steady Rollin' =

Single by Two Gallants

from the album What the Toll Tells
- B-side: "Dappens,"Don't Want No Woman Who Stays Out All Night Long"
- Released: March 27, 2006
- Recorded: 2005
- Genre: Indie rock Lo-fi
- Label: Saddle Creek
- Producer(s): Scott Solter

Two Gallants singles chronology
"Las Cruces Jail" (2005)	"Steady Rollin'" (2006)

"Steady Rollin" is an iTunes single released by the San Francisco band, Two Gallants, and was the first European 7" single from What the Toll Tells.

This single is the 92nd release of Saddle Creek Records.

== Track listing for (iTunes) and Compact disc ==
1. "Steady Rollin'"
2. "Dappens "
3. "Don't Want No Woman Who Stays Out All Night Long"

== Track listing (Vinyl) ==
1. "Steady Rollin'"
2. "Dappens "

== Other appearances ==
- Acoustic 07 (2007, V2 Records)
