= We Live on Cliffs =

Studio album by Adam Stephens of Two Gallants
- Released: September 28, 2010
- Genre: Indie rock, Americana
- Length: 35:19
- Label: Saddle Creek Records
- Producer: Joe Chiccarelli

We Live on Cliffs is the debut studio album by singer/songwriter Adam Stephens, vocalist and guitar player for San Francisco, California's folk rock guitar/drum duo Two Gallants. We Live on Cliffs was released on September 28, 2010, on Saddle Creek Records. The album is credited to "Adam Haworth Stephens" and was produced by Joe Chiccarelli.

== Background ==
Two Gallants had been touring almost non-stop for six years, since forming in 2002, until taking a hiatus starting in the summer of 2008. During that time the duo also recorded and released three full-length albums as well as an album-length EP. The stress of touring with seemingly non-stop van breakdowns, recording sessions, and countless interviews tired the band out both mentally and physically. Stephens and fellow band member Tyson Vogel each decided to focus on other work, with Stephens pursuing a solo album and Vogel collaborating with some string players on an instrumental project called Devotionals.

== Critical reception ==
Professional ratings
Review scores
Source	Rating
Uncut	4/5 stars

We Live on Cliffs received mixed reviews from critics. Jessie Cataldo of Slant criticized the album as being formulaic, stating, "The focus here is crystalline, immaculately styled country—slow, pretty songs fleshed out by female backing vocals. At worst, it’s an album full of half-cocked Ryan Adams impressions, digging into an antiseptic style that sounds cheesy even when Adams attempts it." Cataldo as well as Alex Henderson of AllMusic and a review at Sputnikmusic all discussion the album as attempting to sound Dylan-esque, and failing to live up to such a high standard for Americana music. Despite the criticism, Cataldo and Henderson did make note of Stephens' potential as a songwriter and solo artist.

== Track listing ==
No.	Title	Length
1.	"Praises in Your Name"	3:59
2.	"Second Mind"	4:31
3.	"With Vengeance Come"	4:27
4.	"Heights of Diamond"	3:52
5.	"The Cities That You've Burned"	4:23
6.	"Elderwoods"	4:25
7.	"Southern Lights"	3:53
8.	"Angelina"	4:18
9.	"Everyday I Fall"	4:22
Total length:		35:19
