= More than Friends (Jason Mraz song) =

Single by Jason Mraz featuring Meghan Trainor

from the album Know.
- Released: October 8, 2018
- Recorded: 2018
- Length: 3:01
- Label: Atlantic
- Songwriters: Jason Mraz; Meghan Trainor; Jonathan Green; Andrew Wells
- Producer: Andrew Wells

Jason Mraz singles chronology
"Might as Well Dance" (2018)	"More than Friends" (2018)	"Look for the Good" (2020)

Meghan Trainor singles chronology
"Just Got Paid" (2018)	"More than Friends" (2018)	"Hey DJ" (2018)

Music video
- "More than Friends" on YouTube

"More than Friends" is a song recorded by American singer-songwriter Jason Mraz featuring American singer-songwriter Meghan Trainor from his sixth studio album Know. (2018). It was written by Mraz, Trainor, Jonathan Green and Andrew Wells, and produced by the latter. Atlantic Records released it on October 8, 2018, as the fourth single from the album. A "bubbly" and "quirky" acoustic love song, "More than Friends" is about a pair of friends interested in taking their relationship to the next level, with implications of a summer romance.

Darren Doane directed the music video for "More than Friends". Released on September 17, 2018, the video features a meta concept where a pair of co-workers at a video shoot admit romantic feelings for each other. This is interspersed with scenes of the singers performing the song. It was also supported by a dance video directed by Ryan Hutchins. Commercially, "More than Friends" charted at number 49 on the Belgium Ultratip chart and number 32 on the US Adult Top 40. Mraz and Trainor performed the song on The Ellen DeGeneres Show.

== Background and composition ==
Andrew Wells produced “More than Friends” and co-wrote it with Jason Mraz, Meghan Trainor and Jonathan Green. After Mraz initially finished his album Know., Wells suggested that he have a songwriting session with Trainor. Mraz agreed to this, but was unsure of what would come of it. "More than Friends" was written during this session, and led to him pushing back "a few departments and their deadlines" to accommodate it on the record. With the song, Trainor intended to create her own version of Mraz and Colbie Caillat's song "Lucky" (2009). It was inspired by a conversation Mraz had with his wife, he said "My wife, she has these cute things she does, when I make her a cup of coffee, I'll be like, 'Is it good?' And she'll say, 'Oh, more than friends.' I thought that was so cute."

"More than Friends" is a "bubbly" and "quirky" acoustic love song. It is sung in a back-and-forth style with Mraz opening with "It feels like we've been friends forever and we always see eye-to-eye", and Trainor responds "At the risk of sounding foolish/ I don't wanna fool around no more/ So if we're gonna do this, then let's do this/ You could fix my broken heart if it's all yours." It has a "catchy" chorus and "summery, carefree vibes." The song was described as "breezy" and "ebullient" by some critics. It has lyrics about "wishing you could step out of the friend zone." A writer for iHeartRadio MMVAs said that it "gives off the vibe of a budding summer romance", noting that its lyrics recount "the feelings of a pair of friends who are interested in taking their relationship to the next level."

== Music video and promotion ==
A lyric video featuring animation by Maddy Franklin accompanied the song's release. Darren Doane directed the music video for "More than Friends" which was released through Mraz's YouTube channel. It was released on September 17, 2018, and features a meta concept where a pair of co-workers at the video shoot for the song admit romantic feelings for each other, followed by a celebration of their newfound relationship.

The video begins with two people working on the set of a music video, as the director and the stylist respectively, glancing at each other occasionally. They deal with their emotions before admitting their feelings to each other. Trainor and Mraz perform the song while getting ready for the shoot. The video concludes with a dance sequence that celebrates the former couple's new union. On November 1, 2018, an official dance video, directed by Ryan Hutchins, and starring Nicola Collie and Derek Schiesel, was released.

Mraz and Trainor performed "More than Friends" at The Ellen DeGeneres Show on September 18, 2018.

== Commercial performance ==
"More than Friends" charted at number 35 on the Belgium Flanders Ultratip chart, number 43 on the Belgium Wallonia Ultratip chart, and number 32 on the US Adult Top 40.

== Credits and personnel ==
Credits are referenced from the album's liner notes:

- Jason Mraz – songwriting, lead vocals, production
- Meghan Trainor – songwriting
- Andrew Wells – songwriting, production, engineering, guitar, organ, piano
- Jon Green – songwriting
- Sean Hurley – bass
- Rob Humphreys – drums, percussion
- Chris Gehringer – mastering
- Tony Maserati – mixing
- Tyler Scott – mixing
- Drew Taubenfeld – pedal steel guitar

== Charts ==
Chart (2018)	Peak position
Belgium (Ultratip Flanders)	35
Belgium (Ultratip Wallonia)	43
Canada AC (Billboard)	49
US Adult Pop Airplay (Billboard)	32

== Release history ==
Country	Date	Format	Label	Ref.
Various	July 27, 2018	Digital download	Atlantic	
United States	October 8, 2018	Hot adult contemporary	Atlantic	
