= Las Cruces Jail =

Single by Two Gallants

from the album What the Toll Tells
- B-side: "Long Summer Day (Acoustic)"
- Released: 2005
- Recorded: 2005
- Genre: Indie rock Lo-fi
- Label: Saddle Creek
- Producer: Scott Solter

Two Gallants singles chronology
"I'm Her Man" (2004)	"Las Cruces Jail" (2005)	"Steady Rollin'" (2006)

"Las Cruces Jail" is the first single from the album, What the Toll Tells by Two Gallants. It was a limited, 7" single. The album was the 90th release of Saddle Creek Records.

The song's lyrics are about Billy the Kid's imprisonment near Las Cruces, New Mexico.

== Track listing ==
1. Side One: "Las Cruces Jail"
2. Side Two: "Long Summer Day (acoustic)"
