= Love Someone (Jason Mraz song) =

Single by Jason Mraz

from the album Yes!
- Released: May 19, 2014
- Recorded: 2014
- Genre: Pop
- Length: 4:16
- Label: Atlantic
- Songwriters: Mai Bloomfield; Becky Gebhardt; Chris Keup; Jason Mraz; Stewart Myers; Chaska Potter; Mona Tavakoli
- Producers: Mike Mogis; Jason Mraz; Chris Keup; Stewart Myers

Jason Mraz singles chronology
| "Rough Water" (2013) | "Love Someone" (2014) | "Have It All" (2018) |

"Love Someone" is a song by American singer-songwriter Jason Mraz. It was released on May 19, 2014, by Atlantic Records as the lead single from his fifth studio album, Yes!.

== Background ==
Mraz and Mike Mogis produced the song. It was written by Mraz, Chris Keup and Stewart Myers, along with members of the indie-rock-folk band Raining Jane (Mai Bloomfield, Becky Gebhardt, Chaska Potter and Mona Tavakoli). They served as his band on the record. Mraz has been working with other artists in this way since 2007.

== Track listing ==
- Download digital
1. Love Someone — 4:16
- Download digital (9 Theory Remixes)
1. Love Someone (9 Theory Remix) — 3:31
2. Love Someone (9 Theory Magical Mystery Mix) — 4:53

== Charts ==
Weekly chart performance for "Love Someone"
| Chart (2014) | Peak position |
|---|---|
| Belgium (Ultratip Bubbling Under Flanders) | 16 |
| Belgium (Ultratip Bubbling Under Wallonia) | 27 |
| Brazil (Billboard Hot 100) | 60 |
| Canada Hot 100 (Billboard) | 79 |
| Canada AC (Billboard) | 36 |
| Germany (GfK) | 83 |
| Japan Hot 100 (Billboard) | 18 |
| Switzerland (Schweizer Hitparade) | 55 |
| US Bubbling Under Hot 100 (Billboard) | 14 |

Annual chart rankings for "Love Someone"
| Chart (2014) | Rank |
|---|---|
| Japan Adult Contemporary (Billboard) | 20 |

== Personnel ==
- Jason Mraz – vocals, guitar, production

Raining Jane

- Mai Bloomfield – vocals, cello, high strung guitar
- Becky Gebhardt – bass
- Chaska Potter – vocals
- Mona Tavakoli – vocals, drums, percussion

Additional personnel

- Mike Mogis – production
- Chris Keup – co-production
- Stewart Myers – co-production
- Andy Powers – acoustic guitar, electric guitar, pedal steel, mandolin
- Chris Joyner – organ, piano, tanpura drone
- Ben Brodin – drums, percussion, piano
- John O'Reilly – additional drums

== Release history ==
| Region | Date | Format | Label | Ref. |
|---|---|---|---|---|
| United States | May 19, 2014 | Digital download | Atlantic Records | |
| United States | March 10, 2015 | Digital download (9 Theory Remixes) | Atlantic Records | |
