= Hello, You Beautiful Thing =

Promotional single by Jason Mraz

from the album Yes!
- Released: May 23, 2014
- Recorded: 2013–14
- Genre: Pop
- Length: 3:32
- Label: Atlantic
- Songwriter(s): Jason Mraz; Chaska Potter; Becky Gebhardt
- Producer(s): Mike Mogis; Jason Mraz

"Hello, You Beautiful Thing" is a pop song by American singer-songwriter Jason Mraz. It was released on May 23, 2014 on Atlantic Records as the first promotional single from his fifth studio album Yes!.

== Music video ==
The music video was released on July 15, 2014. The music video was directed by Jeff Nicholas and Jonathan Craven

== Track listing ==
- CD Single
1. Hello, You Beautiful Thing — 3:32
- Download digital
1. Hello, You Beautiful Thing — 3:32

== Charts ==
Chart (2014)	Peak position
Belgium (Ultratip Bubbling Under Flanders)	25
Belgium (Ultratip Bubbling Under Wallonia)	12
Canada AC (Billboard)	39
Netherlands (Single Top 100)	53
UK Singles (Official Charts Company)	152

== Release history ==
Region	Date	Format	Label	Ref.
United States	May 23, 2014	Digital download	Atlantic Records	
