= Love Is a Four Letter Word (album) =

Studio album by Jason Mraz
- Released: April 13, 2012
- Recorded: 2009–11
- Genre: Folk-pop; guitar pop
- Length: 55:50
- Label: Atlantic
- Producer: Joe Chiccarelli; Rick Nowels

Jason Mraz chronology
Beautiful Mess: Live on Earth (2009)	Love Is a Four Letter Word (2012)	Yes! (2014)

Singles from Love Is a Four Letter Word
- 1. "I Won't Give Up" Released: January 3, 2012; 2. "93 Million Miles" Released: March 27, 2012; 3. "The Woman I Love" Released: February 4, 2013

Love Is a Four Letter Word is the fourth studio album by the American singer-songwriter Jason Mraz, released on April 13, 2012, by Atlantic Records. "I Won't Give Up" was released as the album's first single on January 3, 2012.

== Background ==
In November 2009, Mraz posted on his MySpace page plans for a new album to be recorded starting in December, writing, "In 2 weeks time I will enter the studio and begin recording the next album. Only a handful of songs are written and slated but the momentum of love is with me. Every day new verses get added on. The songs are coming together piece by piece. The process is unlike any of the other records before this. It's like I'm being gifted the album without having to do the work. I'm creating that in 6 months the project will be complete and then we'll hit the road again with new sounds and new musicians."

In 2010, Mraz spent some time in London, England, where he worked on songs for his new album with the producer Martin Terefe and wrote with the British singer-songwriter, Dido. In August 2010, Mraz had a Q&A interview with Spin magazine in which he said that possible titles for his fourth album were Peace Canoe or The Love Album.

On December 8, 2011, Mraz told Jeff Benjamin of Billboard that the "album is finished" except for one track he was attempting to re-work as an acoustic version. Describing the album, he said, "It's not a departure in the sound of the genre in any way, it's just different tones, different textures. Musically, I think people are going to like it. It's personal. It's melodic. And it's mellow. There's a couple of up-tempo tunes, but mostly the rhythm of the heartbeat kind of takes precedence on this record. Medium-tempo tunes; which I love. It feels more like the pace of life. At least, based on my life and what I've been doing."

On January 20, 2012, during a performance streamed live from the Bing Bar at the Sundance Film Festival, Mraz told the audience that the album's title was Love Is a Four Letter Word.

== Reception ==
=== Critical reception ===
Professional ratings
Aggregate scores
Source	Rating
Metacritic	(63/100)
Review scores
Source	Rating
AllMusic	4/5 stars
Boston Globe	positive
Entertainment Weekly	B
The Guardian	3/5 stars
Metro UK	favorable
New York Times	favorable
The Observer	1/5 stars
Rolling Stone	3/5 stars
Virgin Media	3/5 stars
Under The Gun	7.5/10

The album received favorable reviews. At Metacritic, which assigns a normalized rating out of 100 to reviews from mainstream critics, the album received an average score of 63, based on 10 reviews, which indicates "generally favorable reviews". Stephen Thomas Erlewine from AllMusic gave the album 4 out of 5 stars, writing, "Mraz pushes himself into new territory, creating music that's perilously close to sounding seductive." Kyle Anderson wrote for Entertainment Weekly that "he tiptoes the line between hammock-strung wisdom and twee naïveté with such goofball charisma that otherwise forgettable love-each-other-doodles become sweetly breezy anthems." Matthew Horton from Virgin Media wrote that "It's all light as air, of course, and corny as hell but Mraz isn't here to kick James any statues. If you're after unchallenging whimsy with the odd sparky arrangement he'll continue to do just fine." Caroline Sullivan from The Guardian complimented "his words with a variety of genres that show him to be a cracking musician." She also wrote that "this is pure, undemanding pleasure: his voice has a natural affinity with elegant lounge-jazz and introspective folk-blues, as well as the delicately hewn soft rock that made his name." Jody Rosen from Rolling Stone gave the album 3 out of 5 stars, writing that "inspired, perhaps, by the massive success of his lite-reggae anthem "I'm Yours", he's added more world-music textures to his folk pop, and turned up the blissed-out vibes on the album." Sandy Cohen from The Boston Globe wrote, "The songs about heartache don't detract from the optimistic vibe of this 12-song collection."

Jon Caramanica from The New York Times criticized the album, writing that the album is "filled with platitudes and, eventually, psychobabble, dippy even by Mr. Mraz's standards." Phil Mongredien from The Observer gave the album only 1 star out of 5, writing that "the lyrics alternate between the ludicrous and the banal." Amy Dawson from Metro UK wrote that "Mraz's earnest, melodic guitar pop exerts mainstream appeal, but this will all be a bit earnest teen drama soundtrack for some." Loh Chuan Junn from MediaCorp's xinmsn opined that "every song on this album is listenable, but when put on loop, Mraz's relentlessly upbeat and happy romanticism grows increasing annoying for even the least cynical."

=== Commercial performance ===
In the United Kingdom, the album debuted at number two on the UK Albums Chart behind Adeles 21 by a margin of 44 copies. It sold 17,021 copies and is Mraz' highest-charting album there. In the United States, Love Is a Four Letter Word debuted at number two on the Billboard 200, becoming his highest-charting album. It sold 102,000 copies in its first week, his best sales week to date. In Canada, the album debuted at number one on the Canadian Albums Chart, selling 19,300 copies, making it Mraz' first number one debut in Canada. Up to April 24, 2014, the album has sold 547,755 copies in the United States. It has been certified Gold in Brazil.

== Singles and promotional singles ==
"The World As I See It" was released as the first pre-release track on September 20, 2011. This version differs slightly from the album, the latter having an additional string part. Later, "I Won't Give Up" was released as the album's first official single on January 3, 2012. The song peaked at number 8 on the U.S. Billboard Hot 100. The song was initially presented as a lyric video around its January release, before another video was released in March 2012.

"The Freedom Song" (March 13), "93 Million Miles" (March 27) and "Everything Is Sound" (April 10) were each released as pre-release tracks in the run up to the album's release, with each song having a lyric video on the official YouTube page. Later, "93 Million Miles" was released as the second official single. "The Woman I Love" was released as the third official single from the album, on February 4, 2013.

== Track listing ==
No.	Title	Writer(s)	Length
1.	"The Freedom Song"	Luc Reynaud	3:59
2.	"Living in the Moment"	Jason Mraz, Rick Nowels	3:55
3.	"The Woman I Love"	Mraz, David Hodges	3:10
4.	"I Won't Give Up"	Mraz, Michael Natter	4:00
5.	"5/6"	Mraz, Natter	5:57
6.	"Everything Is Sound"	Mraz, Tyler Phillips, Matt Hales, Mike Daly, Martin Terefe	4:45
7.	"93 Million Miles"	Mraz, Natter, Daly	3:36
8.	"Frank D. Fixer"	Mraz, Martin Terefe, Sacha Skarbek	4:45
9.	"Who's Thinking About You Now?"	Mraz, Eric Hinojosa	4:47
10.	"In Your Hands"	Mraz, Skarbek	4:51
11.	"Be Honest" (featuring Inara George)	Mraz, Natter	3:25
12.	"The World as I See It"	Mraz, Rick Nowels	3:59
13.	"I'm Coming Over" (hidden track; album only)	Mraz, Daly	4:29

iTunes and jasonmraz.com bonus tracks
No.	Title	Writer(s)	Length
14.	"I Won't Give Up" (demo)	Mraz, Natter	5:16
15.	"The World as I See It" (live EP version)	Mraz, Nowels	8:34
16.	"You Fuckin' Did It" (explicit live EP version)	Mraz, Noel Rivera	5:05
17.	"The Woman I Love" (live EP version)	Mraz, Hodges	3:20
18.	"I Never Knew You" (live EP version)	Mraz	8:55
19.	"I Won't Give Up" (video)	Mraz, Natter	4:35

jasonmraz.com pre-order bonus track
No.	Title	Writer(s)	Length
20.	"Collapsible Plans"	Mraz	5:15

Japanese version bonus track
No.	Title	Writer(s)	Length
20.	"Don't Change"	Mraz	4:11

Notes

- Additional production on "Living in the Moment" and "The World as I See It" by Rick Nowels.

== Personnel ==
- Jason Mraz – vocals on all tracks, acoustic guitar on all tracks, bouzouki on "Living in the Moment"
- Matt Chamberlain – drums on all tracks except "Be Honest", percussion on "93 Million Miles" and "Be Honest"
- Gregg Field – drums on "Be Honest"
- Victor Indrizzo – percussion on "The Freedom Song" and "Living in the Moment"
- Steve Aho – vibraphone on "Be Honest"
- Justin Meldal-Johnsen – bass guitar on all tracks except "I Won't Give Up"
- Paul Bushnell – bass guitar on "I Won't Give Up"
- Tim Pierce – guitar on all tracks
- Jeff Babko – keyboards on all tracks
- Zac Rae – additional keyboards on "5/6", "Everything Is Sound" and "Frank D. Fixer"
- Horn Section on "The Freedom Song" and "Everything Is Sound" performed by Grooveline Horns: Carlos Sosa – saxophone; Fernando Castillo – trumpet; Reggie Watkins – trombone
- Rick Nowels – additional acoustic guitar on "Living in the Moment"
- Mike Daly – additional acoustic guitar on "The Woman I Love", "Everything Is Sound", "93 Million Miles" and "In Your Hands"
- Joe Chiccarelli – drum programming on "I Won't Give Up" and "The World as I See It"
- David Davidson – string arrangements on "I Won't Give Up"
- David Campbell – string arrangements on "5/6", "Who's Thinking About You Now?" and "The World as I See It"
- G. Love – harmonica on "Frank D. Fixer"
- Inara George – guest vocals on "Be Honest"
- Background vocals on "The Freedom Song" performed by: Noel "Toca" Rivera; C.C. White
- Background vocals on "I Won't Give Up" performed by: Noel "Toca" Rivera; Arnold McCuller; Ailee; Valerie Pinkston
- Background vocals on "Everything Is Sound" performed by: Arnold McCuller; Ailee

== Charts ==
=== Weekly charts ===
Chart (2012)	Peak position
Australian Albums (ARIA)	23
Austrian Albums (Ö3 Austria)	6
Belgian Albums (Ultratop Flanders)	22
Belgian Albums (Ultratop Wallonia)	24
Canadian Albums (Billboard)	1
Danish Albums (Hitlisten)	15
Dutch Albums (Album Top 100)	2
French Albums (SNEP)	15
German Albums (Offizielle Top 100)	12
Irish Albums (IRMA)	19
Italian Albums (FIMI)	70
New Zealand Albums (RMNZ)	25
Norwegian Albums (VG-lista)	10
Portuguese Albums (AFP)	29
Scottish Albums Chart (OCC)	5
Spanish Albums (Promusicae)	15
Swiss Albums (Schweizer Hitparade)	4
UK Albums (OCC)	2
US Billboard 200	2
US Top Rock Albums (Billboard)	1
US Digital Albums (Billboard)	1
US Indie Store Album Sales (Billboard)	14

=== Year-end charts ===
Chart (2012)	Position
Canadian Albums (Billboard)	33
Dutch Albums (Album Top 100)	29
UK Albums (OCC)	156
US Billboard 200	69
US Top Rock Albums (Billboard)	19

== Certifications ==
Region	Certification	Certified units/sales
Brazil (Pro-Música Brasil) deluxe	3× Diamond	480,000^{‡}
Canada (Music Canada)	Platinum	80,000^{^}
Singapore (RIAS)	Gold	5,000^{*}
United Kingdom (BPI)	Gold	100,000^{‡}
United States (RIAA)	Platinum	1,000,000^{^}
^{*} Sales figures based on certification alone.^{^} Shipments figures based on certification alone.^{‡} Sales+streaming figures based on certification alone.

== Release history ==
Region	Date	Format(s)	Label
Germany	April 13, 2012	CD, digital download	Atlantic Records
United Kingdom	April 16, 2012	CD, digital download	Atlantic Records
United States	April 17, 2012	CD, digital download	Atlantic Records
Taiwan	April 17, 2012	CD, digital download	Warner Music Group
Poland	April 23, 2012	CD, digital download	Warner Music Group
