= Hyperalgesia (album) =

Studio album by Victorian Halls
- Released: May 19, 2015
- Studios: Gossip Studios, Chicago
- Genres: Alternative rock, indie
- Length: 39:31
- Label: Victory Records
- Producer: Victorian Halls

Victorian Halls chronology
Charlatan (2011)	Hyperalgesia (2015)

Singles from Victorian Halls
- 1. "Tonight Only The Dead" Released: 2015; 2. "Come in with the Storm" Released: 2015; 3. "Scarlets" Released: 2016

Hyperalgesia is the second full-length studio album by American alternative rock band Victorian Halls. The album, that contains 11-tracks, was recorded in Gossip Studios, Chicago, produced by Sean Lenart, then mixed at legendary Sunset Sound Recorders in Hollywood, California, with help of renowned music producer and mixer Joe Chiccarelli, who has in the past produced dozens of albums for well-known acts and singers (such as Frank Zappa's Joe's Garage) and released in May 2015. The band produced the music video to the song Scarlets from the album in June 2016 and then promoted the material from their new release on their “All My Friends Are Dead” US-wide Tour

== Track listing ==
All tracks are written by Victorian Halls, except where noted.

No.	Title	Length
1.	"All My Friends"	1:19
2.	"Scarlets"	5:01
3.	"Dissolution"	4:02
4.	"Tonight Only the Dead"	4:27
5.	"Liars"	4:21
6.	"Home"	4:28
7.	"Most Firearms Are More Than Adequate in Killing an Undead Brain"	3:17
8.	"Come in with the Storm"	4:45
9.	"Reprise"	1:00
10.	"Sun"	4:09
11.	"Currency"	2:42
