= Yes! (Jason Mraz album) =

Studio album by Jason Mraz
- Released: July 11, 2014
- Recorded: 2013–2014
- Genres: Pop, pop rock
- Length: 51:35
- Label: Atlantic

Jason Mraz chronology
| Love Is a Four Letter Word (2012) | Yes! (2014) | Know. (2018) |

Singles from Yes!
- 1. "Love Someone" Released: May 19, 2014

Yes! is the fifth studio album by American singer-songwriter Jason Mraz. The album was released on July 11, 2014, Atlantic Records. The album's lead single "Love Someone" was released on May 19, 2014.

The album is a collaboration between Jason Mraz and the members of indie-rock-folk band Raining Jane: Mai Bloomfield, Becky Gebhardt, Chaska Potter and Mona Tavakoli, with whom Mraz has been working since 2007, and who are his backing band on the record, as well as co-writers of majority of the songs.

== Critical reception ==
Professional ratings
Aggregate scores
| Source | Rating |
|---|---|
| Metacritic | 62/100 |
Review scores
| Source | Rating |
| AllMusic | 4/5 stars |
| Billboard | 82/100 |
| The Boston Globe | 70/100 |
| Los Angeles Times | 2/4 stars |
| Rolling Stone | 2/5 stars |
| Slant Magazine | 2/5 stars |

Yes! was met with generally positive reviews from music critics. At Metacritic, which assigns a normalized rating out of 100 to reviews from critics, the album received an average score of 62, which indicates "generally favorable reviews", based on 6 reviews.

Matt Fruchtman of Slant Magazine gave the album two out of five stars, saying "his wide-lens worldview leaves Yes! feeling like the musical equivalent of a G-rated sitcom." Stephen Thomas Erlewine of AllMusic gave the album four out of five stars, saying "The exclamation point that punctuates its title suggests Jason Mraz may be a little enthusiastic on Yes! but that's a feint, hiding how this 2014 record is the next logical step on the singer/songwriter's road of seduction. Gone is the celebrated wordplay, a self-conscious maturation that was perhaps inevitable, but also absent are the smooth soul flourishes of 2012's Love Is a Four Letter Word."

== Commercial performance ==
The album debuted at number two on the Billboard 200 chart, with first-week sales of 102,000 copies in the United States.

In Canada, the album debuted at number two on the Canadian Albums Chart with 12,000 copies, falling behind Rise Against's The Black Market.

== Track listing ==
| No. | Title | Writer(s) | Producer(s) | Length |
|---|---|---|---|---|
| 1. | "Rise" | Jason Mraz, Chaska Potter, Mona Tavakoli, Becky Gebhardt, Mai Bloomfield, Chris Keup, Stewart Myers | Mike Mogis; Mraz | 1:29 |
| 2. | "Love Someone" | Mraz, Potter, Tavakoli, Gebhardt, Bloomfield, Keup, Myers | Mogis; Mraz; Chris Keup^{[a]}; Stewart Myers^{[a]} | 4:16 |
| 3. | "Hello, You Beautiful Thing" | Mraz, Potter, Tavakoli, Gebhardt | Mogis; Mraz | 3:34 |
| 4. | "Long Drive" | Mraz, Potter, Tavakoli, Gebhardt, Bloomfield | Mogis; Mraz | 3:50 |
| 5. | "Everywhere" | Mraz, Potter, Tavakoli, Gebhardt, Bloomfield | Mogis; Mraz | 3:24 |
| 6. | "Best Friend" | Mraz, Potter, Tavakoli, Gebhardt, Bloomfield | Mogis; Mraz | 3:19 |
| 7. | "Quiet" | Mraz, Daniel Omelio, Ammar Malik | Mogis; Mraz; Keup; Myers | 4:18 |
| 8. | "Out of My Hands" | Mraz, Potter, Tavakoli, Gebhardt, Bloomfield | Mogis; Mraz | 3:26 |
| 9. | "It's So Hard to Say Goodbye to Yesterday" | Freddie Perren, Christine Yarian Perren | Mraz | 2:58 |
| 10. | "3 Things" | Mraz, Michael Natter, Nancy Natter, Potter, Tavakoli, Gebhardt, Bloomfield | Mraz; Keup^{[a]}; Myers^{[a]} | 2:54 |
| 11. | "You Can Rely on Me" | Mraz, Potter, Tavakoli, Gebhardt, Bloomfield, Keup, Myers, M. Natter, N. Natter | Mraz; Keup; Myers | 3:43 |
| 12. | "Back to the Earth" | Mraz, Potter, Tavakoli, Gebhardt, Bloomfield | Mogis; Mraz | 3:46 |
| 13. | "A World with You" | Mraz, Myers, Keup | Mogis; Mraz | 4:39 |
| 14. | "Shine" | Mraz, Potter, Tavakoli, Gebhardt, Bloomfield | Mogis; Mraz | 6:04 |

Notes

- ^{^[a]} signifies a co-producer

== Personnel ==
Credits adapted from AllMusic.

- Jason Mraz – vocals, acoustic guitar, electric guitar, Fender Rhodes, piano, synthesizer bass, engineering, mixing, production

Raining Jane

- Mai Bloomfield – cello, glockenspiel, hi-string guitar, marimba, papoose, vocals
- Becky Gebhardt – bass, upright bass, sitar
- Chaska Potter – electric guitar, mandolin, ukulele, vocals
- Mona Tavakoli – drums, percussion, vocals

Additional musicians

- Mike Mogis – banjo, dobro, e-bow, electric guitar, mellotron, pedal steel, synthesizer bass
- Andy Powers – banjo, dobro, acoustic guitar, electric guitar, mandolin, pedal steel
- Ben Brodin – drums, percussion, piano, organ
- Chris Joyner – drones, organ, piano, tanpura
- Nate Walcott – organ, piano, Wurlitzer
- Brian Jones – drums
- John O'Reilly – drums
- Stewart Myers – bass
- Maryann Galewood – handclapping
- Amber Elliot – handclapping
- Ms. Tina – handclapping
- Colin Killalea – inspiration [sic], vocal arrangement
- Regan Sprenkle – vocal arrangement

Technical personnel

- Mike Mogis – engineering, mixing, production
- Chris Keup – engineering, production, additional production
- Stewart Myers – engineering, production, additional production
- Justin Hergett – engineering, mixing assistant
- David Kalish – engineering
- Ben Brodin – assistant engineering
- Tony Maserati – mixing
- James Krausse – mixing assistant
- Chris Gehringer – mastering

Additional personnel

- Tony Corey – production management
- Jeff Nicholas – creative direction
- Sam Riback – A&R
- Douglas Gledhill – design
- Ryan McCann – design
- Patrick Morales – design
- Jen Rosenstein – band photo

== Charts and certifications ==
=== Weekly charts ===
| Chart (2014) | Peak position |
|---|---|
| Australian Albums (ARIA) | 17 |
| Belgian Albums (Ultratop Flanders) | 49 |
| Belgian Albums (Ultratop Wallonia) | 22 |
| Canadian Albums (Billboard) | 2 |
| Danish Albums (Hitlisten) | 14 |
| Dutch Albums (Album Top 100) | 1 |
| French Albums (SNEP) | 36 |
| Hungarian Albums (MAHASZ) | 18 |
| Irish Albums (IRMA) | 58 |
| Italian Albums (FIMI) | 54 |
| New Zealand Albums (RMNZ) | 25 |
| Norwegian Albums (VG-lista) | 24 |
| Scottish Albums (Official Charts) | 31 |
| Spanish Albums (Promusicae) | 14 |
| UK Albums (Official Charts) | 18 |
| US Billboard 200 | 2 |

=== Year-end charts ===
| Chart (2014) | Position |
|---|---|
| Dutch Albums (Album Top 100) | 97 |
| US Billboard 200 | 143 |

=== Certifications ===
| Region | Certification | Certified units/sales |
|---|---|---|
| Brazil (Pro-Música Brasil) | Diamond | 160,000^{‡} |
| Canada (Music Canada) | Gold | 40,000^{^} |
^{^} Shipments figures based on certification alone.^{‡} Sales+streaming figures based on certification alone.

== Release history ==
| Region | Date | Format | Label |
|---|---|---|---|
| United Kingdom | July 11, 2014 | CD, digital download | Atlantic Records |
| United States | July 15, 2014 | CD, digital download | Atlantic Records |
