= The Woman I Love (song) =

Single by Jason Mraz

from the album Love Is a Four Letter Word
- Released: February 4, 2013
- Recorded: 2011
- Genre: Pop rock, country pop
- Length: 3:10
- Label: Atlantic
- Songwriters: Jason Mraz, David Hodges
- Producer: Joe Chiccarelli

Jason Mraz singles chronology
"93 Million Miles" (2012)	"The Woman I Love" (2013)	"Everybody's Got Somebody but Me" (2013)

"The Woman I Love" is a song by American singer-songwriter Jason Mraz. It was released as the third official single from his fourth studio album, Love Is a Four Letter Word (2012), on February 4, 2013. It was written by Mraz and David Hodges, and produced by Joe Chiccarelli. "The Woman I Love" is a pop rock ballad, with country pop influences and talks about reminding a woman of how special she is, expressing unconditional love, commitment and faithfulness.

== Background and release ==
After his activist outings during 2010-2011, Mraz felt inspired to write an album and told that it was based around the theme of love. However, he realized that the fundamentals of making "an album about love" took some time and hard work. "I thought it would be pretty easy as a songwriter to always write through a filter of love," Mraz told Jam! Canoe. "But the challenges at first were trying to write songs about love from the heart that weren't cheesy. What I learned quickly was that when a song was cheesy, it usually just came from the mind. It usually came from the craft of songwriting which anyone can do. So what I needed was experience, things that were going to rip my heart open to show me what I'm made of."

"The Woman I Love" was released as the third single from "Love Is a Four Letter Word" on February 4, 2013, on iTunes. The single includes the "Original Version" of the song and its music video.

== Composition ==
"The Woman I Love" was written by Jason Mraz and David Hodges, while production was handled by Joe Chiccarelli. It is a pop rock song with country pop influences. "With my hand behind you, I will catch you if you fall. Yeah, I’m gonna love you like the woman I love," he sings. Lyrically, it acknowledges that any relationship has occasional annoyances, but these aren't enough to prompt Mraz to give up on it.

Mraz further explained the track, in a "track-by-track" commentary for Billboard:

"I try to keep my music gender neutral, but this is obvious, it's called 'The Woman I Love,' but I'd like to dedicate to the men in the relationships because every so often the woman forgets her own greatness and she goes a little bat sh-- crazy sometimes. So its up to the other half to love that person back into the person we know them to be. That's basically what this song's about."

== Critical and commercial reception ==
The song received mixed reviews from music critics. Nikita Ramkissoon of Times LIVE called its lyrics, "quite silly and soppy."

== Music video ==
The music video for the song was directed by Elliott Sellers with graphics by Blend Studios, and was released on February 4, 2013. The video is the result of an unprecedented online contest where Twitter users were invited to answer the question, "What does 'The Woman I Love' mean to you?." More than 10,000 responses followed, tweeted, in 140 characters or less. The best of those submissions were then used to inspire the storyboarding and overall video concept. Users whose ideas are featured in "The Woman I Love" are credited by Twitter handle.

== Track listing ==
- Digital download
1. "The Woman I Love" – 3:10

== Chart performance ==
Chart (2013)	Peak position
South Korea (GAON)	59
