= Charlatan (album) =

Studio album by Victorian Halls
- Released: August 16, 2011
- Studio: Cameron Webb, Los Angeles
- Genre: Alternative rock, indie
- Length: 39:44
- Label: Victory Records
- Producer: Victorian Halls

Victorian Halls chronology
Charlatan (2011)	Hyperalgesia (2015)

Singles from Victorian Halls
- 1. "A Crush is a Crush" Released: 2011; 2. "It All Started In The Hall" Released: 2012; 3. "La Di Da" Released: 2013; 4. "So Ambitious" Released: 2014

Charlatan is the debut studio album by American alternative rock band Victorian Halls. The 12-track album was recorded in Los Angeles in Cameron Webb's recording studio and released on 16 August 2011 by Victory Records. The vinyl version of Charlatan was released on white-and-green marbled record, with a number of copies featuring an etching on the inner ring of the disc, as an inside joke, of the band professing their producer's love for Justin Bieber. To promote the album, the band issued an interactive e-card containing a preview of each track from their new record.

The cover art for the album was painted by Chelsea Greene Lewyta, a freelance avant-garde illustrator living in New York City, US.

== Track listing ==
All tracks are written by Victorian Halls, except where noted

No.	Title	Length
1.	"Girls Kiss Girls"	3:37
2.	"Glass Depth Mood"	2:59
3.	"Burn Me Up Like a Wax-Kissed Letter"	3:47
4.	"A Crush Is A Crush"	3:01
5.	"Black Maria"	3:38
6.	"Upper East Side"	3:27
7.	"La Di Da"	3:31
8.	"Sugar Champagne"	2:07
9.	"It All Started In The Hall"	4:25
10.	"Lucky 16"	1:25
11.	"Dear, This Is Desperate"	3:41
12.	"Martini Elegance"	4:06
