= Have It All (Jason Mraz song) =

2018 single by Jason Mraz

Single by Jason Mraz

from the album Know
- Released: April 27, 2018
- Recorded: 2017
- Genre: Reggae fusion
- Length: 3:46
- Label: Atlantic
- Songwriters: Jason Mraz; David Hodges; Jacob Kasher Hindlin; Mona Tavakoli; Chaska Lela Potter; Mai Sunshine Bloomfield; Rebecca Emily Gebhardt
- Producers: Hodges; Wells; Kasher

Jason Mraz singles chronology
"Love Someone" (2014)	"Have It All" (2018)	"Unlonely" (2018)

Music video
- Have It All on YouTube

"Have It All" is a song by American singer-songwriter Jason Mraz. It was released on April 27, 2018, by Atlantic Records as the lead single from his sixth studio album, Know (2018).

== Background ==
Mraz said: "‘Have It All’ stood out as a song with a hopeful message to help me heal and move forward; a song with a message of generosity—the antithesis of despondency," "It’s a blessing disguised as a rap song, and it’s meant to be paid forward and shared.”

The song speaks of life’s limitless possibilities of hope, togetherness, affection, friendship, intimacy, and beyond. And lyrics convey a dream for another, a hopeful dream to not just know about life but live life to the fullest.

== Music video ==
The accompanying music video was shot in Mraz's hometown of Richmond, Virginia. It begins with Mraz waking up and stepping onto a balcony as a cheerful radio announcer speaking of a "beautiful day" and encouraging listeners to "Get out there and say 'hi' to [their] neighbor." There are then various clips of Mraz dancing down the street, riding a Segway scooter with a group of tourists and playing with a group of musicians in a trolley car. Mraz then arrives at a middle school and leads a Flash Mob of students into an assembly. The video continues with everyone dancing in the school yard and gymnasium, and concludes with a clip of Mraz and a young girl singing an acoustic version of the song.

== Charts ==
=== Weekly charts ===
Weekly chart performance
Chart (2018)	Peak position
Belgium (Ultratip Bubbling Under Flanders)	12
Belgium (Ultratip Bubbling Under Wallonia)	26
Canada AC (Billboard)	21
Canada Hot AC (Billboard)	28
Japan Hot 100 (Billboard)	88
Netherlands (Single Tip)	20
New Zealand Heatseekers (RMNZ)	8
US Billboard Hot 100	90
US Adult Contemporary (Billboard)	14
US Adult Pop Airplay (Billboard)	10

=== Year-end charts ===
Annual chart rankings
Chart (2018)	Position
Iceland (Plötutíóindi)	72
Netherlands Airplay (Airplay Top 40)	86
Taiwan (Hito Radio)	40
US Adult Contemporary (Billboard)	35
US Adult Top 40 (Billboard)	32

== Certifications ==
Region	Certification	Certified units/sales
Canada (Music Canada)	Gold	40,000^{‡}
New Zealand (RMNZ)	Gold	15,000^{‡}
United States (RIAA)	Platinum	1,000,000^{‡}
^{‡} Sales+streaming figures based on certification alone.
