= Victorian Halls =

Musical group from the United States

- Victorian Halls in their 2015 line-up: (from left to right); Jordan Dismuke, Mike Tomala, Sean Lenart

Background information
- Origin: Chicago, Illinois
- Genres: Alternative rock, Indie
- Years active: 2006–present
- Label: Victory Records
- Members: Sean Lenart; Jordan Dismuke; Mike Tomala
- Past members: Carlos Luna
- Website: victorianhalls.com

Victorian Halls are an American alternative rock band originating from Chicago, Illinois, United States.

== History ==
Chicago trio Victorian Halls, headed by the lead singer Sean Lenart, have been playing the Chicago underground music scene for years before they recorded their first two records, EP "Springteen" (2007) and the self-titled 'Octo' EP "Victorian Halls" (2010), both as self-releases. The third EP, "Crystal Lenses" (2011) was already recorded and pressed, but subsequently shelved, due to the group getting signed to Victory Records prior to its release.

Band's debut studio album titled "Charlatan" was released on Victory Records in August 2011. The album was recorded in Los Angeles in Cameron Webb's recording studio.

Their second full-length studio album, "Hyperalgesia" was recorded in Gossip Studios, Chicago, and released in May 2015 with help of prolific music producer and mixer Joe Chiccarelli, who has in the past produced dozens of albums for well-known acts and singers (The Strokes, The Killers, U2, Jason Mraz). The band promoted the material from their new release on their “All My Friends Are Dead” Tour (name taken from the lyrics of the first track of the album “All My Friends”) throughout September 2016.

In November 2015 the group released a Christmas-themed song titled “This Holiday”.

The group tours regularly, since 2006 performing yearly and playing more than 85 concerts at multiple venues across the US, either headlining as a main act or, mainly prior 2010, appearing as a supporting band. The band's latest tour was a string of SouthEast US shows staged between 3–11 May 2017.

The remix of their own song "Glass Depth Mood" titled "So Ambitious (GDM Remix)" was included in the soundtracks for the video games Watch Dogs and Steep.

== Musical style ==
While the group's first major release, Charlatan, was dominated by rough, punk-rock-like tunes, underlined by Sean Lenart's distinctive, shrill vocals (described by one of the critics as "having reached the heights other lead singers don't even know they exist"), the following studio album, Hyperalgesia, while maintaining the overall characteristic experimental-rock feel of Victorian Halls' music, is a much more mature-rock affair with many great, original songs, that however (perhaps with the exception of the track "Most Firearms Are More Than Adequate in Killing an Undead Brain") lack that unmistakable, fresh roughness of the debut album.

== Members ==
Present

- Sean Lenart - lead vocals/lead guitar/piano (2006–present)
- Jordan Dismuke - bass guitar (2011–present)
- Michael Tomala - drums (2006–present)

Live

- Phil Battaglia - drums/backing vocals (2015-2017)
- Luke Harvey - lead guitar (2015)

Former

- Carlos Luna – electronic keyboard, vocals (2006–2011)

== Discography ==
Victorian Halls discography
- Studio albums: 2
- EPs: 2
- Singles: 9
- Music videos: 7

=== Studio ===
Year	Album details
2011	Charlatan: Released: 16 August 2011; Label: Victory Records; Format: CD, music download
2015	Hyperalgesia: Released: 19 May 2015; Label: Victory Records; Format: CD, music download

=== EP ===
Year	Album details
2007	Springsteen: Released: 1 March 2007; Label: Self Released; Format: CD, music download
2010	Victorian Halls: Released: 28 February 2010; Label: Self Released; Format: CD, Music download

=== Singles ===
Year	Single	Album
2011	"A Crush is a Crush"	Charlatan
2012	"It All Started In The Hall"	Charlatan
2013	"La Di Da"	Charlatan
2014	"So Ambitious"	Charlatan
2015	"Tonight Only The Dead"	Hyperalgesia
2015	"Come in with the Storm"	Hyperalgesia
2015	"This Holiday"	N/A
2016	"Scarlets"	Hyperalgesia
2017	"Dissolution"	Hyperalgesia

=== Music Videos ===
2011	"A Crush is a Crush"	Charlatan
2012	"It All Started In The Hall"	Charlatan
2013	"La Di Da"	Charlatan
2015	"Tonight Only The Dead"	Hyperalgesia
2015	"Come in with the Storm"	Hyperalgesia
2016	"Scarlets"	Hyperalgesia
2017	"Dissolution"	Hyperalgesia
