= Know (album) =

Studio album by Jason Mraz
- Released: August 10, 2018
- Recorded: 2017–2018
- Genre: Pop rock
- Length: 36:27
- Label: Atlantic

Jason Mraz chronology
Yes! (2014)	Know (2018)	Look for the Good (2020)

Singles from Know
- 1. "Have It All" Released: April 27, 2018; 2. "Unlonely" Released: June 14, 2018(Google Maps; TN, MS, AR); 3. "Might As Well Dance" Released: July 6, 2018; 4. "More than Friends" Released: October 8, 2018

Know is the sixth studio album by American singer-songwriter Jason Mraz. The album was released on August 10, 2018 by Atlantic Records. The album's lead single "Have It All" was released on April 27, 2018, accompanied by a video filmed with performing arts students from his hometown of Richmond. The video for the third track released on July 6, 2018, "Might as Well Dance", features footage shot at Mraz's wedding.

The album is a further collaboration between Jason Mraz and the members of indie-rock-folk band Raining Jane: Mai Bloomfield, Becky Gebhardt, Chaska Potter and Mona Tavakoli, with whom Mraz has been working since 2007, and who were his backing band on his previous album Yes!. The band returns to back him on Know and helped in writing a number of songs as well. The album peaked at number 9 on the US Billboard 200 chart.

== Commercial performance ==
In the United States, Know debuted at number nine on the US Billboard 200 with 33,000 album-equivalent units, which included 26,000 pure album sales. It is Mraz's fifth top-ten album in the country.

== Track listing ==
Know track listing
No.	Title	Writer(s)	Producer(s)	Length
1.	"Let's See What the Night Can Do"	Jason Mraz; Jon Green	Andrew Wells	4:05
2.	"Have It All"	Mraz; David Hodges; Jacob Kasher Hindlin; Mona Tavakoli; Chaska Lela Potter; Mai Sunshine Bloomfield; Rebecca Emily Gebhardt	Hodges; Wells; Kasher	3:46
3.	"More than Friends" (featuring Meghan Trainor)	Mraz; Green; Wells; Meghan Trainor	Wells	3:01
4.	"Unlonely"	Mraz; Scott Harris; Emily Warren	Wells	3:51
5.	"Better with You"	Mraz; John Alagía; Tofer Brown	Alagia; Wells	2:41
6.	"No Plans"	Mraz; Ammar Malik	Wells	2:28
7.	"Sleeping to Dream"	Mraz; Peter Stuart	Wells	3:42
8.	"Making It Up"	Mraz; Bob Schneider	Wells; Jalhay	2:53
9.	"Might as Well Dance"	Mraz	André de Santanna; Wells^{[a]}	3:56
10.	"Love Is Still the Answer"	Mraz; Dan Wilson	Wilson; John Sinclair^{[a]}; Brian W. Brundage^{[a]}	6:06

Japanese bonus tracks
No.	Title	Writer(s)	Length
11.	"The Other Side"	Mraz; Michael Pollack; Michael Matosic	2:53
12.	"Have It All" (Easy Star All-Stars & Michael Goldwasser Reggae Mix)	Mraz; Hodges; Hindlin; Tavakoli; Potter; Bloomfield; Gebhardt	4:20
Total length:			43:45

Notes

- ^a signifies an additional producer

== Personnel ==
- Jason Mraz – vocals, acoustic guitar
- Andrew Wells – production, engineering, electric guitar, acoustic guitar, piano, organ, percussion
- Rob Humphreys – drums, percussion
- Sean Hurley – bass
- Eric Ruscinski – piano, organ, acoustic guitar
- Drew Taubenfeld – pedal steel, acoustic guitar
- Tony Maserati – mixing
- Andre de Santanna – production, engineering, bass
- Leo Costa – drums, percussion
- Molly Miller – electric guitar
- Daniel Mandelman – piano, organ, wurlitzer
- Pedro Collini – percussion
- Carlos Sosa – saxophone
- Raul Vallejo – trombone
- Fernado Castillo – trumpet
- Todd Spadafore – organ

Raining Jane

- Mai Bloomfield – vocals
- Becky Gebhardt – writing
- Chaska Potter – vocals
- Mona Tavakoli – vocals

== Charts ==
Chart performance for Know
Chart (2018)	Peak position
Australian Albums (ARIA)	39
Austrian Albums (Ö3 Austria)	24
Belgian Albums (Ultratop Flanders)	28
Belgian Albums (Ultratop Wallonia)	46
Canadian Albums (Billboard)	10
Dutch Albums (Album Top 100)	5
German Albums (Offizielle Top 100)	27
Hungarian Albums (MAHASZ)	15
Japan Hot Albums (Billboard Japan)	11
Japanese Albums (Oricon)	22
Norwegian Albums (VG-lista)	37
Scottish Albums (OCC)	46
South Korean Albums (Gaon)	30
Spanish Albums (PROMUSICAE)	26
Swiss Albums (Schweizer Hitparade)	14
UK Albums (OCC)	46
US Billboard 200	9

== Certifications ==
Region	Certification	Certified units/sales
Brazil (Pro-Música Brasil)	3× Platinum	120,000^{‡}
^{‡} Sales+streaming figures based on certification alone.

== Release history ==
Release history and formats for Know
Region	Date	Format	Label
Various	August 10, 2018	CD, digital download	Atlantic
