= The Bloom and the Blight =

Studio album by Two Gallants
- Released: September 4, 2012
- Genre: Indie rock
- Length: 33:23
- Label: ATO
- Producer: John Congleton; Adam Stephens; Tyson Vogel

Two Gallants chronology
Two Gallants (2007)	The Bloom and the Blight (2012)	We Are Undone (2015)

Professional ratings
Aggregate scores
Source	Rating
AnyDecentMusic?	6.5/10
Metacritic	71/100
Review scores
Source	Rating
AllMusic	4/5 stars
American Songwriter	3.5/5 stars
The A.V. Club	B−
Consequence of Sound	C+
Drowned in Sound	7/10
Pitchfork	5.5/10
PopMatters	7/10 stars
Tiny Mix Tapes	3/5 marks

The Bloom and the Blight is the fourth full-length album from the band Two Gallants, released on September 4, 2012. It follows up their self-titled album, Two Gallants, which was released on September 25, 2007. A streaming version of the full album was made available on August 27, 2012, by Rolling Stone magazine.

== Track listing ==
1. "Halcyon Days"
2. "Song of Songs"
3. "My Love Won't Wait"
4. "Broken Eyes"
5. "Ride Away"
6. "Decay"
7. "Winter's Youth"
8. "Willie"
9. "Cradle Pyre"
10. "Sunday Souvenirs"
