= Two Gallants (album) =

Studio album by Two Gallants
- Released: September 25, 2007
- Recorded: April 18–30, 2007
- Genre: Indie rock Lo-fi
- Length: 44:05
- Label: Saddle Creek
- Producer: Alex Newport; Adam Brinkman Stephens Fontaine; Tyson Dillingham Corvidae

Two Gallants chronology
The Scenery of Farewell (EP) (2007)	Two Gallants (2007)	The Bloom and the Blight (2012)

Professional ratings
Aggregate scores
Source	Rating
Metacritic	69/100
Review scores
Source	Rating
AllGigs	5/5 stars
AllMusic	4/5 stars
Pitchfork Media	6.9/10
Rockfeedback	4/5 stars

Two Gallants is the third full-length studio album from the band Two Gallants, released on September 25, 2007. It follows up their EP, The Scenery of Farewell, which was released in June.

== Track listing ==
1. "The Deader"
2. "Miss Meri"
3. "The Hand That Held Me Down"
4. "Trembling of the Rose"
5. "Reflections of the Marionette"
6. "Ribbons Round My Tongue"
7. "Despite What You've Been Told"
8. "Fly Low Carrion Crow"
9. "My Baby's Gone"

Includes "Liza Jane" as a bonus track on some releases.
