= Two Gallants (band) =

American guitar/drum duo

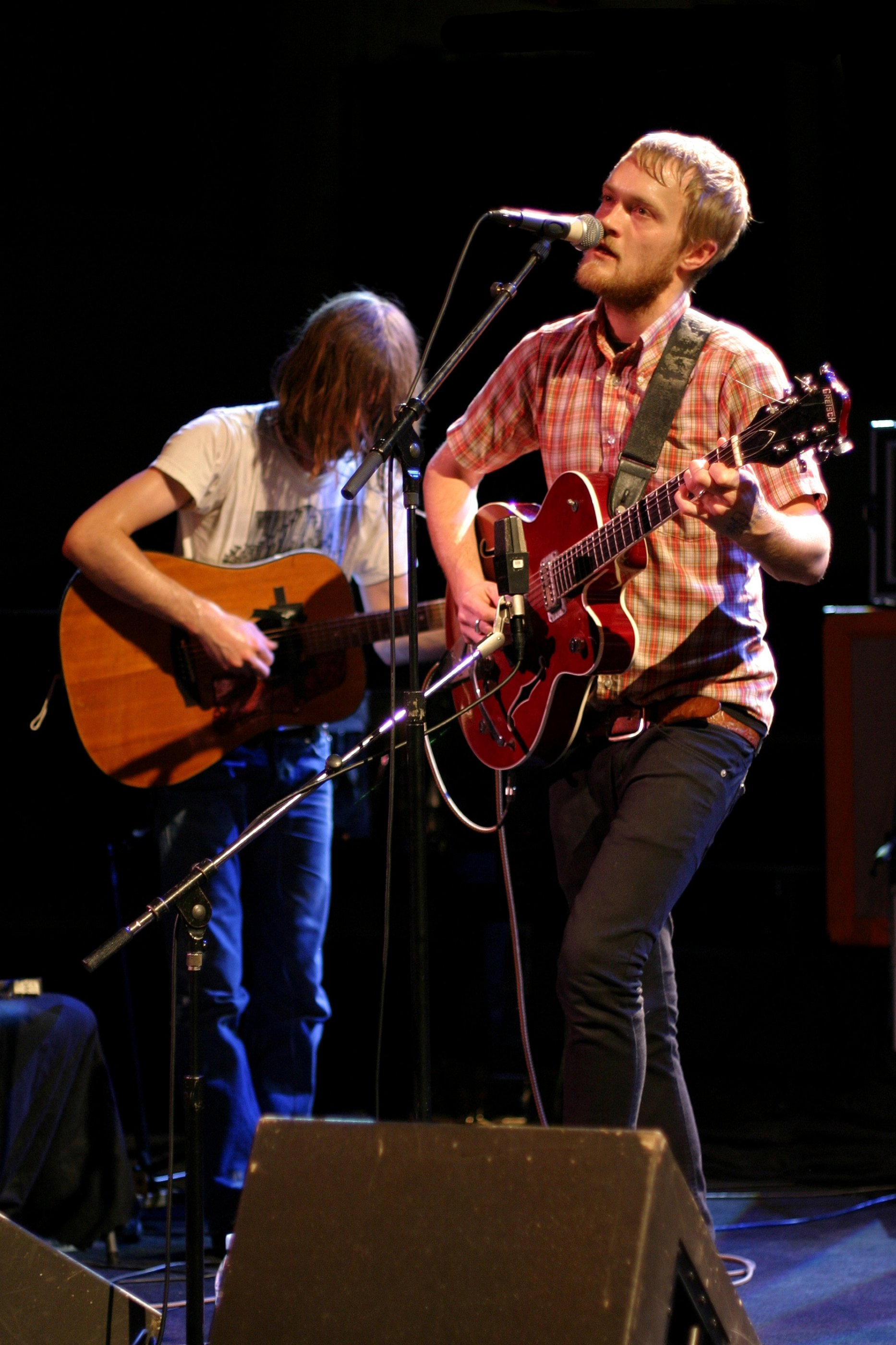
- Two Gallants performing in Paris, 2007

Background information
- Origin: San Francisco, California, United States
- Genres: Indie rock Lo-fi; Folk rock Blues rock
- Years active: 2002–present
- Labels: Saddle Creek; Alive Records; ATO Records; MapleMusic Recordings (Canada)
- Members: Adam Stephens; Tyson Vogel
- Website: Two Gallants

Two Gallants were a guitar/drum duo from San Francisco, California. Consisting of Adam Stephens (guitar, harmonica, keyboards, piano, vocals) and Tyson Vogel (drums, guitar, vocals), the band formed in 2002. Two Gallants are often described as punk and blues-infused folk rock, with the band's sound developing deeper into rock and roll on later releases. The band has released five studio albums, two EPs, and several singles since 2004 as well as touring extensively.

== History ==
=== Formation and The Throes (2002–04) ===
Adam Stephens and Tyson Vogel became friends while growing up in San Francisco, meeting first at the age of five and becoming friends when they were twelve years old. Each had received a guitar around the same time, and the two soon began making music together. Initially covering heavy metal bands and the exploding grunge sound of the 1990s, the two discovered blues music independent of each other when they were around eighteen. The blues would make a lasting impression on them and their desire to make music.

Stephens and Vogel played various instruments in various bands both together and separately throughout high school, but parted ways after graduation, with Vogel attending art school in Portland, Oregon. Around 2002, when they were about twenty-one, the pair decided to just make music together, plugging Stephens' guitar into Vogel's bass amp in order to play bass lines with melodies. The name Two Gallants was chosen after a short story of the same name from James Joyce's Dubliners, as both were reading the book at the time and the name "seemed obvious". With Stephens on guitar, harmonica, and lead vocals and Vogel on drums and vocals, Two Gallants began playing house shows around the Bay area and busking outside BART subway stations, particularly the stop at 16th and Mission.

Two Gallants released their debut album, The Throes, on Alive Records in the summer of 2004. Recorded in only nine days, The Throes was a critical success, with Pitchfork's Jonathan Zwickel calling the album "an electric, unforgettable listen," saying further, "Suffering only in its somewhat understated production, The Throes could be considered a masterpiece of new American roots music. It's a heavy emotional investment, a struggle of the most fulfilling kind," and giving it a rating of 8.5 out of 10. The Throes showcases Stephen's songwriting style, writing lyrics with influence from the blues. Songs on this and future albums would touch on social and personal issues such as domestic violence, suicide, abandonment, alcoholism, and references to fables of the Old West and antebellum South. The band released a 7" vinyl single, "I'm Her Man", and expanded touring to support The Throes.

=== What the Toll Tells and Two Gallants (2005–08) ===
Two Gallants signed a record deal with Omaha, Nebraska's independent label Saddle Creek Records in early July 2005. That same month the band began recording the followup to The Throes at Tiny Telephone Studios in San Francisco. In August of that year, Two Gallants played their first shows overseas in London as well as the Reading and Leeds Festivals, and appeared at Saddle Creek's CMJ showcase at New York City's Bowery Ballroom.

The band's second album, What the Toll Tells, was released in February 2006 on Saddle Creek. What the Toll Tells was recorded in three weeks and continued to mix the punk/folk rock sound with blues, and Stephens's lyrics carried on similar themes from The Throes: domestic violence, the Old West, racism, alcoholism, and the perceived myth of the American dream. Two singles were released from the album, "Las Cruces Jail" and "Steady Rollin'". Overall What the Toll Tells received a "weighted average" score of 71 out of 100 on review aggregation site Metacritic, indicating "generally favorable reviews". The album's storytelling did receive some harsh criticism from some critics, with Brian Howe from Pitchfork saying the music "handles history like costume jewelry" and giving the album a 4.5 out of 10, and a writer for Under the Radar said of the album, "Everything sung here is manufactured to conjure up the same bullshit sense of nostalgia that the band's James Joyce-inspired name is supposed to." On the other hand, Sharon O'Connell of the BBC's Collective magazine praised this aspect of the album, saying the music "brims with an almost brutal rawness and betrays the pair’s striking talent for storytelling".

Two Gallants toured Europe at the start of 2006 after the album release, played the Saddle Creek SXSW showcase in March, and then toured the United States and parts of Canada throughout the spring, back to Europe for summer festivals, and another tour of the United States in the fall of that year, in total playing over 200 shows in 2006. During the fall tour the band gained music press attention for an incident at a performance in Houston, Texas, when a police officer investigating a noise complaint at the club Walter's on Washington allegedly attacked the band and several fans present with a Taser. The band continued to write and perform new material throughout the 2006 tour, sometimes taking months to get a song down while playing it live. Two Gallants began recording songs during interviews and soundchecks that they intended to be their next album. These songs were primarily acoustic, with sparse drums and occasional piano. After completing nine songs, the band decided the album was too dark, depressing and "heavy," releasing five of the songs as The Scenery of Farewell EP on Saddle Creek in July 2007.

Two Gallants, the band's third full-length album, was released in September 2007 on Saddle Creek and debuted at number 29 on Billboard's Top Heatseeker's Chart. Produced by Alex Newport and Two Gallants at Hyde Street Studios and mixed at Talking House Productions, the band's eponymous album was noted for being much more sonically rich than previous albums while still retaining the same basic guitar/drum sound and storytelling themes, though Two Gallants has more personal themes of love, loss and absence rather than the social themes found on What the Toll Tells. Two Gallants received a score of 69 out of 100 on Metacritic, "generally favorable reviews". A writer for Alternative Press remarked that "their take on Delta blues and twisted folk is continually spot-on, going down equally well with a bad breakup or a cold beer with pals." Amanda Petrusich of Pitchfork gave the album 6.9 out of 10, praising the album for "musically...offer[ing] the same blend of pseudo-Americana the band built its reputation on: a grainy mix of classic blues, folk, and electric guitar" but critiquing Stephens' lyrics, calling the writing "ambitious, heady, and riddled with histrionics". Two Gallants made their network television debut, appearing on Jimmy Kimmel Live! to perform "Despite What You've Been Told," and the band toured throughout the fall of 2007 and into the spring and summer of 2008 in support of the album.

=== Hiatus (2008–12) ===
After six years of constant recording and touring, Two Gallants took a hiatus starting in the summer of 2008, citing exhaustion both mentally and physically. Stephens and Vogel both spent the time writing material on their own. Stephens released his debut solo album, We Live on Cliffs, in September 2010 on Saddle Creek Records. We Live on Cliffs received mixed reviews, with many reviewers noting that the album was not bad but lacked the drive that Two Gallants records had. Vogel formed an instrumental group called Devotionals with violinist Anton Patzner, cellist Lewis Patzner, Andrew Maguire on vibraphone, and drummer Jeff Blair. Devotionals is essentially a solo project, with Vogel writing and performing the songs. Devotionals released a self-titled album in 2010 on Alive Records. The hiatus was intended to take only around a year or so while the two worked on solo material to find their own directions, but was extended to such a length due to Vogel dealing with personal issues and Stephens being injured in an auto accident while on tour for We Live on Cliffs in 2011. The van in which Stephens and tourmates were travelling in flipped several times, pinning Stephens' shoulder against the roof of the van and severely dislocating it. Stephens was unable to even hold a guitar for several months afterward, and the band was finally able to reunite in early 2012.

=== The Bloom and Blight (2012) ===
After almost a five-year break between albums, Two Gallants released their fourth album, The Bloom and the Blight, on September 4, 2012 on ATO Records. Produced by John Congleton, The Bloom and the Blight is notably much heavier, with a more pronounced loud/soft dynamic than their previous work. The album received a score of 71 out of 100 on Metacritic for "generally favorable reviews". AllMusic's Mark Deming described the band's new sound as "still clearly the work of just two musicians, and the performances reveal elements of the formal elegance of their early work, as if the grand scale of the sound has only reinforced the dynamics of the two-man band" and that the "music is as intimate as ever, and all the more powerful for it".

=== We Are Undone (2015) ===
We Are Undone, Two Gallants' fifth studio album and second for ATO Records, was released in February 2015 and was available for live streaming in its entirety on The New York Times' website. Unlike the songs on the first four albums, We Are Undone was written almost entirely in the studio. The album was written and recorded at Panoramic House studio in rural Stinson Beach, California, a house converted into a studio where the band also stayed while recording. Previously the band wrote songs and worked them out while playing shows, sometimes over the course of years, but writing and recording simultaneously was "really refreshing," according to Stephens. We Are Undone continued in the style of The Bloom and Blight, focusing on a stripped-down sound and loud/soft dynamic shifts, moving further away from the punk-inspired blues of earlier records more into rock and roll. Similar to The Bloom and Blight, critics continued to either praise this shift in sound or wish for the narratives and songwriting of previous albums. Zwickel from Pitchfork observed that "in its often inchoate roar, We Are Undone bears little resemblance to the laser-focus punk-blues of their earlier work. The songs just aren't as good." However, Neil McCormack from The Telegraph noted that "stylistic breadth and dynamic shifts make up for the stark brutality of their sound" and that "there is compassion and intelligence at work in songs of hard lives lived on the edge of collapse, romantically, financially and socially." We Are Undone receiving a weighted average score of 68 out of 100 on Metacritic, "generally favorable reviews" as their previous three releases received.

=== Second hiatus (2016- ) ===
After finishing the US and Europe tour supporting We Are Undone there was next to no official word from the band until September 2016. A statement on their Facebook page read "Our apologies for being out of touch for a while. Last winter, after a few years of seemingly ceaseless touring, we decided to take a little break and set aside some time for other things. Actually, it was more of an unspoken inaction than any proper decision. It wasn’t anything that seemed worthy of announcing at the time and it still isn’t. We just wanted to say hello and tell those of you who’ve written that we have been keeping up and reading your messages. We miss you too. No news for now, but we do both have a few other projects going on so keep your ears open." The page has given a few updates on Tyson Vogel's new project Devotionals since then but no word about Adam Stephens or the future of the band as of September 2023.

== Music ==
=== Musical style and influence ===
Two Gallants's earlier recordings were often characterized by critics as some form of folk or blues inspired rock. The band often repurposed old blues melodies and lyrics into songs and the lyrics and themes of the music tied into those often found in the blues. Stephens' fingerpicking guitar style and bass lines were also considered to be a part of the band's signature sound. The bass line to Stephens' guitar melodies is achieved by running his guitar through a bass amp to fill out the sound of the music. The band's sound through the first three records heavily reflects the blues and punk influence on the music.

After the band's hiatus from 2008 to 2012, the duo regrouped and the new songs were more stripped down, focused, louder, and "heavier" than the previous work. The focus of the lyrics remained the same, but the song structures shifted. The guitar work featured more power chords and shifts in loud/soft dynamic instead of fingerpicking for dramatic effect. This shift in sound on The Bloom and the Blight and We Are Undone reflects the music the band grew up listening to, such as Nirvana, Pavement, and Operation Ivy, instead of being dominated by the blues records that the two discovered in their late teens.

== Discography ==
=== Albums ===
- The Throes (2004, Alive Records)
- What the Toll Tells (2006, Saddle Creek)
- Two Gallants (2007, Saddle Creek)
- The Bloom and the Blight (September 4, 2012, ATO Records)
- We Are Undone (February 3, 2015, ATO Records)

=== Singles & EPs ===
==== EPs ====
- Nothing to You (re-mix) + 3 (2006, Alive Records)
- The Scenery of Farewell (2007, Saddle Creek)

==== Singles ====
- "I'm Her Man" (2004, Alive Records)
- "Las Cruces Jail" (2005, Saddle Creek)
- "Steady Rollin'" (2006, Saddle Creek)
