= Hell and Back =

Hell and Back or Hell and Back Again or To Hell and Back may refer to:

== Books ==
- Hell and Back (comics), a 1999–2000 comic book series
- To Hell and Back (Murphy book), a 1949 autobiography of soldier and actor Audie Murphy
- To Hell and Back (Kershaw book), 2015 history book by Ian Kershaw
- Meat Loaf: To Hell and Back, a 2004 autobiography of Meat Loaf, or its film adaptation

== Film and TV ==
- Hell and Back (film), a 2015 animated comedy film
- To Hell and Back (film), a 1955 film adaptation of Audie Murphy's autobiography
- Uno di più all'inferno, a 1968 film also known as To Hell and Back
- "To Hell and Back", a 1996 episode of American Gothic

== Music ==
=== Albums ===
- Hell and Back (album), by Drag-On, 2004
- To Hell and Back (album), by Sinergy, 2000
- To Hell 'n' Back, by Grong Grong, 2009
- To Hell and Back, by Nemesis, 1988

=== Songs ===
- "To Hell & Back" (song), by Maren Morris, 2020
- "Hell n Back", by Bakar, 2019
- "Hell and Back", by Metallica from Beyond Magnetic, 2011
- "To Hell & Back", by Blessthefall from Witness, 2009
- "To Hell and Back", by Iron Fire from Beyond the Void, 2019
- "To Hell and Back", by Sabaton from Heroes, 2014
- "To Hell and Back", by Symphony X from Underworld, 2015
- "To Hell and Back", by Venom from Black Metal, 1982

== Other ==
- To Hell and Back (video game), a platform game developed for the Commodore 64
- To Hell and Back (Mayfair Games), a 1993 role-playing game supplement

== See also ==
- Hell and Back Again, a 2011 film
- "To Hull and Back", a 1985 Christmas special episode of the BBC sitcom Only Fools and Horses
- Katabasis, the mythological concept of literally journeying into and returning from the underworld
