= The Jacks (band) =

THE JACKS
- Origin: Los Angeles, CA
- Genres: Rock Music; Indie Rock; Alternative Rock
- Years active: 2016–present
- Labels: Edgeout Records; Universal Music Group
- Members: Jonny Stanback; Tom Hunter; Scott Stone; Josh Roossin
- Website: www.thejacksofficial.com

The Jacks are an American rock band formed in Los Angeles, California in 2016. The group was founded by Tom Hunter (lead guitar, vocals) and Scott Stone (bass guitar, vocals) who had been friends since childhood. Jonny Stanback (lead vocals, rhythm guitar) joined after college and Josh Roossin (drums, percussion) joined the following year.

In 2017, the band won a recording contract at the Los Angeles regionals of the KLOS-FM Next2Rock competition. However, the prize was declined by the band and they elected to wait for a contract with Edgeout Records, which they received in January 2019.

PopMatters premiered their track, "Hello My Friend," on February 8, 2018. Atwood Magazine also premiered their single, "Tonight," in 2018.

The video for their single, "Walk Away," premiered on Billboard on Jun 21, 2019. It came from their debut, self-titled EP, released June 28, 2019. The album was produced by Matt Wallace and mixed by Andrew Scheps at Los Angeles’ Sunset Sound Recorders.

They performed at the 2019 NFL Super Bowl pre-party, at the debut Sonic Temple art & music festival, and as part of Ringo Starr’s Peace & Love birthday event.

In November 2019, the band released a holiday single, a rock version of "In the Bleak Midwinter," based on an 1872 work by English poet Christina Rossetti.

In advance of their second EP, Remember You, the group released a lyric video for their track "Just A Little Bit." The EP was released on March 6, 2020, and featured the single and video "Threw It All Away." It was produced by Grammy Award-winner Joe Chiccarelli. Following up that release in April, guitarist Tom Hunter was featured in Guitar World Magazine teaching guitarists how to play the riffs he performed on that track.
