= The Throes (album) =

Studio album by Two Gallants
- Released: May 18, 2004
- Genre: Indie rock, lo-fi
- Length: 53:53
- Label: Alive
- Producer: Jeffrey Saltzman

Two Gallants chronology
| The Throes (2004) | What the Toll Tells (2006) |

Professional ratings
Review scores
| Source | Rating |
|---|---|
| AllMusic | 4/5 stars |
| Pitchfork | (8.5/10) |
| PopMatters | Favorable |
| Rolling Stone | 3/5 stars |

The Throes is the debut album by indie rock duo Two Gallants released in 2004 (see 2004 in music).

The album was remastered and released as The Throes Remix on December 12, 2006, on vinyl. It also included a bonus track called "Anna's Sweater" a cover of song by a defunct San Francisco band Blear that was originally recorded for a compilation called ny2lon. The first press of 500 vinyl records were pressed with "Mother's Blues" as the bonus track, the tracklist and center label are misprinted with "Anna's Sweater."

== Track listing ==
1. "You Losin' Out" – 3:00
2. "Two Days Short Tomorrow" – 4:57
3. "Nothing to You" – 4:29
4. "Crow Jane" – 8:02
5. "Fail Hard to Regain" – 3:12
6. "The Throes" – 8:03
7. "Drive My Car" – 6:55
8. "My Madonna" – 7:23
9. "The Train That Stole My Man" – 7:49

== Credits ==
- Patrick Boissel – Mastering
- Jeffrey Saltzman – Producer, Engineer
- Dave Schultz – Mastering
- Two Gallants – Arranger, Photography
