= Joe Chiccarelli =

American record producer

Joe Chiccarelli is an American record producer, mixer and engineer, who is a native of Boston, Massachusetts, and has been active since the 1980s. He has worked with artists such as Jason Mraz, The White Stripes, The Strokes, U2, Beck, Elton John, The Killers, Michael Bublé, Alanis Morissette, Young the Giant, Vance Joy, Julieta Venegas, Plain White T's, The Shins, Manchester Orchestra, Morrissey, Spoon, My Morning Jacket, Etta James, Weezer, Michelle Branch, Vanessa Carlton, Cafe Tacuba, All American Rejects, Cage The Elephant, The Offspring, Rufus Wainwright, and Joan Baez.

Chiccarelli’s career was launched by Frank Zappa, who gave him his first major engineering credit on Sheik Yerbouti. (Note: Chiccarelli's surname was misspelled as "Chicarelli" in the credits.) He went on to engineer Zappa’s Joe's Garage Acts I, II & III and Tinseltown Rebellion, before working with the White Stripes on Icky Thump and The Raconteurs on Consolers of the Lonely, the latter winning the 2008 Grammy Award for Best Engineered Album, his eighth of eleven Grammys. To date he is responsible for album sales well over 60 Million and Streams of 22 Billion.

== Career ==
Chiccarelli got his first taste of the studio through a cousin who owned Boston's Fleetwood Studio. He also worked as an engineer at Music Designers Recording Studio in Boston. Chiccarelli moved west where he scored an assistant engineer gig at L.A.'s Cherokee Studios. He got his career break engineering Frank Zappa's album Sheik Yerbouti. In an interview with HitQuarters, Chiccarelli said: "[Zappa's] engineer couldn't make the session and so he decided to take a chance on me. I'm so thankful ever since that day because he gave me a career."

He is credited with discovering singer Tori Amos and signing her first band, Y Kant Tori Read, to a label deal. However, Chiccarelli refuted this in an interview with HitQuarters saying, "That's a myth. Tori was already signed to Atlantic Records as a solo artist when I got involved." In 1998, he mixed the Latin album Un Tributo (a José José), a tribute to José José, the first of many collaborations with Cafe Tacuba.

In 2007, Chiccarelli recorded and mixed The White Stripes' Icky Thump. The band set him the challenge of creating a modern, punchy, heavily edited sound without relying on digital production tools; the album was tracked and mixed on analog tape.

After Producing the Platinum album for The Shins "Wincing The Night Away". In 2009 Chiccarelli produced sessions for Brandi Carlile as well as Minus the Bear's album Omni, released on May 4, 2010. He produced four tracks on The Strokes' fourth album, Angles. He also produced the Multi-Platinum debut album from Australian group Boy & Bear. The band received five ARIA awards for the album. He also Produced the Platinum selling debut album for Young The Giant. It yielded two Platinum singles Cough Syrup and My Body. He also engineered and mixed tracks on Morrissey's Swords album.

In 2011, Chiccarelli produced Jason Mraz's Multi-Platinum fourth album Love Is a Four Letter Word which was Grammy Nominated and yielded the 7X Platinum single "I Won't Give Up", released April 17, 2012 and Alanis Morissette's albumHavoc and Bright Lights as well as the album Songs of Patience for Alberta Cross. In 2012 he produced what became a Gold album, Departures, for Australian artist Bernard Fanning as well as tracks for Dwight Yoakam. His 2013 album projects include Divine Fits, Hellogoodbye, Saints Of Valory, Plain White T's, Need To Breathe, The Madden Brothers, Number One Charting Australian Album "Greeting from California", and Oxbow. In 2014 he has produced Morrissey's album, World Peace is None of Your Business, the first of five album's he's produced for Morrissey. He also produced five songs on Spoon's album They Want My Soul, and tracks with The Rocketboys, Ivan & Alyosha, JEFF the Brotherhood and Victorian Halls. In 2015 he produced a duets album for Doug Seegers and Jill Johnson, becoming a Platinum Number One album in Sweden.

Album releases in 2016 included releases from Oxbow, Buffalo Sunn, Bleached, Cherry Glazerr, Night Riots, SPEAK and Broken Social Scene. Album productions in 2017 included Flogging Molly, Jamie Lawson, The Wonders Years, Vance Joy and Morrissey. Album sessions in 2018 included debut album for Rare Americans, new albums for Broken Social Scene, Charly Bliss, Half Moon Run, Morrissey, The Shelters and Run River North. 2019 sessions included Morrissey, The Falls, The Jacks, Rare Americans, Little Dragon, Taylor Janzen and the Juno Award winning album for Half Moon Run's A Blemish In The Great Light. 2020 Sessions include Didirri, The Dumes, Duncan Laurence, Jagwar Twin, Liily, and Classless Act. 2021 sessions include new albums for The Districts, Michael Bublé and Cayucas. 2022 sessions include Middle Class Rut, Oxbow, Orianthi, Tegan & Sara, The Blue Stones, Robert Randolph and Liz Brasher. 2023 productions with Morrissey, Oxbow, Michael Bublé, Keith Urban, Illiterate Light, Falls, Art D'ecco, Robert Randolph, Jake Wesley Rogers and The Takes. 2024 sessions include Morrissey, Oxbow, Ripe, Sun Room, Steve Bardwil, The Takes, and Weezer. 2025 sessions include Morrissey, Des Rocs for the album To Hell and Back, DICE and Arde Bogotá. In 2026 Produced "7 Generations" on Robert Randolph's Grammy Winning "Preacher Kids" album. Produced a Number One charting , Gold album ,for Arde Bogota "El Club De La Gente Sola" for Sony Spain. A Number One ARIA Chart album In Australia for band DICE "I Thought the Altitude Would Be Worth The View". A new album for The Steve Bardwil Band. EP For artist Liam St. John. Mixed the upcoming album for Nūs.

== Selected discography ==
2000

- U2 – Best of 1990-2000 (Mix)
- Bon Jovi – Crush (Record)
- Julieta Venegas – Bueninvento (Produce/Record/Mix)
- Counting Crows - This Desert Life (Record)

2001

- Elton John – Songs From the West Coast (Record/Mix)
- Rufus Wainright – Poses (Record/Mix)
- Tim Easton – The Truth About Us (Produce/Mix)

2002

- Bon Jovi – Crush (Record)
- Cafe Tacuba – Cuartro Caminos (Record/Mix)
- The Cult – Paint it on My Heart (Record)

2003

- Rickie Lee Jones- Evening of My Best Day (Mix)
- Hanson – Underneath (Record/Mix)
- Clem Snide – Soft Spot (Produce)

2004

- Pink Martini – Hang On Little Tomato (Produce/Record)
- The Verve Pipe – Underneath (Engineer)
- Chris Botti – A Thousand Kisses Deep (album) (Record)

2006

- Mika – Life in Cartoon Motion (Record/Mix)
- Tom McRae – All Maps Welcome (Produce/Record/Mix)
- Stars – In Our Bedrooms After The War (Mix)

2007

- The Shins – Wincing the Night Away (Produce/Record/Mix)
- The White Stripes – Icky Thump (Record/Mix)
- Castella – How Did We Get Here (Produce/Record/Mix)
- Kurt Elling (Concord) – Nightmoves (Produce/Record)
- Grace Potter and the Nocturnals (Hollywood) – This Is Somewhere (Engineered)

2008

- The Raconteurs – Consolers of the Lonely (Record/Mix)
- Georgia (Atlantic) – (Engineered)
- My Morning Jacket (ATO) – Evil Urges (Produce/Record)
- Augie March (Sony Music Australia) – Watch Me Disappear (Producer)

2009

- Ely Guerra (Homey) – Hombre Invisible (Mix)
- Cory Chisel (RCA) – Death Won't Send A Letter (Produce/Record/Mix)
- Dredg (Universal Germany) – (Mix)
- Camera Can't Lie (Atlantic) – (Record)
- Ponderosa (New West) – Moonlight Revival (Produce/Record)
- Sondre Lerche (Rounder) – Heartbeat Radio (Mix)
- Mika (Universal) – The Boy Who Knew Too Much (Record)
- Manchester Orchestra (Canvasback) – Mean Everything to Nothing (Produce/Mix)

2010

- Adam Stephens (Saddle Creek) – We Live on Cliffs (Produce/Record/Mix)
- Minus the Bear (Dangerbird) – Omni (Produce/Record/Mix)
- Young the Giant (Roadrunner) – Young the Giant (Produce/Record/Mix)
- Juan Campodónico (Universal Latin) – (Record)
- Ilse DeLange (Universal Holland) – Next to Me (Record)
- Rachael Yamagata (Warner) – (Produce/Record/Mix)
- The Killers (Island) – "Boots" (Producer)

2011

- The Strokes (RCA) – Angles (Produce/Record)
- Big Talk (Anti) – Big Talk (Produce/Record/Mix)
- Manchester Orchestra (Columbia) – Simple Math (Produce/Record/Mix)
- Gin Wigmore (Universal) – Gravel & Wine (Record/Mix)
- Christina Perri (Atlantic) – Produce/Record
- Alberta Cross (Ark) – Produce/Record
- Boy & Bear (Universal) – Produce/Mix
- Tiziano Ferro (EMI Italy) – Record
- Jason Mraz (Atlantic) – Love Is A Four Letter Word – Produce/Record
- Dwight Yoakam (Warner) – 3 Pears – Co-produce/Record

2012

- Eleni Mandell (YepRoc) – I Can See the Future (Produce/Record/Mix)
- Keaton Henson (Sony UK) – Produce/Mix
- Cafe Tacuba (Universal) – Co-Produce/Mix
- Dropkick Murphys (Born & Bred) – Mix
- Alanis Morissette (Collective Sounds) – Havoc and Bright Lights – Produce/Mix
- Eleni Mandell (Yep Roc) – Produced/Mix

2013

- HelloGoodbye (OldFriends) – Produce/Mix
- Saints of Valory – "Neon Eyes" (Atlantic) – Engineer/Producer
- Divine Fits – "Ain't That The Way" (Merge) – Engineer/Producer
- Russian Red (Sony) – Produce/Record
- Plain White T's – "Should've Gone to Bed" (Hollywood) – Engineer/Produce
- Bernard Fanning – Departures – Mixing/Producer

2014

- Spoon (Loma Vista/Universal) – Produce/Record
- Real Estate "Talking Backwards" (Domino) – Mix
- NeedToBreathe (Atlantic) – Produce/Record
- Saints Of Valory (Atlantic) – Produce/Record
- Morrissey (Harvest/Capitol) – Produce/Mix
- The Madden Brothers (Capitol) – Produce/Mix

2015

- The Front Bottoms – Back on Top (Atlantic) – Produce/Mix
- Jeff The Brotherhood (Warner Bros.) – Produce/Record
- Ivan & Alyosha (Dualtone) – Produce/Mix
- On An On – And the Wave Has Two Sides(RollCall) – Producer/Engineer/Mixing
- Victorian Halls – Hyperalgesia (Victory) – Mixing

2016

- Doug Seegers (Universal) – Produce/Mix
- Bleached (Secretly Canadian) – Produce/Record
- Milow (Universal) – Produce/Record
- The Arkells (Universal) – Produce/Record
- The Augustines (Universal) – Produce/Mix

2017

- Morrissey (BMG) – Produce/Mix
- Cherry Glazerr (Secretly Canadian) – Produce/Record
- Jamie Lawson (Warner UK) – Produce/Mix
- Flogging Molly (Concord) – Produce/Mix
- Broken Social Scene (Universal) – Produce/Record
- Wildling (Warner Bros) – Produce/Record
- Oxbow – Thin Black Duke (HydraHead) – Produce/Mix
- Night Riots (Sumerian) – Produce/Mix
- Meresha (Sonic Dolphin) – Produce/Mix

2018

- The Wonder Year (Hopeless) – Produce/Record
- Only Yours (Pirates Blend) – Produce/Record
- Vance Joy (Atlantic)"Thinking of You " – Produce/Record
- Morrissey (BMG) "Back On the Chain Gang" – Produce/Record/Mix
- Ben Hazlewood (MintMusic) "Months & Miles" – Produce/Record
- HelloGoodbye (Old Friends) – Mix

2019

- Broken Social Scene (Arts & Crafts)EP – Produce
- Run River North (Nettwerk) "Hands Up" – Produce/Record
- Morrissey (BMG) "California Son" – Produce/Record/Mix
- Rare Americans (RA) – Produce/Record
- Charly Bliss (Barsuk) "Young Enough" – Produce/Record
- The Shelters (Warner Bros) "Jupiter Sidecar" – Produce/Record

2020

- Morrissey (BMG) "I Am Not a Dog on a Chain" – Produce/Record/Mix
- The Jacks (Universal) "Remember You" – Produce/Record
- Half Moon Run (Glassnote) "A Blemish in The Great Light" – Produce/Record
- Taylor Janzen (Glassnote) "Ruined Plans" – Produce/Record

2021

- The Districts (Fat Possum) "Great American Painting" – Produce/Record/Mix
- Half Moon Run (Glassnote) "Seasons of Change" EP – Produce/Record
- Liily (Flush) – Produce/Record

2022

- Percy Howard (3 Circle) "The Stars and The Well" – Produce/Record/Mix
- Cayucas (One Rpm) "Hanging on the Westside" – Produce/Record/Mix
- Classless Act (Better Noise)- Produce/Record/Mix
- Michael Buble' (Warner Bros.) – Record

2023

- Postdata (Paper Bag) "Run Wild" – Produce/Record/Mix
- The Blue Stones (Monarck) "Pretty Monster" – Produce/Record
- Oxbow (Ipecac) "Love's Holiday" Produce/Record/Mix

2024

- The Takes (AWAL/Sony) "Lay Hold" – Produce/Record
- Jake Wesley Rogers (Warner Bros.) "Loser" – Record
- Liz Brasher (Blue Elan) "Baby Damn" – Produce/Record/Mix
- Sun Room (Sun Room Records) "Faux French" – Produce/Record/Mix
- Ripe (Glassnote) "Friend in the Dark" – Produce/Record/Mix
- Art D'Ecco (Paper Bag) "Serene Demon" – Produce/Record
- Illiterate Light (Thirty Tigers) "The Stars Are Burning Out" – Produce/Record/Mix

2025

- Ripe (Glassnote) "Play The Game" – Produce/Record/Mix
- Robert Randolph (Concord) "7 Generations" – Produce/Record
- Whipping Boy (Blackstone) "Muru Muru" – Mix
- Blue October (Up/Down Records) "Gutter Run" – Mix
- Sun Room (Sun Room Records) "Loose Ends- Produce/Record/Mix
- Des Rocs (Sumarian) "This Land" – Produce/Record/Mix

2026

- Des Rocs (Sumarian) "Hell and Back" – Produce/Record/Mix
- Morrissey (Sire) Make-Up Is a Lie – Produce/Record
- Weezer (Geffen) "Blue Album Sessions" – Mix
- DICE (Virgin Australia)"I Thought The Altitude" – Produce/Record/Mix
- Arde'Bogota (Sony Spain) "El Club De La Genie Sola" – Produce/Mix
- Good Charlotte (MDDN) "Greeting from California - Produce/Record/Mix
- Steve Bardwil Band (Pulse) "Stardust in Disguise" - Produce/Mix

1980s and 1990s

- Poco – Under the Gun – Engineer/Mix/Record
- No Nukes – Engineer/Mix/Record
- Frank Zappa – Tinseltown Rebellion (1981) – Engineer
- Frank Zappa – Shut Up 'n Play Yer Guitar and Shut Up 'n Play Yer Guitar Some More (1981) – Engineer/Mix/Record
- Deep Blue Something – Byzantium – Engineer
- Del Shannon – Drop Down and Get Me – Engineer/Mix
- Robert Williams – Buy My Record EP – Producer
- Poco – Blue and Gray – Engineer
- Red Rider – As Far as Siam – Engineer/Mix/Record
- Red Rider – Neruda – Engineer
- Willie Phoenix – Willie Phoenix – Produce/Engineer
- Oingo Boingo – Nothing to Fear – Producer/Engineer/Recording
- Fast Times at Ridgemont High – Producer
- Ray Manzarek – Carmina Burana – Mixing/Mixing Engineer
- Frank Zappa – Baby Snakes – Mixing
- Glenn Frey – The Allnighter – Mixing
- Carla Olson / The Textones – Midnight Mission – Engineer/Mixing
- Third Eye Blind – Non-Dairy Creamer – Mixing
- Romeo Void – Instincts – Mixing
- Hole – Celebrity Skin – Engineer
- Fishbone – Party at Ground Zero – Engineer
- Poco – Inamorata – Producer/Engineer
- Bangles – All Over the Place – Mixing
- Vision Quest (Original Soundtrack) – Engineer/Mixing/Record
- Pat Benatar – Seven the Hard Way – Producer/Engineer
- Lone Justice – Lone Justice – Engineer/Overdub Engineer/Recording
- Agent Orange – This Is the Voice – Mixing
- The Lover Speaks – The Lover Speaks – Engineer/Mixing/Record
- Stan Ridgway – The Big Heat – Producer/Engineer/Mixing
- Lone Justice – Shelter – Engineer/Mixing/Co-Producer
- Robert Tepper – No Easy Way Out – Producer
- George Thorogood / George Thorogood & the Destroyers – Nadine – Engineer/Mixing/Record
- Bob Geldof – Deep in the Heart of Nowhere – Engineer/Mixing/Recording
- Julie Brown – Trapped in the Body of a White Girl – Producer
- Alison Moyet – Raindancing – Engineer/Recording
- Jellybean – Just Visiting This Planet – Engineer/Recording
- Breakfast Club – Breakfast Club – Engineer
- The Dream Syndicate – 50 in a 25 Zone – Mixing
- Tori Amos – Y Kant Tori Read (1988) – Producer/Engineer
- Tom Cochrane / Tom Cochrane & Red Rider – Victory Day – Mixing
- Joan Baez – Recently – Engineer/Mixing
- Al Stewart – Last Days of the Century – Producer
- Treat Her Right – Tied to the Tracks – Mixing
- Joan Baez – Speaking of Dreams – Mixing
- Stan Ridgway – Mosquitos – Producer
- Oingo Boingo – Best of Oingo Boingo: Skeletons in the Closet – Producer
- Luba – All of Nothing – Producer
- Robert Tepper – Modern Madness – Producer
- George Thorogood / George Thorogood & the Destroyers – Better Than the Rest – Engineer/Mixing/Record
- Hugh Cornwell – Nosferatu – Engineer/Mixing/Record
- Frank Zappa – Sheik Yerbouti – Engineer/Remixing/Overdubing
- Frank Zappa – Joe's Garage – Engineer/Mixing/Record
- Hugh Cornwell – Nosferatu – Engineer
- The Nitty Gritty Dirt Band – Dirt Band – Engineer/Mixing/Record
- Journey – Infinity – Engineer/Record
- Poco – Legend – Engineer/Mixing
- Allen Toussaint – Motion – Assistant/Engineer
- Bee Gees – Saturday Night Fever (original soundtrack) – Engineer
- José José – Un Tributo (a José José) (1998) – Mixing
- Congo Norvell – The Dope, The Lies, The Vaseline (1996) – Producer/Engineer/Mixing
- American Music Club – "Everclear" – Mixing/Additional Production
- American Music Club – "San Francisco" – Producer/Engineer
- Steve Wynn – "Kerosene Man" – Producer/Engineer
- Steve Wynn – "Dazzling Display" – Producer/Engineer

== Grammy Awards ==
- 2003 Best Latin Rock/Alt Album Café Tacuba "Cuatro Caminos"
- 2007 Alternative Album The White Stripes "Icky Thump"
- 2009 Best Engineered Album Non-Classical – The Raconteurs "Consolers of the Lonely"
- 2023 Best Traditional Pop Album – Michael Buble' "Higher"
- 2025 Best Contemporary Blues Album – Robert Randolph "Preacher Kids"

== Latin Grammy Awards ==
- 2000 Best Rock Album Cafe Tacuba "Reves"
- 2001 Best Rock Solo Vocal Album Juanes "Fijate Bien"
- 2003 Best Rock Solo Album Juanes "Un Dia Normal"
- 2003 Album of The Year Juanes "Un Dia Normal"
- 2004 Best Alternative Album Café Tacuba "Cuatro Caminos"
- 2010 Best Alternative Album Ely Guerra "Hombres Invisible"
- 2013 Best Instrumental Album Bajofondo "Presente"

== ARIA Awards ==
- 2013 Best Alternative Album Boy & Bear "Moonfire"
- 2013 Album of the Year Boy & Bear "Moonfire"
- 2013 Producer of the Year Boy & Bear "Moonfire"

== Grammy nominations ==
- Best Alternative Album – The White Stripes "Icky Thump" (Grammy winner)
- Best Alternative Album – The Shins "Wincing The Night Away"
- Best Jazz Vocal Album – Kurt Elling "Nightmoves"
- Best Engineered Album Non-Classical – The Raconteurs "Consolers of the Lonely"
- Best Engineered Album Non-Classical – Lorrie Morgan "My Heart"
- Best Engineered Album Non-Classical – Cafe Tacuba "Reves YoSoy"
- Best Engineered Album Non-Classical – Jason Mraz "Love is a Four Letter Word"
- Best Rock Album – The Raconteurs "Consolers of the Lonely"
- Best Alternative Album – My Morning Jacket's "Evil Urges"
- Producer of The Year" 2007– The Shins, Kurt Elling, Oxbow

== Juno Awards ==
- Best Adult Alternative Album 2020 – Half Moon Run "A Blemish in the Great Light"
