= Brian Littrell discography =

This is the chronological discography of Brian Littrell.

== Albums ==
Year	Album details		Peak positions	Certifications (sales threshold)
Year	US	US Christian	Peak positions	Certifications (sales threshold)
2006	Welcome Home: Released: May 2, 2006; Label: Reunion	74	3	US sales: 100,000
2010	Brian Littrell's Family Christmas: Released: December 6, 2010; Label: Reunion			
2011	Christmas with the Littrells: Released: December 6, 2011; Label: Reunion			

== Singles ==
Year	Single	Chart positions		Album
Year	Single	US Christ	US Christ AC	Album
2005	In Christ Alone	23	21	Welcome Home
2006	Welcome Home (You)	4	2	Welcome Home
2006	Wish	—	—	Welcome Home
2007	Over My Head	20	16	Welcome Home
2007	By His Wounds with Mac Powell, Mark Hall and Steven Curtis Chapman	8	6	Glory Revealed

== Other songs ==
Song	Date of Album Release	Album
I Surrender All	March 6, 2007	WOW Hymns
By His Wounds (featuring Steven Curtis Chapman, Mac Powell and Mark Hall)	March 6, 2007	Glory Revealed
You Alone	March 6, 2007	Glory Revealed
I'll Fly Away Medley (featuring Candi Pearson-Shelton, Mac Powell, Shane Everett, Shane Barnard, Shawn Lewis and Trevor Morgan)	January 8, 2008	Glory Revealed Live - EP
How Great - (featuring Mac Powell, Jonathan Shelton, Shane Everett)	July 14, 2009	Glory Revealed II
Come Kiss Me - (featuring Baylee Littrell)	November 15, 2019	770 Country
