= DNA (Backstreet Boys album) =

2019 studio album by Backstreet Boys

Studio album by Backstreet Boys
- Released: January 23, 2019
- Recorded: 2017–2018
- Genre: Pop
- Length: 39:18
- Labels: K-Bahn; RCA
- Producers: Stuart Crichton; Kuk Harrell; Jamie Hartman; Ryan OG; Lauv; Andy Grammer; Steve James; Ben Bram; Elof Loelv; Jake Troth; The Stereotypes; The Wild; Mitch Allan; Ian Kirkpatrick; Ryan Tedder; Zach Skelton; Steven Solomon; Ross Copperman; Josh Kear

Backstreet Boys chronology
In a World Like This (2013)	DNA (2019)	A Very Backstreet Christmas (2022)

Singles from DNA
- 1. "Don't Go Breaking My Heart" Released: May 17, 2018; 2. "Chances" Released: November 9, 2018; 3. "No Place" Released: January 4, 2019

DNA is the ninth studio album (eighth in the United States) by the Backstreet Boys. The album was first released in Japan on January 23, 2019, and everywhere else on January 25, 2019, through a collaboration with the group's own K-Bahn record label and RCA Records. The album features tracks written by Edei, Lauv, Andy Grammer, Stuart Crichton, Ryan Tedder, and Shawn Mendes. This is the group's second album, after 2007's Unbreakable, without involvement from long-time producers and friends Max Martin and Kristian Lundin. It also serves as the follow-up to their eighth studio album, In a World Like This (2013). The singles "Don't Go Breaking My Heart", "Chances" and "No Place" preceded it. The album was supported by the DNA World Tour, which was the band's most expansive in 18 years. The tour began on May 11, 2019, in Lisbon, Portugal, before visiting North America in July 2019. The album is their first and only on one of Sony Music's subsidiary companies after In a World Like This was released independently through BMG. It debuted at number one on the US Billboard 200, becoming the Backstreet Boys' third number-one album there and the first since Black & Blue in 2000.

== Background and promotion ==
A press release stated that the group "analyzed their DNA profiles to see what crucial element each member represents in the group's DNA." Kevin Richardson said of the album: "We were able to bring all of our influences and styles into one coherent piece of work. These songs are a great representation of who we are as individuals and who we are as a group. It's our DNA. We're really proud of that," yet any group members wrote no song on the album. DNA is also short for "Digital and Analog", which is how the boys started recording in the 1990s.

The group announced the album's name and its release date of November 9, 2018. The same day, they also released the single "Chances" and announced the DNA World Tour in support of the album, which began in May 2019.

== Critical reception ==
Professional ratings
Aggregate scores
Source	Rating
Metacritic	67/100
Review scores
Source	Rating
AllMusic	4/5 stars
Flood Magazine	6/10
The Guardian	3/5 stars
God Is in the TV	2/10
The Independent	2/5 stars
The Irish Times	3/5 stars
Rolling Stone	3.5/5 stars
The Young Folks	7/10

DNA mainly received positive reviews from music critics. At Metacritic, which assigns a normalized rating out of 100 to reviews from mainstream critics, the album has an average score of 67 based on four reviews, indicating "generally favorable reviews".

AllMusic editor Neil Z. Yeung called DNA "elegant and unexpectedly fresh, especially on sparkling electronic tracks such as the Lauv-produced "Nobody Else" and the Chainsmokers-esque "Is It Just Me." [...] Though the tail-end of the album loses some steam, DNA remains pleasant and engaging, [...] taking enough steps forward to continue their pop maturation without ignoring the hooks and harmonies that carried them all this way." Jon Dolan, writing Rolling Stone, found that on DNA, Backstreet Boys "pair their group-vocal magic with contemporary pop written and produced by top-tier technicians," and added: "There's a down-to-earth sense of crisp, hooky economy à la Mendes and Puth, gentlemanly horniness mixed with bittersweet innocence they wear well, even as grown men who know what it's like to soldier their way to hard-earned redemption." Kate Hutchinson from The Guardian described the album as "well-manicured music that cannily plunders contemporary chart sounds and plonks a pitch-perfect harmony on them."

The Young Folks critic Brian Thompson felt that DNA "can feel disjointed at times and not all of its ventures are fruitful, but the album displays Backstreet Boys stripped of all pretence and name recognition, fully leaning into their desire to explore new waters and expand their sound. What’s more, the record definitively proves that they are anything but the nostalgia act audiences expect them to be." Writing for The Independent, Holly Williams found that the production on DNA was "tight, if overdone: twinkling synths, layered echoey effects, and fussy drumpad beats and ticks reflect the fact that we're not in the Nineties anymore. As do the vocals: while there’s plenty of classic syrupy yearning, and some fun funk falsetto (as on "Passionate"), at other moments the boys are auto-tuned into bland 2019 familiarity [...] There are occasional more interesting moments [but] mostly this standard boyband fare, reheated, and topped with modern pop sprinkles. It just feels so unnecessary." Louise Bruton from The Irish Times felt DNA was delivering a polished sound but lacking the band's classic ballads and signature hits. She concluded that the album was a "mature presentation of what Backstreet Boys can do vocally but as one of the biggest boy bands in history, it's just a fraction of what they're capable of doing."

== Commercial performance ==
DNA debuted at number one on the US Billboard 200 with 234,000 album-equivalent units, of which 227,000 were pure album sales. It is the Backstreet Boys' third number-one album and first in 19 years, the last being Black & Blue (2000). It also makes this their eighth consecutive top-ten album following In a World Like This (2013) and set the group's record of generating number-one albums for three consecutive decades (1990–2010).

In Canada, the album debuted at number one with over 46,000 first-week sales. On January 3, 2020, the album was certified platinum with over 80,000 sales. This is also the 5th highest-selling album in Canada in 2019 in terms of physical copies.

In Japan, the album debuted at number one on the Billboard Japan Hot Albums chart selling 26,210 physical copies and 3,644 digital downloads.

== Track listing ==
Standard edition track listing
No.	Title	Writer(s)	Producer(s)	Length
1.	"Don't Go Breaking My Heart"	Stuart Crichton; Jamie Hartman; Stephen Wrabel	Crichton; Hartman	3:36
2.	"Nobody Else"	Ryan Ogren; Nicholas Bailey; Ari Leff; Emily Warren; Gamal "LunchMoney" Lewis	Ryan OG; Steve James; Leff^{[a]}	3:38
3.	"Breathe"	Ogren; Bailey; Brandyn Burnette	Ben Bram	3:06
4.	"New Love"	Elof Loelv; Jake Troth; Erik Hassle	Loelv; Troth^{[a]}; Kuk Harrell^{[b]}	3:00
5.	"Passionate"	Mitch Allan; Andy Grammer; Lindy Robbins; Louis Schoorl	The Stereotypes; The Wiild; Allan^{[b]}	3:43
6.	"Is It Just Me"	Ian Kirkpatrick; Robbins; Alexander "Xplicit" Izquierdo	Kirkpatrick; Crichton^{[b]}	3:37
7.	"Chances"	Zach Skelton; Casey Smith; Fiona Bevan; Ryan Tedder; Shawn Mendes; Geoff Warburton; Scott Harris	Tedder; Skelton; Harrell^{[b]}	2:53
8.	"No Place"	Brett James; Joshua Miller; Troy Verges	Steven Solomon	2:59
9.	"Chateau"	Crichton; Wrabel; Michael Pollack; James Newman; Cole Citrenbaum	Crichton	3:08
10.	"The Way It Was"	Crichton; Garrison Starr; Justin Jesso	Crichton	3:26
11.	"Just Like You Like It"	Ross Copperman; Josh Kear; Dustin Lynch	Copperman; Kear^{[a]}	3:42
12.	"OK"	Crichton; Newman; Joe Kirkland; Jason Allen	Crichton	2:31
Total length:				39:19

Japanese edition bonus tracks
No.	Title	Writer(s)	Producer(s)	Length
13.	"Said I Love You"	Mike Sabath; Dewain Whitmore; Patrick "J. Que" Smith	Sabath	2:50
14.	"Do You Remember"	Alexander Isaak; Mason Levy; Tom Meredith	Levy; Meredith	2:54
15.	"Best Days"	Crichton; Newman; Jesso	Crichton	3:40
Total length:				48:43

=== Notes ===
- ^a signifies an additional producer
- ^b signifies a vocal producer

== Personnel ==
Backstreet Boys

- Nick Carter
- Howie Dorough
- Brian Littrell
- AJ McLean
- Kevin Richardson

Additional personnel

- Mitch Allan – vocal production (track 5)
- Ed Boyer – mixing (track 3)
- Ben Bram – producer, arranger, engineer, and additional vocals (track 3)
- Ross Copperman – producer, engineer, mixing, programming, guitars, and keyboards (track 11)
- Serge Courtois – mixing (track 8)
- Stuart Crichton – producer, beats, and programming (tracks 1, 9, 10, 12); engineer (tracks 1, 9, 10); piano and synthesizers (track 1); vocal producer (track 6)
- Josh Ditty – assistant engineer (track 11)
- Eric J. Dubowsky – mixing (tracks 9, 10, 12)
- Serban Ghenea – mixing (tracks 1, 4, 7)
- Josh Gudwin – mixing (tracks 2, 5, 6)
- John Hanes – mix engineer (tracks 1, 4, 7)
- Kuk Harrell – vocal production (tracks 4, 7)
- Jamie Hartman – producer, engineer, piano, synthesizers, and bass (track 1)
- Erik Hassle – electric piano (track 4)
- Hunter Jackson – mixing assistant (tracks 2, 5, 6)
- Steve James – producer (track 2)
- Josh Kear – additional production (track 11)
- Scott Kelly – assistant engineer (track 7)
- Joe Kirkland – guitar (track 12)
- Ian Kirkpatrick – producer, engineer, instruments, and programming (track 6)
- Dave Kutch – mastering
- Ari Leff – additional production (track 2)
- Elof Loelv – producer, instrumentation, programming, and engineer (track 4)
- Elijah Marrett-Hitch – mixing assistant (tracks 2, 5, 6)
- Ryan Ogren – producer (track 2)
- David Phelan – engineer (track 4)
- Michael Pollack – additional keyboards (track 9)
- Rich Rich – engineer (track 7)
- Zach Skelton – producer, guitar, drums, keyboards, and programming (track 7)
- Casey Smith – backing vocals (track 7)
- Steven Solomon – producer, guitar, bass, and programming (track 8)
- Garrison Starr – guitar (track 10)
- The Stereotypes – producers (track 5)
- Ryan Tedder – producer and additional programming (track 7)
- Simone Torres – vocal engineer (tracks 4, 7)
- Jake Troth – additional production (track 4)
- Tim Watt – mixing assistant (tracks 9, 10, 12)
- The Wiild – producer (track 5)

== Charts ==
=== Weekly charts ===
Weekly chart performance for DNA
Chart (2019)	Peak position
Australian Albums (ARIA)	5
Austrian Albums (Ö3 Austria)	1
Belgian Albums (Ultratop Flanders)	3
Belgian Albums (Ultratop Wallonia)	13
Canadian Albums (Billboard)	1
Czech Albums (ČNS IFPI)	47
Danish Albums (Hitlisten)	31
Dutch Albums (Album Top 100)	4
Finnish Albums (Suomen virallinen lista)	26
French Albums (SNEP)	124
German Albums (Offizielle Top 100)	2
Greek Albums (IFPI)	73
Hungarian Albums (MAHASZ)	8
Irish Albums (IRMA)	25
Italian Albums (FIMI)	14
Japan Hot Albums (Billboard Japan)	1
Japanese Albums (Oricon)	2
Norwegian Albums (VG-lista)	40
Polish Albums (ZPAV)	20
Portuguese Albums (AFP)	2
Scottish Albums (Official Charts)	3
Spanish Albums (PROMUSICAE)	4
Swedish Albums (Sverigetopplistan)	28
Swiss Albums (Schweizer Hitparade)	1
Taiwanese Albums (G-Music)	1
UK Albums (Official Charts)	7
UK Album Downloads (Official Charts)	4
US Billboard 200	1

=== Year-end charts ===
Year-end chart performance for DNA
Chart (2019)	Position
Belgian Albums (Ultratop Flanders)	132
Canadian Albums (Billboard)	43
Japanese Albums (Oricon)	88
Spanish Albums (PROMUSICAE)	89
US Billboard 200	164

== Certifications ==
Certifications for DNA
Region	Certification	Certified units/sales
Canada (Music Canada)	Platinum	80,000^{‡}
^{‡} Sales+streaming figures based on certification alone.

== Release history ==
Release history and formats for DNA
Country	Date	Format(s)	Label	Ref.
Japan	January 23, 2019	CD	Sony	
United States	January 25, 2019	CD	RCA	
United States	February 1, 2019	LP	RCA	
