= DNA World Tour =

2019–23 concert tour by the Backstreet Boys

- Tour by Backstreet Boys
- Promotional poster for the tour
- Associated album: DNA
- Start date: May 11, 2019
- End date: October 23, 2024
- Legs: 12
- No. of shows: 220
- Attendance: 2.36 million (Note: From 182 reported dates.)
- Box office: $193.39 million

Backstreet Boys concert chronology
- Larger Than Life (2017–19); DNA World Tour (2019–24); Backstreet Boys: Into the Millennium (2025–2026)

The DNA World Tour was the tenth concert tour by American vocal group Backstreet Boys in support of their tenth studio album, DNA (2019). The tour performed over 150 shows in the Americas, Africa, Europe, Asia and Australia. It was the ninth highest-grossing tour of 2019, with a total attendance of 999,242 from 95 shows, as well as a total revenue of $92,310,105.

The tour began on May 11, 2019, but was cut short on March 15, 2020, due to the COVID-19 pandemic. They initially rescheduled the remaining dates for 2021, but eventually had to reschedule again for 2022 and 2023. Additional shows took place in the fall of 2024.

== Background ==
The DNA World Tour was announced on November 9, 2018. In April 2019, it was announced that member Brian Littrell's son Baylee would be the supporting act for North American tour dates.

== Opening acts ==
- KnowleDJ (Europe, most dates)
- Baylee Littrell (North America, select dates)
- Delta Goodrem (North America, June 2, 2022 - July 30, 2022)

== Set list ==
The following set list was obtained from the concert held on August 26, 2019, at the Bridgestone Arena in Nashville, Tennessee. It does not represent all concerts for the duration of the tour.

1. "Everyone" / "I Wanna Be With You"
2. "The Call"
3. "Don't Want You Back"
4. "Nobody Else" (Brian Littrell solo)
5. "New Love"
6. "Get Down (You're the One for Me)"
7. "Chateau" (Howie Dorough solo)
8. "Show Me the Meaning of Being Lonely"
9. "Incomplete"
10. "Undone"
11. "More than That"
12. "The Way It Was" (Nick Carter solo)
13. "Chances"
14. "Shape of My Heart"
15. "Drowning"
16. "Passionate" (Kevin Richardson and AJ McLean duet)
17. "Quit Playing Games (with My Heart)"
18. "As Long as You Love Me"
19. "No Place"
20. "Breathe"
21. "Don't Wanna Lose You Now"
22. "I'll Never Break Your Heart"
23. "All I Have to Give"
24. "Everybody (Backstreet's Back)"
25. "We've Got It Goin' On"
26. "It's Gotta Be You"
27. "That's the Way I Like It"
28. "Get Another Boyfriend"
29. "The One"
30. "I Want It That Way"

Encore

31. "Don't Go Breaking My Heart"
32. "Larger than Life"

=== Notes ===
- The Spanish version of "Anywhere for You" was performed in Latin America except in Brazil.

== Reception ==
Just six hours after tickets went on sale in Abu Dhabi, United Arab Emirates, tickets to the concert for Etihad Arena were all sold out. This became the fastest selling event of their world tour and setting the quickest time to sell out an arena show in the UAE capital

== Tour dates ==
List of concerts showing date, city, country, venue, attendance and box revenue
Date	City	Country	Venue	Attendance	Revenue
Leg 1 — Europe
May 11, 2019	Lisbon	Portugal	Altice Arena	18,801 / 19,051	$1,077,876
May 13, 2019	Madrid	Spain	WiZink Center	14,440 / 15,560	$1,451,433
May 15, 2019	Milan	Italy	Mediolanum Forum	10,411 / 10,411	$607,134
May 17, 2019	Barcelona	Spain	Palau Sant Jordi	17,475 / 17,732	$1,436,925
May 19, 2019	Paris	France	AccorHotels Arena	7,899 / 9,000	$708,180
May 21, 2019	Hanover	Germany	TUI Arena	11,197 / 11,219	$943,310
May 22, 2019	Antwerp	Belgium	Sportpaleis	16,972 / 16,972	$1,206,061
May 23, 2019	Amsterdam	Netherlands	Ziggo Dome	16,740 / 16,740	$1,190,308
May 25, 2019	Mannheim	Germany	SAP Arena	11,061 / 11,061	$919,230
May 27, 2019	Munich	Germany	Olympiahalle	12,764 / 12,764	$1,052,015
May 28, 2019	Vienna	Austria	Wiener Stadthalle	13,077 / 13,303	$1,116,458
May 29, 2019	Berlin	Germany	Mercedes-Benz Arena	13,379 / 13,610	$1,171,565
May 31, 2019	Gothenburg	Sweden	Scandinavium	11,557 / 11,557	$914,368
June 1, 2019	Oslo	Norway	Oslo Spektrum	8,781 / 8,781	$663,089
June 2, 2019	Stockholm	Sweden	Ericsson Globe	13,698 / 13,698	$953,136
June 5, 2019	Helsinki	Finland	Hartwall Arena	11,101 / 11,101	$900,068
June 8, 2019	Copenhagen	Denmark	Royal Arena	15,485 / 15,485	$1,333,049
June 10, 2019	Manchester	England	Manchester Arena	13,073 / 13,349	$1,028,880
June 11, 2019	Dublin	Ireland	3Arena	12,419 / 12,419	$974,187
June 14, 2019	Glasgow	Scotland	SSE Hydro	8,557 / 9,223	$764,076
June 15, 2019	Birmingham	England	Arena Birmingham	12,020 / 12,350	$992,664
June 17, 2019	London	England	The O_{2} Arena	28,884 / 28,884	$2,684,306
June 18, 2019	London	England	The O_{2} Arena	28,884 / 28,884	$2,684,306
June 20, 2019	Cologne	Germany	Lanxess Arena	15,747 / 15,747	$1,263,989
June 21, 2019	Zürich	Switzerland	Hallenstadion	13,480 / 13,480	$1,228,038
June 22, 2019	Prague	Czech Republic	O_{2} Arena	13,138 / 15,541	$961,334
June 24, 2019	Warsaw	Poland	Arena COS Torwar	7,228 / 7,500	$618,194
June 25, 2019	Budapest	Hungary	László Papp Budapest Sports Arena	12,872 / 12,922	$865,075
Leg 2 — North America
July 12, 2019	Washington, D.C.	United States	Capital One Arena	13,397 / 13,894	$1,388,801
July 14, 2019 (Note: The concert in Ottawa on July 14, 2019, was part of the Ottawa Bluesfest.)	Ottawa	Canada	LeBreton Flats Park	—N/a	—N/a
July 15, 2019	Montreal	Canada	Bell Centre	15,513 / 16,849	$1,188,160
July 17, 2019	Toronto	Canada	Scotiabank Arena	15,008 / 15,008	$1,431,089
July 20, 2019	Saint Paul	United States	Xcel Energy Center	15,029 / 15,029	$1,469,180
July 22, 2019	Winnipeg	Canada	Bell MTS Place	12,578 / 12,578	$1,058,990
July 24, 2019	Calgary	Canada	Scotiabank Saddledome	12,369 / 12,369	$1,125,627
July 25, 2019	Edmonton	Canada	Rogers Place	14,109 / 14,109	$1,403,761
July 27, 2019	Vancouver	Canada	Rogers Arena	14,169 / 14,169	$1,414,669
July 29, 2019	Everett	United States	Angel of the Winds Arena	7,793 / 8,077	$802,060
July 30, 2019	Portland	United States	Moda Center	13,336 / 13,336	$1,197,171
August 1, 2019	Sacramento	United States	Golden 1 Center	12,448 / 12,448	$1,172,741
August 3, 2019	Los Angeles	United States	Staples Center	13,282 / 14,158	$1,334,557
August 4, 2019	San Jose	United States	SAP Center	13,112 / 13,478	$1,328,286
August 5, 2019	Anaheim	United States	Honda Center	12,537 / 12,945	$1,089,354
August 7, 2019	Salt Lake City	United States	Vivint Smart Home Arena	12,124 / 12,417	$941,101
August 8, 2019	Denver	United States	Pepsi Center	12,489 / 12,978	$1,073,489
August 10, 2019	Chicago	United States	United Center	14,971 / 15,311	$1,425,918
August 12, 2019	Detroit	United States	Little Caesars Arena	15,959 / 15,959	$1,422,120
August 14, 2019	Boston	United States	TD Garden	13,075 / 13,442	$1,265,642
August 15, 2019	Brooklyn	United States	Barclays Center	16,524 / 16,524	$2,204,409
August 17, 2019	Philadelphia	United States	Wells Fargo Center	14,916 / 15,307	$1,098,765
August 20, 2019	Raleigh	United States	PNC Arena	13,422 / 13,422	$1,256,486
August 21, 2019	Atlanta	United States	State Farm Arena	11,612 / 11,612	$1,108,964
August 23, 2019	Sunrise	United States	BB&T Center	13,538 / 13,538	$1,283,152
August 24, 2019	Orlando	United States	Amway Center	13,043 / 13,043	$1,314,467
August 26, 2019	Nashville	United States	Bridgestone Arena	13,628 / 13,628	$1,239,888
August 27, 2019	Memphis	United States	FedExForum	9,690 / 11,842	$600,281
August 28, 2019	Tulsa	United States	BOK Center	9,072 / 9,598	$688,436
August 30, 2019	New Orleans	United States	Smoothie King Center	12,514 / 13,428	$1,193,584
August 31, 2019	Houston	United States	Toyota Center	12,305 / 12,305	$1,449,011
September 1, 2019	Dallas	United States	American Airlines Center	13,634 / 13,634	$1,361,524
September 3, 2019	Lafayette	United States	Cajundome	7,628 / 9,203	$435,112
September 4, 2019	Birmingham	United States	Legacy Arena	10,498 / 11,315	$822,762
September 6, 2019	St. Louis	United States	Enterprise Center	13,496 / 13,496	$1,164,409
September 7, 2019	Kansas City	United States	Sprint Center	13,474 / 13,474	$1,199,927
September 8, 2019	Omaha	United States	CHI Health Center Arena	12,270 / 13,034	$893,790
September 10, 2019	Indianapolis	United States	Bankers Life Fieldhouse	12,269 / 12,269	$955,649
September 11, 2019	Milwaukee	United States	Fiserv Forum	11,601 / 11,601	$1,261,850
September 13, 2019	Louisville	United States	KFC Yum! Center	14,907 / 14,907	$1,224,299
September 14, 2019	Pittsburgh	United States	PPG Paints Arena	13,960 / 13,960	$1,221,912
September 15, 2019	Newark	United States	Prudential Center	13,023 / 13,023	$1,879,908
September 16, 2019 (Note: The concert in Hershey on August 18, 2019, was postponed due to a thunderstorm. The band performed two songs before the show was postponed and rescheduled for September 16, 2019.)	Hershey	United States	Hersheypark Stadium	19,780 / 24,879	$1,254,853
Leg 3 — Asia
October 16, 2019	Osaka	Japan	Osaka-Jo Hall	10,156 / 10,156	$1,690,048
October 19, 2019	Macau		Cotai Arena	11,183 / 11,183	$1,440,701
October 22, 2019	Taipei	Taiwan	Nangang Exhibition Hall	9,450 / 10,556	$1,158,454
October 24, 2019	Bangkok	Thailand	Impact Exhibition Hall 5–6	5,579 / 8,681	$774,438
October 26, 2019	Jakarta	Indonesia	Jakarta International Expo	5,000 / 5,000	$742,950
October 28, 2019	Pasay	Philippines	Mall of Asia Arena	8,578 / 8,578	$1,434,838
October 30, 2019	Singapore		Singapore Indoor Stadium	9,879 / 9,879	$1,705,211
Leg 4 — North America
November 2, 2019	Honolulu	United States	Blaisdell Arena	23,425 / 25,697	$2,770,610
November 3, 2019	Honolulu	United States	Blaisdell Arena	23,425 / 25,697	$2,770,610
November 5, 2019	Honolulu	United States	Blaisdell Arena	23,425 / 25,697	$2,770,610
November 6, 2019	Honolulu	United States	Blaisdell Arena	23,425 / 25,697	$2,770,610
Leg 5 — Latin America
February 20, 2020	Mexico City	Mexico	Palacio de los Deportes	43,370 / 43,370	$3,601,893
February 21, 2020	Mexico City	Mexico	Palacio de los Deportes	43,370 / 43,370	$3,601,893
February 22, 2020	Mexico City	Mexico	Palacio de los Deportes	43,370 / 43,370	$3,601,893
February 24, 2020	Monterrey	Mexico	Arena Monterrey	25,442 / 25,442	$1,397,072
February 25, 2020	Monterrey	Mexico	Arena Monterrey	25,442 / 25,442	$1,397,072
February 26, 2020	Guadalajara	Mexico	Arena VFG	11,814 / 11,814	$753,390
February 28, 2020	Alajuela	Costa Rica	Anfiteatro Coca-Cola	11,152 / 11,152	$986,408
March 1, 2020	Bogotá	Colombia	Movistar Arena	19,990 / 19,990	$1,930,409
March 2, 2020	Bogotá	Colombia	Movistar Arena	19,990 / 19,990	$1,930,409
March 4, 2020	Santiago	Chile	Estadio Bicentenario de La Florida	40,078 / 40,078	$3,085,858
March 5, 2020	Santiago	Chile	Estadio Bicentenario de La Florida	40,078 / 40,078	$3,085,858
March 7, 2020	Buenos Aires	Argentina	Campo Argentino de Polo	25,025 / 25,025	$1,620,100
March 8, 2020	Montevideo	Uruguay	Antel Arena	13,780 / 13,780	$888,018
March 9, 2020	Montevideo	Uruguay	Antel Arena	13,780 / 13,780	$888,018
March 11, 2020	Uberlândia	Brazil	Ginásio Sabiazinho	7,043 / 7,043	$541,487
March 13, 2020	Rio de Janeiro	Brazil	Jeunesse Arena	11,268 / 11,268	$861,213
Leg 6 — North America
April 8, 2022	Las Vegas	United States	The Colosseum at Caesars Palace	12,223 / 27,773	$1,588,757
April 9, 2022	Las Vegas	United States	The Colosseum at Caesars Palace	12,223 / 27,773	$1,588,757
April 15, 2022	Las Vegas	United States	The Colosseum at Caesars Palace	12,223 / 27,773	$1,588,757
April 16, 2022	Las Vegas	United States	The Colosseum at Caesars Palace	12,223 / 27,773	$1,588,757
May 15, 2022 (Note: The May 15, 2022, concert in Mexico City was part of Tecate Emblema 2022 Festival.)	Mexico City	Mexico	Foro Sol	—N/a	—N/a
June 4, 2022	Chula Vista	United States	North Island Credit Union Amphitheatre	16,551 / 19,767	$993,362
June 5, 2022	Irvine	United States	FivePoint Amphitheatre	10,864 / 11,660	$883,187
June 7, 2022	Los Angeles	United States	Hollywood Bowl	17,269 / 17,269	$1,905,463
June 9, 2022	Phoenix	United States	Ak-Chin Pavilion	16,685 / 19,325	$1,079,101
June 11, 2022	Albuquerque	United States	Isleta Amphitheater	13,109 / 15,291	$767,050
June 13, 2022	Austin	United States	Germania Inscurance Amphitheater	9,836 / 12,512	$668,143
June 14, 2022	The Woodlands	United States	Cynthia Woods Mitchell Pavilion	16,346 / 16,346	$1,197,039
June 15, 2022	Irving	United States	Toyota Music Factory	7,825 / 7,879	$818,171
June 17, 2022	Rogers	United States	Walmart Arkansas Music Pavilion	10,795 / 10,825	$795,281
June 20, 2022	Jacksonville	United States	VyStar Veterans Memorial Arena	10,672 / 10,672	$1,133,884
June 21, 2022	Tampa	United States	MidFlorida Credit Union Amphitheatre	18,239 / 18,239	$1,333,131
June 22, 2022	West Palm Beach	United States	iTHINK Financial Amphitheatre	17,716 / 17,716	$1,163,629
June 24, 2022	Charlotte	United States	PNC Music Pavilion	18,353 / 18,353	$1,115,506
June 25, 2022	Raleigh	United States	Coastal Credit Union Music Park	15,150 / 15,150	$794,074
June 28, 2022	Alpharetta	United States	Ameris Bank Amphitheatre	11,736 / 12,065	$837,259
July 1, 2022	Toronto	Canada	Budweiser Stage	31,561 / 31,896	$2,241,040
July 2, 2022	Toronto	Canada	Budweiser Stage	31,561 / 31,896	$2,241,040
July 3, 2022	Darien Center	United States	Darien Lake Performing Arts Center	14,179 / 21,780	$811,435
July 5, 2022	Burgettstown	United States	The Pavilion at Star Lake	13,849 / 23,039	$629,679
July 6, 2022	Cuyahoga Falls	United States	Blossom Music Center	18,351 / 19,726	$1,082,838
July 8, 2022	Milwaukee	United States	American Family Insurance Amphitheater	—	—
July 10, 2022	Noblesville	United States	Ruoff Music Center	21,317 / 23,712	$1,081,313
July 13, 2022	Virginia Beach	United States	Veterans United Home Loans Amphitheater	15,197 / 19,785	$794,098
July 14, 2022	Camden	United States	Freedom Mortgage Pavilion	18,122 / 24,948	$1,108,622
July 16, 2022	Wantagh	United States	Jones Beach Theater	13,619 / 13,619	$1,360,916
July 17, 2022	Hartford	United States	Xfinity Theatre	15,071 / 24,222	$865,983
July 19, 2022	Holmdel Township	United States	PNC Bank Arts Center	17,168 / 17,168	$1,212,986
July 20, 2022	Mansfield	United States	Xfinity Center	15,518 / 19,537	$1,137,466
July 21, 2022	Bangor	United States	Darling's Waterfront Pavilion	9,652 / 10,969	$732,460
July 23, 2022	Saratoga Springs	United States	Saratoga Performing Arts Center	16,656 / 24,998	$857,344
July 24, 2022	Bethel	United States	Bethel Woods Center for the Arts	10,952 / 15,991	$757,391
July 26, 2022	Cincinnati	United States	Riverbend Music Center	13,201 / 20,372	$759,272
July 28, 2022	Clarkston	United States	Pine Knob Music Theatre	14,761 / 14,761	$1,111,933
July 29, 2022	Tinley Park	United States	Hollywood Casino Amphitheatre	25,522 / 25,522	$1,421,553
July 30, 2022	Maryland Heights	United States	Hollywood Casino Amphitheatre	18,978 / 19,066	$1,049,750
August 2, 2022	Greenwood Village	United States	Fiddler's Green Amphitheatre	—	—
August 4, 2022	West Valley City	United States	USANA Amphitheatre	20,273 / 20,544	$1,052,662
August 6, 2022	Wheatland	United States	Toyota Amphitheatre	13,812 / 18,500	$686,861
August 7, 2022	Mountain View	United States	Shoreline Amphitheatre	20,698 / 22,820	$1,004,645
August 9, 2022	Concord	United States	Concord Pavilion	12,397 / 12,715	$704,266
August 12, 2022	Auburn	United States	White River Amphitheatre	15,854 / 16,004	$1,014,662
August 19, 2022	Nampa	United States	Ford Idaho Center	7,714 / 9,465	$563,112
August 21, 2022	Spokane	United States	Spokane Arena	9,749 / 11,020	$763,683
August 22, 2022	Portland	United States	Moda Center	11,133 / 12,715	$1,073,536
August 24, 2022	Vancouver	Canada	Rogers Arena	13,545 / 13,545	$1,140,289
August 26, 2022	Edmonton	Canada	Rogers Place	13,767 / 13,767	$1,098,144
August 27, 2022	Saskatoon	Canada	SaskTel Centre	12,210 / 12,210	$896,438
August 29, 2022	Winnipeg	Canada	Canada Life Centre	11,351 / 11,616	$851,988
September 1, 2022	Ottawa	Canada	Canadian Tire Centre	11,757 / 12,137	$1,166,585
September 2, 2022	Quebec City	Canada	Videotron Centre	12,385 / 13,190	$982,828
September 3, 2022	Montreal	Canada	Bell Centre	14,914 / 14,914	$1,228,612
September 5, 2022 (Note: The concert in Bristow on July 12, 2022, was postponed due to a thunderstorm. The concert was rescheduled for September 5, 2022.)	Bristow	United States	Jiffy Lube Live	18,177 / 22,552	$1,146,754
September 6, 2022	Lexington	United States	Rupp Arena at Central Bank Center	12,582 / 12,582	$1,145,814
September 8, 2022	Nashville	United States	Bridgestone Arena	13,130 / 13,558	$1,247,834
September 9, 2022	Memphis	United States	FedExForum	9,772 / 14,648	$807,247
September 11, 2022	Sioux Falls	United States	Denny Sanford Premier Center	9,874 / 10,785	$1,102,122
September 13, 2022	Wichita	United States	Intrust Bank Arena	9,498 / 11,630	$885,870
September 14, 2022	Oklahoma City	United States	Paycom Center	10,162 / 13,073	$905,389
Leg 7 — Europe
October 3, 2022	Lisbon	Portugal	Altice Arena	18,471 / 18,471	$962,914
October 4, 2022	Madrid	Spain	WiZink Center	15,262 / 15,262	$1,237,579
October 6, 2022	Barcelona	Spain	Palau Sant Jordi	17,833 / 17,833	$1,482,792
October 8, 2022	Paris	France	Accor Arena	13,493 / 14,450	$975,472
October 9, 2022	Amsterdam	Netherlands	Ziggo Dome	16,712 / 16,712	$1,126,594
October 10, 2022	Cologne	Germany	Lanxess Arena	32,632 / 32,632 (Note: The attendance and box revenue is representative of the shows on October 10 and October 31.)	$2,844,819
October 12, 2022	Berlin	Germany	Mercedes-Benz Arena	26,499 / 27,257	$2,448,040
October 13, 2022	Berlin	Germany	Mercedes-Benz Arena	26,499 / 27,257	$2,448,040
October 15, 2022	Hanover	Germany	ZAG-Arena	10,749 / 10,860	$1,008,448
October 17, 2022	Mannheim	Germany	SAP Arena	22,064 / 22,186	$2,004,363
October 18, 2022	Mannheim	Germany	SAP Arena	22,064 / 22,186	$2,004,363
October 20, 2022	Munich	Germany	Olympiahalle	25,383 / 25,383	$2,420,646
October 21, 2022	Munich	Germany	Olympiahalle	25,383 / 25,383	$2,420,646
October 22, 2022	Bologna	Italy	Unipol Arena	12,848 / 12,848	$937,061
October 24, 2022	Hamburg	Germany	Barclays Arena	22,279 / 22,279	$2,097,570
October 25, 2022	Hamburg	Germany	Barclays Arena	22,279 / 22,279	$2,097,570
October 27, 2022	Zürich	Switzerland	Hallenstadion	12,872 / 12,872	$1,382,379
October 29, 2022	Krakow	Poland	Tauron Arena	17,817 / 18,199	$1,219,385
October 30, 2022	Leipzig	Germany	Arena Leipzig	10,273 / 10,273	$905,139
October 31, 2022	Cologne	Germany	Lanxess Arena		
November 2, 2022	Budapest	Hungary	László Papp Budapest Sports Arena	13,146 / 13,346	$784,903
November 4, 2022	Dortmund	Germany	Westfallenhallen	11,105 / 11,187	$1,059,949
November 6, 2022	London	England	The O_{2} Arena	15,840 / 15,840	$1,417,721
November 8, 2022	Manchester	England	AO Arena	12,677 / 13,135	$1,143,598
November 10, 2022	Antwerp	Belgium	Sportpaleis	16,780 / 16,780	$1,331,946
Leg 8 — United States (Note: The following dates were part of iHeartRadio's Jingle Ball Tour 2022.)
December 6, 2022	Detroit	United States	Little Caesers Arena	—	—
December 9, 2022	New York City	United States	Madison Square Garden	—	—
December 11, 2022	Boston	United States	TD Garden	—	—
December 16, 2022	Tampa	United States	Amalie Arena	—	—
December 18, 2022	Sunrise	United States	FLA Live Arena	—	—
Leg 9 — South America
January 25, 2023	Curitiba	Brazil	Pedreira Paulo Leminski	—	—
January 27, 2023	São Paulo	Brazil	Allianz Parque	—	—
January 28, 2023	São Paulo	Brazil	Allianz Parque	—	—
January 29, 2023	Belo Horizonte	Brazil	Esplanada do Mineirão	—	—
February 1, 2023	Viña del Mar	Chile	Estadio Sausalito	—	—
Leg 10 — Asia
February 14, 2023	Tokyo	Japan	Ariake Arena	—	—
February 15, 2023	Tokyo	Japan	Ariake Arena	—	—
February 16, 2023	Tokyo	Japan	Ariake Arena	—	—
February 18, 2023	Kaohsiung	Taiwan	Kaohsiung Arena	—	—
February 20, 2023	Pasay	Philippines	Mall of Asia Arena	—	—
February 22, 2023	Singapore		Singapore Indoor Stadium	—	—
Leg 11 — Oceania
February 25, 2023	Perth	Australia	RAC Arena	—	—
February 28, 2023	Melbourne	Australia	Rod Laver Arena	—	—
March 1, 2023	Melbourne	Australia	Rod Laver Arena	—	—
March 4, 2023	Sydney	Australia	Qudos Bank Arena	—	—
March 5, 2023	Sydney	Australia	Qudos Bank Arena	—	—
March 8, 2023	Brisbane	Australia	Brisbane Entertainment Centre	—	—
March 11, 2023	Auckland	New Zealand	Spark Arena	—	—
Leg 12 — Asia
March 14, 2023	Hong Kong		AsiaWorld Arena	—	—
March 15, 2023	Hong Kong		AsiaWorld Arena	—	—
Leg 13 — Europe
April 28, 2023	Reykjavík	Iceland	Laugardalshöll	—	—
Leg 14 — Africa
May 1, 2023	Cairo	Egypt	Zed East by Ora	—	—
Leg 15 — Asia
May 4, 2023	Mumbai	India	JIO Gardens	—	—
May 5, 2023	New Delhi	India	Airia Mall	—	—
Leg 16 — Middle East
May 7, 2023	Abu Dhabi	United Arab Emirates	Etihad Arena	—	—
May 9, 2023	Sakhir	Bahrain	Al Dana Amphitheatre	—	—
May 11, 2023	Jeddah	Saudi Arabia	F1 Concert Zone	—	—
Leg 17 — South Africa
May 16, 2023	Cape Town	South Africa	Grand Arena at GrandWest Casino	—	—
May 17, 2023	Cape Town	South Africa	Grand Arena at GrandWest Casino	—	—
May 19, 2023	Pretoria	South Africa	SunBet Arena at Time Square	—	—
May 20, 2023	Pretoria	South Africa	SunBet Arena at Time Square	—	—
Leg 18 — Europe & Middle East
September 13, 2024	Hockenheim	Germany	Hockenheim Ring		
October 23, 2024	Abu Dhabi	United Arab Emirates	Etihad Arena		
Total				2,361,102	$193,387,406

=== Cancelled shows ===
Date	City	Country	Reason of cancellation	Venue	Reference
May 13, 2023	Tel Aviv	Israel	2023 Gaza–Israel clashes	Live Park	

== See also ==
- List of Billboard Boxscore number-one concert series of the 2020s
