= Kevin Richardson (musician) =

American singer, member of the Backstreet Boys

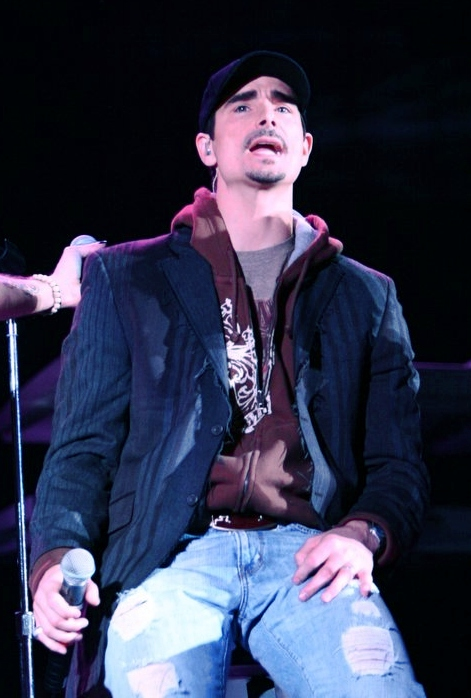
- Richardson in 2005
- Born: Kevin Scott Richardson; October 3, 1971 (age 55); Lexington, Kentucky, U.S.
- Occupations: Singer; actor; model
- Years active: 1993–present
- Relatives: Brian Littrell (cousin); Baylee Littrell (first cousin once removed)
- Musical career
- Genres: Pop; R&B
- Instruments: Vocals; piano; keyboards
- Labels: Jive; K-BAHN
- Member of: Backstreet Boys

Kevin Scott Richardson (born October 3, 1971) is an American pop singer, best known as a member of the vocal group the Backstreet Boys. Richardson was inducted into the Kentucky Music Hall of Fame with his cousin and bandmate Brian Littrell in 2015.

== Early life ==
Kevin Scott Richardson was born on October 3, 1971, in Lexington, Kentucky, the son of Ann Clyde (née Littrell) (June 11, 1943 – January 22, 2022), homemaker, and Jerald Wayne Richardson Sr. (December 27, 1941 – August 26, 1991), an outdoorsman, military veteran, construction worker, fireman, camp manager and handyman.

Growing up, Richardson lived on a 10-acre farm with his parents and two older brothers (Jerald Wayne Jr. and Tim), one of whom is a model, for 9 years, and later lived in a log cabin at Cathedral Domain Camp, an Episcopal church-owned youth camp which his father ran, where he worked as a camp counselor, met his best friend Keith, singer and now bodyguard, and was a regular at the camp talent shows until he was 18. In school he played little league baseball and football, which led him to play football in high school and being captain of his team called the Estill Engineers. Along with the other Backstreet Boys, Richardson took a DNA test which revealed that he is 44.1% English, 36.2% North and West European, and 19.7% Irish, Scottish, and Welsh.

At a young age, Richardson loved music and started learning to play the piano by ear when he was nine. He sang in his church's choir since he was a child and was a part of his community and high school theater. He got his first keyboard when he was a high school freshman. It was just a short time before he was entertaining in restaurants and at weddings in a band called Paradise, which did covers of Bobby Brown and Journey. He also adored performing, participating in the school theater, was a member of the school's drama club, and sang in the chorus. The latter ultimately won out over his two loves, acting and music. He was also a member of the chess club, Spanish club and participated in various school plays such as Bye Bye Birdie and Barefoot in the Park at Estill County High School in Kentucky, where he was voted "Most Popular", "Best Dressed", "Best Dancer", "Best Look" and "Best Looking". He also was in a lot of talent shows, one where he sang a duet with a female classmate and played in a band where he was on the drums and another where he sang a song he wrote with Keith called As Time Goes By. His father Jerald Wayne Richardson died on August 26, 1991, after a two-year battle with cancer, when Kevin was 19.

== Career ==
=== Early career ===
After graduating high school in 1989, Richardson spent the summer working at a Pizza Hut and tobacco farms, while helping out at the cathedral domain and was torn between entering the Air Force to join the Air Force band, or following the lure of performing by attending the New York American Music and Dramatic Academy in Manhattan. With encouragement from his father in 1990, Richardson quit his job, packed up and drove to Orlando, Florida with his best friend Jimmy, where he got a job as a cast member and performer at Walt Disney World. He played various characters, including Aladdin, one of the Teenage Mutant Ninja Turtles, Prince Eric, Tigger, and Sebastian the Crab in the Little Mermaid show. He was also a backstage tour guide at MGM studios. At night, he did dinner theater, playing an Italian gangster in a musical revue performing various songs from the musicals Chicago, Guys and Dolls, and Cabaret.

In June 1991, Richardson got a call from his mother, telling him that his father had taken a turn for the worse with his colon cancer. Richardson's father was diagnosed in October 1990, but his family did not tell Richardson so that he would not worry. After the phone call, Richardson moved back home to Kentucky and stayed with his family. On August 26, 1991, Richardson's father died. Richardson stayed in Kentucky for almost a year, then, after encouragement from his mother, he went back to Florida to follow his dreams of a music career. He continued to work at Disney while also earning a living as a model, writing music, performing in dinner clubs, teaching ballroom dancing as a certified Latin and ballroom dance instructor, and serving as an extra in the film "My Girl." In Florida, he got a job with a friend who had written a musical, he gave him a part and helped him get back on his feet again.

=== Backstreet Boys ===
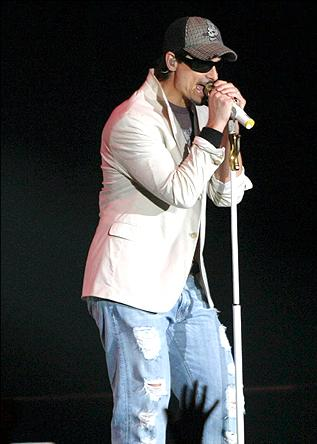
Richardson performing in 2005

In March 1993, Richardson was going to auditions at MGM Studios when a friend told him about "Three guys who sang a capella all the time." Around the same time, he was working at a convention as an atmosphere dancer when he met a woman named Lisa Fischetti, whose husband was Lou Pearlman's right-hand man for 12 years. After seeing an ad about the vocal group, called the Backstreet Boys, he went to check them out, auditioned, and joined the group. However, after joining, the group was still looking for one more member, so Richardson called Brian Littrell, who is Richardson's first cousin (Littrell's father and Richardson's mother are siblings), to ask him to audition. Littrell was immediately accepted, and the next day, he joined the group.

Richardson is the oldest member and is often known as the group's big brother. In November 1999, he was named "People Magazine" 's Sexiest Pop Star, and the band signed a new $60 million deal with Jive Records. Richardson was a part of the group until June 2006, when he announced his departure from the group to pursue other projects and to start a family and "move on with the next chapter of [his] life." He recorded five albums with the group in 13 years. On June 23, 2006, he issued the following statement on the band's official website:

After 13 years of what can only be described as a dream come true, I have decided that it is time to leave the Backstreet Boys. It was a very tough decision for me, but one that was necessary in order to move on with the next chapter of my life. Howie, Brian, A.J., and Nick will always be my little brothers and have my utmost love and support. I would like to thank the Backstreet fans for all the beautiful memories we have shared together and look forward to including you in the next phase of my life. I wish my brothers continued success and look forward to their new album.

On November 23, 2008, for the first time since leaving the group, Richardson rejoined his former bandmates on stage in Hollywood Palladium, Los Angeles, performing the encore, "Shape of My Heart" with the group.

The Backstreet Boys, including Richardson, appeared on the November 4, 2010, episode of The Oprah Winfrey Show. Richardson first appeared in a pre-taped segment in which they surprised a fan who thought she was merely being flown in to participate in a "Backstreet Boys' Biggest Fan" contest. Moments later, Richardson joined the group in the show's studio and performed "I Want It That Way" live with them.

On July 1, 2011, Richardson again joined the Backstreet Boys on stage at the Staples Center, Los Angeles, as part of the NKOTBSB Tour, performing "I Want It That Way" with the group and the mash-up at the end of the show along with NKOTB members.

Being back with my brothers again feels great. I love these guys. We have gone through so much together. We just have a chemistry... a bond that will always be.

— Kevin Richardson, Rolling Stone

On October 25, 2011, an episode of On Air with Ryan Seacrest featured Richardson stating that he would be at a Backstreet Boys beach party in Nassau, Bahamas on December 3, 2011. The party is part of the group's second annual cruise. In addition to being at the party, Richardson performed several songs with the group on the boat in the evening ("Drowning" and "I Still..."). In the announcement, he also stated that he would love to perform with the group again regularly. The group had hinted at a possible return for Richardson during the beach party, but nothing was confirmed.

Several months later, in April 2012, before the group's European tour with New Kids on the Block, Richardson flew to London with Nick and AJ. Fans at the airport asked if he was back with the group and why he was with them. Richardson stated that he was only there to hang out with them. On April 29, 2012, during a live show in London, England, the Backstreet Boys confirmed that Richardson had returned permanently to the group and would be recording a new album with them in July 2012. Richardson also appeared along with the group on Good Morning America on July 17, 2012, announcing his return, their new album, and their first performance as a five-piece group for the first time together since 2006 at the morning show's Summer Concert Series on August 31, 2012. It was also his first TV appearance with the group since he returned. Regarding his return, Richardson gave the following statement about why he had left the group: "I'm a person that always follows my heart and follows my gut, and my heart said now's the time. It just felt right. I feel inspired to make music again with these guys, and you know, when I left, it had nothing at all to do with our relationship. It just had to do with me just needing to be inspired, so I had to step away for a while."

In an interview with On Air with Ryan Seacrest on July 24, 2012, Richardson explained that he returned to the group because he realized how much joy singing and music gave him. He cited his holiday show with Rob Gonzalez called "Home for the Holidays" (December 18, 2011, in Los Angeles), which helped him rediscover his love of music and how much he missed it.

=== Solo career ===
Outside the group, Richardson completed various projects. He composed the soundtrack to the animated film "The Spirit Bear" in 2003, which was scheduled for release in 2010 after several years of delay.

In August 2003, Kevin joined forces with longtime friend Keith McGuffey and opened a Music Academy called The Music Workshop in Louisville, Kentucky. The academy opened to help others learn the 'tricks of the trade' of the music industry – studio technology, songwriting, and contract negotiations.

On December 18, 2011, Richardson headlined a Christmas concert titled "Home for the Holidays" with Rob Gonzalez. The concert was hosted by Montage Beverly Hills luxury hotel, benefiting the Angeles Clinic Foundation of Los Angeles.

In 2012, Richardson began working on his first solo album. During the 2013 Backstreet Boys cruise, when each member held their own events, Richardson performed an event called Cover Story, in which he performed various covers of songs. He had mentioned that he would release an album called "Cover Story." The album would include songs that have influenced him over the years. The album was supposed to be released in 2012 but was delayed as he returned as an active member of the Backstreet Boys the same year. On May 9, 2015, he posted a new track from his "Cover Story" album on YouTube, which he planned to release in 2015. The song was "She's Got a Way," a cover of the Billy Joel song. As of 2022, the album has not been released.

=== Modeling career ===
Richardson has been a model for Versace. He also modeled for Vogue and is a brand ambassador for TAG Heuer.

=== Acting career ===
Along with the rest of the Backstreet Boys, Richardson has made appearances on Arthur, Sesame Street, Sabrina the Teenage Witch, and This Is the End.

During the Backstreet Boys' 2003 hiatus, Richardson began acting. He played the role of smooth-talking lawyer Billy Flynn in the Broadway production of Chicago. He was a part of the show in New York City (January 20 – March 9), Pittsburgh (July 26–27), San Francisco (August 6–24), and the West End of London (September 22 – November 1). In 2003, he made an appearance on Punk'd where he got punk'd by Ashton Kutcher.

Richardson, along with Howie D., appeared in Krystal Harris 's music video "Supergirl!", from The Princess Diaries soundtrack.

After leaving the group, he returned to performing in "Chicago." On November 14, 2006, he returned to New York City with many "Chicago" alumni for the show's 10th-anniversary celebration. From late November to December 3, 2006, Richardson played the role of Billy Flynn in Toronto, and in Japan in February 2007. He returned to Japan with the show from September 2009 through early October, and then to Louisville, Kentucky, from October 29 to November 1, 2009.

Richardson also filmed some movies during his time away from the group. His first film was the 2009 Christian drama Love Takes Wing, based on a book by Janette Oke, in which he played Cyrus.

Richardson filmed some small independent movies in 2010. He starred in Vampire Burt's Serenade, a vampire-themed musical film, also starred opposite Susan Traylor, Daniel Sea, Pleasant Gehman, Garrett Swann and Michael Maize in Steve Balderson's feature film drama The Casserole Club. Richardson had won an Independent Vision Award for Best Actor in the film at Vision Fest in New York City in 2011. and a short film Unwound in 2011. It is an entry for the Producers Guild of America premiere Weekend Shorts Event contest to benefit the Debra Hill Foundation. The short film only took 51 hours from script to final cut.

In 2013, Richardson and the other Backstreet Boys appeared as fictional versions of themselves in the comedy film This Is the End.

In 2015, Richardson filmed an independent short film called "If I Could Tell You" about infertility, which was released in 2016. In it, he also talked about his struggle to have children.

== Charity ==
Just Within Reach (JWR) was formed by Richardson and started in honor of his father, Jerald Wayne Richardson. Richardson wanted to name the foundation after his father, whom he lost to cancer. Richardson formed the JWR Foundation to provide environmental education and promote personal responsibility and accountability concerning the health of the Earth. The foundation was founded in January 2001. He also ran with the Olympic torch for the foundation in Los Angeles, California, on January 15, 2001, and did various events for the foundation. It has been many years since he has done anything with the foundation, and it is reportedly closed.

In 2026, Richardson followed up on a caller to the Dave Ramsay show, who has been in Baby Step Two with $96,000 in debt. The caller asked Dave's advice as to whether she can go to a backstreet boys concert in Vegas, which Dave advised against. Richardson offered "to pick the tab" for the caller and a friend, and the Ramsay Show offered to pick up the travel.

== Personal life ==
Richardson is a first cousin of fellow Backstreet Boys member Brian Littrell.

Richardson has been married to Kristin Kay Willits, a dancer, actress, photographer, and model, since 2000. They met when they both worked together at Disney World in June 1992. Willits was featured in one of the Backstreet Boys' earliest videos, "I'll Never Break Your Heart," and as one of the dancers at the American Music Awards in 1999. They dated privately on and off for 7–8 years, breaking up in 1996 and getting back together in late 1997/early 1998 when he wrote "Back to Your Heart" on the Millennium album, dedicating it to her. He proposed to her over the holidays at the same place where they said "I love you," and their engagement, along with bandmate and cousin Brian Littrell's to Leighanne Wallace, was announced on MTV on February 15, 2000. The couple married on June 17, 2000, at the Cathedral Domain Camp and Conference Center in rural Lee County in eastern Kentucky. Together, they have two sons. They have resided in California since 1999. Kristin was later in the 2015 documentary Pushing Motherhood, where she speaks openly about her and Kevin's struggles with fertility.

== Discography ==
Solo albums

- Cover Story (2012, unreleased)

== Filmography ==
TV series and films
Year	Film	Role	Notes
1991	My Girl	Bumper Car Driver	
1998	Sabrina the Teenage Witch	Himself	Episode: "Battle of the Bands"
2002	Arthur	Himself	Episode: "Arthur, It's Only Rock and Roll" Guest Voice
2002	Fear Factor	Himself	Episode: "Celebrity Fear Factor"
2009	Love Takes Wing	Cyrus	
2010	The Casserole Club	Conrad Bainbridge	Independent Vision Award – Best Actor
2012	Vampire Burt's Serenade	Burt	
2013	This Is the End	Himself	With the Backstreet Boys, performing "Everybody (Backstreet's Back)"
2013	El Hormiguero	Himself	Musical Guest with the Backstreet Boys
2014	I Heart Nick Carter	Himself	
2016	If I Could Tell You	Derek	
