= Chances (Backstreet Boys song) =

2018 single by Backstreet Boys

Single by Backstreet Boys

from the album DNA
- Released: November 9, 2018
- Recorded: 2018
- Studio: Patriot, Los Angeles, U.S.; Westlake, Los Angeles, U.S.
- Genre: Pop
- Length: 2:52
- Label: K-BAHN; RCA
- Songwriters: Ryan Tedder; Shawn Mendes; Zach Skelton; Fiona Bevan; Casey Smith; Geoff Warburton; Scott Harris
- Producers: Tedder; Skelton

Backstreet Boys singles chronology
"Don't Go Breaking My Heart" (2018)	"Chances" (2018)	"No Place" (2019)

Music video
- "Chances" on YouTube

"Chances" is a song by American boy band Backstreet Boys. It was released on November 9, 2018, as the second single from DNA, their ninth studio album (eighth in the United States). The song was written by Shawn Mendes, Fiona Bevan, Casey Smith, Geoff Warburton, Scott Harris, and producers Ryan Tedder and Zach Skelton. "Chances" peaked at number nine on the Billboard Dance Club Songs chart, and number 19 on the Adult Top 40. McLean directed an accompanying music video and René Elizondo Jr. and depicted two dancers performing inside Union Station.

== Background and composition ==
AJ McLean first met Ryan Tedder in 2003, where they worked together on the Backstreet Boys' 2009 studio album This Is Us and the former musician's debut studio album Have It All (2010). After several years, McLean suggested Tedder to send several of his written songs to the Backstreet Boys. One of the songs included "Chances," which the band immediately gravitated towards. It was written by Shawn Mendes, Fiona Bevan, Casey Smith, Geoff Warburton, Scott Harris, and producers Tedder, and Zach Skelton. The song and accompanying music video were simultaneously released on November 9, 2018, which followed the announcement of the DNA World Tour.

"Chances" is a pop song. Fist-pumping synthesizers are consistently used as the Backstreet Boys ponder over the chorus, "What are the chances that we'd end up dancing? Like 2 in a million, like once in a life". In an interview with Billboard in 2018, McLean explained that "Chances" is similar to their previous 2018 single, "Don't Go Breaking My Heart", but acknowledged that it also felt distinct. He described the lyrics as "more of that realistic love story about chance, to find that person in the most precarious of scenarios". However, Backstreet Boys member Brian Littrell stated that "both songs are completely different" in a 2019 interview with Entertainment Weekly.

== Critical reception and commercial performance ==
Mike Wass of Idolator described "Chances" as "another irresistible, vaguely retro pop-anthem" containing perfect vocal harmonies. Neil Z. Yeung of AllMusic praised "Chances" and "Don't Go Breaking My Heart", stating that both songs are "some of Backstreet's finest, familiar in their delivery yet with a finger on the mainstream pulse of 2019". Writing for Rolling Stone, Jon Dolan stated that the song is "plaintively throbbing". Josh Hurst of Flood Magazine referred to "Chances" as "slightly anthemic", but not jarring.

"Chances" peaked at number seven on the US Billboard Bubbling Under Hot 100 on November 24, 2018. The song also reached number nine on the US Dance Club Songs on the chart dated March 9, 2019, as well as number 19 on the Adult Top 40 chart dated January 26, 2019. It peaked on the Canadian Hot 100 at number 55, and was certified gold by Music Canada (MC) for selling over 40,000 equivalent-sales units in Canada. "Chances" charted at number 63 on the Official German Charts, and at number 82 on the Schweizer Hitparade in Switzerland.

== Music video ==
=== Background ===
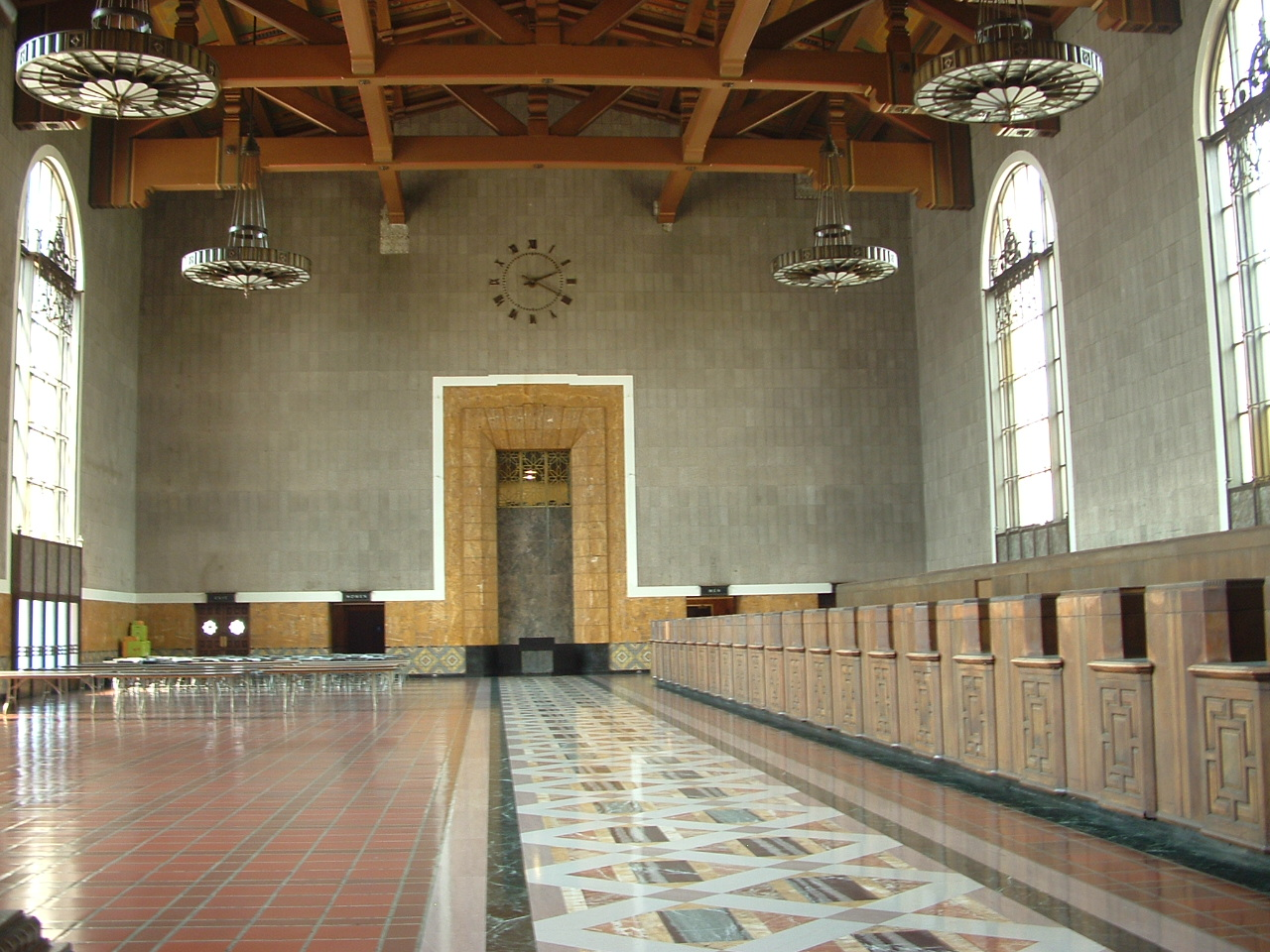
The music video was filmed in Union Station, where the dancers performed an uninterrupted choreographed sequence.

The "Chances" music video was simultaneously distributed with the song's digital release on November 9, 2018. The video was co-directed by McLean and René Elizondo Jr., and was the former's first music video directed for the Backstreet Boys. It was filmed inside Union Station in Los Angeles during public hours, and was the first music video where all five members wore suits. Elizondo wanted it to be cinematic and showcase elements of film noir.

The music video was filmed from 2:00 pm to 4:00 am on September 4, 2018. The dancers featured in the video are Madison Vomastek and Jake Tribus, both students from the Glorya Kaufman School of Dance at the University of Southern California. Their scenes were shot from 3:00 pm to 5:00 pm, and the Backstreet Boys were designated inside the train carriage at 3:00 am. Both Vomastek and Tribus performed an uninterrupted choreographed sequence that was positively received by the band, their label, and management.

=== Synopsis ===
The video begins with Madison Vomastek running down the steps of a train station. She helps another lady pick up a dropped bag, and Jake Tribus, who drops his phone in front of her, misses the train. The pair continue to cross paths throughout the video and eventually, during the second verse, find themselves sitting across each other in the waiting hall. The duo dances in the ticket lobby, concluding with a kiss and facing away from each other on the station seats. The Backstreet Boys appear throughout the video during each sequence, as they are seen behind a pole, inside the moving train, and seated on the station seats adjacent to them.

== Live performances ==
The Backstreet Boys performed "Chances" on the 15th season of The Voice on November 13, 2018. They also appeared on The Tonight Show Starring Jimmy Fallon in chicken costumes on January 24, 2019 while they performed "Everybody (Backstreet's Back)" on the Manhattan streets and Rockefeller sidewalks, before performing "Chances" in matching black and gray outfits. The song was also included on the setlist of the DNA World Tour, which supported their studio album DNA.

== Track listings ==
Digital download – Remixes

No.	Title	Length
1.	"Chances" (Mark Ralph Remix)	3:31
2.	"Chances" (Hellberg Remix)	3:27
3.	"Chances" (Kat Krazy Remix)	2:43
4.	"Chances" (Marc Stout & Scott Svejda Remix)	3:15
5.	"Chances" (Dinaire+Bissen Remix)	3:13

Digital download – Mark Ralph Remix

No.	Title	Length
1.	"Chances" (Mark Ralph Remix)	2:52

== Credits and personnel ==
Credits adapted from the liner notes of DNA.

- Backstreet Boys – vocals
- Ryan Tedder – producer, songwriting, programming
- Zach Skelton – producer, songwriting, drums, guitar, keyboard, programming
- Shawn Mendes – songwriting
- Fiona Bevan – songwriting
- Casey Smith – songwriting, background vocals
- Geoff Warburton – songwriting
- Scott Harris – songwriting
- Serban Ghenea – mixing
- John Hanes – mix engineer
- Scott Kelly – assistant engineer
- Rich Rich – engineer
- Simone Torres – engineer
- Kuk Harrell – vocal producer

== Charts ==
Chart performance for "Chances"
Chart (2018–19)	Peak position
Australia Digital Tracks (ARIA)	20
Canada Hot 100 (Billboard)	55
Finland Airplay (Radiosoittolista)	7
Germany (GfK)	63
Hungary (Editors' Choice Top 40)	36
Japan (Japan Hot 100)	70
Scotland (OCC)	45
Switzerland (Schweizer Hitparade)	82
UK Singles Sales (OCC)	44
UK Singles Downloads (OCC)	43
US Bubbling Under Hot 100 (Billboard)	7
US Digital Song Sales (Billboard)	9
US Adult Contemporary (Billboard)	27
US Adult Pop Airplay (Billboard)	19
US Dance Club Songs (Billboard)	9

== Certifications ==
Certifications and sales for "Chances"
Region	Certification	Certified units/sales
Canada (Music Canada)	Gold	40,000^{‡}
^{‡} Sales+streaming figures based on certification alone.

== Release history ==
Release dates and formats for "Chances"
Region	Date	Format(s)	Version	Label(s)	Ref.
Various	November 9, 2018	Digital download; streaming	Original	RCA; SME	
Australia	November 9, 2018	Contemporary hit radio	Original	RCA; SME	
Various	December 21, 2018	Digital download; streaming	Mark Ralph Remix	RCA; SME	
United States	January 8, 2019	Contemporary hit radio	Original	RCA	
Various	January 14, 2019	Digital download; streaming	Remixes	RCA; SME	
