= Me and My Piano =

Me & My Piano is a 2001 album by Krystal.

Me and My Piano may also refer to:

- Me and My Piano, series of piano teaching materials by Fanny Waterman and Marion Harewood
- Me and My piano, album by Einar Iversen 1967

== See also ==
- My Piano and I, BBC radio series by Clive Lythgoe
- Just Me and My Piano, album by Floyd Cramer 1989
