= Itty Bitty Titty Committee =

2007 film directed by Jamie Babbit

- Theatrical release poster
- Directed by: Jamie Babbit
- Written by: Tina Mabry; Abigail Shafran
- Produced by: Emily Lightfoot aka CEO
- Starring: Melonie Diaz; Nicole Vicius; Daniel Sea; Guinevere Turner; Carly Pope; Melanie Mayron
- Cinematography: Christine A. Maier
- Edited by: Jane Pia Abramowitz
- Music by: Radio Sloan
- Distributed by: Pocket Releasing
- Release dates: February 9, 2007 (Berlinale); September 28, 2007 (United States)
- Running time: 87 minutes
- Country: United States
- Language: English
- Box office: $33,723

Itty Bitty Titty Committee is a 2007 American comedy film directed by Jamie Babbit. It follows the political awakening of Anna, a young, mild-mannered lesbian woman who joins a radical feminist group. The film is produced by non-profit organization POWER UP.

Itty Bitty Titty Committee had its world premiere at the film festival Berlinale on February 9, 2007, where it was nominated for a Teddy Award for Best Feature. It had its American premiere at South by Southwest (SXSW) in March 2007, where it won the Jury Prize for Best Feature. The film was theatrically released on September 28, 2007.

== Plot ==
Anna has been rejected by her college, her girlfriend broke up with her, and her older sister is getting married. She meets Sadie, who invites her to join Clits In Action, or C(i)A, a radical Third-wave feminist group. Anna soon gets in touch with her political side. She takes part in illegal activism with the group and becomes more aggressive in her daily life.

Anna starts falling for Sadie, who has been involved for years with an older woman named Courtney. Courtney works with a more mainstream feminist organization and disagrees with the C(i)A's method of creating awareness through public art, which usually involves vandalism.

The group travels to take part in a gay marriage protest – instead of being for or against it, they argue that marriage is the wrong goal, as it is an institution rooted in sexism. Despite being warned by another member of the C(i)A, Meat, that Sadie uses people, Anna shares a night of passion with her while they stay in a hotel. At the rally the next day, the outspoken Shulamith ends up nearly coming to blows with a protester. The fight is caught by a local news crew and the group's message is misconstrued as violent and homophobic. Meat also reveals that their website – which they considered the center of their activism – has not received hits from anyone besides themselves.

C(i)A attempts to have a meeting at Courtney's home, but personal conflicts come to a head. Anna believes Sadie is going to leave Courtney to be with her, but Sadie remains dependent on her partner. Meat and Shulamith announce that they're giving up on the group, Sadie stays behind with Courtney, and Aggie (a transgender man who's part of the C(i)A) comforts Anna, who is heartbroken over Sadie's rejection and the loss of the C(i)A. They end up partying together and having a one-night stand. In the morning, Aggie has prepared breakfast and procured a flower for Anna, who only considers him a friend. Sadie arrives to talk about what happened the night before. Anna tries to explain that her night with Aggie meant nothing. He overhears and is deeply hurt. Sadie leaves and Anna finds herself truly alone.

In an attempt to fix things, Anna formulates a master plan to get C(i)A national attention. Meat and Shulamith like her idea, but insist she must make things right with Aggie. Anna apologizes, Aggie forgives her, and the four carry out the plan, without Sadie.

Anna attends her sister's wedding, bringing joy to her family, but leaves early to execute her part of the plan – sneaking into the studio of a popular talk show with Aggie and Meat. Courtney is appearing on the show to argue about the appropriateness of a celebration over the (arbitrary) anniversary of the construction of the Washington Monument, which she feels is a distraction from real issues. When the host requests a live shot of the monument, the C(i)A feeds their footage in. With the expert help of one of Shulamith's lovers, Calvin (who was discharged from the military for being a lesbian under Don't Ask Don't Tell), and Meat's prowess with sculpture, a giant phallus has been erected atop the Washington Monument and is blown off with explosives. Back at the studio, Aggie pulls the fire alarm and the group escapes.

In the getaway car waiting for Anna, she is surprised to see Sadie, who has finally broken it off with Courtney. Sadie apologizes for her behavior, and the two agree to just be friends, but then kiss. Through text in the epilogue, it is revealed that Shulamith and Calvin volunteered to take the fall for the explosion, and received a reduced sentence because no one was hurt. Aggie started hormone therapy, started a new feminist group for men and got a girlfriend. Meat's sculpture appearing on TV launched her art career. Courtney took the talk show host, Marcy, out to dinner after fleeing the building together. Marcy subsequently left her husband to move in with Courtney. Anna and Sadie remain together, and Anna now attends college, where she has created a group focused on positive body image called the Itty Bitty Titty Committee.

== Cast ==
- Melonie Diaz as Anna, an 18-year-old Latina office girl for a plastic surgeon's office who becomes a member of the Clits In Action.
- Nicole Vicius as Sadie, leader of the Clits In Action group, dating Courtney
- Carly Pope as Shulie, member of the Clits In Action
- Lauren Mollica as Aggie, a trans man
- Melanie Mayron as Courtney, Sadie's older girlfriend who funds the Clits In Action.
- Daniel Sea as Calvin, a butch dyke former military servicewoman
- Mircea Monroe as Justine
- Deak Evgenikos as Meat
- Guinevere Turner as Marcy Maloney, a television reporter
- Jenny Shimizu as Laurel
- Leslie Grossman as Maude
- Jimmi Simpson as Chris
- Joel Michaely as Peter, a member of a feminist action group
- M. C. Brennan as a member of Women For Change
- Collette Divine as Holly
- Bruce Cronander as Edward
- Camila Grey as Band Member
- Melanie Lynskey as plastic surgery lady (uncredited)
- Clea DuVall as singer (uncredited)
- David Barr Kirtley as protester (uncredited)

== Production ==
Itty Bitty Titty Committee was the first feature film to be produced by the Professional Organization of Women in Entertainment Reaching Up (POWER UP), a non-profit and production company dedicated to promoting the representation of gay women in entertainment.

The character of Anna was originally intended to be a Jewish girl named Hannah, but this was changed after Melonie Diaz was cast in the role. Shulie, the character played by Carly Pope, is both named for and based on Canadian activist Shulamith Firestone. Director Jamie Babbit's original choice for the role of trans man Aggie was JD Samson of Le Tigre. Melanie Mayron originally read for the part of Anna's mother, but was given a bigger role on the strength of her audition. Of her character Maude, Leslie Grossman said, "[Anna] works in a plastic surgery office and I, of course, play the woman who runs the office who has enormously fake boobs. I'm sort of the example of everything evil that she doesn't want to be...telling her you have to look a certain way to be accepted and be beautiful."

The protest activities carried on by the C(i)A are based on real-life feminist group the Guerrilla Girls. Jamie Babbit received permission from the Guerrilla Girls to use their slogans in the film. The film was shot on Super 8 and Super 16 film to give it a grainy, guerrilla filmmaking-style look.

== Reception ==
In a positive review, LA Weekly said the film is "smarter, funnier and more accomplished than its predecessor [But I'm a Cheerleader]" and stated, "Babbit’s biggest accomplishment is in showing how the line between awakened political consciousness and grating self-absorption can so easily be blurred."

Karman Kregloe of AfterEllen praised the casting and wrote, "It's a pleasure to watch Anna's transition from average 18-year-old kid to the CIA's spunky new brainchild." Kregloe added, "It's wonderful to see a film about radical feminism that isn't afraid to poke fun at its characters...The overall tone is quite affectionate, and it feels almost memoir-like in its earnestness and honesty."

Criticisms of the film centered on its character development and script, which Box Office said trades in "platitudes and clichés." Some critics also felt the treatment of radical feminism could have been pushed into more daring political territory. However, the portrayal of Anna's family as accepting of her homosexuality was considered refreshing.

In a three-star review, critic Rich Cline wrote, "The themes roaring around inside this film are intriguing and important, and they keep us gripped even when the plot and characters drift. Western culture's deeply ingrained masculinity is highlighted cleverly in the script, with telling dialog and vivid, lively characters. So it's a shame that they're rather stereotypical--there's one of each type, but at least they're played with warmth and humour."

TV Guide opined, "Babbit's film is clearly designed to raise the consciousnesses of restless, stylish young women who feel no connection to either traditional feminism or mainstream lesbian lifestyles. But the film's sense of humor is juvenile and C(i)A's satirical jabs at ingrained cultural misogyny are embarrassingly obvious...it's hard to imagine that anyone who isn't already onboard with its sentiments are going to hear the call. On the plus side, Diaz and Vicius are charismatic leads, and the riot-grrl-heavy soundtrack is hard to resist."

The film has an aggregate rating of 38% on Rotten Tomatoes, based on eight reviews, with an average rating of 5/10.

== Accolades ==
At the 2007 Berlin International Film Festival (Berlinale), Itty Bitty Titty Committee received a nomination for a Teddy Award, Berlin's official LGBT award. Premiering at the SWSW Film Festival in Austin, the film won the Jury Prize for Best Feature. It also won the Audience Choice Award for Best Feature at the Melbourne Queer Film Festival.

== See also ==
- List of LGBT films directed by women
