= Olive Juice =

2001 film by Ken Hastings

- Directed by: Ken Hastings
- Written by: Ken Hastings
- Produced by: Nicholas D. Karvounis
- Starring: Leighanne Littrell; James Berlau; Michael Hartson; Ginger King; Brian Littrell; AJ McLean
- Release date: February 6, 2001
- Country: United States
- Language: English

Olive Juice is a romantic comedy shot on location in Mount Dora, Kissimmee and Orlando, Florida. It was the feature film directorial debut for Ken Hastings. It was one of the more significant independent films produced in the Florida film industry.

== Plot ==
Leighanne Littrell stars as the spunky Michelle Malloy who feels life is perfect. But she is soon caught unprepared when she learns that her mother has grown ill. The young lady promptly returns to Orlando to visit her sick mother. While she is visiting, Michelle soon learns that her fiancé is not the perfect man that she believed he was. Not only does he have a sordid past but he is also involved in some rather unethical activity. She soon grows depressed as future plans for her living happily ever after now appear doomed.

She soon finds solace with a local pet shop owner who steals her heart with his natural charm and his lovable inventory. Many comedic pratfalls ensue as she tries to fight her true feelings simply because her recent split with her fiancé went so badly.

== Technical Specs ==
- Language: English
- Sound: Dolby Digital 5.1
- Aspect ratio: 1.85:1
- Running time: 88 minutes
- Rating: PG-13 (contains adult language and sexual content)

== Cast ==
- Leighanne Littrell as Michelle Malloy
- James Berlau as Keeler Davis
- Michael Hartson as Matt
- Ginger King as Helen Malloy
- Jay Love as DJ Dan
- Bette Berlau as Jodi
- Elizabeth Auten as Shawna
- Jim R. Coleman as Trace
- Lisa Sleeper as Cat Lover
- Ken Rush as Ronnie Dupree
- Abby Boquiren as Girl Pushing Wheelchair
- James Martin Kelly as Chef Nico
- Brian Littrell as Horse-Drawn Carriage Driver
- A.J. McLean as DJ Naughty
- Allan Medina as Club Patron
- Eli Waligora as Bar Patron
- Cornelia White as 'A**hole' Woman

== Crew ==
- Production company - Doubble Troubble Entertainment, From Within Productions, Inc.
- Written and directed by Ken Hastings
- Produced by Nicholas D. Karvounis
- Associated Produced by Mark Anthony Galluzzo and Leighanne Littrell
- Original music by Brett Laurence, Jason Libs and Michael Tschanz
- Cinematography by Alex D. Karvounis
- Film editing by Alex D. Karvounis and Nicholas D. Karvounis
- Production design by Neil Norman
- Art direction by Ben Daseler
- Costume design by Cynthia Nordstrom
- Production management - Larry A. Lee
- Art department - Kimberly Burke
