= James Martin Kelly =

American actor

- Born: September 6, 1954 (age 71); Brooklyn, New York, U.S.

James Martin Kelly (born September 6, 1954) is an American character actor and writer known for his roles in Mob City and Magic Mike.

Kelly was born in Brooklyn, New York and before acting worked at the post office. He studied the Eric Morris process of acting, and soon left his job at the Post Office to work full-time as an actor and moved to Los Angeles.

== Filmography ==
Year	Title	Role	Notes
1998	Palmetto	Homicide Detective	Uncredited
2000	Animal Factory	Sgt. Armstrong	
2001	Olive Juice	Chef Nico	
2002	Big Trouble	Geo Salesman	
2002	Bending All the Rules	Big Shelly K	
2002	The Cross	Vince	
2007	Ocean's Thirteen	Craps Pit Boss	Uncredited
2008	W.	NSC Official	
2009	The Hangover	Police Clerk	
2009	All About Steve	Mine Safety Expert	
2010	Changing Hands	Petey	
2011	Jackie Goldberg Private Dick	Police Captain	
2012	Men in Black 3	1969 NYPD Cop #1	
2012	Rock of Ages	Doug Flintlock	
2012	Magic Mike	Sal	
2012	Jack Reacher	Rob Farrior	
2013	Gone Missing	Officer Benton	
2016	Ride Along 2	Port Commissioner Griffin	
2016	Neron	Dr. Jones	
2016	Rules Don't Apply	Mobster	
2020	The War with Grandpa	Carl	
