= Daniel Sea =

American filmmaker, actor, and musician

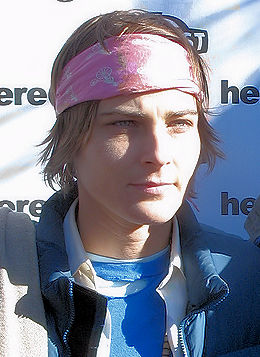
- Sea in 2006
- Born: July 26, 1973 (age 53); Malibu, California, United States
- Occupations: Musician, actor, performance artist, juggler
- Years active: 1990s–present
- Musical career
- Also known as: Dan-yella Dyslexia; Little Prince
- Instruments: Guitar, bass guitar, accordion, penny whistle
- Formerly of: The Gr'ups, Cypher in the Snow, The Thorns of Life, Bitch and the Exciting Conclusion

Daniel Sea (born July 26, 1973) is an American filmmaker, actor and musician. They (Note: Sea uses he/him and they/them pronouns. This article uses they/them for consistency.) rose to prominence through their role as Max Sweeney on The L Word (2006–2009), the first recurring transmasculine role on television. In 2022, they reprised the role for the sequel series The L Word: Generation Q. They have also acted in films such as Shortbus (2006), Itty Bitty Titty Committee (2007) and The Casserole Club (2011).

As a musician, they were a member of The Gr'ups, Cypher in the Snow, and The Thorns of Life, and have worked on projects with Bitch and Will Schwartz.

== Early life ==
Sea was born on July 26, 1973, in Malibu, California. Their parents Melantha Kathleen Tatum-Bobrick and Stuart Wayne Miller were artists and their maternal grandfather Donn Tatum was the CEO of The Walt Disney Company. Sea described their parents as hippies who "left a lot of doors open for me to experiment with my gender expression and life choices". Despite an accepting home environment, Sea still describes having a rough childhood due to the way society viewed being queer and trans in the 1980s and that they were bullied for being a 'tomboy' and 'weird'. Sea grew up playing Dungeons and Dragons, and found refuge in books - especially sci-fi and fantasy - punk and friends who were also outsiders.

Sea came of age as an artist as part of the queer punk, art and activist scenes of the San Francisco Bay area, California in the 1990s. They ran away from Los Angeles when they were 16 to attend Laney College in Oakland in the Bay Area, "like a good gay kid would". While there in Berkeley, they joined the DIY/punk/feminist/artist space Gilman Street Project, studied improv acting at Laney, and by 19 were playing in several East Bay punk rock bands, including The Gr'ups and Cypher in the Snow, touring internationally.

Sea traveled across Europe and Asia. They hitchhiked through Turkey, did some street theatre and performed as a fire juggler with a traveling circus in Poland. As a punk rocker, Sea and their band often performed in drag. At one point in their world travels, they lived in India for eight months as a man.

== Career ==
After Sea returned from Europe, they moved to New York City and decided to re-enter the acting world, giving an audition tape to a friend who worked on The L Word's writing staff. Sea then got a call at their restaurant job in New York and was asked to fly to Los Angeles for an audition. They were then offered the role of Moira Sweeney, an androgynous computer technician who moves from the Midwest with Jenny (Mia Kirshner). Over the course of the season, Sweeney comes out as a trans man, adopting the name Max Sweeney. In 2022, Sea reprised the role in the third season of the sequel series The L Word: Generation Q. When the episode aired, Sea was interviewed by the Los Angeles Times and Indie Wire about their experience performing the role of Max Sweeney, and about their return to the show.

In their music career, with their girlfriend of the time, Bitch, formerly of Bitch and Animal, Sea helped to form a band called Bitch and the Exciting Conclusion. They were part of the band The Thorns of Life with their longtime friends Blake Schwarzenbach (formerly of Jawbreaker and Jets to Brazil) and Aaron Cometbus (of Pinhead Gunpowder and formerly Crimpshrine). The band toured the West Coast and played in New York City and Philadelphia from fall 2008 through winter 2009. Besides The L Word, Sea's filmography also includes the films Shortbus (2006) (with Bitch, both as themselves) and Itty Bitty Titty Committee, released in 2007. They also appeared in the John Cameron Mitchell-directed music video for Bright Eyes' "First Day of My Life" with Bitch. On February 17, 2009, they guest starred on an episode of Law & Order: Special Victims Unit as a transgender man, playing a similar role to Max Sweeney.

Sea was cast in a leading role in the film The Casserole Club, alongside Susan Traylor, Kevin Richardson, Pleasant Gehman, and Garrett Swann. The film is set in 1969 and deals with damaged relationships. Directed by acclaimed filmmaker Steve Balderson, filming took place in Wamego, Kansas during fall of 2010. In 2012, Sea appeared in Barbara Albert's film The Dead and the Living.

Sea played in an unnamed music project with Will Schwartz. They played their second show at the Hammer Museum in Los Angeles, in October 2010.

In their most recent work as a conceptual artist, Sea works through language, music and memoir in a practice that is expansive, crossing several mediums. In 2018, Sea co-created a decolonial theater piece with Marissa Lôbo and Jota Mombaça collaborating with Brazilian artists Ani Gonzala, Juliana Dos Santos and Indigenous leader Sônia Guajajara. Sea is co-writer, producer and songwriter on La La La Little Shows, a decolonial children's sci-fi series, which includes animation, music performance, narrative storytelling and interviews with artists. This show centers BIPOC and Queer characters and artists.

== Personal life ==
Since 2017, Sea has been living between Vienna and California.

Sea has been vegetarian since they were 15, and a longtime vegan.

=== Sexuality and gender ===
In 2006, Sea revealed that since they were 19, they only had significant relationships with women, leading them to identify politically as "a lesbian, or a dyke, or on the queer spectrum" but that "every few years it changes, how we want to define it." They also reiterated how since they "don't believe that gender is just binary, and [...] never have, they identified more with being bisexual or "open-ended".

In a May 2021 interview with Autostraddle, Sea reflected upon their journey with sexuality and gender. They talk about having been with people of different genders growing up, and that they identify as "something like pansexual". Sea mentions the difficultly having to navigate being non-binary in the media and public eye while playing a trans character, Max Sweeney, in The L Word due to a lack of understanding. Sea later clarified they identify as trans, non-binary, gender expansive, and queer. They have also added the pronouns he/they to their bio on Instagram.

== Filmography ==
=== Film ===
Year	Title	Role	Notes
2006	Shortbus	Little Prince	
2007	Itty Bitty Titty Committee	Calvin	
2009	Don't Look Up	Tami	
2011	The Casserole Club	Jerome Holleran	
2011	L.A.dy Dior	Hair Stylist	Short film
2011	Black Moon	—N/a	Short film
2012	The Pyrex Glitch	Clarice Starling	
2012	The Dead and the Living	Silver	
2025	If You Are Afraid You Put Your Heart into Your Mouth and Smile	Mara's father	

=== Television ===
Year	Title	Role	Notes
2006–2009	The L Word	Max Sweeney	44 episodes; main role
2008	Free Radio	Themself	Episode: ""Lance Gets a Billboard"
2009	Law & Order: Special Victims Unit	Blake	Episode: "Transitions"
2022	The L Word: Generation Q	Max Sweeney	Episode: "Last to Know"
