= The Casserole Club =

- Official film poster
- Directed by: Steve Balderson
- Written by: Frankie Krainz
- Produced by: Steve Balderson; Michelle Beisner; Garrett Swann
- Starring: Daniel Sea; Jane Wiedlin; Kevin Richardson
- Cinematography: Steve Balderson
- Edited by: Stephen Eckelberry
- Music by: Rob Kleiner
- Distributed by: Breaking Glass Pictures
- Release date: June 24, 2011 (Visionfest New York)
- Running time: 95 minutes
- Country: United States
- Language: English

The Casserole Club (also known as Sex, Lies, and Sugar) is a 2011 American drama film, directed by Steve Balderson. The film won five awards at the 2011 New York Visionfest. In this film set against the backdrop of the 1969 moonwalk, a group of suburban housewives hold dinner parties to test out their new casseroles. As boozy flirtation begins to dominate the gatherings - and more than recipes start getting swapped - the story shifts from stylized humor to a drama about irresponsibility, selfishness and damaged people.

== Cast ==
- Susan Traylor as Sugar Bainbridge
- Kevin Richardson as Conrad Bainbridge
- Daniel Sea as Jerome Holleran
- Mark Booker as Leslie Holleran
- Starina Johnson as Kitty Bloom
- Garrett Swann as Sterline Bloom
- Pleasant Gehman as Florene Johnson
- Hunter Bodine as Burt Johnson
- Jennifer Grace as Marybelle Beedum
- Michael Maize as Max Beedum
- Jane Wiedlin as Marjorie Lavon
- Nic Roewert as Ned Lavon
- Kelly Pedone as Patti Parker
- Stuart G. Bennett as Gayle Parker
- Iris Berry as The Broad
- Anthony Pedone as Manson Newscaster

== Awards ==
=== Won ===
2011 New York Visionfest:

- Best Male Actor - Kevin Richardson
- Best Female Actor - Susan Traylor
- Best Directing - Steve Balderson
- Best Production - Steve Balderson
- Best Production Design - Steve Balderson

=== Nominated ===
2011 New York Visionfest:

- Best Cinematography - Steve Balderson
- Original Score - Rob Kleiner
- Best Writing - Frankie Krainz

== Reviews ==
Danielle Riendeau from After Ellen gave a positive review of the film, saying the film "offers a bizarre, compelling, and ultimately fascinating ride through the outwardly pretty yet-horrific lives of 'normal people' and "the soundtrack is as kitschy and catchy as the visuals are bright".

Jonathan Hickman from Daily Film Fix made note that he was not a "fan of the visual scope and digital look of the film", but mentioned it was Steve Balderson's best film to date.

Film Threat's Mark Bell gave the film a four out of five, writing a positive review and calling the acting "wonderful".
