= Welcome Home (You) =

2006 single by Brian Littrell

Single by Brian Littrell

from the album Welcome Home
- Released: March 11, 2006
- Recorded: 2005
- Genre: Pop
- Length: 3:05
- Label: Reunion Records
- Songwriters: Brian Littrell, Dan Muckala

Brian Littrell singles chronology
"In Christ Alone" (2005)	"Welcome Home" (2006)	"Wish" (2006)

Music video
- "Welcome Home (You)" on YouTube

"Welcome Home" also known as "Welcome Home (You)" is a single by Backstreet Boys member Brian Littrell. It was the first single from his first solo album Welcome Home, and it was written by Littrell and Dan Muckala. Littrell wrote his part in Vienna, Austria when he was touring with the Backstreet Boys. This song was also featured in the compilation album WOW Hits 2007.

The single reached #2 on the US Christian AC Charts. It was also #1 for 3 weeks on the US Christian Inspirational charts.

== Music video ==
The music video includes Littrell singing and playing his guitar, and showing glimpses of a father-and-son, from the time when the son as a child went to school, to when the son has grown into a young man going off to the military. In the middle of the song, the father sees on television that his son is MIA (Missing in Action), just when he had received a written letter from that son. At the end, the son comes back has returned home safely with the other soldiers. Littrell's wife Leighanne and son Baylee were seen in the video. The ghosts of some soldiers come back too, and people who lost their daughters/sons can see them before they go into Heaven.

In an alternate ending of the video, Littrell is seen walking off into the distance on a set of train tracks.

The music video was directed by Randy Brewer and produced by Roman White for Revolution Pictures.

== Awards ==
In 2007, the song was nominated to a Dove Award for Short Form Music Video of the Year at the 38th GMA Dove Awards.

Year	Award	Category	Result
2007	Dove Award	Music Video of the Year	Nominated

== Charts ==
=== Weekly charts ===
Chart (2006)	Peak position
US Christian AC (Billboard)	2
US Hot Christian Songs (Billboard)	4

=== Year-end charts ===
Chart (2006)	Peak position
US Christian Songs (Billboard)	12
