= Doubble Troubble =

American juggling duo

- Born: Alex Karvounis; Nick Karvounis; November 27, 1971 (age 54); Baltimore, Maryland
- Other names: "The Rodeo Rejects" "Nick & Alex"
- Known for: Comedy, Juggling
- Website: nickandalex.com

Doubble Troubble is the comedy-juggling team of identical twins Nick and Alex Karvounis. Since the age of 12, Nick and Alex have been performing their two-man comedy show worldwide. In international competition, they have won more than a dozen medals and set the world record for juggling 12 rings between two people in 1995. They are featured in the juggling historical reference book Virtuosos of Juggling. Nick and Alex continue to perform their act in Las Vegas showrooms and variety theaters across the country.

== The Tonight Show with Jay Leno ==
Nick and Alex appeared on the late night talk show The Tonight Show with Jay Leno to perform their unique golf trick in which Nick chips a golf ball into his brother's mouth. "Look at these two geniuses," remarks Jay Leno. "You have a lot more faith in them than I do!"

== Filmography ==
Year	Film	Role	Ref
2001	Olive Juice	Producer and cinematographer	
2002	R.S.V.P.	Associate producers	
2017	Tonight in San Diego	Selves	
