= Glory Revealed II =

Glory Revealed II: The Word of God in Worship

Compilation album by Various artists
- Released: July 14, 2009
- Genre: CCM
- Length: 44:20
- Label: Reunion
- Producer: Mac Powell

Various artists chronology
Glory Revealed (2007)	Glory Revealed II: The Word of God in Worship (2009)

Professional ratings
Review scores
Source	Rating
Jesus Freak Hideout	3/5 stars

Glory Revealed II: The Word of God in Worship released in 2009, is a compilation album by popular CCM musicians. In 2010, it garnered the Dove Award for Special Event Album of the Year at the 41st GMA Dove Awards.

== Track listing ==
1. Mac Powell, Shane Everett, Brian Littrell, and Jonathan Shelton – "How Great"
2. Trevor Morgan and Mark Hall – "Rejoice In The Lord"
3. Jason Crabb, Jonathan Shelton, and Bear Rinehart – "Wake Up, Oh Sleeper"
4. Matt Maher, Amy Grant. Ed Cash and Mac Powell – "Since The World Began"
5. Trevor Morgan and Geoff Moore – "Psalm 23"
6. Natalie Grant and Laura Story – "Praise The Lord"
7. Brandon Heath, Mike Donehey, and Aaron Shust – "What We Proclaim"
8. Mac Powell and Shawn Lewis – "Blessed Hope"
9. Sara Evans and Bethany Dick – "There Is a City"
10. Shane & Shane – "Cup Of Salvation"
11. Shawn Lewis and Bethany Dillon – "Never"
12. Matt Maher and Kari Jobe – "To You Be The Glory"
