= Welcome Home (Brian Littrell album) =

Studio album by Brian Littrell
- Released: May 2, 2006
- Recorded: 2005–2006
- Studios: Glorified Mono Studio, The Bennett House and The Cellar (Franklin, Tennessee); Oxford Sound, Uncle Tom's Cabin and Vertical Sound Studio (Nashville, Tennessee); Tree Sound Studios (Atlanta, Georgia); RMI Studios (Los Angeles, California); Paramount Recording Studios (Hollywood, California)
- Genres: Pop, pop rock, Christian pop
- Length: 49:39
- Labels: Sony BMG; Reunion
- Producers: Mark Kibble; Billy Mann; Dan Muckala; David Thomas

Singles from Welcome Home
- 1. " In Christ Alone" Released: February 02, 2005; 2. "Welcome Home (You)" Released: March 11, 2006; 3. "Wish" Released: October 26, 2006; 4. "Over My Head" Released: 2007

Welcome Home is the debut solo album by Backstreet Boys member Brian Littrell. The album was released on May 2, 2006, on Sony BMG and Christian music label Reunion Records. The album peaked on the Billboard 200 at number 74, and at number 3 on the Christian Albums chart. The single "Welcome Home (You)" charted at number one on the Christian Songs chart. The album had sold over 100,000 copies in US as of April 2007.

== Recording ==
For a long time, Littrell had wanted to record Christian music—what he calls "pop positive" music. His first solo album, Welcome Home, was released on May 2, 2006, which, like the Backstreet Boys projects, is a Sony BMG release. The album peaked at number 74 on the Billboard 200 and number 3 on the Christian charts, and has sold over 100,000 copies. Three singles were released from the album. The first, "Welcome Home (You)", reached number 2 on the US Christian charts and number one on Reach FM's Top 40 chart and the R&R Christian Inspirational Chart, staying there for three weeks. The second single was "Wish" and, in 2007, the third single, "Over My Head", was released. During this time, he maintained his duties as a member of the Backstreet Boys. In the summer of 2005, his solo single, "In Christ Alone", went to number one on the Christian charts on July 4.

Littrell was a winner of the 2006 GMA Dove Award for Inspirational Recorded Song of the Year for "In Christ Alone" (along with songwriters Don Koch and Shawn Craig). In the next few years he would win three more Doves for collaboration projects; in 2008, Special Event Album of the Year for Glory Revealed (various artists) and the Inspirational Recorded Song of the Year for "By His Wounds", from that album; and in 2010, Special Event Album of the Year for Glory Revealed II.

== Critical reception ==
Professional ratings
Review scores
Source	Rating
AllMusic	3/5 stars
MTV Asia	7/10

Stephen Thomas Erlewine of AllMusic said of the album; "If Welcome Home is just judged on its sonic merits, it would be hard to distinguish this album from many other slick, sweet contemporary Christian releases, but it stands out from the pack for one simple reason: it's the solo debut album from Brian Littrell, one of the five members of the Backstreet Boys."

== Track listing ==
No.	Title	Writer(s)	Producer(s)	Length
1.	"My Answer Is You"	Brian Littrell; Guy Zabka; Sue Smith; Tony Wood	Dan Muckala	3:32
2.	"Wish"	Jason McArthur; Joy Williams; Rob Graves	Billy Mann	3:56
3.	"Welcome Home (You)"	Littrell; Muckala	Muckala	3:05
4.	"You Keep Givin' Me"	Brett Laurence	David Thomas; Mark Kibble	5:36
5.	"Gone Without Goodbye"	Mann	Mann	4:07
6.	"I'm Alive"	Barry Weeks; Ian Eskelin; Tony Wood	Muckala	3:19
7.	"Over My Head"	Littrell; Brian White; Don Poythress; Michael Puryear	Muckala	4:03
8.	"We Lift You Up"	Littrell	Thomas; Kibble	3:24
9.	"Grace of My Life"	Littrell; Mark Harris; Wood	Muckala	3:34
10.	"Angels and Heroes"	Rasmus Bähncke; Mann; Michael Severson; René Tromberg	Mann	3:44
11.	"Jesus Loves You"	Littrell; Thomas; Kibble	Thomas; Kibble	2:31

Japanese edition bonus track
No.	Title	Writer(s)	Producer(s)	Length
12.	" In Christ Alone"	Don Koch; Shawn Craig	Muckala	3:41

== Personnel ==
Adapted credits from the liner notes of Welcome Home.

- Brian Littrell – vocals, backing vocals (1), vocal arrangements (11)
- Billy Mann – keyboards (2, 10), guitars (2, 5, 10), arrangements (2, 10)
- Chris Rojas – keyboards (2, 10), guitars (2, 10), bass (2, 10), drum programming (2, 10), arrangements (2, 10)
- Dan Muckala – keyboards (3, 9), additional programming (6), percussion (9)
- Roger Ryan – keyboards (4, 8), strings (4, 8), keyboard and string arrangements (4, 8)
- Chuck Butler – guitars (1, 3, 6, 9), bass (3, 6), track programming (6)
- Adam Lester – additional guitars (1)
- Basil Fung – guitars (4, 8)
- Brent Milligan – bass (1)
- Chris Kent – bass (4, 8)
- Dan Needham – drums (1, 3)
- J.J. Hodges – drums (4, 8)
- Jason Gaines – drum programming (4, 8)
- David Angell – strings (1, 9)
- David Davidson – strings (1, 9)
- Carole Rabinowitz – strings (1, 9)
- Kris Wilkinson – strings (1, 9)
- Luke Brown – backing vocals (1)
- Mark Kibble – backing vocals (11), vocal arrangements (11)
- Kevin Stancil – backing vocals (11)
- David Thomas – backing vocals (11), vocal arrangements (11)

Backing vocals (Tracks 4 & 8)

- Elicia Brown, Janice Corder, Lakisha Frierson, Mark Kibble, Kimberly Mont, Tony Osborne-Varnell, Shandra Penix, San Stancil, David Thomas and Keisha Williams

=== Production ===
- Terry Hemmings – executive producer
- Brian Littrell – executive producer, art direction
- Steve Bishir – engineer (1, 3, 6, 7, 9)
- Skye McCaskey – engineer (1, 3, 6, 7, 9)
- Dan Muckala – engineer (1, 3, 6, 7, 9)
- Billy Mann – engineer (2, 5, 10)
- Chris Rojas – engineer (2, 10)
- Mark Kibble – engineer (4, 8, 11)
- Chris Rainwater – engineer (4, 8)
- F. Reid Shippen – mixing (1–3, 6, 7)
- Marcelo Pennell – mixing (4, 8, 11)
- Drew Douthit – mixing (5, 10)
- Jeremy Luzier – mixing (9)
- Kenneth Mount – assistant engineer (1, 3, 6, 7, 9)
- Travis Daniels – assistant engineer (2, 4, 5, 8, 10, 11)
- Lee Bridges – mix assistant (1–3, 6, 7)
- Steve Lotz – mix assistant (1–3, 6, 7)
- Andrew Mendelson – mastering at Georgetown Masters (Nashville, Tennessee)
- Leighanne Littrell – art direction
- Tim Parker – art direction, cover design
- Ron Roark – package design
- Maria Chavez – photography
- Frankie Payne – hair, make-up

== Charts ==
Chart performance for Welcome Home
Chart (2006)	Peak position
Japanese Albums (Oricon)	19
US Billboard 200	74
US Top Christian Albums (Billboard)	3
