= In Christ Alone (Brian Littrell song) =

2005 single by Brian Littrell

Single by Brian Littrell
- Released: February 2, 2005
- Recorded: 2005
- Genre: Contemporary Christian music / Pop
- Length: 3:42
- Label: Reunion
- Songwriters: Shawn Craig, Don Koch

“In Christ Alone” is the debut single by American singer Brian Littrell, a member of the Backstreet Boys. Released as a single in 2005 through Reunion Records, the recording appeared on the Christian music compilation album WOW #1s.

The song was written by Shawn Craig and Don Koch. Littrell's recording is a cover of a song previously recorded by Christian singer Michael English in 1992.

The song was included as a bonus track on the Japanese edition of Littrell's debut solo album, Welcome Home.

== Release ==
In December 2004, Littrell signed a solo recording deal with Reunion Records, a Christian music label within Provident Music Group. The label announced that his first radio single, "In Christ Alone", would be released the following spring and included on the compilation WOW #1s.

Littrell chose "In Christ Alone" as his debut solo single partly because he had sung the song as a child while participating in his church choir. He described his Christian music career as a calling and expressed hope that his music would encourage listeners to stand by their beliefs.

The single marked Littrell's entry into contemporary Christian music while he continued performing with the Backstreet Boys. In May 2006, CBS News described the recording as his first single in the Christian music market and reported that it had won an award at the 2006 Gospel Music Awards.

== Chart performance ==
The single peaked at number 23 on the US Christian Songs chart and number 21 on the US Christian AC chart.

The single reportedly reached No. 1 on the Christian charts on July 4, 2005. Cross Rhythms also reported that Littrell's version reached No. 1 on Christian radio.

== Awards ==
At the 37th GMA Dove Awards in 2006, Littrell won the award for Inspirational Recorded Song for his recording of "In Christ Alone". Pollstar's contemporary report identified the winning recording as the version originally recorded by Michael English. The awards listing also identifies Brian Littrell as the winner in this category.

== Charts ==
Chart (2005)	Peak position
US Christian Songs	23
US Christian AC	21
