= Don't Go Breaking My Heart (Backstreet Boys song) =

Single by Backstreet Boys

from the album DNA
- Released: May 17, 2018
- Genre: EDM-pop
- Length: 3:35 (album version); 3:50 (music video)
- Label: K-BAHN; RCA
- Songwriters: Stuart Crichton; Jamie Hartman; Stephen Wrabel
- Producers: Stuart Crichton; Jamie Hartman

Backstreet Boys singles chronology
"God, Your Mama, and Me" (2017)	"Don't Go Breaking My Heart" (2018)	"Chances" (2018)

Music video
- "Don't Go Breaking My Heart" on YouTube

"Don't Go Breaking My Heart" is a song by American vocal group Backstreet Boys. The song was released on May 17, 2018 as the lead single to their ninth studio album DNA (their eighth in the US). The single peaked at number 63 on the Billboard Hot 100, which is their first song as lead artist on the chart since "Inconsolable" in 2007, and their highest-charted single since "Incomplete" in 2005. The song received a Grammy Nomination for “Best Pop Duo/Group Performance” for the 2019 ceremony, their first nomination since "Shape of My Heart" at the 2002 ceremony.

== Commercial performance ==
"Don't Go Breaking My Heart" debuted on May 17, 2018, and in its first week ranked 22nd in digital sales. The song was deemed by many in the media as a comeback song for the band as it represented their first time charting on the Billboard Hot 100, Mainstream Top 40, and Adult Contemporary charts since "Inconsolable". It was also their highest-charting single on the Adult Top 40 with a peak of number 9, surpassing the number 11 peak of "I Want It That Way" in 1999. In regards to airplay the song reached number 38 on the Radio Songs chart, the band's first time on that chart since "Incomplete".

== Track listing ==
Digital download
No.	Title	Length
1.	"Don't Go Breaking My Heart"	3:35

The Remixes – EP
No.	Title	Length
1.	"Don't Go Breaking My Heart (Dave Audé Remix)"	3:39
2.	"Don't Go Breaking My Heart (Luca Schreiner Remix)"	3:19
3.	"Don't Go Breaking My Heart (Arkadi Remix)"	3:28
4.	"Don't Go Breaking My Heart (Quarterhead Remix)"	3:16

== Charts ==
=== Weekly charts ===
Weekly chart performance for "Don't Go Breaking My Heart"
Chart (2018)	Peak position
Australia (ARIA)	50
Belgium (Ultratip Bubbling Under Wallonia)	23
Canada Hot 100 (Billboard)	65
Canada AC (Billboard)	27
Canada CHR/Top 40 (Billboard)	32
Canada Hot AC (Billboard)	21
Croatia Airplay (HRT)	95
Germany (GfK)	68
Netherlands (Dutch Top 40 Tipparade)	14
Scotland (OCC)	44
Slovakia Airplay (ČNS IFPI)	100
Switzerland (Schweizer Hitparade)	98
Switzerland Airplay (Swiss Hitparade)	96
UK Singles Sales (OCC)	45
UK Singles Downloads (OCC)	44
US Billboard Hot 100	63
US Adult Contemporary (Billboard)	8
US Adult Pop Airplay (Billboard)	9
US Dance Club Songs (Billboard)	17
US Dance/Mix Show Airplay (Billboard)	28
US Pop Airplay (Billboard)	18

=== Year-end charts ===
Year-end chart performance for "Don't Go Breaking My Heart"
Chart (2018)	Position
US Adult Contemporary (Billboard)	19
US Adult Top 40 (Billboard)	28

== Certifications ==
Certifications for "Don't Go Breaking My Heart"
Region	Certification	Certified units/sales
Australia (ARIA)	Gold	35,000^{‡}
Brazil (Pro-Música Brasil)	Gold	20,000^{‡}
Canada (Music Canada)	Gold	40,000^{‡}
^{‡} Sales+streaming figures based on certification alone.

== Release history ==
Release history for "Don't Go Breaking My Heart"
Region	Date	Format	Label	Ref.
United States	May 17, 2018	Hot adult contemporary	RCA	
United States	May 22, 2018	Contemporary hit radio	RCA	
