= Krystal Harris =

American singer-songwriter

- Also known as: Krystal, Miss Krystal
- Born: Krystal Marie Harris; November 7, 1981 (age 44)
- Genres: R&B; pop; soul
- Occupations: Singer-songwriter; pianist
- Instruments: Vocals; piano
- Years active: 1999–2013
- Labels: KBNHA Records; Geffen

Krystal Marie Peterson (née Harris; November 7, 1981) is an American singer-songwriter and pianist known for her 2001 single "Supergirl!" which was featured on the soundtrack for The Princess Diaries and on her debut album Me & My Piano.

== Career ==
On June 5, 2001, Harris released her debut album Me & My Piano. The album featured the single "Supergirl!", which was also included in Disney's The Princess Diaries soundtrack album. The album also features the song "Love Is a Beautiful Thing", which was later used in the film Legally Blonde and appeared on its soundtrack. That year, she toured as the opening act for the Backstreet Boys on The Black & Blue Tour.

In 2002, Harris appeared on Disney's The Country Bears soundtrack with the song "The Kid in You" and made a cameo in the movie itself. She also guest-starred as the lead role in the Touched by an Angel episode 9x16: "A Song for My Father". Harris played an art student in the Paramount TV movie called Save the Last Dance, based on the film of the same name. Set at an art school, Harris described the concept as "the next Fame". The film was meant to serve as a series pilot, but it was not picked up.

In 2003, Harris provided the singing voice for Velma at the end of the direct-to-video movie Scooby-Doo! and the Legend of the Vampire.

She was the lead singer on Victor Wooten's 2012–2013 tour.

In July 2013 she started performing as Krystal Peterson & the Queen City Band. They released an EP on iTunes titled Spell. This was Harris's final release to date.

== Personal life ==
Harris married Daniel Peterson and they settled in Cincinnati, Ohio. Peterson is the drummer for her band.

== Discography ==
=== Albums ===
- Me & My Piano (2001)
- Spell (2013) as Krystal Peterson & The Queen City Band

=== Soundtracks ===
- Princess Diaries soundtrack (2001)
- Legally Blonde soundtrack (2001)
- The Country Bears soundtrack (2002)

=== Singles ===
- "My Religion" (2000)
- "Supergirl!" (2001)
- "Love is a Beautiful Thing" (2001)
- "The Kid in You" (2002)
