= Glory Revealed =

American contemporary Christian compilation album

Glory Revealed: The Word of God In Worship

Compilation album by Various artists
- Released: March 6, 2007
- Genre: Contemporary Christian music
- Label: Reunion
- Producer: Mac Powell

Various artists chronology
Glory Revealed: The Word of God In Worship (2007)	Glory Revealed II (2009)

Professional ratings
Review scores
Source	Rating
The Phantom Tollbooth	(not rated)
Jesus Freak Hideout	3.5/5 stars
Christianity Today	3/5 stars

Glory Revealed: The Word of God In Worship (released in 2007) is a compilation album by popular contemporary Christian musicians. It garnered the Gospel Music Association's Special Event Album of the Year award for 2008.

== Track listing ==
1. Trevor Morgan - "He Will Rejoice"
2. Mac Powell (Third Day), Steven Curtis Chapman, Brian Littrell and Mark Hall (Casting Crowns) - "By His Wounds"
3. Shawn Lewis (Hyper Static Union) - "Waters Gone By"
4. David Crowder and Shane & Shane - "To the Only God"
5. Candi Pearson-Shelton - "Glory Revealed"
6. Josh Bates - "Altar of God"
7. Michael W. Smith with Shane & Shane - "Come, Worship the King"
8. Tim Neufeld (Starfield) - "Who Is Like You"
9. Mac Powell (Third Day) and Candi Pearson-Shelton - "Restore to Me"
10. Brian Littrell - "You Alone"

== Awards ==
In 2008, the album won a Dove Award for Special Event Album of the Year at the 39th GMA Dove Awards. Also, the song "By His Wounds" won the award for Inspirational Recorded Song of the Year.
