= Michael Maize =

American actor (born 1974)

- Born: Michael Meyer; December 1, 1974 (age 51); Milwaukee, Wisconsin, U.S.
- Occupation: Actor
- Years active: 1997–present

Michael Maize (born Michael Meyer; December 1, 1974) is an American film and television actor, perhaps best known for his role of Daniel in the film National Treasure: Book of Secrets (2007).

== Biography ==
Born and raised in Milwaukee, Wisconsin, Maize attended Pius XI High School. He received a Bachelor of Fine Arts in musical theater with a minor in communications and a minor in dance from Millikin University in Decatur, Illinois. After graduation, he relocated to Los Angeles where he worked in television commercials before launching his film and television career.

== Career ==
Among Maize's television roles include parts in Without a Trace, CSI: NY, and The Jamie Foxx Show. He also appeared in the vampire television drama Angel and in Power Rangers in Space.

Maize also has had roles in Hollywood films such as National Treasure: Book of Secrets and Eagle Eye. Maize also featured in the films More Dogs Than Bones and Saving Lincoln (2012). In 2018, Maize played Officer Nico in the first season of the Lifetime thriller series You.

== Filmography ==
=== Film ===
Year	Title	Role	Notes
2000	More Dogs Than Bones	Eugene	
2000	King of the Korner	Bartender	
2007	National Treasure: Book of Secrets	Daniel	
2008	Eagle Eye	Master Sergeant	
2009	Gary's Walk	Rule	
2010	The Grind	Thorwald	
2011	Youthful Journeys of the World	Ryan the Band's Manager	
2011	The Casserole Club	Max Beedum	
2012	The Pyrex Glitch	Detective	
2013	Saving Lincoln	Billy Herndon	
2015	Kiss Me, Kill Me	Albert	
2019	Bottom of the 9th	Tommy	

=== Television ===
Year	Title	Role	Notes
1997	The Jamie Foxx Show	Orderly	Episode: "One Flew Over the County's Nest"
1998	Fame L.A.	Magician	Episode: "Green Eyed Monster"
1998	Power Rangers in Space	Psycho Black / Photon (voice)	7 episodes
1999	The '60s	Leather Hat	2 episodes
1999	Power Rangers Lost Galaxy	Psycho Black / Photon (voice)	Episode: "To the Tenth Power"
2003	NCIS	Security Guard	Episode: "Yankee White"
2003	Angel	Artode	Episode: "Life of the Party"
2004	It's All Relative	Wig Man	Episode: "Oscar Interruptus"
2004	ER	James	Episode: "Drive"
2005	Charmed	Zyke	2 episodes
2005	CSI: NY	Jake Lydell	"Blood, Sweat & Tears"
2005	Numb3rs	Wallace 'Demento' Gordon	Episode: "Convergence"
2006	The Valley of Light	Lean Man	Television film
2006	Kitchen Confidential	Gunman #2	Episode: "The Robbery"
2007	Raines	Dexter / Skeezy guy	Episode: "5th Step"
2007	Final Approach	Lyons	Television film
2009	Without a Trace	Donny	Episode: "Undertow"
2009	Dark Blue	Coleman, crew member	Episode: "Pilot"
2010	Justified	Drunk #2	Episode: "Hatless"
2011	Castle	Hank Roszell	Episode: "Law & Murder"
2011	No Ordinary Family	Ben	Episode: "No Ordinary Beginning"
2011	The Mentalist	Officer Gary O'Donnell	Episode: "Redacted"
2012	Vegas	Ty	Episode: "Solid Citizens"
2012	Grimm	Adrian Zayne	Episode: "The Hour of Death"
2013	True Blood	Smarmy Guard	3 episodes
2015	Murder in the First	Neil Whitford	Episode: "State of the Union"
2015	Hawaii Five-0	Aaron James	2 episodes
2016	The Blacklist	Iverson	Episode: "The Director (No. 24): Conclusion"
2016	Blue Bloods	Derek Gibbs	Episode: "Cursed"
2016	Rizzoli & Isles	Trooper J.D. Miller	Episode: "A Shot in the Dark"
2016	Mr. Robot	Lone Star	6 episodes
2017	Iron Fist	Dink	Episode: "Shadow Hawk Takes Flight"
2017	Over & Out	Randy	Television film
2017	Story of a Girl	Mr. North	Television film
2017	Gotham	Grady Harris	3 episodes
2017–2019	Happy!	Le Dic	4 episodes
2018	You	Officer Nico	2 episodes
2019	NOS4A2	Ives	Episode: "The Shorter Way"
2021	FBI: Most Wanted	Sam Rutledge	Episode: "Dysfunction"
2021	Chicago P.D.	Roy Walton	2 episodes
2022	Charmed	Frank	2 episodes
2022	Pretty Little Liars: Original Sin	Joseph 'Crazy Joe' England	3 episodes
2023	Killing It	Douglas	Episode: "It Follows"
2023	Dr. Death	Percy	2 episodes
2025	Will Trent	Ike Cass	Episode: "One of Us Now"
2025	Task	Derek Nance	Episode: "Crossings"
2026	NCIS: Origins	Linus Eckles	Episode: "Rule 13"

=== Video games ===
- Red Dead Redemption 2 (2018), Skinners (voice)
