= Baylee Littrell =

American singer (born 2002)

- Born: Baylee Thomas Wylee Littrell; November 26, 2002 (age 23); Atlanta, Georgia, U.S.
- Occupations: Singer, songwriter
- Years active: 2010–present
- Parents: Brian Littrell (father); Leighanne Littrell (mother)
- Relatives: Kevin Richardson (first cousin, once removed)
- Musical career
- Genre: Country
- Instruments: Vocals; guitar
- Website: bayleelittrell.com

Baylee Thomas Wylee Littrell (born November 26, 2002) is an American country singer. His debut album, 770-Country, was released on November 15, 2019.

== Early life ==
Littrell was born on November 26, 2002, in Atlanta to model and actress Leighanne Wallace and Backstreet Boys member Brian Littrell. He is an only child.

Littrell played on Little League baseball and basketball teams, both coached by his father. He was active in karate, lacrosse, football, and soccer. When he was six, he developed Kawasaki syndrome, characterized by a collection of symptoms caused by swollen blood vessels around his heart. When he was around seven or eight he began to be homeschooled and was able to skip a grade at home and on the road. He was an actor and a singer while being homeschooled. His father has been his musical director and his mother his manager.

== Career ==
=== Early career ===
Littrell became involved in music when he was two years old, accompanying his father on the Never Gone Tour. However, he never really got into music until around first grade, when he attended band, theater, and acting camps during the summer. Later, he even began writing songs consisting of short poems, when he was six or seven. His piano teacher heard him sing when he was six. By the time when Littrell was 8 years old, he did a skit with his cousin and was in a band; he realized that he wanted to be a performer follow his parents' footsteps even if they had concerns about that type of career. He started taking lessons in acting, singing, playing the piano, and had guitar instruction from his father, Brian.

=== Broadway ===
When he was 13, his family left their Atlanta home for the Upper West Side of Manhattan while Littrell made his Broadway debut in the musical Disaster! playing twins Ben and Lisa on March 8, 2016, at the Nederlander Theatre. He received a Drama Desk nomination for the performance in 2016.

=== Solo artist ===
By the time he was nine, he was opening arena shows for his father and the Backstreet Boys worldwide, usually performing two songs. After being on Broadway, he announced to his parents that he wanted to start his career as a country artist, which he did, writing his songs and listening to Florida Georgia Line. On April 3, 2019, the Backstreet Boys announced Littrell as an opening act for their North American leg of the DNA World Tour. The tour ran from July 12, 2019 in Washington D.C. at the Capital One Arena until September 2019.

Starting on October 31, 2019, Littrell joined American country music artist Chris Lane for a string of performances on his Big Big Plans tour in Cincinnati, Ohio; Louisville, Kentucky; and Atlanta. On November 15, 2019, Littrell released his debut album, 770-Country, via BriLeigh Records. The album includes songwriting and production from Gary Baker, Corey Crowder, Seth Ennis, Tyler Hubbard, Steven Lee Olsen, Daniel Ross, and Littrell. It features "Boxes," "Don't Knock It," and "We Run This Beach." In May 2022, he announced that he was working on a second album.

On July 27, Littrell joined his father, cousin (once removed) Kevin Richardson, and the rest of the Backstreet Boys in a charity softball game in Columbus, Ohio, for On Our Sleeves, a Nationwide Children's Hospital mental health charity.

On September 9, 2022, he released his first ep, EP Vol. One.

In March 2025, Littrell appeared on American Idol and was given a golden ticket to Hollywood. He also sang a short duo with his father on the show. His appearance on the show sparked some controversy, with some viewers saying that due to him being a "nepo baby", he should not be on a program meant for undiscovered talent.

== Influences ==
Littrell said that some of his biggest musical influences include Tim McGraw (his greatest inspiration), Florida Georgia Line, George Strait, and Johnny Cash. Other than his father, he says that his favorite Backstreet Boy member is AJ McLean.

== Discography ==
=== Albums ===
Title	Details
770-Country	Released: 15 November 2019; Label: BriLeigh; Format: LP, digital download, streaming

=== EPs ===
Title	Details
EP, Vol. 1	Released: 9 September 2022; Label: BriLeigh; Format: Digital download, streaming

=== Singles ===
List of singles released as main artist, showing year released and album name
Title	Year	Peak chart positions	Album
Title	Year	US Pop	Album
"Don't Knock It"	2018	—	770-Country
"Boxes"	2019	—	770-Country
"We Run This Beach"	2019	—	770-Country
"Some Guys"	2019	—	770-Country
"Gone"	2022	—	EP, Vol. 1
"Change Your Mind"	2022	—	EP, Vol. 1
"Hey Jesus"	2025	—	Non-album singles
"So Be It"	2026	35	Non-album singles
