= Me & My Piano =

Studio album by Krystal Harris
- Released: June 5, 2001
- Recorded: 2000–2001
- Genres: Pop; soul; R&B
- Length: 48:50
- Label: Geffen/KBAHN Records
- Producers: Jimmy Harry and Patrick Leonard

Me & My Piano is the only studio album from American singer-songwriter Krystal Harris as Krystal.

The only single from the album was "Supergirl!" and was featured in the Disney teen film The Princess Diaries. Also a remixed version of "Love Is A Beautiful Thing" is featured on the Legally Blonde soundtrack. Me & My Piano's final peak on the Billboard Top 200 chart was #86. "My Religion" was also featured on discs two and three of the Backstreet Boys' For the Fans live compilation set as a hidden track on each disc.

== Track listing ==
1. "Supergirl!"
2. "My Religion"
3. "Angel On My Shoulder"
4. "You're The Reason" (featuring AJ McLean)
5. "Love Is A Beautiful Thing"
6. "...Or Someone Else Will"
7. "When You Hurt"
8. "1/2 My Heart"
9. "Goodbye"
10. "Lead Me"
11. "Let Me Be Your Friend"
12. "Me & My Piano"

== Singles ==
- "Supergirl!" (Summer 2001)
