= Brian Littrell =

American singer, member of the Backstreet Boys (born 1975)

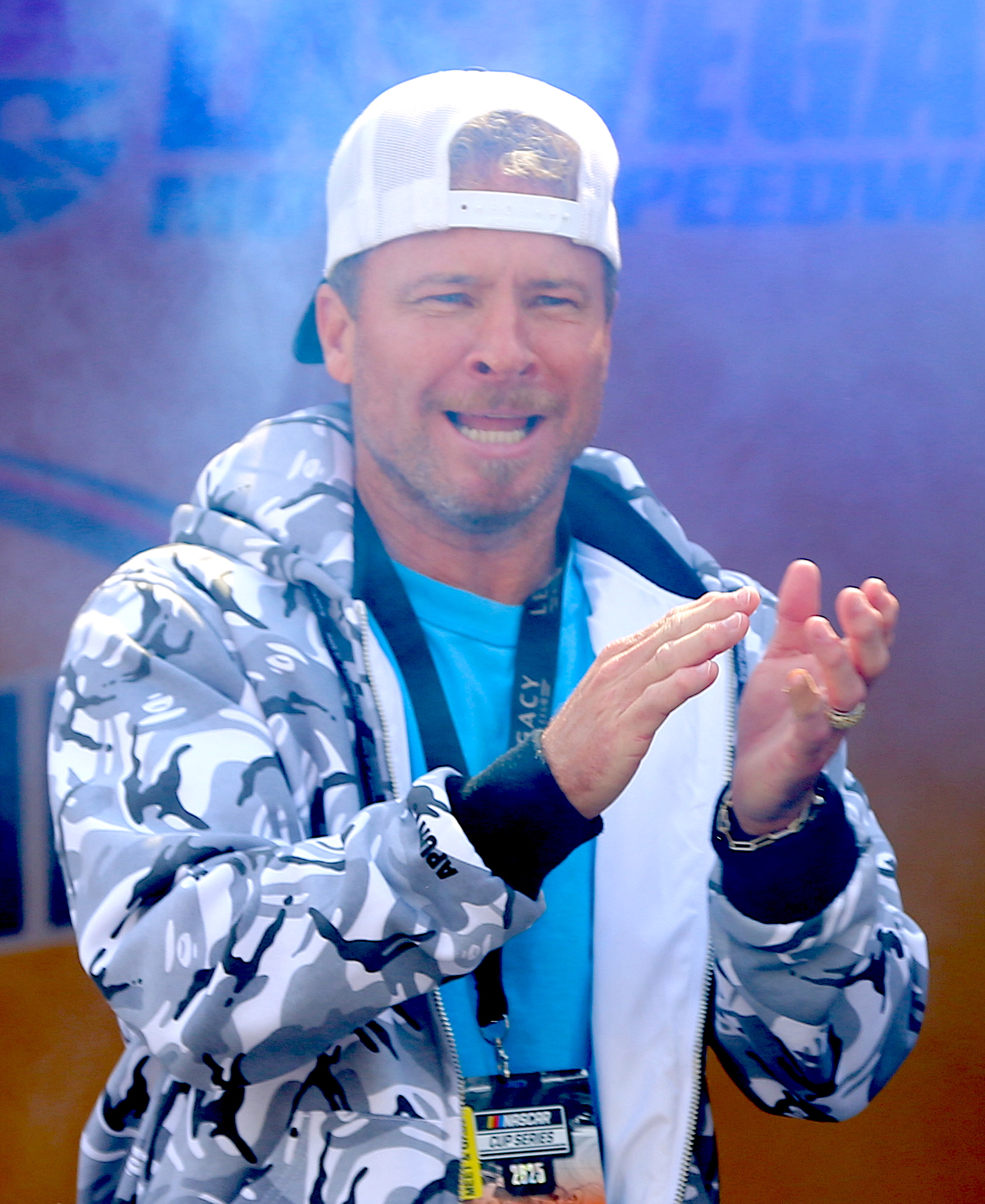
- Littrell at Las Vegas Motor Speedway in 2025
- Born: Brian Thomas Littrell; February 20, 1975 (age 51); Lexington, Kentucky, U.S.
- Education: Tates Creek High School
- Occupations: Singer; songwriter
- Years active: 1993–present
- Spouse: Leighanne Wallace (m. 2000)
- Children: Baylee Littrell (b. 2002)
- Relatives: Kevin Richardson (cousin)
- Musical career
- Genres: Pop; R&B; CCM
- Instruments: Vocals; guitar
- Labels: Reunion; Jive
- Member of: Backstreet Boys
- Formerly of: NKOTBSB
- Website: brianlittrell.com

Signature
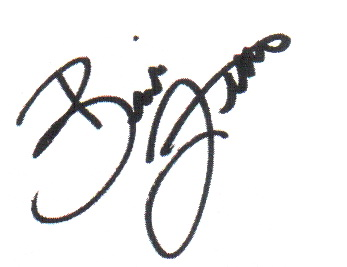

Brian Thomas Littrell (/ˈlɪtrəl/; born February 20, 1975) is an American singer and a member of the Backstreet Boys. He is also a contemporary Christian music artist and released the solo album Welcome Home in 2006. He is the father of country singer Baylee Littrell.

In 2015, Littrell was inducted into the Kentucky Music Hall of Fame along with his cousin and bandmate Kevin Richardson.

== Early life ==
Littrell was born in Lexington, Kentucky, to Jacqueline "Jackie" R. (née Fox), a dentist's secretary, and Harold Baker Littrell Jr., an IBM employee. He has an older brother, Harold III, who is an actor and singer. Littrell is the cousin of fellow Backstreet Boys member Kevin Richardson; his father, Harold, and Richardson's mother, Ann, are siblings.

Littrell was skilled at sports and played in both Little League and the Babe Ruth League. Growing up in a religious Baptist family, he sang his first solo in Porter Memorial Baptist Church at age 7, and was voted President of the Youth Chorus by his peers one year. At 14, he began performing at weddings after Barry Turner, his choir teacher at Tates Creek High School, suggested he could make money singing at social events. Littrell also performed in school plays, including a production of Grease, and worked at fast food chain Long John Silver's.

Prior to his singing career, Littrell aspired to become a basketball player, but was seldom selected for high school tournaments due to his height at 5 feet 7 inches (170 cm). He also aspired to become a music minister.

== Career ==
=== Backstreet Boys ===
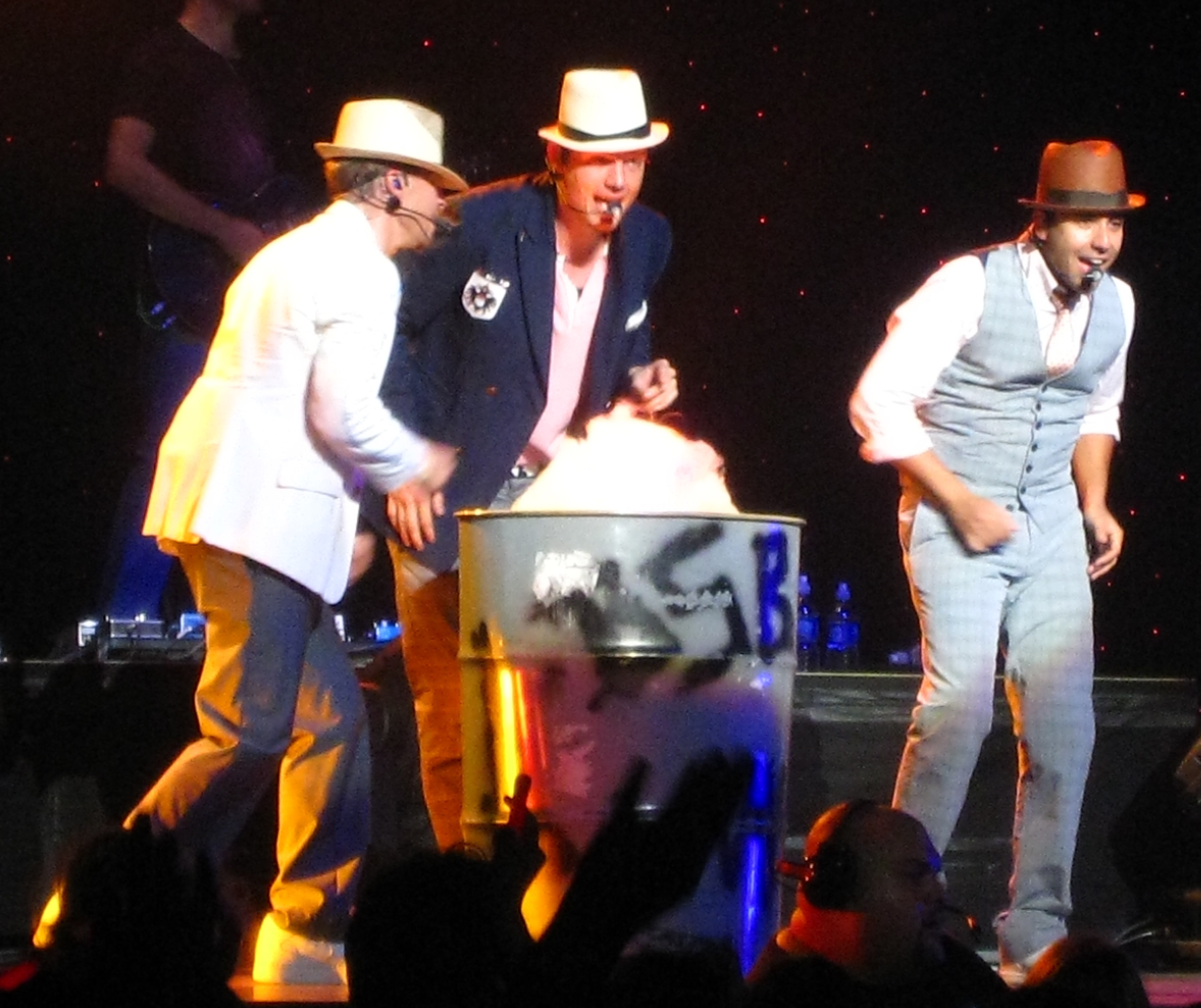
Littrell (left) with the Backstreet Boys in 2008

In April 1993, Littrell's cousin and future bandmate Kevin Richardson called him out of an American History class and informed him of an audition for a fifth member of the Backstreet Boys after original member Burk Parsons left the group to become a Christian minister. Littrell flew to Orlando the next day and finished high school via correspondence, graduating in 1994.

In 1997, Littrell was instrumental in bringing a lawsuit against the group's creator Lou Pearlman, claiming Pearlman had concealed information regarding the group's earnings. Bandmates AJ McLean, Richardson, and Howie Dorough joined the lawsuit, which eventually resulted in a number of settlements, the details of which were not disclosed. In 2000, he was among Teen People's 25 Hottest People Under 25, tying with Justin Timberlake of rival band *NSYNC.

=== Christian music ===
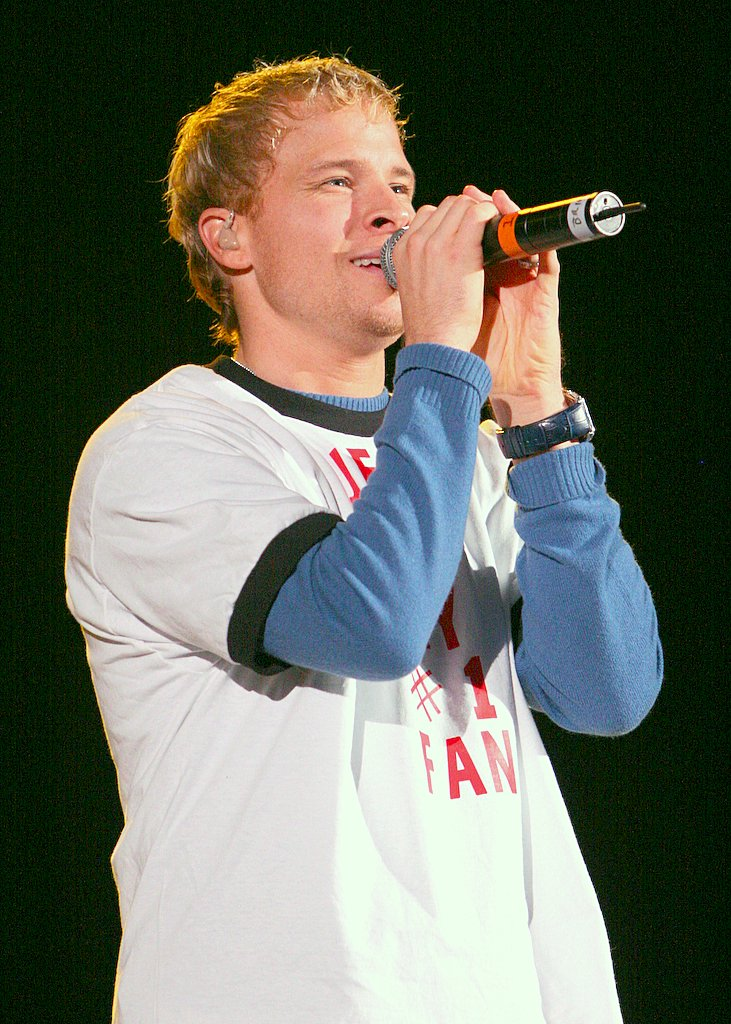
Littrell performing in 2005

Littrell longed to record Christian music, a genre he described as "pop positive." In 2004, Littrell signed a solo deal with Reunion Records and released the solo album Welcome Home in 2005. Littrell co-wrote six of the songs on the album, which sold over 100,000 copies in the US and reached No. 74 on the Billboard 200 charts. On the Christian album charts, Welcome Home debuted at No. 3. Four singles were released from the album – "In Christ Alone", "Wish," "Over My Head," and "Welcome Home (You)", with the latter reaching No. 2 on the US Christian AC Charts. For three weeks, it was also No. 1 on Reach FM's Top 40 chart and on the US R&R Christian Inspirational charts. In the summer of 2005, his solo single, "In Christ Alone", went to No. 1 on the Christian charts. Despite this change in his career, he remains a member of the Backstreet Boys.

Littrell won a Dove Award for Inspirational Recorded Song of the Year ("In Christ Alone") in 2006 along with songwriters Don Koch and Shawn Craig, and another in 2008 for "By His Wounds" with Glory Revealed. He also won Special Event Album of the Year in 2008 for Glory Revealed, which was a compilation album with many other Christian artists, and in 2010, Special Event Album of the Year for Glory Revealed II.

Littrell released two Christmas collections featuring his wife Leighanne and son Baylee, Brian Littrell's Family Christmas, released on December 6, 2010, and Christmas with the Littrells, released on December 6, 2011.

=== TV and film appearances ===
Littrell made appearances with the Backstreet Boys on Arthur, Sesame Street, and Sabrina the Teenage Witch, and he and bandmate McLean had cameos in Olive Juice, a film starring Littrell's wife Leighanne. Littrell also performed with The Backstreet Boys on Saturday Night Live in 1998 and 1999. In 2013, Littrell appeared with his bandmates in the film This Is the End.

=== Other ventures ===
During the band's hiatus, Littrell became committed to a number of other show business activities, most of them for charity. He has joined other celebrities in yearly NBA tours where he played basketball in every NBA city before a game, and has also played charity baseball, softball, and golf games.

== Personal life ==
=== Relationships ===
In June 1997, following the breakup of his relationship with girlfriend Samantha Stonebraker, Littrell met model Leighanne Wallace on the set of the "As Long as You Love Me" video shoot where she was an extra. Littrell stated in J-14 magazine about this relationship that he had been out of the dating game for a while and meeting Leighanne opened a whole new chapter for him. "I had just gotten out of a relationship with a high school sweetheart that didn't work out. I didn't really have my eyes or mind set on anybody. It was something that just happened. If I was looking, I wouldn't have been able to find her." Littrell and Wallace dated for two years, and he proposed to her on Christmas 1999. Their engagement, along with the engagement of cousin and bandmate Kevin Richardson to Kristin Willits, was announced on MTV on February 15, 2000. The couple married on September 2, 2000, at Peachtree Christian Church in Atlanta.

On September 11, 2001, Leighanne was scheduled to board American Airlines Flight 11, which was later hijacked and flown into the World Trade Center as part of the 9/11 attacks. Leighanne Littrell had canceled her flight the previous night. On November 26, 2002, they had their son Baylee Thomas Wylee Littrell, who is now pursuing a similar path as his father's in the entertainment industry.

As of 2024, the family lives in Alpharetta, Georgia, near Atlanta, having been there since 2000, soon after Littrell and his wife got engaged.

Littrell stated during a show in Georgia on the DNA World Tour that his wife lost her mother from a heart condition in June 2022 and was a matriarch to him and the family.

=== Health issues ===
Littrell was born with a congenital heart condition, making him susceptible to infections. He was diagnosed with a heart murmur when he was six weeks old. At age five, he was hospitalized for two months due to a bacterial infection. Due to his hospitalization, Littrell was held back in school and had to repeat the first grade.

In November 1997, doctors found that Littrell's heart condition had caused his heart to enlarge considerably. Littrell postponed open-heart surgery to meet touring obligations. He underwent open-heart surgery on May 8, 1998. Littrell's surgery was referred to in his scenes in the band's music video for "Show Me the Meaning of Being Lonely." He later established the Brian Littrell Healthy Heart Club, a non-profit organization assisting children with heart conditions.

In October 2009, Littrell became infected with swine flu, causing the cancellation of the Backstreet Boys' This Is Us promotional tour.

In the 2015 documentary film Backstreet Boys: Show 'Em What You're Made Of, Littrell revealed his 2011 diagnosis of muscle tension dysphonia. He has worked with a therapist to help improve his condition.

=== Religious beliefs ===
A devout Christian, Littrell has stated he believes Christians have to be open about their faith, saying, "I think as Christians we need to join hands and mount up together and lift God up and talk about our faith publicly and talk about all of the things God has done for us in our life to touch other people." Littrell, who has been born again since the age of 8, has said that he attributes his success in life to God and that his faith has always been "the utmost important thing" in his life.

=== Heritage ===
In 2019, a DNA heritage test revealed Littrell's ancestry to be 90.1% British Isles (20.7% English and 70.1% Irish, Scottish, Welsh), plus 7.1% Finnish and 2.1% Scandinavian.

== Filmography ==
TV series & Movies
Year	Film	Role	Notes
1998	Sabrina the Teenage Witch	Himself	Episode: "The Band Episode"
1998–1999	Saturday Night Live	Himself and Musical guest	"Julianne Moore/Backstreet Boys" (Season 23: episode 16) "Sarah Michelle Gellar/Backstreet Boys" (Season 24: episode 19)
2000	Olive Juice	Carriage Driver	
2002	Arthur	Himself	Episode: "Arthur, It's Only Rock and Roll" Guest Voice
2002	Sesame Street	Himself	
2002	Megalodon (2002 film)	Rig Worker	Film was later released in the United States in February 2004
2004	Hollywood Squares	Himself	Celebrity panelist, with Leighanne Littrell
2005	The Ellen DeGeneres Show	Himself	Musical Guest with the Backstreet Boys
2006	The 700 Club	Himself	
2009	El Hormiguero	Himself	Musical Guest with the Backstreet Boys
2012	Late Night with Jimmy Fallon	Himself	Musical Guest with Backstreet Boys
2013	This Is the End	Himself	With the Backstreet Boys, performing "Everybody (Backstreet's Back)"
2013	El Hormiguero		Musical Guest with the Backstreet Boys
2014	I Heart Nick Carter	Himself	minor
2015	Backstreet Boys: Show 'Em What You're Made Of	Himself	Documentary Film
2016	Undateable	Himself	Episodes: "The Backstreet Boys Walk Into a Bar: Part I" and "Part II"
2017	CMT Crossroads	Himself	Episode: "Florida Georgia Line & Backstreet Boys"
2021	Dynasty	Himself	Everybody Loves The Carringtons (Season 4, Episode 4) performing "I Want It That Way (Solo Acoustic)"

== Discography ==
=== Albums ===
Year	Album details	Peak positions		Sales
Year	Album details	US	US Christian	Sales
2006	Welcome Home: Released: May 2, 2006; Label: Reunion	74	3	US: 100,000
2010	Brian Littrell's Family Christmas: Released: December 6, 2010; Label: Reunion	—	—	
2011	Christmas with the Littrells: Released: December 6, 2011; Label: Reunion	—	—	

=== Singles ===
Year	Single	Peak		Album
Year	Single	US Christian	US Christian AC	Album
2005	"In Christ Alone"	23	21	Welcome Home
2006	"Welcome Home (You)"	4	2	Welcome Home
2006	"Wish"	—	—	Welcome Home
2007	"Over My Head"	20	16	Welcome Home
2007	"By His Wounds" (with Mac Powell, Mark Hall and Steven Curtis Chapman)	8	6	Glory Revealed
2010	"How Great" (with Mac Powell, Shane Everett and Jonathan Shelton)	48	—	Glory Revealed II

== See also ==
- List of Christian worship music artists
