= Blackhat (film) =

2015 film by Michael Mann

- Theatrical release poster
- Directed by: Michael Mann
- Written by: Morgan Davis Foehl
- Produced by: Thomas Tull; Michael Mann; Jon Jashni
- Starring: Chris Hemsworth; Tang Wei; Viola Davis; Ritchie Coster; Holt McCallany; Yorick van Wageningen; Wang Leehom
- Cinematography: Stuart Dryburgh
- Edited by: Joe Walker; Stephen E. Rivkin; Jeremiah O'Driscoll; Mako Kamitsuna
- Music by: Harry Gregson-Williams; Atticus Ross; Leo Ross
- Production companies: Legendary Pictures; Forward Pass
- Distributed by: Universal Pictures
- Release dates: January 8, 2015 (Los Angeles); January 16, 2015 (United States)
- Running time: 134 minutes
- Country: United States
- Language: English
- Budget: $70 million
- Box office: $19.7 million

Blackhat is a 2015 American action thriller film produced and directed by Michael Mann, written by Morgan Davis Foehl, and starring Chris Hemsworth, Tang Wei, Viola Davis, and Wang Leehom. Hemsworth portrays a convicted hacker offered clemency for helping track down a dangerous cybercriminal. The title refers to the cybersecurity term "black hat," meaning a hacker with malicious intent.

The film premiered at the TCL Chinese Theatre in Los Angeles on January 8, 2015, and was released in theaters on January 16, by Universal Pictures. Blackhat was a box-office bomb, earning only $19.7 million at the box office against a budget of $70 million. The film received generally mixed reviews, with criticisms focused on casting and pace, though the film appeared on some critics' year-end lists.

A re-edited director's cut of the film was released on home video in November 2023.

== Plot ==
Note: The plot synopsis refers to the theatrical cut of the film. Differences between the theatrical and director's cut are noted in the Release section.

A nuclear plant in Hong Kong goes into meltdown when a hacker causes the coolant pumps to overheat and explode. Soon after, the Chicago Mercantile Exchange is hacked, causing soy futures to rise. The Chinese government and FBI determine that the hack was performed using a remote access tool. Captain Chen Dawai of the People's Liberation Army cyberwarfare unit is tasked with finding the hacker and enlists the aid of his sister Lien, a networking engineer. He meets with FBI Special Agent Carol Barrett in Los Angeles and reveals core parts of the code in the tool was written by himself and Nicholas Hathaway, his college roommate, during their time at MIT. Dawai requests that Hathaway, who is in prison for hacking banks, be offered a temporary release in exchange for his services. Hathaway, knowing how necessary he is to the investigation, demands new terms: his prison sentence commuted if his assistance leads to the hacker's identification and capture. He is required to wear an ankle bracelet monitor and be accompanied by deputy U.S. Marshal Mark Jessup.

Hathaway manipulates the update system on Jessup's phone GPS that tracks his location, allowing him to follow his own lead and arrange a meeting with the hacker's partner at a restaurant. While they wait, he tells Lien about his past, but the partner does not arrive. Hathaway discovers a camera watching them and, following it to the connected computer, messages the hacker that he is now on his trail.

Clues uncovered by Dawai and Barrett lead the team to Hong Kong, where they work with Police Inspector Alex Trang. The team traces the stock trade money to a paramilitary operative named Elias Kassar. Hathaway, Jessup, Chen, and Trang, along with a Special Duties Unit team, raid Kassar's hideout, and a shootout ensues in a drainage tunnel, resulting in the deaths of Trang and several officers as Kassar and his men escape.

The nuclear plant has stabilized enough to have a data drive recovered from the control room, but it is corrupted by radiation. The National Security Agency's Black Widow software has the ability to repair the data, but they refuse to allow the Chinese access. Reluctantly sanctioned by Barrett, Hathaway hacks into the NSA and uses Black Widow, discovering that the hacker's server is based in Jakarta. Lien finds out the hacker has been buying high-resolution satellite photos of a site near Seri Manjung, Malaysia.

For his illegal hack, the NSA and FBI demand Hathaway's return to prison. Dawai's superiors advise him to turn Hathaway over to the U.S. government, but he instead alerts Hathaway to their plans. Meanwhile, one of Kassar's men, having identified Dawai from official records, secretly plants a tracking device on Dawai's car. As Hathaway and Lien, who have become romantically involved, argue about his fleeing alone, Dawai is killed when his car is destroyed by a rocket launched by Kassar; Barrett and Jessup, arriving on the scene, manage to shoot several of Kassar's men before they are both killed. Lien and Hathaway escape on a subway train, and she uses her connections to charter a plane to Malaysia.

Hathaway deduces that the hacker's attack at the nuclear plant was merely a test for a later plan: to sabotage a large dam and destroy several major tin mines in Malaysia, allowing the hacker to make a profit buying tin options. In Jakarta, he hacks into a bank's computer and transfers the hacker's funds into Hathaway's Swiss bank account, then forcing the hacker, Sadak, to contact him. Sadak and Hathaway agree to meet and discuss a partnership; Hathaway anticipates a double-cross and arms himself with makeshift weapons and body armor which he conceals under his clothes.

Though Hathaway insists Sadak and Kassar come alone, they bring their henchmen. Lien spots them and alerts Hathaway, who orders them to a new location in a park during a large religious procession. Hathaway trails them but is caught at gunpoint by Kassar. As he is being frisked, Hathaway blindsides and stabs Kassar to death with a sharpened screwdriver. Sadak's men catch up and a firefight ensues; Hathaway is shot several times but manages to kill the reinforcements. Sadak stabs Hathaway with a knife before Hathaway kills him. He reunites with Lien, who treats his wounds, before they leave Indonesia.

== Cast ==
- Chris Hemsworth as Nicholas Hathaway
- Tang Wei as Chen Lien
- Leehom Wang as PLA Captain Chen Dawai
- Viola Davis as FBI Special Agent Carol Barrett
- Ritchie Coster as Elias Kassar
- Holt McCallany as Deputy US Marshal Jessup
- Yorick van Wageningen as Sadak, the blackhat
- Andy On as Hong Kong Police Inspector Alex Trang
- Manny Montana as Alonzo Reyes
- William Mapother as NSA Agent Rich Donahue
- Archie Kao as Shum
- Shi Liang as Lieutenant Colonel Zhao
- Cheung Siu Fai as Chow
- Adrian Pang as Keith Yan
- Jason Butler Harner as Frank
- John Ortiz as Henry Pollack

== Production ==
=== Development ===
West Irian Liberation Monument, Jakarta

In an interview done at the LMU Film school, Michael Mann said he was inspired to make Blackhat after reading about the events surrounding Stuxnet, which was a computer worm that targeted and reportedly ruined almost one fifth of Iran's nuclear centrifuges. In keeping with his high standard for authenticity, Mann brought in several technical advisors and consultants like former hackers Kevin Poulsen (senior editor for Wired News) and Christopher McKinlay, to make the film as authentic as possible. McKinlay was famous for hacking the online dating site OkCupid in order to make his profile the most attractive to women. Director Mann also met with Mike Rogers, who was chairman of the Permanent Select Committee on Intelligence until 2015. Parisa Tabriz, who manages Google's information security engineering team, said: "It's the most accurate information security film I've seen."

The film was tentatively titled Cyber; however, the final title was revealed on July 26, 2014, during a panel at San Diego Comic-Con, and it was being estimated that it might qualify for the Oscars. The first official trailer for the film was released on September 25, 2014.

=== Filming ===
Filming began on May 17, 2013, in Los Angeles, California; Hong Kong; Kuala Lumpur, Malaysia. The film's finale was shot at the West Irian Liberation Monument in the Lapangan Banteng park in Jakarta, Indonesia.

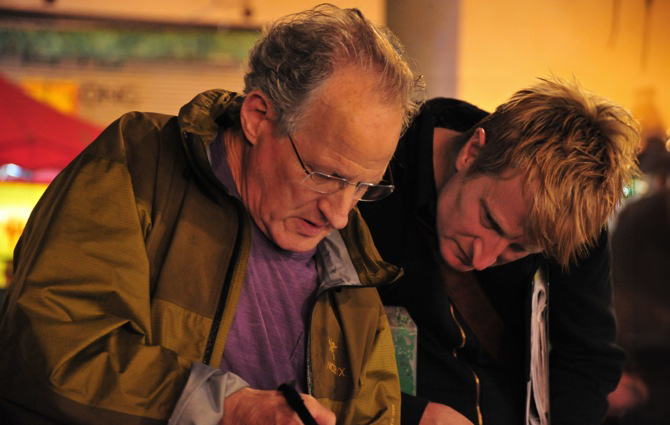
Director Michael Mann and Production Designer Guy Hendrix Dyas during filming on location in Hong Kong.

The film would be Mann's first feature to be shot entirely using digital cameras. Although Collateral, Miami Vice and Public Enemies were predominantly digital features, Mann employed 35 mm film sparingly.

Director Mann donated HK$300,000 (US$38,500) to The Community Chest of Hong Kong in the name of Hang Seng Bank, to thank the bank for allowing him to film Blackhat for five evenings in the bank's lobby area.

In November 2013, Universal set the North American release date for January 16, 2015.

=== Soundtrack ===
The film score was composed by Harry Gregson-Williams with Atticus Ross. Upon viewing the film, however, Gregson-Williams posted a message on Facebook stating that his score went almost unused in the final edit, which included synthesized music not prepared by Ross or himself. He went on to say: "I therefore reluctantly join the long list of composers who have had their scores either sliced and diced mercilessly or ignored completely by Michael Mann." He stated that although he is credited for the score, the final film "contains almost none of my compositions". He later deleted the status update containing this information.

Mann later explained that he often prefers to use more than one composer "to rotate among different emotional perspectives", stating: "If a composer wants to have his music stand alone, he should be a recording artist and let his work contest itself in that arena."

Ryan Amon's score for the film Elysium (2013) was reused in the film. Mike Dean also contributed additional music.

== Themes and interpretation ==
Blackhat, like several of Mann's crime thrillers, is a notable pop-cultural work on the theme of mass surveillance. According to critic Nick Pinkerton, Mann's concern with surveillance follows in the footsteps of earlier films by Fritz Lang and Henry Hathaway. The emerging relationship between power and network technology in the mid-20th century was a major theme in those directors' respective works, particularly Lang's The Thousand Eyes of Dr. Mabuse (1960) and Hathaway's The House on 92nd Street (1945) and Call Northside 777 (1948). Pinkerton suggested that Blackhat's protagonist was named "Hathaway" in an intentional allusion to the latter director.

In an early scene, several books seen on Hathaway's prison-cell bookshelf serve as an "ideological gate key" to the film, according to critic Niles Schwartz. These include books of philosophy and critical theory like Michel Foucault's Discipline and Punish, Jean-François Lyotard's The Postmodern Condition, Jacques Derrida's The Animal That Therefore I Am, Jean Baudrillard's America; a biography of nuclear physicists Ernest Lawrence and J. Robert Oppenheimer; and Brian Greene's The Elegant Universe, an introduction to string theory. Manohla Dargis at The New York Times said that Blackhat demonstrated Mann's "hybrid approach" to filmmaking, "at the crossroads of the classical Hollywood cinema and the European art film", as an action film containing highbrow philosophical references more typical of arthouse cinema from directors like Jean-Luc Godard.

== Release ==
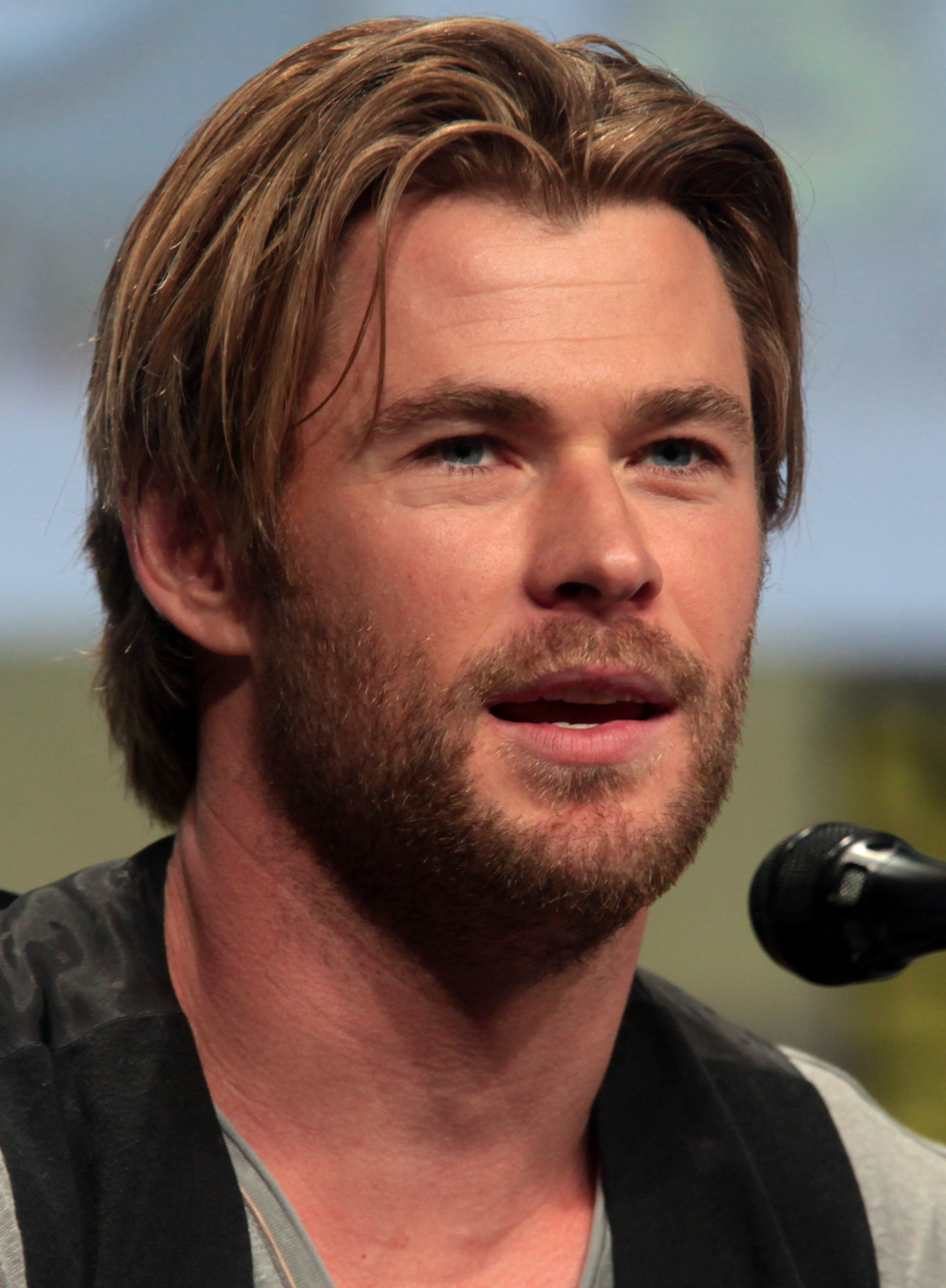
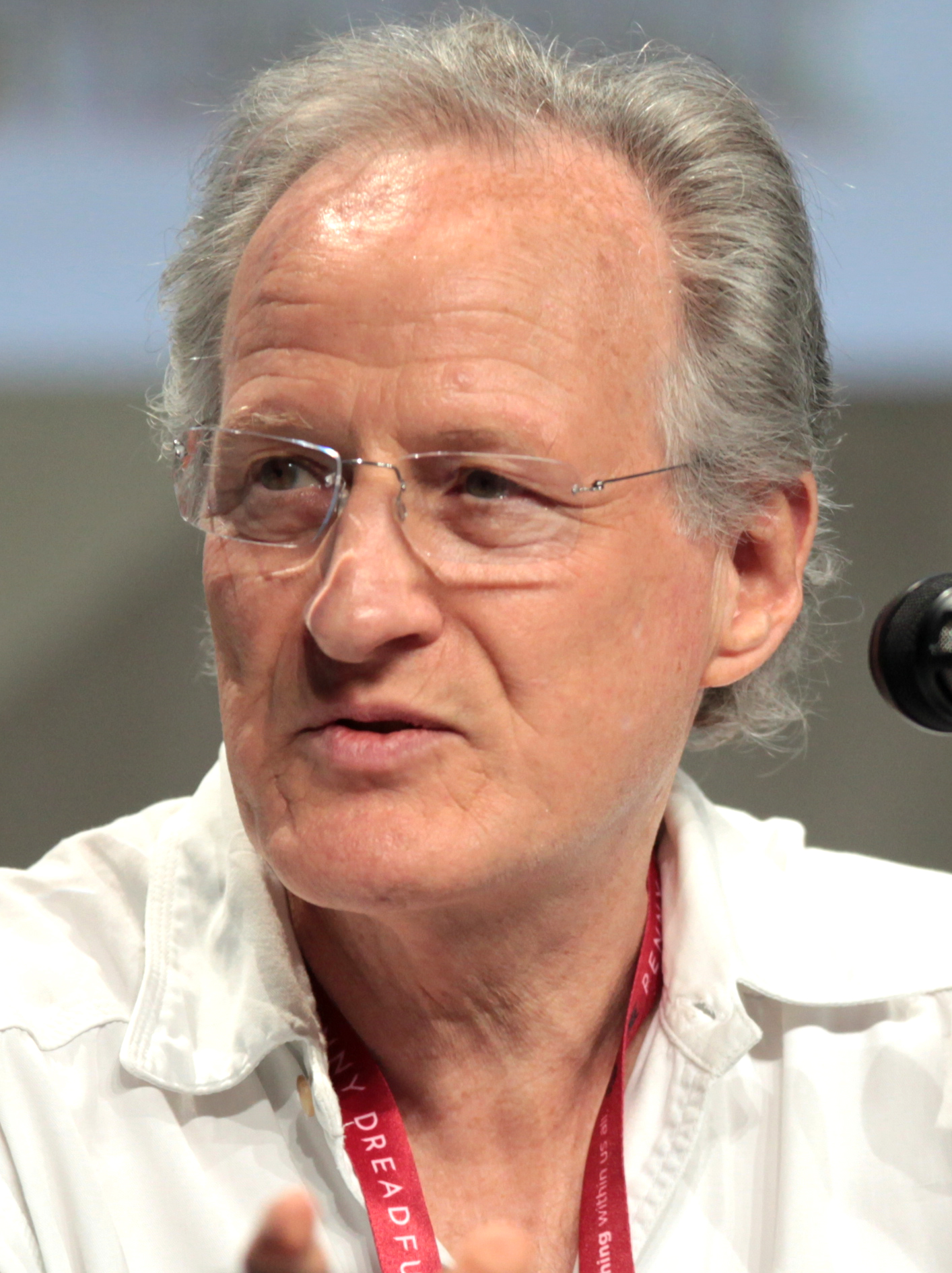
Chris Hemsworth (left) and Michael Mann at the 2014 San Diego Comic Con, promoting the film

Blackhat opened on January 16, 2015, against the wide release of American Sniper, an "unexpected juggernaut", which set records for the largest January opening weekend in history. Blackhat was a box-office bomb, opening at number 11 and earning only $1.7 million on its opening day. It made just $4.4 million for the weekend against its $70 million budget. This made the movie one of the worst debuts ever for a movie playing in over 2,500 locations. After only two weeks, Universal decided to withdraw the film from all but 236 theaters. It had been in 2,568 theaters, making it the sixth-biggest drop in history for a third-week film.

An in-depth analysis by industry trade publication Deadline of why Blackhat did not perform primarily examined the marketing strategy as "the major challenge they were unable to overcome" with independent tracking services supporting this conclusion: "total awareness for Blackhat was in the 40–50% range on January 4 and grew to 50–60% on January 15 (versus American Sniper's 80–90%)." Additionally, "the film wasn't helped by a marketing campaign that failed to convey a sophisticated plot and a romance... Blackhat instead chased a young audience with action footage that did not seem fresh."

Internationally, the film grossed $2.33 million in 19 territories in its opening weekend. It played below expectations in markets including Denmark, Greece, Poland, Taiwan, Turkey and Vietnam. Deadline credited Wang Leehom and Tang Wei's inclusion with increased success in other nations including Indonesia, Malaysia, Singapore and Thailand. The film was anticipating great success in China, where Wang and Tang are household names, but the film was not approved by the government for exhibition, and it never showed. In its third weekend, the film grossed $1.8 million with openings of $595,000 and $446,000 in Russia and Spain, respectively. In its fourth weekend, the film grossed $1.2 million for a total of $8.4 million, with its top opener in Germany at $526,000.

Due to the less-than-stellar numbers at the American and Asian box offices, Universal Pictures International opted not to release Blackhat theatrically in Australia. The film was also scrapped for a theatrical release in Belgium.

In the aftermath, Legendary took a $90 million write-down on the film.

On February 20, 2015, Blackhat debuted in the UK.

=== Home media ===
Blackhat was released on Blu-ray and DVD on May 12, 2015, in North America. The Blu-ray edition includes both a DVD copy of the film and a voucher for an UltraViolet/iTunes digital copy, as well as three featurettes: "The Cyber Threat", "On Location Around the World" and "Creating Reality". The DVD edition contains only one featurette: "Creating Reality".

In Australia, the film was originally slated to be released theatrically on February 25, 2015, but due to its poor performance at the U.S. box office, it was instead released straight to home video on May 14, 2015. In the UK, the film was also released on Blu-ray and DVD on June 22, 2015.

Arrow Films announced an Ultra HD Blu-ray for release in May, 2023. The release was delayed to June, then to September, then to October 31, and finally to November 27 in the UK followed by the North American release on November 28. It includes the theatrical, international, and director's cuts of the film, the same supplements as the Blu-ray, and new interviews with cinematographer Stuart Dryburgh and production designer Guy Hendrix Dyas. The international cut of the film is identical to the US theatrical cut, except for the removal of a portion of a scene in which Barrett identifies one of the villains by his gang tattoos.

=== Director's cut ===
Michael Mann premiered a re-edited version of the film at the Brooklyn Academy of Music on February 20, 2016, which was labeled a "revised cut." The re-edited version played once, as part of a retrospective series of Mann's films. The primary change in this cut was the movement of the film's nuclear reactor attack sequence from the opening to the middle of the film. Mann originally intended to place the reactor sequence in the middle, but moved it to the beginning of the theatrical cut just before its release. Other changes from the theatrical cut include shortened dialogue and added scenes; dialogue is removed between Lien and Hathaway just before their sex scene, after they escape the Koreatown restaurant; a new sequence was added, showing Hathaway, Lien and Jessup evading a tail upon their arrival in Hong Kong; and a new scene was added of a cargo vessel full of soy being denied entry to the Port of Rotterdam.

The new cut premiered on the FX cable channel on May 9, 2017, with some further changes and remix, and was labeled a director's cut. In 2018, it was made available exclusively on DirecTV, for a limited time.

Arrow Video released the 132-minute director's cut commercially for the first time in 2023, as a bonus feature in 1080p, included with the Limited Edition versions of their 4K Ultra HD Blu-ray and Blu-ray releases of the movie on November 27, 2023, in the UK and November 28, 2023, in the US and Canada.

== Reception ==
=== Critical response ===
On Rotten Tomatoes, the film has an approval rating of 33% based on 191 reviews, with an average rating of 4.90/10. The site's critical consensus reads: "Thematically timely, but dramatically inert, Blackhat strands Chris Hemsworth in a muddled misfire from director Michael Mann." On Metacritic, the film has a weighted average score of 51 out of 100, based on 37 critics, indicating "mixed or average" reviews. Audiences polled by CinemaScore gave the film a grade of "C−" on an A+ to F scale.

For many critics, a significant issue of the film was the casting of Chris Hemsworth as a hacker. Christy Lemire in the Chicago Sun-Times stated in her review: "Anyone who makes his or her way in the world sitting in front of a computer screen all day is not going to look as hunky as Hemsworth." Hemsworth himself was unsatisfied with his performance, saying, "I didn't enjoy what I did in the film ... It just felt flat, and it was also an attempt to do what I thought people might have wanted to see. But I don't think I'm good in that space."

Manohla Dargis of The New York Times gave the film a largely positive review, stating: "Michael Mann's thriller Blackhat, a story about the intersection of bodies and machines, is a spectacular work of unhinged moviemaking." Kenneth Turan of the Los Angeles Times also gave it a positive review, writing: "It lures us in with the promise of up-to-the-minute villainy, but the satisfactions of Blackhat are surprisingly old school." The Hollywood Reporter's Sheri Linden noted: "The essential problem of cyber-thrillers is one that even so gifted a director hasn't quite solved, particularly in the film's first half: Characters looking at computer screens and explaining the significance of what they see doesn't make for the most riveting viewing." Matt Zoller Seitz, the editor-in-chief of RogerEbert.com, gave Blackhat three-and-a-half out of four stars, stating in his review: "Blackhat is mainly about what happens when the real world is annexed by the virtual: what it does to geography and relationships; how it signal-jams our species' sense of time as a series of self-contained moments, and substitutes an existence that can feel like an endless, intrusive buzz."

About the negative reception, Michael Mann said: "It's my responsibility. The script was not ready to shoot. The subject may have been ahead of the curve, because there were a number of people who thought this was all fantasy. Wrong. Everything is stone-cold accurate."

== Accolades ==
=== Year-end lists ===
Although Blackhat received generally mixed reviews, many critics found merit in its filmmaking to include it in their "best-of" lists for 2015. In Sight & Sound magazine's poll for the best films of 2015, six critics voted for it as one of the five best films of the year.

- 2nd – Andrew Wright – Parallax View
- 3rd – Michael Nordine – Village Voice
- 4th – Ben Sachs – Chicago Reader
- 6th – Bruce Reid – Parallax View
- 7th – Scout Tafoya – RogerEbert.com
- 8th – Danny Bowes – RogerEbert.com
- 8th – Staff consensus – Slant
- 10th – Brian Doan – RogerEbert.com
- 11th – Matt Zoller Seitz – RogerEbert.com

=== Awards ===
Award	Category	Recipient(s)	Result	Ref.
Huading Awards	Global Best Actor	Chris Hemsworth	Won	
Huading Awards	Global Best Director	Michael Mann	Won	
Teen Choice Awards	Choice Movie Actor – Drama	Chris Hemsworth	Nominated	
