= Avi Zev Weider =

American director, writer, producer editor and sound mixer

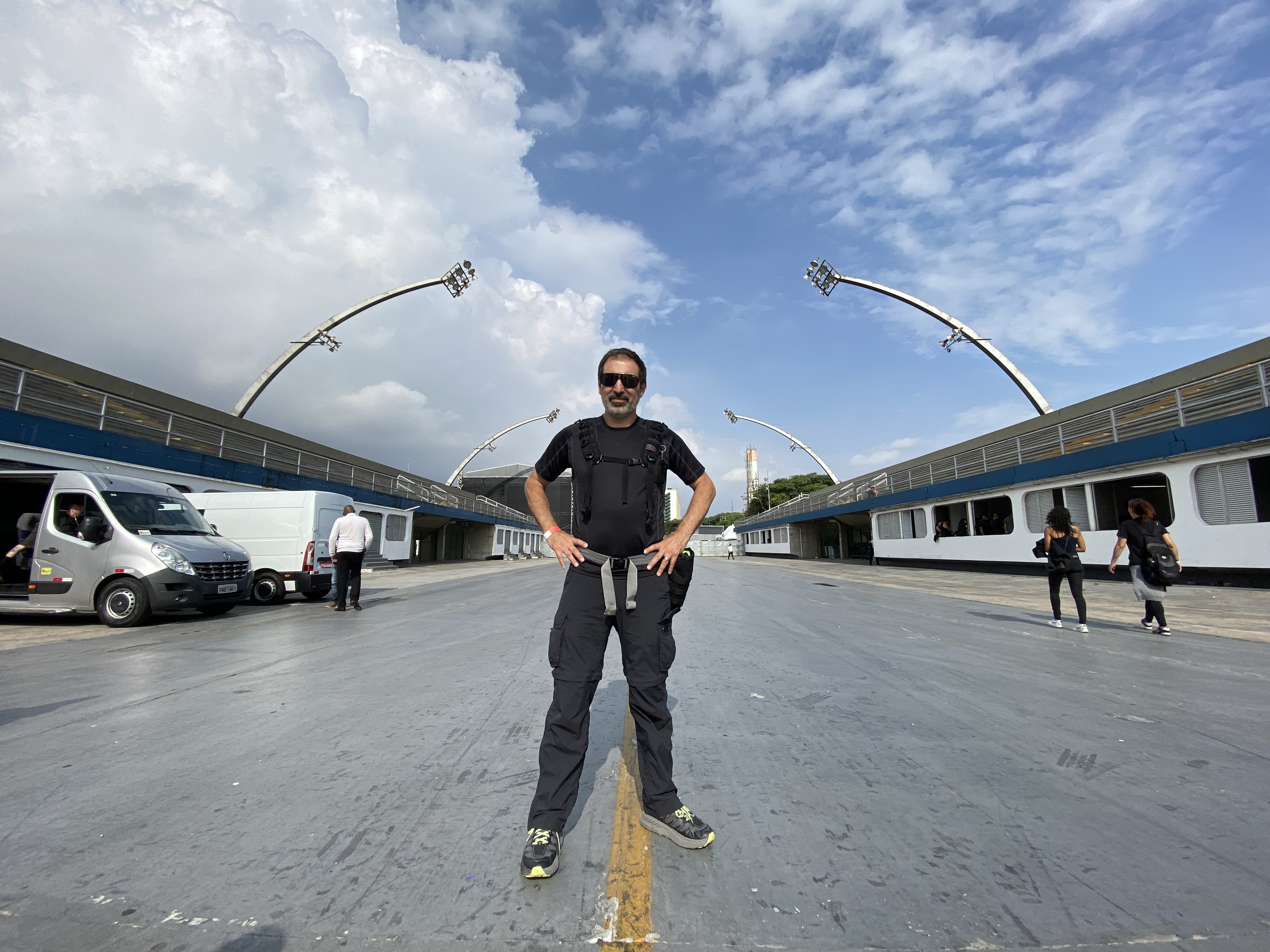
- Born: Cincinnati, Ohio, U.S.
- Occupations: Film Director; Screenwriter; Producer; Sound mixer
- Years active: 1998–present

Avi Zev Weider is an American film director, writer, producer, and sound mixer. He is best known for his work on the films Welcome to the Machine and I Remember.

== Career ==
Avi wrote, directed, and produced the short film, I Remember, which premiered at the Sundance Film Festival in 1998. He is the owner of the production company LOOP Filmworks. He wrote and developed the Sloan Foundation and Sundance Institute-supported project Zeros and Ones. He is the recipient of a 2008 New York Foundation for the Arts (NYFA) Fellowship in screenwriting and a 2009 Sloan Fellowship for Zeroes and Ones. In 2012, his feature documentary, Welcome to the Machine premiered at South by Southwest. As a sound supervisor, designer, and mixer, Avi has credits in the broadcast, cable, studio, livestream, and feature film.

== Filmography ==
Year	Title	Contribution	Note
2023	American Santa	Director, Editor, and Producer	Short Documentary
2018	Ghostbox Cowboy	Story Producer	Feature film
2012	Welcome to the Machine	Director, writer, editor, and Producer	Documentary
2012	Danland	Producer	Documentary
2006	Scott Walker: 30 Century Man	Associate producer	Documentary
2002	Cinemania	Associate producer	Documentary
1998	I Remember	Director, writer, and producer	Short film

=== As sound mixer ===
- Gossip (2021)
- Doctor's Orders (2021)
- Lady Boss: The Jackie Collins Story (2021)
- Street Gang: How We Got to Sesame Street (2021)
- I Am Greta (2020)
- Surviving Jeffrey Epstein (2020)
- Love & Stuff (2020)
- Forever Alone (2020)
- Grant (2020)
- Jeffrey Epstein: Filthy Rich (2020)
- The Innocence Files (2020)
- D. Wade Life Unexpected (2020)
- Wrong Man (2028–2020)
- Who's Next? (2019)
- Heavy: Fury v Schwarz (2019)
- Dads (2019)
- Paris to Pittsburgh (2018)
- Unspeakable Crime: The Killing of Jessica Chambers (2018)
- The Fourth Estate (2018)
- Gone: The Forgotten Women of Ohio (2017)
- From the Ashes (2017)
- Intent to Destroy (2017)
- Killing Richard Glossip (2017)
- Five Came Back (2017)
- Independent Lens (2017)
- America Divided (2016)
- Parole Board: Victims Speak (2016)
- We Are X (2016)
- Lidia Celebrates America (2015)

== Awards and nominations ==
Year	Result	Award	Category	Work	Ref.
2012	Nominated	South by Southwest	Documentary Feature	Welcome to the Machine	
