= Cinemania =

Cinemania may refer to:

- Cinemania (film festival), a French-language film festival that takes place in Montreal
- Cinemania (film), a 2002 German/US documentary about five obsessed cinemaphiles
- Microsoft Cinemania, a film database released annually by Microsoft between 1992 and 1997
- Cinemanía, a Spanish language monthly film magazine based in Madrid
- A film block that was shown on HBO from 1988-1993.
