= We Are X =

2016 documentary film about the Japanese rock band X Japan

- Theatrical release poster
- Directed by: Stephen Kijak
- Produced by: Jonathan McHugh; Jonathan Platt; John Battsek; Diane Becker
- Starring: Yoshiki; Toshi; Pata; Heath; Sugizo; hide; Taiji
- Cinematography: Sean Kirby; John Maringouin
- Edited by: Mako Kamitsuna; John Maringouin
- Music by: X Japan
- Production company: Passion Pictures
- Distributed by: Drafthouse Films (US)
- Release dates: January 23, 2016 (Sundance); October 21, 2016 (US)
- Running time: 101 minutes
- Countries: United Kingdom; United States; Japan
- Languages: English; Japanese
- Box office: $3,124,876 (worldwide)

We Are X is a 2016 documentary film about the Japanese rock band X Japan and its co-founder, drummer, pianist and leader Yoshiki. Directed by Stephen Kijak, it premiered at the 2016 Sundance Film Festival on January 23. The film covers the history of the band, their influence on Japanese music and society, the band's break up in 1997 and reunion in 2007, and their attempts to achieve success overseas. It also covers Yoshiki's childhood with the X Japan's vocalist Toshi, the suicide of Yoshiki's father when Yoshiki was ten years old, the deaths of two members of the band (guitarist hide and former bassist Taiji), and Yoshiki's various health problems.

The film contains interviews with all the current members of the band (Yoshiki, Toshi, guitarists Pata and Sugizo, and bassist Heath), plus interviews and contributions from Western musicians such as Gene Simmons (Kiss), Marilyn Manson, Wes Borland (Limp Bizkit), Richard Fortus (Guns N' Roses), Marc Benioff and George Martin (producer for The Beatles); famous fans such as comic book author Stan Lee; and Japanese musicians influenced by X Japan including Mucc, Ladies Room, Luna Sea, Dir En Grey and Glay.

We Are X received praise from some critics for being uplifting and dealing with difficult topics such as the role of pain in making music, while others criticized the film for focusing too much attention on Yoshiki rather than the band as a whole. The film won the Sundance Film Festival Award for Best Editing in the World Cinema Documentary Competition and South by Southwest's Audience Award for Excellence in Title Design. The film's soundtrack peaked at the UK Rock & Metal Albums Chart and became the first X Japan album to enter the main UK Albums Chart.

== Plot summary ==
X Japan's story is told through the life of Yoshiki, the band's frontman, drummer, pianist, and composer, leading up to the band's performance at Madison Square Garden on October 11, 2014. It follows his childhood friendship with vocalist Toshi, whom he first met at the age of four. As a child, Yoshiki was given musical instruments as presents, which resulted in his learning to play piano and developing an interest in classical music. When Yoshiki was 10, his father committed suicide. Following this, Yoshiki's mother gave him a drum kit that allowed him to channel his frustration musically, which in turn led him to pursue a path into rock music. As an adult, he and Toshi moved to Tokyo and formed the band X Japan, which also resulted in the development of visual kei, a fashion and music movement featuring elaborate hair styles and flamboyant costumes. The film then details the band's problems, such as the sacking of original bassist Taiji from the group, and Yoshiki's health problems, including the requirement to wear a neck brace while drumming and asthma so severe that oxygen tanks were kept backstage for him.

In 1997, Toshi was "brainwashed" by a cult called "Home of Heart", leading to the group's breakup that year; guitarist hide died five months later in a reported suicide, though the band believe he died accidentally, trying to do a neck-stretching exercise while drunk. The film then looks at Yoshiki following the band's split, where he returned to classical music and composed a piece in honour of the 10th anniversary of the reign of the Emperor Akihito, then the band's reunion in 2007, Taiji's suicide in 2011 eleven months after performing with the group for the first time in 18 years after being arrested in an air rage incident, and their continuing attempts to achieve worldwide success.

Throughout the documentary are interviews with the current band members, family members such as Yoshiki's mother, people who worked closely with the band, and other figures from the world of music and entertainment. These include Stan Lee, who co-created a comic book with Yoshiki entitled Blood Red Dragon; western musicians such as Gene Simmons, Wes Borland, Richard Fortus, Marilyn Manson and George Martin; and Japanese bands influenced by X Japan including Mucc, Ladies Room, Luna Sea, Dir En Grey and Glay.

== Production ==
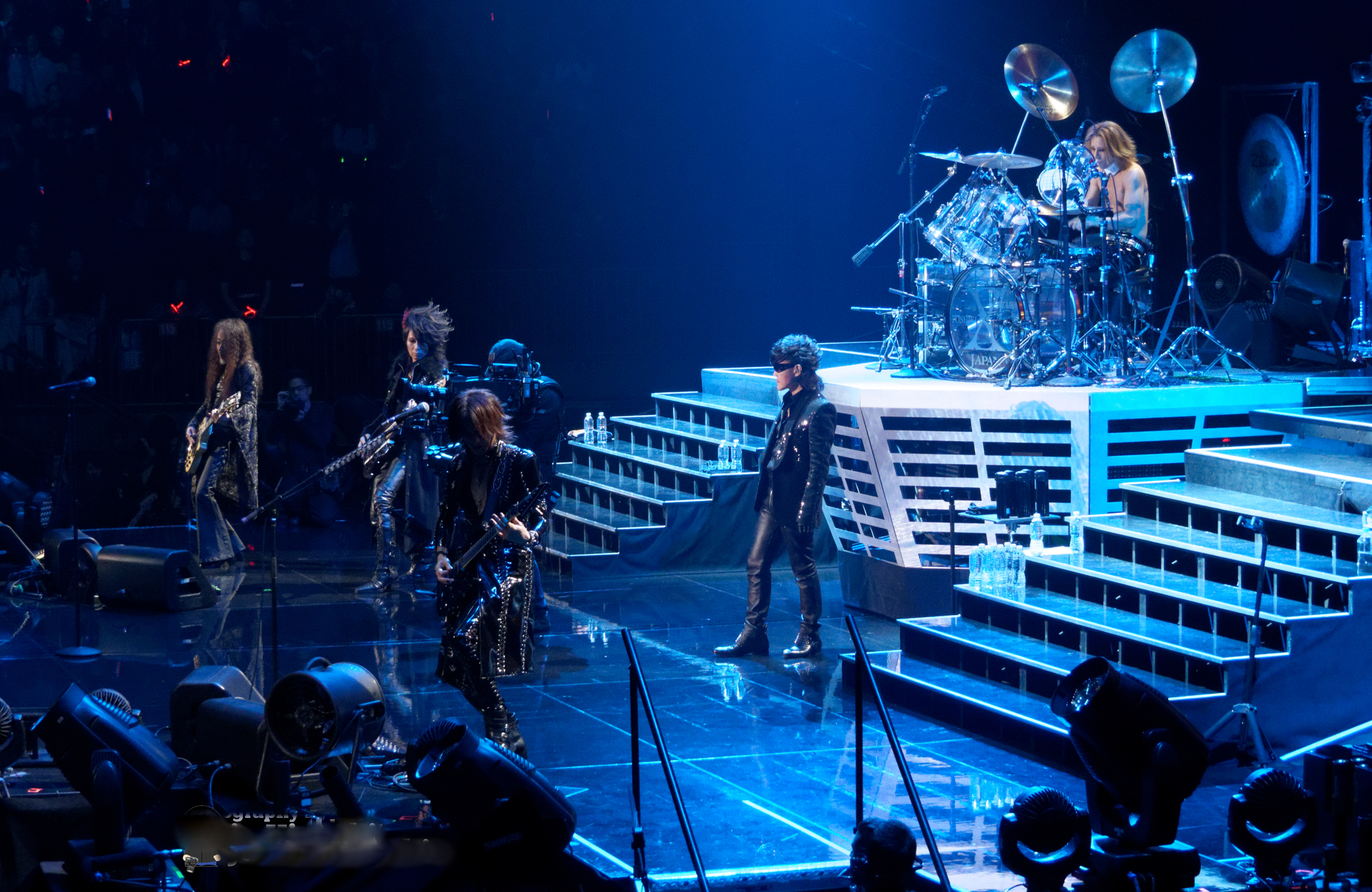
X Japan at Madison Square Garden in 2014. This show served as the framework of the documentary

The film's name comes from the call and response performed by X Japan with the audience during live performances of their self-titled song "X". Numerous times during a pause in the song a band member, usually Toshi, will yell "We are..." and the audience responds with "X!" before the musicians start the last leg of the song.

Yoshiki was convinced to do the film by his agent, Marc Geiger of William Morris Endeavor, and according to director Stephen Kijak, had given the film crew a completely free hand. Kijak said he had never heard of X Japan before getting a call from his producer to make the documentary. But upon learning the band's slogan of "Psychedelic Violence Crime of Visual Shock" he wanted to be a part of it.

Despite not having listened to heavy metal since age 13 or 14 in favor of new wave, Kijak was immediately drawn to the band's music, surprised he had never heard it before. He bonded with some of the band members; learning that Kiss' Love Gun was the first album he, Yoshiki and Toshi had ever bought and talking with Sugizo about the British new wave band Japan and its bassist Mick Karn, who was a friend of the guitarist.

Principal photography began on October 11, 2014 at X Japan's concert at Madison Square Garden. The documentary was announced on July 5, 2015. The director said that because Yoshiki had been documenting his life and X Japan for decades, the team had a lot of archival footage to dig through and use. One such example is footage of David Lynch directing unreleased videos for the song "Longing", which Kijak included as Lynch is one of his biggest influences.

Kijak revealed that upon thinking of Lynch's use of doppelgängers he was reminded of an interview where Yoshiki said he has two personalities, his public persona and a man wounded by the tragedies in his life. He made this the subtext of the film to have something deeper than the average rockumentary. He said one of the hardest aspects was editorial, trying to balance all the characters, albums and drama with Yoshiki's life and work.

Kijak, who is known for music documentaries such as Stones in Exile and Backstreet Boys: Show 'Em What You're Made Of, said in February 2015 that: "I might have to quit music films after this one. The story is so unreal, I don't know where else I could go after this."

=== Title design ===
The titles were awarded Excellence in Title Design at South by Southwest. They were made by Allison and Anthony Brownmoore of Blue Spill production studio. Kijak's requirement was to "blow people off their seats". According to Anthony Brownmoore, the project was a challenge, since he "was very taken by their [the band's] look but that can also be quite daunting. To try to make something and be creative with something that's already so mad and so creative". They worked on the title design for months, syncing it to the song "Jade" the way that the images would pulsate to Yoshiki's drum beats. When creating the background sequences, they used the band's slogan, Psychedelic Violence Crime of Visual Shock as an inspiration. They used old photos of the band members, pairing them up with pulsating, moving, otherworldly backgrounds, for example they filmed floating fluorescent paint in a fish tank with a GoPro camera. The scene where Toshi appears to be standing on top of a waterfall, was filmed in the couple's own kitchen sink with running tap water, while the camera emerging from the water to show the waterfall was actually filmed in Greece. Adobe After Effects and Smoke was used during the production.

== Release ==
=== Theatrical run and box office ===
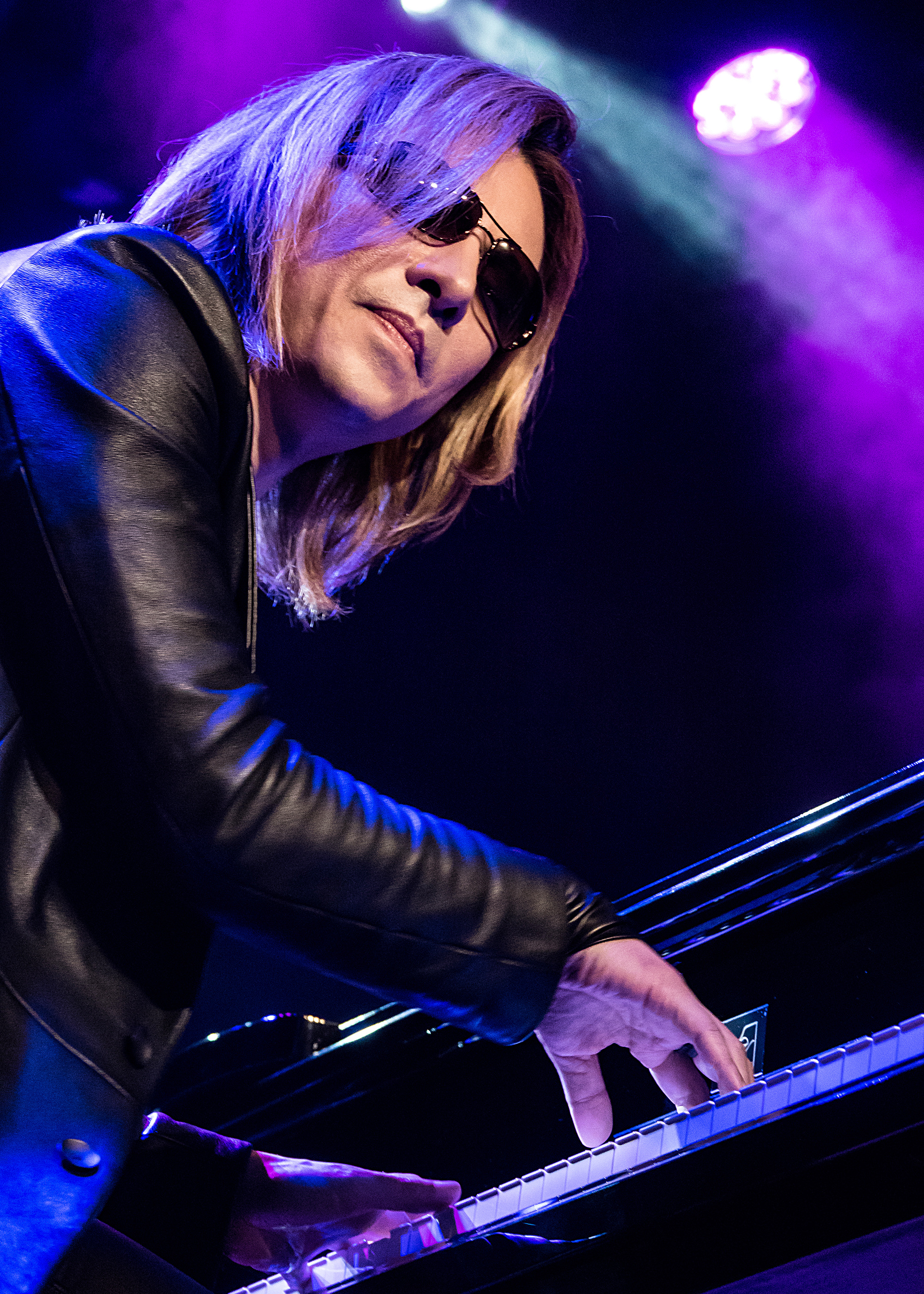
Yoshiki performs during the Q&A panel in San Francisco

We Are X premiered at the Prospector Square Theater on January 23, 2016 as part of the 2016 Sundance Film Festival. Yoshiki and the film team attended the red carpet beforehand and held a Q&A panel after its screening. The film had several other screenings throughout Park City, Utah that week. It was also shown at the 2016 South by Southwest festival. The film was licensed for distribution in the United States by Drafthouse Films. It had its US premiere on October 21, 2016 at the Nuart Theatre in Los Angeles. Yoshiki and Kijak appeared for the screening and a Q&A. At the box office, the film made $45,270 in the US and Canada, and $3,124,876 worldwide.

The film was scheduled to have its world premiere at the Wembley Arena in London on March 12, 2016. X Japan was to perform at the venue that same day with the event being called "X Day." However, due to Pata being diagnosed with life-threatening diverticulitis and a severe blood clot in his portal vein the concert was postponed for almost a year, taking place on March 4, 2017. The film instead made its UK premiere on February 28, 2017 at Picturehouse Cinemas in London, before being released nationwide on March 2. The film was later screened at the postponed Wembley Arena concert on March 4, 2017.

Yoshiki toured Europe in October 2017, to promote theatrical releases in different countries. The events included screenings and a Q&A session.

=== Critical reception ===
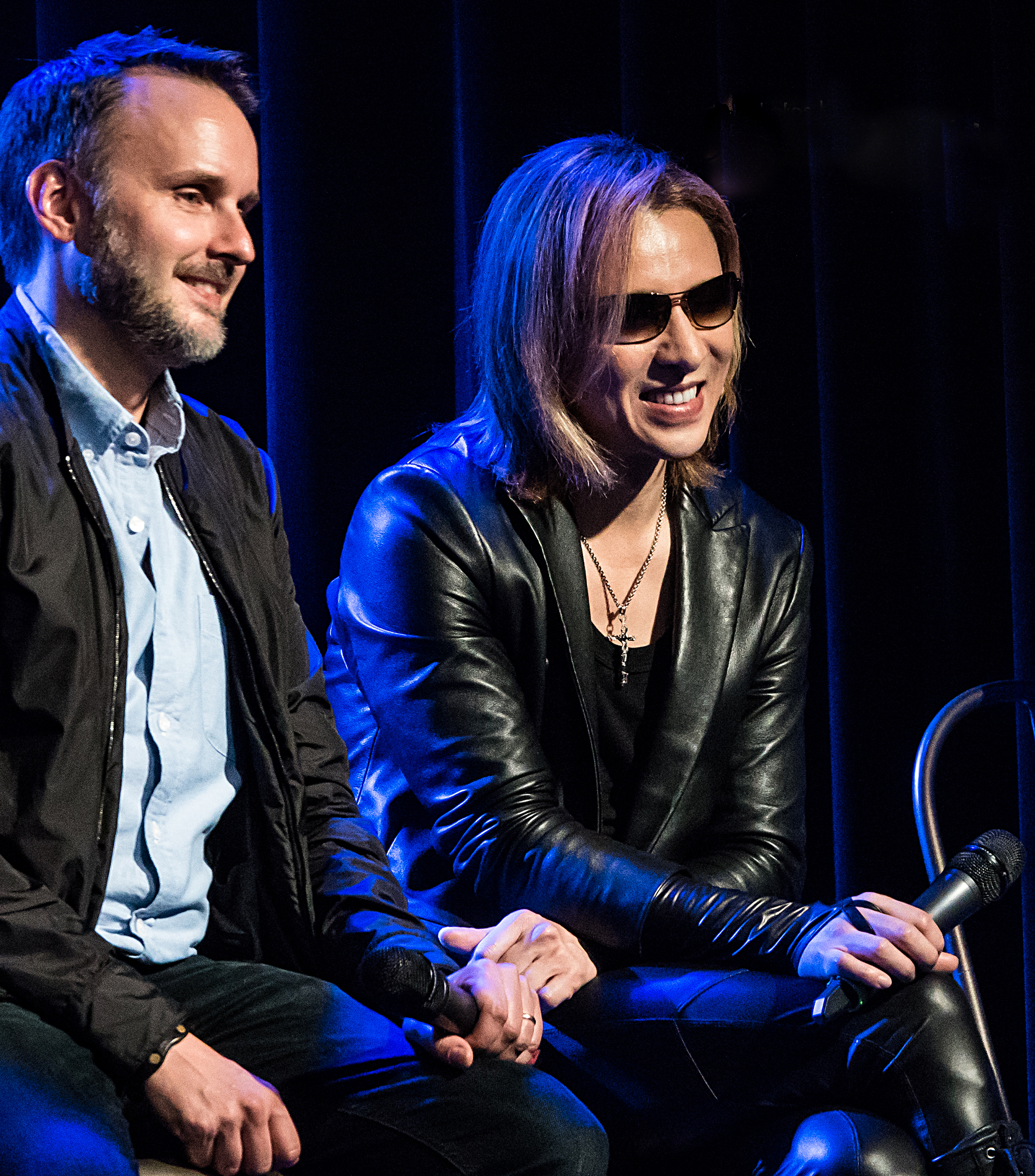
Stephen Kijak and Yoshiki at a 2016 Q&A panel for the film in San Francisco.

The review aggregator website Rotten Tomatoes reported a 78% approval rating with an average score of 6.4/10, based on 23 reviews. Metacritic gave the film a rating of 64 out of 100 based on 10 reviews, describing the reviews as "generally favorable".

Positive comments mentioned the movie's uplifting nature, with Paula Mejia of Newsweek writing that it "forces us to grapple with difficult questions of purpose, the inevitable role of pain in art, and how music acts as a force for salvation, as much for the fans as for the musicians who thrash these songs into existence". Andy Webster of The New York Times wrote that We Are X was, "fascinating and assured documentary", but also mentioned what he thought was an unfair R-rating saying: "We Are X is rated R (Under 17 requires accompanying parent or adult guardian) for — what? Shredding?"

Criticism centered on the documentary's focus on Yoshiki rather than on the band as a whole. John DeFore of The Hollywood Reporter said that while the film does cover the deaths of two X Japan members and the "brainwashing" of Toshi, it spends more time following the drummer at press and preparations for Madison Square Garden. Josiah Hughes of Exclaim! made similar comments and noted typos in the English subtitles. Hughes gave the film an 8 out of 10 and observed that these were small complaints against an otherwise "outstanding rock documentary." The movie was given ratings of 3 stars out of 5 by reviews in The Guardian, the New York Daily News and Time Out London with views range from the film being: "A watchable and interesting – if a tad worshipful", "an accessible ride, if not a particularly unique one", and that, "Kijak’s willingness to indulge the band’s rampant self-mythologising can get tiresome". The Village Voice was more critical saying it was, "a maddeningly vague primer. ... All director Stephen Kijak's frustrated attempts at getting into Yoshiki's head leave little time for viewers to hear much of what X Japan's music actually sounds like."

=== Accolades and recognitions ===
We Are X was entered in Sundance's World Cinema Documentary Competition, winning the Special Jury Award for Best Editing. It also won the Audience Award for Excellence in Title Design at South by Southwest. We Are X was nominated for the Golden Goblet award for Best Documentary at the 2016 Shanghai International Film Festival. It was also nominated for the inaugural Best Music Documentary award at the 22nd Critics' Choice Awards. On December 13, 2016, it was announced that the film's ending theme song "La Venus" was one of 91 songs in contention for nomination for the Academy Award for Best Original Song at the 89th Academy Awards. The January 2018 issue of Neo named We Are X the "Best Asian Movie" in their annual awards. In March 2018, the film won the "Best Music Film" award at the Space Shower Music Awards in Japan.

Yahoo! Music named it number 4 on their list of the 10 Best Music Documentaries of 2016. When the film was released in the UK, We Are X reached number 2 in the Official Charts Company's Music Video chart, and the Blu-Ray SteelBook version of the film reached number 50 in the Blu-Ray chart in the first week of its release.

=== Home media ===
The film's home video rights were acquired by Magnolia Home Entertainment, who released it on Blu-ray, DVD and Digital HD in the US on April 25, 2017. In the UK, the rights to the film were picked up by Manga Entertainment, who released the film on Blu-Ray SteelBook with cover art by Becky Cloonan, and DVD on May 22, 2017. The release's extras are an eight-page booklet; deleted scenes featuring an interview with Yuko Yamaguchi the creator of a Yoshiki-themed Hello Kitty doll named "Yoshikitty", footage of Yoshiki attending Hello Kitty Con, Yoshiki appearing at the New Economy Summit, and Yoshiki revisiting his hometown of Tateyama, Chiba; extended interviews with X Japan's current band members; a series of promotional video interviews with Yoshiki discussing the film; video performances of the songs "Kurenai" and "Forever Love" from The Last Live concert; and a fan video of the song "Born to Be Free".

Francis Rizzo III from DVD Talk commented on the quality of the release saying that visually it is of mixed quality, but he also added that: "Black levels are solid, and there are no issues with digital distractions (other than those inherent in the archival footage)", and praised the 5.1 DTS-HD Master Audio track.

== Soundtrack ==
The soundtrack to We Are X was released on March 3, 2017. In the first week of the release of the album it reached number 4 in Japan's Oricon Albums Chart. It also reached number 1 in the UK Rock & Metal Albums Chart, number 3 in the UK Soundtrack Albums Chart and number 27 in the main UK Albums Chart, making it X Japan's first appearance on the UK chart.

== See also ==
- Yoshiki: Under the Sky
