= Stephen Kijak =

American filmmaker

- Born: 3 October 1969 (age 56); New Bedford, Massachusetts, U.S.
- Education: Boston University
- Occupations: Film director; producer
- Years active: 1996–present
- Website: http://www.stephenkijak.com

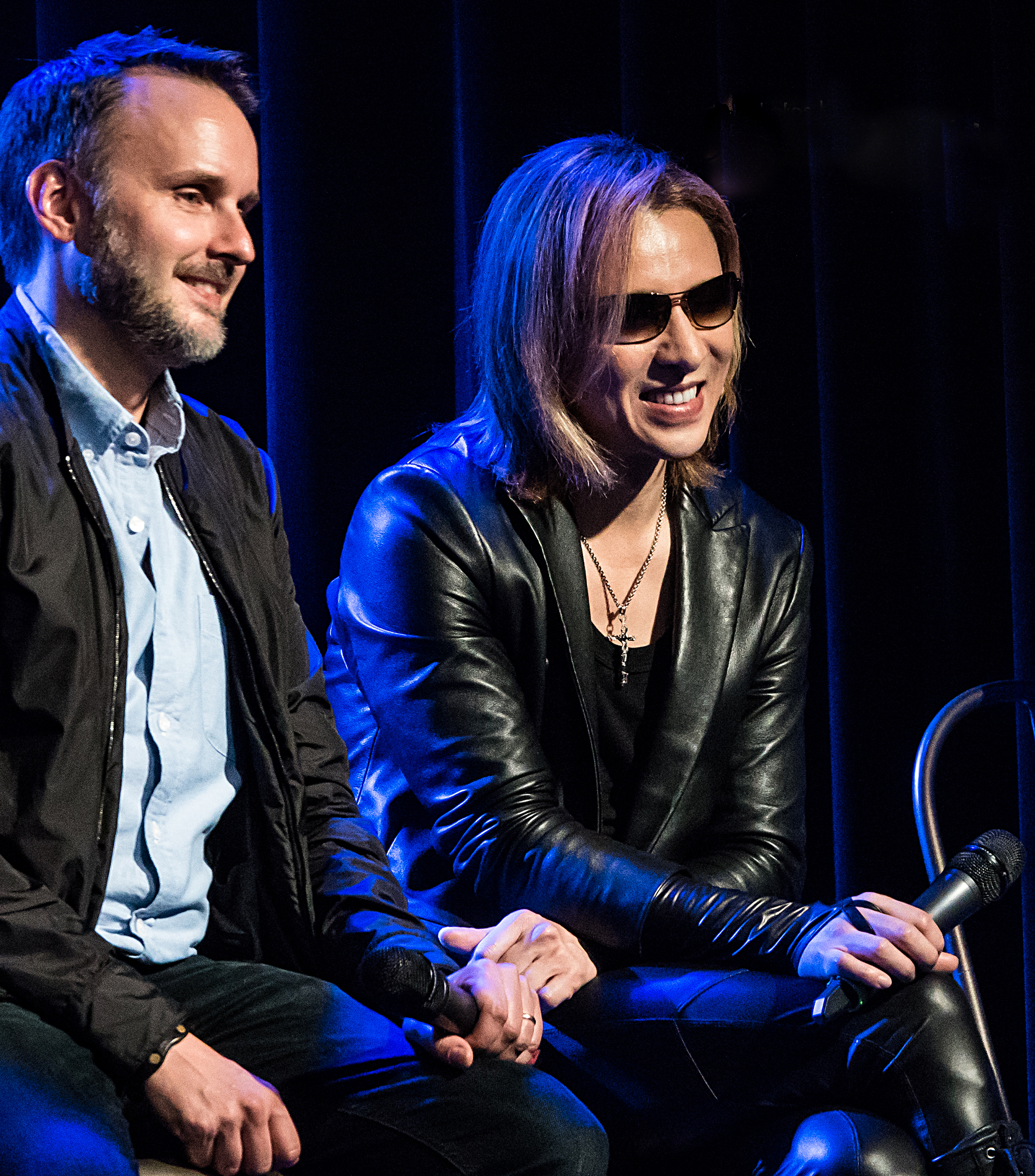
Stephen Kijak with Yoshiki in 2016

Stephen Kijak (/ˈkaɪæk/; born 3 October 1969) is an American film director. He is known for films about music and musicians, most notably the feature documentaries Scott Walker – 30 Century Man (2006), Stones in Exile (2010), We Are X (2016), If I Leave Here Tomorrow (2018), and Sid & Judy (2019). His collaborators and subjects include such musical legends and icons as David Bowie, Scott Walker, The Rolling Stones, Jaco Pastorius, Rob Trujillo, Backstreet Boys, X Japan, Lynyrd Skynyrd, Judy Garland, and The Smiths.

== Career ==
Kijak studied with the film scholar and John Cassavetes expert Ray Carney, as well as the late Mel Howard at Boston University's College of Communication. He wrote, directed and produced his debut feature film Never Met Picasso (1996) which starred Margot Kidder, Alexis Arquette and Don McKellar (with music by Kristin Hersh). It won awards for both Best Screenplay and Best Actor (for Arquette) at the 1997 Outfest film festival. He went on to make the documentary Cinemania (2002), a look at New York City’s manic-obsessive film buffs in collaboration with German film director Angela Christlieb. The film was shown at over 25 film festivals worldwide including Locarno International Film Festival, International Film Festival Rotterdam, Edinburgh International Film Festival, SXSW, Tribeca Film Festival, Melbourne International Film Festival, Seattle International Film Festival, Sheffield Documentary Festival, and the Hamptons International Film Festival where it won the Golden Starfish Jury Award for Best Documentary. Cinemania grew out of a short film Kijak made called Movie Madness: The Passion of Jack Angstreich for John Pierson's show Split Screen that ran on IFC.

His next film was a documentary on musician Scott Walker. The film, titled Scott Walker - 30 Century Man was executive produced by David Bowie, and featured Radiohead, Brian Eno, Sting, Damon Albarn and Jarvis Cocker, and provided a look inside Scott Walker’s creative process over a 40-year career as Walker was completing work on his first album in a decade, The Drift. The film had its world premiere on October 31, 2006, at the 50th London Film Festival, and premiered internationally at the 2007 Berlin International Film Festival and became one of the most critically acclaimed documentaries released in the UK that year.

Stones in Exile, a film he directed that was commissioned by The Rolling Stones to tell the story of the making of their 1972 album Exile on Main St., had its world premiere at the 2010 Directors' Fortnight in Cannes, followed by broadcast premieres on BBC 1's Imagine, and on a special edition of Late Night with Jimmy Fallon on NBC. The film would be the first of five of Kijak's films to be produced by two-time Academy Award-winning producer John Battsek for his company Passion Pictures.

In 2012, he teamed with Passion Pictures again and Rob Trujillo from Metallica (making his debut as a film producer) on a feature documentary about the musician Jaco Pastorius.

On February 11, 2013, The Hollywood Reporter announced that Kijak would be directing a feature documentary about the biggest-selling boy band of all time, The Backstreet Boys. The film, titled Backstreet Boys: Show 'Em What You're Made Of was produced by Mia Bays (who produced Kijak's Scott Walker film) and Pulse Films.

We Are X, a documentary on the heavy metal band X Japan and its leader Yoshiki, was premiered in the World Documentary Competition at the 2016 Sundance Film Festival. Kijak remarked about the film "I might have to quit music films after this one. The story is so unreal, I don't know where else I could go after this." The film was awarded the Special Jury Award for Editing. It then went on to play at SXSW where it won an Audience Award for Excellence in Title Design. It has continued to screen at festivals around the world, including Seattle International Film Festival, BEAT Festival in Moscow, and the Shanghai International Film Festival. It was released theatrically in the US by Drafthouse Films, a division of Alamo Drafthouse Cinema and has been released internationally.

On March 13, 2018, Kijak's documentary If I Leave Here Tomorrow: A Film About Lynyrd Skynyrd had its world premiere at the SXSW Film Festival, prior to its US broadcast debut on Showtime on August 18, 2018. Another Showtime documentary followed in 2019: Sid & Judy, about the life of Judy Garland, framed by the story of her marriage to her third husband Sidney Luft.

Kijak's next project was acting as showrunner of the 4-part docu-drama series Equal (2020) for HBO Max. Produced by Scout Productions, Greg Berlanti, and Jim Parson's That's Wonderful Productions, Equal tells the stories of the LGBTQ rights movement in the years leading up to the 1969 Stonewall Uprising and the first Pride marches. He directed three of the series' four episodes, with filmmaker Kimberly Reed directing one.

His return to narrative filmmaking, Shoplifters of the World, based entirely around the music of The Smiths, was released in March 2021 by RLJ Entertainment and received its first major public screening at the SeeYouSound Film Festival in Turin, Italy in February 2022 as part of a retrospective dedicated to Kijak's music films.

On November 6, 2020 The Hollywood Reporter announced that Kijak's next film would be a documentary about American actor Rock Hudson. Produced by Altitude Films and Dogstar Films for HBO Documentary Films, Rock Hudson: All That Heaven Allowed premiered at the 2023 Tribeca Film Festival before its broadcast premiere on HBO.

== Filmography ==
- Never Met Picasso (1996)
- Cinemania (2002)
- Scott Walker: 30 Century Man (2006)
- Stones in Exile (2010)
- Jaco (2014)
- Backstreet Boys: Show 'Em What You're Made Of (2015)
- We Are X (2016)
- If I Leave Here Tomorrow: A Film About Lynyrd Skynyrd (2018)
- Sid & Judy (2019)
- Equal (2020)
- Shoplifters of the World (2021)
- Rock Hudson: All That Heaven Allowed (2023)
