= Rock Hudson: All That Heaven Allowed =

- Directed by: Stephen Kijak
- Starring: Rock Hudson
- Edited by: Claire Didier
- Music by: Laura Karpman
- Production companies: HBO Documentary Films; Altitude Film Entertainment
- Distributed by: HBO Documentary Films
- Release date: June 11, 2023 (Tribeca Festival)
- Running time: 104 minutes
- Countries: United Kingdom; New Zealand; United States
- Language: English

Rock Hudson: All That Heaven Allowed is a 2023 documentary film about the life of actor Rock Hudson. It was directed by Stephen Kijak. An original production of HBO Documentary Films, the film had its world premiere on June 11, 2023, as part of the Tribeca Festival. It debuted on HBO on June 28, 2023.

== Reception ==
On the review aggregator website Rotten Tomatoes, 92% of 48 critics' reviews are positive, with an average rating of 7.4/10. The website's consensus reads: "If it presents an incomplete picture of the actor's life and legacy, Rock Hudson: All That Heaven Allowed remains an absorbing and poignant glimpse of Hollywood history." Metacritic, which uses a weighted average, assigned the film a score of 71 out of 100, based on 16 critics, indicating "generally favorable" reviews.

The Hollywood Reporter called the film "An illuminating account of a beloved Hollywood icon's dual life" and the Los Angeles Times called it "a vital piece of Hollywood history." Rex Reed of The Observer wrote, "This funny, sad, meticulously researched and painstakingly detailed documentary is unmistakably real and inescapably touching."

=== Accolades ===
The film received a nomination for Outstanding Documentary at the 35th GLAAD Media Awards.
