= Jennifer Jason Leigh =

American actress (born 1962)

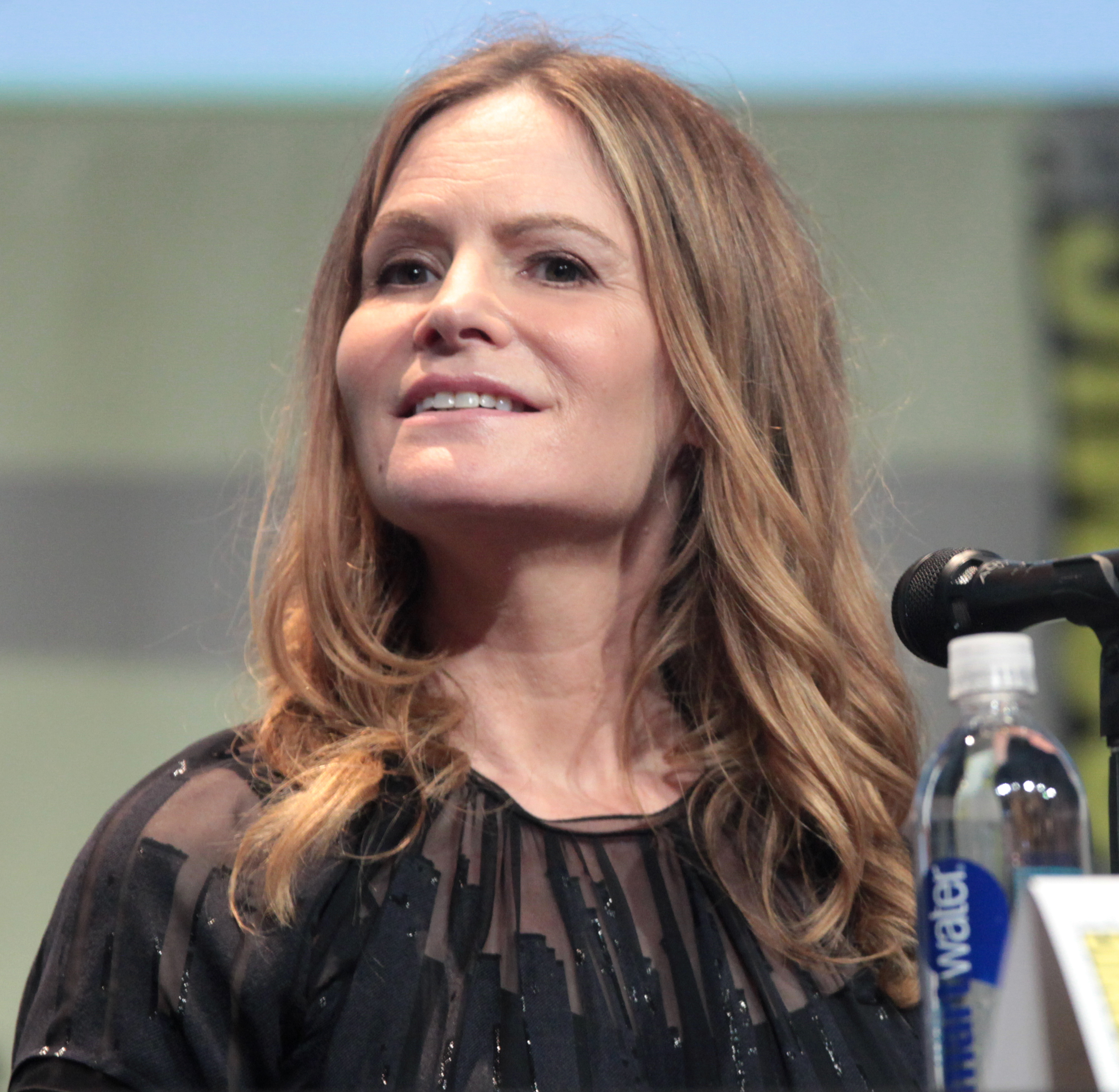
- Leigh in 2015
- Born: Jennifer Leigh Morrow; February 5, 1962 (age 64); Los Angeles, California, U.S.
- Occupation: Actress
- Years active: 1976–present
- Spouse: Noah Baumbach (m. 2005; div. 2013)
- Children: 1
- Parents: Vic Morrow (father); Barbara Turner (mother)

Jennifer Jason Leigh (born Jennifer Leigh Morrow; February 5, 1962) is an American actress. She began her career on television during the 1970s before making her film breakthrough in the teen film Fast Times at Ridgemont High (1982). She received critical praise for her performances in Last Exit to Brooklyn (1989), Miami Blues (1990), Backdraft (1991), Single White Female (1992), and The Hudsucker Proxy (1994), and was nominated for a Golden Globe Award for her portrayal of Dorothy Parker in Mrs. Parker and the Vicious Circle (1994). For her role as fugitive Daisy Domergue in The Hateful Eight (2015), she was nominated for the Golden Globe and Academy Award for Best Supporting Actress.

Leigh starred in a 1995 film written by her mother, screenwriter Barbara Turner, entitled Georgia. She co-wrote and co-directed a film with Alan Cumming titled The Anniversary Party (2001). Leigh starred in the crime drama Road to Perdition (2002) and the family drama Margot at the Wedding (2007). She had a recurring role on the Showtime comedy-drama series Weeds (2009–2012) and received critical acclaim for her voice work in Charlie Kaufman's Anomalisa (2015). From 2017 to 2021, she starred in the Netflix comedy-drama series Atypical, while featuring in the science fiction films Annihilation (2018) and Possessor (2020). She has since starred in the fifth season of the crime drama series Fargo (2023).

For her stage work, Leigh was nominated for a Drama Desk award for her off-Broadway performance as Beverly Moss in Mike Leigh's Abigail's Party. Her Broadway debut occurred in 1998, when she became the replacement for the role of Sally Bowles in the musical Cabaret.

== Early life ==
Leigh was born on February 5, 1962 in Los Angeles, California. Her father, Vic Morrow (born Victor Morozoff), was an actor, and her mother, Barbara Turner, was a screenwriter. Her parents divorced when she was two. Leigh's birth name was Jennifer Leigh Morrow but she decided to change her surname early in her acting career, taking the masculine middle name "Jason" in honor of actor Jason Robards, a family friend. Leigh's parents were both Jewish; her father's family was from Russia and her mother's family was from Austria.

Leigh is the younger of two daughters. Her older sister, Carrie Ann Morrow, who was credited as a "technical advisor" on her 1995 film Georgia, died in 2016. Leigh also has a half-sister, actress Mina Badie. Badie acted alongside Leigh in The Anniversary Party. Film director Reza Badiyi became Leigh's stepfather when he married Leigh's mother.

== Career ==
=== 1976–1989 ===
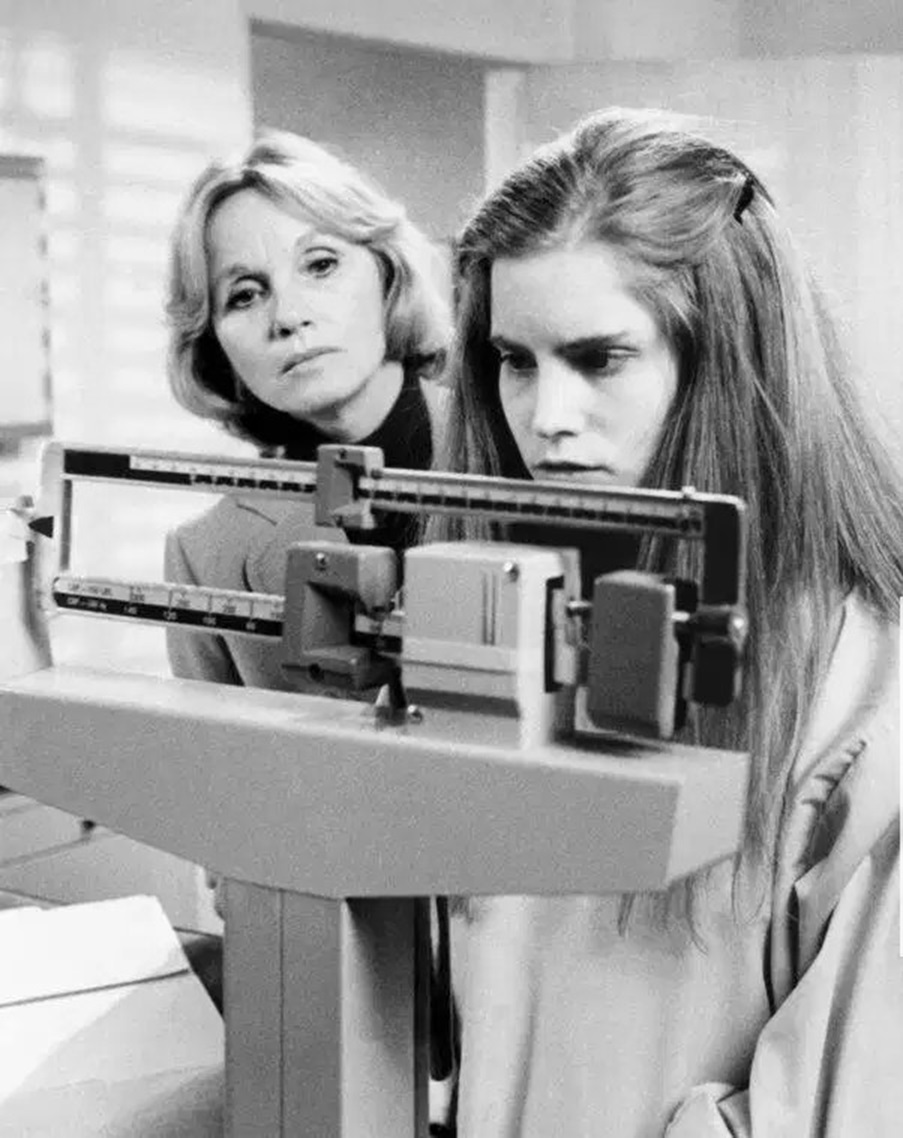
Leigh with Eva Marie Saint in The Best Little Girl in the World (1981)

Leigh had a nonspeaking role in her film debut Death of a Stranger (The Execution) (1973). At the age of 14, she attended acting workshops, taught by Lee Strasberg, and the Stagedoor Manor Performing Arts Training Center in Loch Sheldrake, New York. Afterwards, she landed a role in the film The Young Runaways (1978). She also appeared in an episode of Baretta and an episode of The Waltons. Several television films followed, including a portrayal of an anorexic teenager in The Best Little Girl in the World, for which Leigh dropped to 86 pounds (39 kg). She made her film debut, as a blind, deaf and mute rape victim in the 1981 slasher film Eyes of a Stranger. She left school to star in the film.

In 1982, Leigh played the role of Stacy Hamilton in Amy Heckerling's high school film Fast Times at Ridgemont High, which served as a launching pad for several of its young stars. While decrying the writing as sexist and exploitative, film critic Roger Ebert was enthusiastic about the acting, singling out Leigh and writing, "Don't they know they have a star on their hands?" With the exception of Ridgemont High and a supporting role in the comedy film Easy Money (1983) alongside Rodney Dangerfield, Leigh's early film work consisted of playing fragile, damaged or neurotic characters in low-budget horror or thriller films. She played a virginal princess kidnapped and raped by mercenaries in Flesh and Blood (1985), an innocent waitress pursued by the psychopathic title character in The Hitcher (1986) (both films pitting her alongside Rutger Hauer), a mentally disturbed, child-like young woman on the threshold of sexual awakening in the Southern Gothic film Sister, Sister (1987), and a young woman on the verge of a nervous breakdown in Heart of Midnight (1989).

She was selected as one of "America's 10 Most Beautiful Women" by Harper's Bazaar in 1989.

=== 1990s ===
In 1990, Leigh made a significant career breakthrough when she was awarded New York Film Critics Circle Award for Best Supporting Actress and the Boston Society of Film Critics Award for Best Supporting Actress for her portrayals of two very different prostitutes: the tough streetwalker Tralala who is brutally gang-raped in Last Exit to Brooklyn, and Susie, a 23-year-old prostitute who falls in love with ex-con Alec Baldwin in Miami Blues. Roger Ebert included Last Exit in his list of Best Movies of 1990, calling Leigh's performance brave, though his review of Miami Blues was much less sympathetic, simultaneously criticizing Leigh's ability to play dumb roles and praising her ability to play smart roles. Entertainment Weekly called her "the Meryl Streep of bimbos".

In his 1991 book Cult Movie Stars, Danny Peary described Leigh as "an interesting, always watchable, and extremely talented young actress," summarizing her appeal "For those who believe that the preacher's angelic-looking daughter is as interested in sex as the farmer's daughter. This pretty, sweet-looking blonde has played a number of shy and innocent-looking women who are curious about sex; once they learn, they display wicked imaginations." Peary added, "Leigh seems too gentle and looks too young and innocent to play the parts she has taken. Her females are either hungry for sex and/or have been psychologically affected by past sexual incidents... Her characters are vulnerable and almost always victimised, but usually they gave surprising resilience, and try to use their bad experiences to make themselves stronger."

Leigh was cast in her first mainstream Hollywood studio film, the firefighter drama Backdraft (1991), in which she played a more conventional role, the girlfriend of lead actor William Baldwin. She found more success in the gritty crime drama Rush (1991), portraying an undercover cop who becomes a junkie and falls in love with her partner, played by Jason Patric. Reviewing Rush, Roger Ebert noted, "Leigh of course is a veteran by now of grubby characters in sleazy films; she has become one of the best young actresses by accepting roles some of her contemporaries would not even consider... After her extraordinary work as a doomed prostitute in Last Exit to Brooklyn, here she is again, looking sweet and wholesome, and descending into a world of people who have forgotten their better natures." Leigh's next film, Single White Female (1992), was a surprise box-office success, bringing Leigh to her largest mainstream audience yet, portraying a mentally ill woman who terrorizes roommate Bridget Fonda.

Leigh was awarded the MTV Movie Award for Best Villain at the 1993 MTV Movie Awards and nominated for Chicago Film Critics Association Award for Best Actress. Leigh co-starred with Kathy Bates as a tormented, pill-popping woman hiding a history of childhood sexual abuse in the adaptation of Stephen King's novel Dolores Claiborne (1995). Leigh achieved her greatest acclaim in the role of Sadie Flood, an angry, drug-addicted rock singer living in the shadow of her successful older sister (Mare Winningham), in Georgia (1995). For the role, Leigh dropped to 90 pounds (41 kg) and sang all of her songs live, including a rambling 8 1/2-minute version of Van Morrison's "Take Me Back". Georgia was met with critical praise. James Berardinelli wrote, "There are times when it's uncomfortable to watch this performance because it's so powerful", and Janet Maslin of The New York Times described Leigh's "fierce, risk-taking performance and flashes of overwhelming honesty".

Leigh won New York Film Critics Circle Award for Best Actress and Best Actress from the Montreal World Film Festival, as well as an Independent Spirit Award nomination. Some critics and commentators expressed surprise that she was not nominated for an Academy Award.

Throughout the 1990s, Leigh worked with many independent film directors. She worked with Robert Altman in Short Cuts (1993), playing a phone-sex operator, and Kansas City (1996), as a streetwise kidnapper. Leigh has expressed admiration for Altman and called him her mentor. In a change of pace from her "bad girl" roles, Leigh played the fast-talking reporter Amy Archer in the Coen Brothers' comic homage to 1950s comedy, The Hudsucker Proxy (1994). Leigh took her first lead role as the writer and critic Dorothy Parker in Alan Rudolph's film Mrs. Parker and the Vicious Circle (1994). She received a Golden Globe Award nomination and a National Society of Film Critics Award for Best Actress, as well as Chicago Film Critics Association Award for Best Actress and Fort Lauderdale Film Critics Best Actress Award.

In another change of pace, she starred in Agnieszka Holland's version of the Henry James novel Washington Square (1997), as a mousy 19th-century heiress courted by a gold digger. In 1997, she was featured in Faith No More's music video for "Last Cup of Sorrow". In 1998, she appeared alongside Campbell Scott in the Hallmark Hall of Fame television film The Love Letter. In David Cronenberg's eXistenZ (1999), she played a virtual-reality game designer who becomes lost in her own creation. Leigh filmed a role in Stanley Kubrick's final film Eyes Wide Shut (1999) as a grieving patient of Dr. Bill Harford (Tom Cruise) who declares her love for him after her father's death. Kubrick wanted to reshoot the scenes, but Leigh was unavailable due to scheduling conflicts with eXistenZ; instead, her scenes were cut, and the role was recast with Marie Richardson.

=== 2000s ===
She served as a jury member at the 57th Venice International Film Festival in 2000. Leigh had a brief role as a gangster's doomed wife in Sam Mendes's Road to Perdition (2002) and co-starred as Meg Ryan's brutally murdered sister in Jane Campion's erotic thriller In the Cut (2003). She went on to play Stevie, the prostitute girlfriend of Christian Bale's character in the dark thriller The Machinist (2004). Mick LaSalle of the San Francisco Chronicle commented that "As the downtrodden, sexy, trusting, and quietly funny prostitute, Leigh is, of course, in her element". Her performance as a manipulative stage mother in Don McKellar's film Childstar won her a Genie Award for Best Performance by an Actress in a Supporting Role in 2005.

After many years of wanting to be in a Todd Solondz film, she appeared in Palindromes (2004). Leigh was originally cast as Vincent Gallo's girlfriend in his self-directed film The Brown Bunny and was apparently prepared to perform oral sex on Gallo as the script required. Leigh subsequently commented that "it just didn't work out" and the role was eventually played by Chloë Sevigny. She also appeared in the psychological thriller The Jacket (2005), alongside Adrien Brody and Keira Knightley. Leigh appeared in the 2008 ensemble film Synecdoche, New York and has acted in two films written and directed by her then-partner Noah Baumbach: Margot at the Wedding, co-starring Nicole Kidman, and Greenberg. Leigh has said that the roles were not specifically written for her, as Baumbach does not write roles with actors in mind. In 2009, Leigh was cast in the Showtime comedy-drama series Weeds, becoming a regular guest in the eighth season.

Leigh has received three separate career tributes: at the Telluride Film Festival in 1993, a special award for her contribution to independent cinema from the Film Society of Lincoln Center in 2002, and a week-long retrospective of her film work held by the American Cinematheque at Los Angeles's Grauman's Egyptian Theatre in 2001.

=== 2010s–present ===
Leigh joined the drama series Revenge on ABC in 2012.

Leigh promoting The Hateful Eight at San Diego Comic-Con in 2015

In 2015, Leigh starred in Quentin Tarantino's western film The Hateful Eight. It is set in Wyoming after the Civil War and was released on December 25. Leigh, along with the rest of the cast, appeared at San Diego Comic-Con to promote the film in July 2015. Leigh's performance has received multiple award nominations at various award ceremonies, including her third Golden Globe nomination for Best Supporting Actress in a Motion Picture, her first BAFTA Award nomination for Best Actress in a Supporting Role and her first Academy Award nomination for Best Supporting Actress.

In 2017, Leigh was reunited with her Hateful Eight co-star Tim Roth when the pair played a husband-and-wife team of contract killers in six episodes of Showtime's revival of David Lynch and Mark Frost's Twin Peaks.

Leigh played psychiatrist Dr. Ventress in the 2018 science fiction film Annihilation, alongside Natalie Portman, directed by Alex Garland and based on the novel by Jeff VanderMeer.

In 2019, Leigh appeared in two episodes of Showtime's last season of The Affair and narrated the audiobook for Quentin Tarantino's novelization of Once Upon a Time in Hollywood. She appeared in Brandon Cronenberg's science fiction thriller Possessor in 2020. In 2022, Leigh was cast in a lead role as Lorraine Lyon in the fifth season of the FX black comedy crime drama anthology series Fargo.

=== Stage roles ===
In 1998, Leigh took on the lead role of Sally Bowles in Sam Mendes's Broadway revival of the musical Cabaret, succeeding Natasha Richardson, who originated the role in Mendes's production. She succeeded Mary-Louise Parker in the lead role in Proof on Broadway in 2001. Her other theatrical appearances include The Glass Menagerie, Man of Destiny, The Shadow Box, Picnic, Sunshine and Abigail's Party. In 2011, she played Bunny in the Broadway revival of The House of Blue Leaves in New York City alongside Ben Stiller and Edie Falco.

=== Writing and directing ===
In 2001, Leigh co-wrote and co-directed The Anniversary Party, an independently produced feature film about a recently reconciled married couple who assemble their friends at their Hollywood Hills house, ostensibly to celebrate their sixth wedding anniversary. As the evening progresses, the party disintegrates into emotional confrontations and bitter arguments as the façade of their happy marriage crumbles. Leigh was inspired by her recent experience filming the low-budget Dogme 95 film The King Is Alive. Leigh and co-writer Alan Cumming drew freely from their personal experiences in the writing of the film. Leigh plays an aging actress who makes jokes about her lack of Academy Award nominations and is fearful of losing her bisexual husband (Cumming). The film was shot in 19 days on digital video, and costarred the pair's real-life Hollywood friends, including Kevin Kline, Phoebe Cates, Gwyneth Paltrow, Jennifer Beals, John C. Reilly, Parker Posey, and Leigh's sister Mina Badie. Leigh and Cumming jointly received a citation for Excellence in Filmmaking from the National Board of Review, and were nominated for the Independent Spirit Award for Best First Feature and Independent Spirit Award for Best First Screenplay. The film received generally positive reviews.

== Political views and activism ==
In 2005, The Guardian characterized Leigh's political views as left-wing and "fiercely anti-Bush". She said, "Bush has gathered this circle, he's made the Christian right so powerful. Or they've made him so powerful, I don't know which comes first. I had no idea there were so many born-agains in this country. I don't understand the place I live any more." In 2015, she said of the candidates for the 2016 United States presidential election, "I really like Bernie, though I didn't love his gun control answer [in the debates]. And there's a lot I like about Hillary. It's kind of a tossup between them. Obviously, Trump is hilarious and a lot of fun to watch, and I really hope he becomes the Republican nominee."

Following the 2023 October 7 attacks on Israel and the subsequent Gaza war, Leigh has heavily voiced support for Israel on Instagram. In 2024 and 2026, Leigh signed open letters written by pro-Israel organization Creative Community for Peace supporting Israel's inclusion in the Eurovision Song Contest. Following Jonathan Glazer's acceptance speech at the 96th Academy Awards for Best International Feature Film, in which he denounced his "Jewishness and the Holocaust being hijacked by an occupation...", Leigh was one of 1,000 Jewish members of the film industry who denounced Glazer's speech and defended the Israeli government's actions in another open letter. In September 2024, Leigh signed an open letter by pro-Israel advocacy groups StopAntisemitism, StandWithUs, End Jew Hatred and 2024 New Voices urging the Biden administration to "protect and support" Israel and secure the release of hostages taken by Hamas in the war.

== Personal life ==
In 1982, Leigh's father, Vic Morrow, was accidentally killed along with child actors Myca Dinh Le and Renée Shin-Yi Chen when a helicopter stunt went wrong during the filming of Twilight Zone: The Movie. Leigh and her sister filed a wrongful death lawsuit against Warner Bros., John Landis, and Steven Spielberg. They settled out of court a year later.

Leigh has described herself as shy, introverted, and averse to Hollywood publicity and scandal. Speaking about her roles in smaller, independent films, she said, "I'd much rather be in a movie that people have really strong feelings about than one that makes a hundred million dollars but you can't remember because it's just like all the others."

She met independent film writer-director Noah Baumbach in 2001 while starring on Broadway in Proof. The couple married on September 2, 2005. Their son was born on March 17, 2010. Leigh filed for divorce on November 15, 2010, in Los Angeles, citing irreconcilable differences. She sought spousal support as well as primary custody of the couple's son, with visitation for Baumbach. The divorce was finalized in September 2013.

== Filmography ==
=== Film ===
Jennifer Jason Leigh's film appearances
Year	Title	Role	Notes/Ref.
1981	Eyes of a Stranger	Tracy Harris	
1982	Wrong Is Right	Young Girl	
1982	Fast Times at Ridgemont High	Stacy Hamilton	
1983	Easy Money	Allison Capuletti	
1984	Grandview, U.S.A.	Candy Webster	
1985	Flesh + Blood	Agnes	
1986	The Hitcher	Nash	
1986	The Men's Club	Teensy	
1987	Sister, Sister	Lucy Bonnard	
1987	Under Cover	Tanille Lareoux	
1988	Heart of Midnight	Carol Rivers	
1989	The Big Picture	Lydia Johnson	
1989	Last Exit to Brooklyn	Tralala	
1990	Buried Alive	Joanna Goodman	
1990	Miami Blues	Susie Waggoner	
1991	Backdraft	Jennifer Vaitkus	
1991	Crooked Hearts	Marriet Hoffman	
1991	Rush	Kristen Cates	
1992	Single White Female	Hedra 'Hedy' Carlson / Ellen Besch	
1993	Short Cuts	Lois Kaiser	
1994	The Hudsucker Proxy	Amy Archer	
1994	Mrs. Parker and the Vicious Circle	Dorothy Parker	
1995	Dolores Claiborne	Selena St. George	
1995	Georgia	Sadie Flood	Also producer
1996	Kansas City	Blondie O'Hara	
1996	Bastard Out of Carolina	Anney Boatwright	
1997	Washington Square	Catherine Sloper	
1997	A Thousand Acres	Caroline Cook	
1999	Existenz	Allegra Geller	
2000	The King Is Alive	Gina	
2000	Skipped Parts	Lydia Callahan	Also co-producer
2001	The Anniversary Party	Sally Therrian	Also co-writer, co-producer and co-director with Alan Cumming
2001	The Quickie	Lisa	
2002	Hey Arnold!: The Movie	Bridget	Voice
2002	Road to Perdition	Annie Sullivan	
2002	Crossed Over	Karla Faye Tucker	
2003	In the Cut	Pauline	
2004	The Machinist	Stevie	
2004	Palindromes	Mark Aviva	
2004	Childstar	Suzanne	
2005	The Jacket	Dr. Beth Lorenson	
2005	Rag Tale	Mary Josephine Morton	
2007	Margot at the Wedding	Pauline	
2008	Synecdoche, New York	Maria	
2010	Greenberg	Beth	Also, writer and producer
2013	The Spectacular Now	Sara Keely	
2013	Kill Your Darlings	Naomi Ginsberg	
2013	The Moment	Lee	
2013	Hateship, Loveship	Chloe	
2013	Jake Squared	Sheryl	
2014	Welcome to Me	Deb Moseley	
2014	Me	Kelly	
2015	Alex of Venice	Maureen	
2015	Anomalisa	Lisa Hesselman	Voice
2015	The Hateful Eight	'Crazy' Daisy Domergue	
2016	Morgan	Dr. Kathy Grieff	
2016	LBJ	Lady Bird Johnson	
2017	Good Time	Corey Ellman	
2017	Amityville: The Awakening	Joan Walker	
2018	Annihilation	Dr. Ventress	
2018	White Boy Rick	FBI Agent Alex Snyder	
2019	Sid & Judy	Judy Garland	Documentary film; Voice
2019	QT8: The First Eight	Herself	Documentary film
2020	Possessor	Girder	
2021	The Woman in the Window	Jane Russell	
2021	Awake	Dr. Murphy	
2022	Sharp Stick	Marilyn	
2023	Poolman	Susan Kerkovish	
2025	Night Always Comes	Doreen	
2026	Crime 101	Angie Lubesnick	
2026	Confession	Anya	
TBA	Deep Cuts †		Filming

Key
†	Denotes films that have not yet been released

=== Television ===
Jennifer Jason Leigh's television appearances
Year	Title	Role	Notes/Ref.
1977	Baretta	Marcie	Episode: "Open Season"
1978	Family	Jenny Blair	Episode: "And Baby Makes Three"
1978	The Wonderful World of Disney	Heather	Episode: "The Young Runaways"
1980	Angel City	Kristy Teeter	Television film
1981	The Waltons	Kathy Seals	Episode: "The Pursuit"
1981	CBS Schoolbreak Special	Laurie Mcintyre	Episode: "I Think I'm Having a Baby"
1981	The Killing of Randy Webster	Amy Wheeler	Television film
1981	The Best Little Girl in the World	Casey Powell	Television film
1982	Trapper John, M.D.	Karen McCall	Episode: "The One and Only"
1982	The First Time	Bonnie Dillon	Television film
1983	ABC Afterschool Special	Andrea Fairchild	Episode: "Have You Ever Been Ashamed of Your Parents?"
1983	Girls of the White Orchid	Carol Heath	Television film; alternative title Death Ride to Osaka
1990	Buried Alive	Joanna Goodman	Television film
1998	The Love Letter	Elizabeth Whitcomb	Television film
1998	King of the Hill	Amy	Voice, episode: "I Remember Mono"
1998	Tracey Takes On...	Paige Garland	Episode: "Sports"
1998	Adventures from the Book of Virtues	Alexandra	Voice, episode: "Gratitude"
1998	Thanks of a Grateful Nation	Teri Small	Television film
1998	Hercules	Tempest	Voice, 4 episodes
1999	Superman: The Animated Series	Cetea	Voice, episode: "Absolute Power"
1999	Todd McFarlane's Spawn	Lily	Voice, 2 episodes
2000	Twitch City	Faith	Episode: "The Life of Reilly"
2001	Frasier	Estelle	Voice, episode: "The Two Hundredth"
2002	Mission Hill	Eunice Eulmeyer	Voice, episode: "Kevin Loves Weirdie"
2009–2012	Weeds	Jill Price-Grey	16 episodes
2012	Revenge	Kara Clarke-Murphy	7 episodes
2014	Open	Holly	Pilot
2017	Twin Peaks	Chantal Hutchens	6 episodes
2017–2021	Atypical	Elsa Gardner	38 episodes; also, producer
2018	Patrick Melrose	Eleanor Melrose	5 episodes
2019	The Affair	Adeline Taylor	2 episodes
2021	Lisey's Story	Darla Debusher	8 episodes
2023	Hunters	Chava Apfelbaum	7 episodes
2023–2024	Fargo	Lorraine Lyon	Season 5; main role
2026	Something Very Bad Is Going to Happen	Victoria Cunningham	Main role
2026	High Potential	Willa Quinn	Special guest star (Season 2)
TBA	Bishop †	Jillian Graves	Main role

Key
†	Denotes television productions that have not yet been released

=== Stage ===
Jennifer Jason Leigh's stage appearances
Year	Title	Role	Theater	Notes/Ref.
1986	Picnic	Madge Owens	Ahmanson Theatre	April 8, 1986 – May 24, 1986
1989	Sunshine	Sunshine	Circle Repertory Theatre	December 9, 1989 – January 14, 1990
1998	Cabaret	Sally Bowles	Stephen Sondheim Theatre; Studio 54	August 4, 1998 – February 28, 1999
2001	Proof	Catherine	Walter Kerr Theatre	September 13, 2001 – June 30, 2002
2005	Theater of the New Ear: Anomalisa	Lisa	Royce Hall	September 14, 2005 – September 16, 2005
2005	Abigail's Party	Beverly	Acorn Theater	December 1, 2005 – March 11, 2006
2011	The House of Blue Leaves	Bunny Flingus	Walter Kerr Theatre	April 25, 2011 – June 25, 2011

== Awards ==
=== Films ===
Short Cuts

- Golden Globe Special Ensemble Cast Award (non-competitive)
- Volpi Cup for Best Ensemble Cast

Mrs. Parker and the Vicious Circle

- Chicago Film Critics Association Award for Best Actress
- National Society of Film Critics Award for Best Actress
- Nominated – Golden Globe Award for Best Actress in a Motion Picture – Drama

Anomalisa

- Nominated - Annie Award for Voice Acting in a Feature Production
- Nominated - Independent Spirit Awards for Best Supporting Female

The Hateful Eight

- Won – Capri Supporting Actress Award
- Won – CinEuphoria Awards for Best Actress
- Won – National Board of Review for Best Supporting Actress
- Won – North Texas Film Critics Association for Best Supporting Actress
- Won – Online Film & Television Association for Best Supporting Actress
- Won – San Diego Film Critics Society Awards for Best Supporting Actress
- Nominated – Academy Award for Best Supporting Actress
- Nominated – Golden Globe Award for Best Supporting Actress – Motion Picture
- Nominated – BAFTA Award for Best Actress in a Supporting Role
- Nominated – AACTA International Award for Best Supporting Actress
- Nominated – Austin Film Critics Association for Best Supporting Actress
- Nominated – Awards Circuit Community Awards for Best Supporting Actress
- Nominated – Broadcast Film Critics Association Awards for Best Supporting Actress
- Nominated – Central Ohio Film Critics Association for Best Supporting Actress
- Nominated – Chicago Film Critics Association Awards for Best Supporting Actress
- Nominated – Dallas-Fort Worth Film Critics Association Awards for Best Supporting Actress
- Nominated – Denver Film Critics Society for Best Supporting Actress
- Nominated – Detroit Film Critics Society Awards for Best Supporting Actress
- Nominated – Florida Film Critics Circle Awards for Best Supporting Actress
- Nominated – Georgia Film Critics Association for Best Supporting Actress
- Nominated – Gold Derby Awards for Best Supporting Actress
- Nominated – Golden Schmoes Awards for Best Supporting Actress of the Year
- Nominated – Houston Film Critics Society Awards for Best Supporting Actress
- Nominated – IndieWire Critics' Poll for Best Supporting Actress
- Nominated – International Cinephile Society Awards for Best Supporting Actress
- Nominated – Kansas City Film Critics Circle Awards for Best Supporting Actress
- Nominated – North Carolina Film Critics Association for Best Supporting Actress
- Nominated – Phoenix Critics Circle for Best Supporting Actress
- Nominated – Seattle Film Critics Awards for Best Supporting Actress
- Nominated – St. Louis Film Critics Association for Best Supporting Actress
- Nominated – Vancouver Film Critics Circle for Best Supporting Actress
- Nominated – Village Voice Film Poll for Best Supporting Actress
- Nominated – Washington D.C. Area Film Critics Association Awards for Best Supporting Actress

=== TV ===
Thanks from a Grateful Nation

- Nominated — Satellite Award for Best Actress – Miniseries or Television Film

=== Theatre ===
Abigail's Party

- Nominated — Drama Desk Award for Outstanding Actress in a Play
- Nominated — Lucille Lortel Award for Outstanding Lead Actress
