= Never Met Picasso =

- Directed by: Stephen Kijak
- Written by: Stephen Kijak
- Produced by: Patrick Cunningham; Stephen Kijak
- Starring: Alexis Arquette; Margot Kidder; Georgia Ragsdale
- Cinematography: David Tames
- Edited by: Angelica Brisk
- Music by: Kristin Hersh; Bill Lee
- Distributed by: Turbulent Arts
- Release dates: November 9, 1996 (Reeling Chicago Gay Lesbian Film Festival); November 28, 1997
- Running time: 101 minutes
- Country: United States
- Language: English

Never Met Picasso is a 1996 American comedy-drama film directed by Stephen Kijak and starring Alexis Arquette and Margot Kidder. Its plot follows a thirty-year-old gay man who attempts to get his life in order while living with his actress mother in Boston.

== Cast ==
- Alexis Arquette as Andrew Magnus
- Margot Kidder as Genna Magnus
- Georgia Ragsdale as Lucy
- Don McKellar as Jerry
- Keith David as Larry
- Alvin Epstein as Uncle Alfred

== Reception ==
Kevin Thomas of the Los Angeles Times wrote that "Arquette and Kidder given the chance to come across as quite appealing" in their roles.
