= Sid & Judy =

- Release poster
- Directed by: Stephen Kijak
- Written by: Claire Didier; Stephen Kijak
- Produced by: John Battsek; Diane Becker
- Edited by: Claire Didier
- Music by: Laura Karpman
- Production companies: Universal Pictures; Passion Pictures
- Distributed by: Showtime
- Release date: June 26, 2019
- Country: United States
- Language: English

Sid & Judy is a 2019 documentary film that delves into the life and career of the American actress and singer Judy Garland through the lens of her relationship with her third husband, the American producer and businessman Sidney Luft. The film combines archival footage, audio recordings, and photographs to paint a vivid portrait of Garland's tumultuous existence and the entertainment industry that shaped her life. Narrated by actors Jon Hamm and Jennifer Jason Leigh, the documentary juxtaposes Garland's immense talent with the exploitation and misogyny she faced throughout her career.

The film chronicles Garland's professional achievements and highlights the personal challenges she endured, particularly the struggles with addiction that began amidst her childhood in show business. Showcasing the complexities of Garland's character, the film illustrates her multifaceted artistry—an embodiment of vaudeville, radio, film, and stage performance. Sid & Judy emphasizes her vulnerability and resilience, reflecting on the darker side of fame and the impact of systemic misogyny in Hollywood. Critics praised the documentary for its balanced approach, allowing Garland's voice to resonate through her performances and spoken recordings, while also addressing the societal issues that affected her life.

== Production ==
Directed by the American filmmaker Stephen Kijak, the documentary draws upon the memoirs of Luft, to explore the complex relationship between Garland and her tumultuous life in the entertainment industry. Kijak noted that the project originated from the unique access to the Luft estate and the memoir, allowing the film to present a nuanced portrayal of both characters involved.

Principal photography for Sid & Judy commenced on March 19, 2018, in London. Various filming locations were utilized, including West London Film Studios, Pinewood Studios, Hackney Empire, and Tring Park School for the Performing Arts.

The film seeks to construct a portrait of Garland that captures her vulnerabilities as well as her remarkable resilience and extraordinary talent. Kijak emphasizes the intent to avoid a one-sided narrative, allowing both Garland and Luft's perspectives to inform the story, thereby enriching the portrayal of Garland as a multifaceted icon of American entertainment.

== Reception ==
Upon its release, Sid and Judy received a generally positive critical response, highlighting the film's intimate portrayal of Garland and the complexities of her life. Critics appreciated the documentary's authentic exploration of Garland's psyche, portraying both her struggles and triumphs throughout her career. Datebook's Tony Bravo emphasized the film's personal touch, stating that it delved deeply into both Garland as an artist and as a human being. This authenticity allowed audiences to witness the more vulnerable aspects of her life, making the narrative more compelling and poignant. Bravo noted that, despite the potential for the film to become overly sentimental or hagiographic, it managed to present a balanced view that acknowledged both Garland's remarkable talent and the darker realities of her experiences in the entertainment industry. He additionally noted the historical context of Garland's struggles, particularly regarding the treatment of stars by the Hollywood studio system. Critics described how she was subjected to rigorous demands to maintain her appearance and energy, often leading to detrimental health effects from the use of amphetamines prescribed by studio doctors. This aspect of her story added a layer of tragedy to her narrative, portraying her as a victim of an industry that commodified her talent without regard for her well-being.
