= Mako Kamitsuna =

American film director, editor and writer

Mako Kamitsuna (Houston, Texas) is an American film director, editor and writer, raised in Hiroshima, Japan. She studied philosophy at Columbia University. In 2016, she received with John Maringouin the Special Jury Award of the Sundance Film Festival in the Best Editing category by We Are X. Kamitsuna has been invited to the Oscars.

== Filmography ==
- The Lull Breaker (Short, 2013), Director and writer
- She, Who Excels in Solitude (Short, 2013), Director and writer
- Katya (Short, 2011), Director and writer
- Betty Anderson (Short, 2000), Director and writer
- We Are X (2016), Editor
- Blackhat (2015), Editor
- Shōgun (2024 Miniseries), Consulting Producer
