= Parisa Tabriz =

American computer security expert (born 1983)

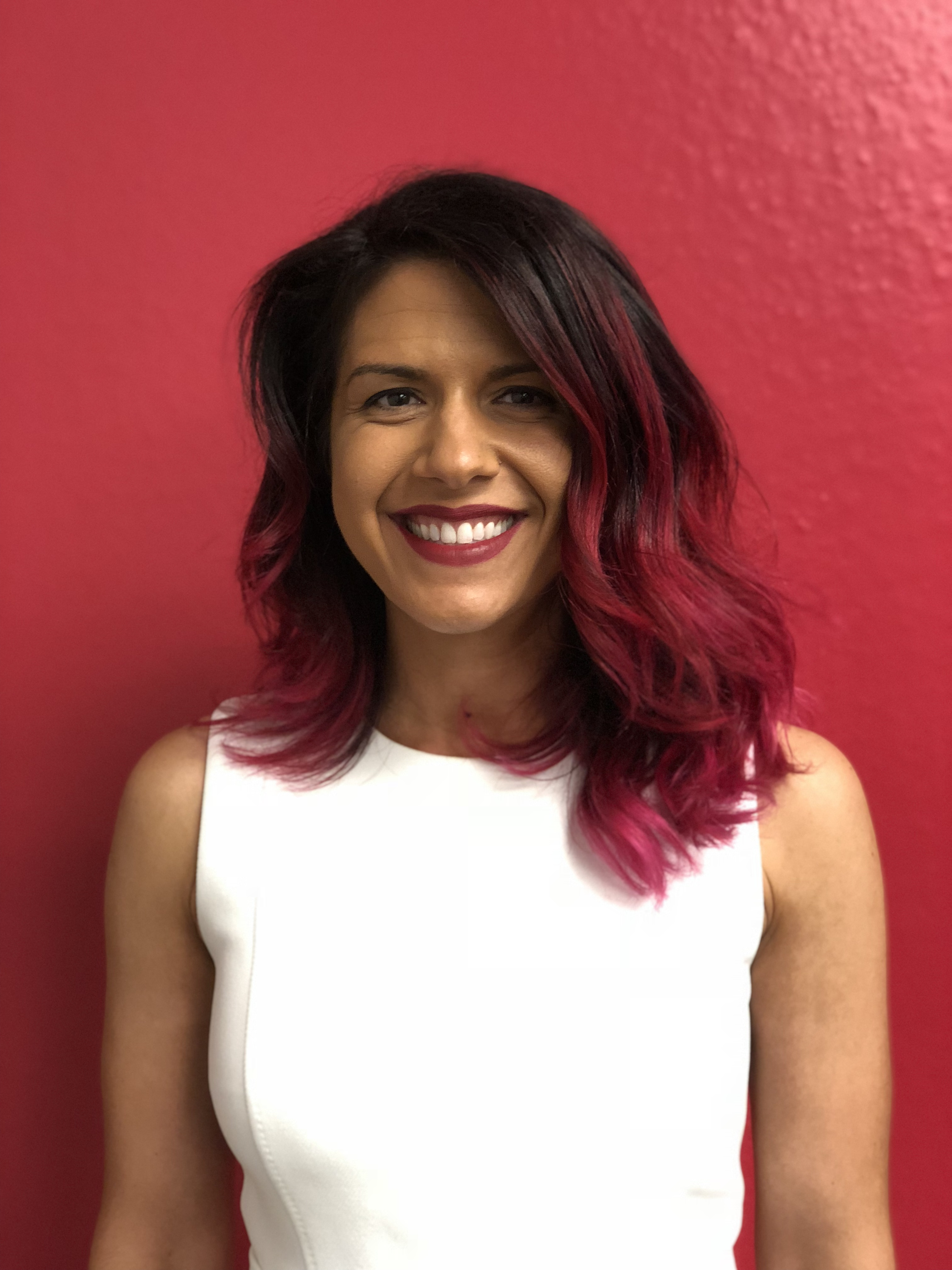
- Born: 1983 (age 42–43); Chicago, Illinois, United States
- Occupation: Computer security expert
- Known for: Google's "Security Princess"; Google Chrome; Co-founder, Our Security Advocates

Parisa Tabriz is an American engineer, computer security expert, and executive working for Google as a Vice President and General Manager of Google Chrome. She is known professionally by her semi-official job title, "Security Princess".

== Early life and education ==
Parisa Tabriz was born in 1983 to an Iranian father, a doctor, and a Polish-American mother, a nurse. She grew up in the suburbs of Chicago and is the older sister of two brothers. Tabriz was not exposed to coding and computer science until her first year at university.

Tabriz initially enrolled at the University of Illinois at Urbana–Champaign to study computer engineering, but soon became interested in coding and computer science. She completed a Bachelor of Computer Science and Master of Computer Science degree at the university and did research in wireless security and attacks on privacy-enhancing technologies, co-authoring papers with her advisor Nikita Borisov. She was an active member of a student club interested in computer security, which she joined because her own website was hacked.

== Career ==
Tabriz was offered a summer internship with Google's security team while at college, and joined the company a few months after her graduation in 2007. While preparing to attend a conference in Tokyo with Google, she decided to use the job title "Security Princess" on her business card rather than the conventional "information security engineer" since it sounded less boring and considered it ironic. Tabriz trained Google staff interested in learning more about security and worked with youth at DEFCON and Girl Scouts of the USA to expose a more diverse set of people to the field of computer security.

In 2013, Tabriz took over responsibility for the security of Google Chrome. Tabriz presented the talk "Got SSL?" at the Chrome Dev Summit and led an effort to drive adoption of the HTTPS protocol. In 2015, less than 50% of traffic seen by Chrome was over HTTPS, and by 2019, the percentage of HTTPS traffic had increased to 73-95% across all platforms. Tabriz has spoken out against government interception of HTTPS connections on the public Internet.

In 2016, Tabriz took over responsibility for Project Zero, an offensive security research group dedicated to finding zero day vulnerabilities and reducing the harm caused by targeted attacks.

In 2018, Tabriz was the keynote speaker at Black Hat Conference and emphasized the need to tackle the root cause of security issues, invest and celebrate progress on long-arc projects, and build out coalitions beyond security experts. That same year, in response to the RSA Conference having only one non-male keynote speaker in a line-up of 20 keynotes, Tabriz co-founded the Our Security Advocates conference, OURSA. In only five days, Tabriz and organizers pulled together a speaker line-up consisting of expert speakers from under-represented backgrounds, 14 speakers of which were women.

In 2020, Tabriz became head of Product and Engineering for Google Chrome.

== Recognition ==
- Fortune: 40 under 40 list (2018)
- Wired's 20 Tech Visionaries Creating the Future list (2017)
- Forbes Top 30 People Under 30 To Watch in the Technology Industry list (2012)
