= Cinemania (film) =

- Directed by: Angela Christlieb; Stephen Kijak
- Produced by: Gunter Hanfgarn; Stephen Kijak; Avi Weider
- Starring: Jack Angstreich; Eric Chadbourne; Bill Heidbreder; Roberta Hill; Harvey Schwartz
- Cinematography: Angela Christlieb; Stephen Kijak
- Edited by: Angela Christlieb
- Music by: Stereo Total; Robert Drasnin
- Distributed by: LOOP Filmworks
- Release date: 2002
- Running time: 83 minutes
- Countries: Germany; United States
- Language: English

Cinemania is a 2002 German/American documentary film about five obsessed cinephiles, who, throughout the year, each see two to five films a day and work out a daily schedule to see them in theatres across New York City. The documentary is directed by Angela Christlieb and Stephen Kijak.

== Cast ==
- Eric Chadbourne — A cinephile who lives on disability benefits, and who vociferously prefers musicals and romantic-comedies to foreign films. He is the only profiled character in the documentary who has succumbed to watching films on video, of which he seems to own thousands (the others steadfastly refuse to watch TV under any circumstances; Roberta Hill states that she "only has nightmares in video.")
- Harvey Schwartz — A cinephile who has traits found among those with Asperger syndrome, who lives on disability benefits. According to Jack, Harvey has no discerning taste in film and will watch just about anything, including The Amazing Crab Monster. He can quote the exact running time of every film he's ever seen from memory. He owns hundreds of soundtrack LPs but doesn't have a turntable.
- Bill Heidbreder — A cinephile who defines his taste in film as "effeminate", as he prefers "relationship" films to action films. He is an NYU grad student and amateur philosopher who lives on unemployment benefits.
- Jack Angstreich — The most heavily profiled member of the quintet, Jack's justification for his abnormal behavior is to not deny what he considers to be a "visionary" lifestyle, that there is no "correct" way to live, and really has no interest in real life beyond the cinema. He claims that he wouldn't want to make love to Rita Hayworth unless he was doing it in black-and-white. Living off an inheritance, Jack sees upwards of five films per day (and claims to have seen over 1,000 films in eight months at one point), and deliberately eats a constipating diet so he won't be interrupted while watching a film and have to go to the bathroom.
- Roberta Hill – An obsessive-compulsive woman who, according to Jack, "is so far in the prison [of cinephilia], that to me, it's just a hopeless, Sisyphean lifestyle." Has kept every piece of film-memorabilia she's got her hands on for what appears to be the last five decades, including ticket-stubs, programs, fliers, a promotional bottle of water from an independent film called Water, and promotional plastic cups from Last Action Hero and Jurassic Park. Roberta has been banned from many theaters for her rude and uncouth behavior, which has included attacking ushers who have torn too much paper off her ticket-stubs.

== Reception ==
On the review aggregator website Rotten Tomatoes, 86% of 37 critics' reviews are positive. Metacritic, which uses a weighted average, assigned the film a score of 67 out of 100, based on 14 critics, indicating "generally favorable" reviews.

Stephen Holden of The New York Times called the film "crisp" and "intelligent".

Roger Ebert of the Chicago Sun-Times gave the film three out of four stars and wrote, "These are not crazy people. Maladjusted and obsessed, yes, but who's to say what normal is? I think it makes more sense to see movies all day than to golf, play video games or gamble. Not everyone agrees. I know people like these, and I understand their desire to be absorbed in the darkness and fantasy."

== See also ==
- 2002 in film
