= Backstreet Boys: Show 'Em What You're Made Of =

- Theatrical release poster
- Directed by: Stephen Kijak
- Produced by: Mia Bays
- Starring: AJ McLean; Brian Littrell; Howie Dorough; Kevin Richardson; Nick Carter
- Cinematography: James Henry
- Edited by: Ben Stark; Cinzia Baldessari
- Music by: Backstreet Boys
- Production company: Pulse Films
- Distributed by: Gravitas Ventures
- Release dates: January 30, 2015 (United States); February 26, 2015 (United Kingdom)
- Running time: 109 minutes
- Countries: United States; United Kingdom
- Language: English
- Budget: $1,000,000 (estimated)
- Box office: $2,837,800

Backstreet Boys: Show 'Em What You're Made Of is a 2015 American documentary film about the career of the American vocal group Backstreet Boys, released on January 30, 2015 in the U.S., and was released on February 26, 2015 in the UK and Europe, and March 28, 2015 for the rest of the world. It was directed by Stephen Kijak.

The film was shot over the span of two years and chronicles their entire career journey up to the making of their 2013 album In a World Like This, and throughout the subsequent world tour supporting it.

== Synopsis ==
From 1999 to about 2002 we were the biggest band in the world. No one thought it was going to be as big as it was, then it just stopped. And what do you do when you’re a full-grown man in a boy band?

— Brian Littrell

The film opens with scenes of the group living together in a house in London, just the five of them without families, wives, or kids, as they work on their 20th anniversary album, In a World Like This. Shots of them working together, hanging out together, playing soccer, going shopping, hiking a mountain, were interwoven together with clips of individual members talking about their history. The film then shows Brian Littrell going to therapy for his ailment, he reveals that he was diagnosed with vocal cord dysphonia and a neurological problem called dystonia.

Throughout the film, the entire group goes to each member's hometown, visiting their old church, school, teachers. Kevin Richardson recounts the time leading up to his father's death and shows his bandmates the church where he used to spend most of his time growing up. Howie Dorough brings his bandmates to his old house and tells them about the time their backyard was overrun with rabbits and he was ordered by his father to kill them, which he failed to do.

The group also visits Nick Carter's old elementary school and dance school, where he breaks down and cries remembering how performing was a way for him to escape the negativity in his home, where his parents used to fight all the time. AJ McLean also visits his old school and met with his teachers, and proceeds to recite a theatrical monologue he used to perform as a child. Littrell also visits his old school and met with his singing teacher, who was the first person to discover his talent. He also brings his bandmates to visit his church, where he proceeds to sit down at the altar and starts to sing, and admits that his voice problem is an ongoing struggle for him.

The group members also express their disappointment in Lou Pearlman, the man who put them together and subsequently created their rival NSYNC. They also talk about how he robbed them of their money and how badly they were treated later on. They visit his mansion, now stripped bare by the IRS since his time in jail, and was paid back to all the people he had scammed.

The film also features many old clips of the group rehearsing and performing in their early days, before they had gotten their recording contract in 1994. They had been touring schools across the US, and then found success in Europe and released their debut album, which was never released in the US.

== Cast ==
- AJ McLean
- Brian Littrell
- Howie Dorough
- Kevin Richardson
- Nick Carter

== Production ==
In 2012, as they were gearing up to record a new album, the group was looking to make a documentary of the whole recording process. However the idea quickly grew to make a movie about their whole career instead. "We've been filming during the making of the record, the rehearsals for the tour, while we've been out on the road. It's kind of a making-of the record along with our story, how we got together and the ups and downs and the rollercoaster that we've been on," band member Kevin Richardson said.

The group started filming when they moved into a house together all by themselves in London in July 2012. Filming process continued as the entire group visited each member's hometown in September 2012 to learn more about one another's lives before joining the group in 1993.

On February 11, 2013 The Hollywood Reporter announced that Stephen Kijak would be directing a feature documentary about the Backstreet Boys, a film being produced by Mia Bays and Pulse Films. The banner also co-produced the Katy Perry/Paramount film Part of Me 3D and No Distance Left to Run, about seminal U.K. band Blur by director duo thirtytwo.

== Promotion ==
During Backstreet Boys 2013 and 2014 consecutive world tour, they previewed the movie during the rest time. On January 27, 2015, Backstreet Boys promoted the documentary film on the Today Show.

== Release ==
The film was officially released on January 30, 2015 in the US, and was released on February 26, 2015 in the UK and Europe, and March 28 in Latin America, Canada, Asia, Australia, and New Zealand. The group will be present and perform at the UK premiere on February 26, 2015 in London. The performance will be broadcast live by satellite for UK and European countries, and will be recorded and played in the cinema for other countries where the release is not due until March 2015. The film screened on MusicMax on Foxtel in Australia on May 30.

The US premiere was held on January 29 at Arclight Cinemas in Los Angeles. The band was present and some celebrities attended the event, such as Lance Bass from N'Sync, Erik-Michael Estrada from O-Town, and Jeff Timmons from 98 Degrees.

On January 30, the first day of US release, the movie topped the documentary chart on the US iTunes Store and Google Play Store, where it held the position for a week, and No. 2 on iTunes Overall Movie Chart. The movie grossed $282,000 across 129 screens in U.S during the opening weekend. To date, it totally grossed $2,837,800 worldwide.

=== Critical reception ===
Backstreet Boys: Show 'Em What You're Made Of has received mostly positive reviews prior to release, currently holding a 69% critics on Rotten Tomatoes based on 16 reviews, with average rate of 6.8 out of 10. and a 42/100 rating on Metacritic based on 6 reviews, signifying "mixed or average" reviews.

Artistdirect gave it 5 out of 5 stars, noting that "One of the film’s most powerful aspects is its focus on the creation of the band’s latest offering of 2013’s In a World Like This. It’s the moment where AJ McLean, Howie Dorough, Nick Carter, Kevin Richardson, and Brian Littrell really shine the most. Watching them jamming in the studio also feels strangely poignant as the purported image has always been of the quintet on stage in front of thousands dancing with no instruments. These intimate moments make Show ‘Em What You’re Made Of a true gem as far as music documentaries go." Village Voice gave it an average score of 70, Amy Nicholson said Show 'Em What You're Made Of convincingly argues that these boy-men have something to say about the fickleness of fate — something they knew more about as young men than any of the cynics who dismissed them for dancing in unison. The hardest part will be convincing people to listen."

The negative review came from The New York Times, Neil Genzlinger felt "It is insight-free and cliché-heavy, with the five sharing obvious reminiscences about the thrill of superstardom, visiting haunts from their youth, shooting baskets and occasionally rehearsing."

=== Home video ===
In January 2015, the band announced plans of releasing a DVD/Blu-ray combo pack in the summer of that year. Band member AJ McLean said that there will be deleted scenes and bonus footage in the DVD, along with an exclusive interview with the late John ‘Q’ Elgani, who was the head of their security. He had been with the group since 1996 and died in 2013. On April 28, the DVD was officially released in US and Canada, and topped the Music Videos & Concerts and Documentary chart consecutively."Amazon". Amazon. April 28, 2015.

=== Extended cut ===
An extended version of the film, running 130 minutes, 20 minutes longer than the theatrical release, was screened at the sneak peek events.

== Charts ==
Chart (2015)	Peak position
Billboard Music DVD Chart	4

== See also ==
- List of documentary films
