= LOOP Filmworks =

American production company

LOOP Filmworks was an American production company formed by David Chartier and later managed by partner Avi Zev Weider.

== History ==
David Chartier, who previously worked at Olive Jar Animation, Curious Pictures, and Will Vinton Studios, founded LOOP Filmworks in 1998. The following year, Avi Zev Weider, who had previously been producing for Loop under contract, was made an equal partner in the business.

LOOP Digitalworks was founded in 2000 to create websites. Chartier exited the company in 2004 after moving to Los Angeles for personal reasons, leaving Weider full control of the company. Weider continued to run Loop until 2011.

In 2011, Weider reorganized the company as Loop Filmworks (NY), LLC, under which he produced the feature documentary films Welcome to the Machine (premiered at SXSW 2012) and Danland (premiered at Slamdance 2012). Avi Zev Weider continues to operate Loop Filmworks, and is developing several feature film projects.

== Filmography ==
- I Remember (1998)
- Cinemania (2002)
- Witches in Exile (opening titles) (2004)
- Welcome to the Machine (2012)
- Danland (2012)

=== Commercials ===
- Nickelodeon
- Locomotion (1997)
- Outdoor Life Network (late 1990s, 2003-2004)
- Playhouse Disney (1999)
- Comedy Central
- HBO (1999-2001)
- Bravo (2000-2003)
- Noggin (2000-2002)
- VH1
- USA Network
- Independent Film Channel
- Food Network
- Sci-Fi Channel
- Cartoon Network
- Grey Advertising
- Project Liberty (2002)
- Invention Submission Corporation (2003-2004)
- American Red Cross (2003)
- College Sports Television (2003)
- Trio (2004)
