= Mass surveillance in popular culture =

Mass surveillance in popular culture is a common theme. There are numerous novels, nonfiction books, films, TV shows, and video games, all taking a critical view of surveillance. Some well known examples include George Orwell's novel Nineteen Eighty-Four (1948), Peter Jackson's film adaptations of The Lord of the Rings (2001–2003), and Christopher Nolan's film The Dark Knight (2008). However, there are also a few novels that are optimistic about surveillance.

== Critical of mass surveillance ==
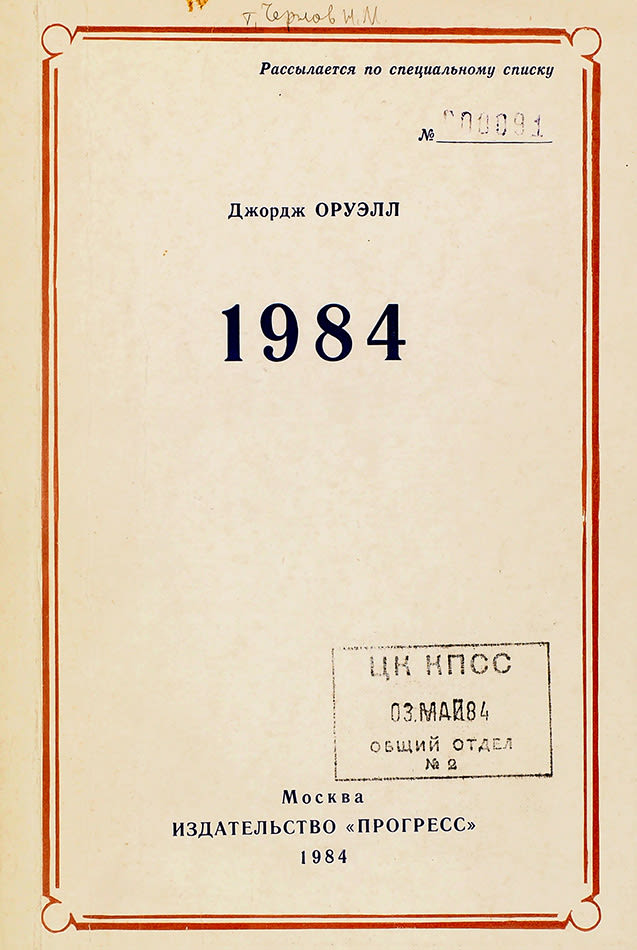
Cover of Nineteen Eighty-Four, as published in the Soviet Union

=== Novels and novellas ===
- Nineteen Eighty-Four, a novel by George Orwell depicting life under an omnipresent totalitarian state, and is probably the most prominent of the media listed; the 'Big Brother' who watches over the novel's characters is now used to describe any form of spying on or interfering with the public, such as CCTV cameras.
- We, a 1920 novel by Russian author Yevgeny Zamyatin, that predates Nineteen Eighty-Four and was read by its author George Orwell.
- Little Brother by Cory Doctorow, set in San Francisco after a major terrorist attack; the DHS uses technologies such as RFIDs and surveillance cameras to create a totalitarian system of control.
- The Minority Report, a story by Philip K. Dick about a society that arrests people for crimes they have yet to commit (made into a movie in 2002).
- A Scanner Darkly, another novel by Philip K. Dick, examines how close we are as a society to complete surveillance by law enforcement.
- Oath of Fealty, a 1982 novel by Larry Niven and Jerry Pournelle describing a large arcology whose dwellers and visitors are constantly being of surveilled by a variety of technologies
- V for Vendetta, a graphic novel by Alan Moore and David Lloyd

=== Nonfiction books ===
- The Transparent Society by David Brin, discusses various scenarios for the future considering the spread of cheap web-cameras, increases in government security initiatives, and the possible death of encryption if quantum computing becomes reality.
- Discipline and Punish by the critical theorist Michel Foucault is generally taken as being one of the paradigmatic works on theories of surveillance and discipline
- Welcome to the Machine: Science, Surveillance and the Culture of Control by Social and Environmental philosopher, Derrick Jensen thoroughly examines the use of RFID chips, nanotechnology, military technology, science, and surveillance.

=== Films and videos ===
- Peter Jackson's movie adaptation of The Lord of the Rings by J. R. R. Tolkien, depicts the all-seeing Eye of Sauron.
- THX 1138, a 1971 film by George Lucas depicting life in an underground dystopia where all human activities are monitored centrally at all times. A high level of control is exerted upon the populace through ever-present faceless, android police officers and mandatory, regulated use of special drugs to suppress emotion, including sexual desire. The film was first made as a student project in the University of Southern California and called Electronic Labyrinth: THX 1138 4EB.
- Blue Thunder, 1983 movie starring Roy Scheider
- Brazil, a film by Terry Gilliam depicting an oppressive total information awareness society
- Pizza, a short Flash video by the American Civil Liberties Union depicting ordering pizza by phone in a Total Surveillance Society.
- Equilibrium, 2002 film wherein a dystopian future society surviving the third world war takes an emotion-suppressing drug and where the general public is constantly watched by the government to make sure that no one breaks the equilibrium.
- The Listening, a 2006 movie in which a rogue NSA employee fights against the agency's Echelon system and one of its corporate partners.
- Eagle Eye, a 2008 movie which portrays how surveillance can get out of hand.
- The Lives of Others, the 2006 German drama film, movingly conveys the terrible impact that constant surveillance has on the emotional wellbeing and life prospects of those subjected to it.
- Tomorrow Never Dies, the eighteenth film in the James Bond series. The plot revolves around the ruthless Murdochesque media baron, Elliot Carver, whose newspapers print false stories that are related to Carver's secret agenda. A clear sign of his vanity and a reference to Big Brother, much of Carver's headquarters in Hamburg is decorated with vast, imposing banners, with Carver's face glaring out.
- Enemy of the State, a 1998 film starring Will Smith and Gene Hackman, portrays an attorney who is the target of an NSA cover-up related to a bill in Congress that would expand the federal government's surveillance powers.
- The Dark Knight, the 2008 summer blockbuster delved into whether the public security against the Joker's actions warranted Batman's mass scale spying on Gotham City's citizens using cell phone technology. Lucius Fox, Morgan Freeman's character, threatened to quit Wayne Enterprises over Batman's private surveillance of Gotham claiming that no one man should possess such power. However the hero of the movie, Batman, claimed that mass surveillance of citizens was vital to fight "terrorism". Batman came to Lucius opinion at the end of the film, when he destroyed the surveillance system.
- The 2016 German-American biographical political thriller film Snowden directed by Oliver Stone follows Edward Snowden, an American computer professional leaking classified information on ongoing mass surveillance by the National Security Agency to the public in June 2013.

=== TV shows ===
- The Last Enemy, a 2008 5 episode BBC television series which dealt with Total Information Awareness monitoring of near-future Britain, and the Government's use of race-specific remote drugs which could be triggered to affect one population, but not the other.
- Person of Interest, a CBS TV series that aired from September 2011 to June 2016 that depicts a machine which spies on each citizen of the United States. The Machine makes extensive use of surveillance cameras, telephone conversations, internet usage, public records, satellite-driven technology and virtually any mean of physical/digital communication. It does so automatically, without any human interventions (only seven people in the world are aware of its existence). The Machine has the purpose of preventing terrorist attacks, but it sees crimes involving ordinary citizens. It provides the authorities with the SSN of the person of interest, which is either a target or a perpetrator. The NSA has been trying to access the Machine but the software is so well encrypted that no operating system can crack it. Harold Finch is convinced that the government would abuse the Machine if they can access it, and he vows to make sure that no one else gets hold of the Machine. In one episode, an employee of the NSA discovered the existence of the Machine and a black ops unit is ordered to kill him.

=== Video games ===
- Freedom Wars is a PSVita action role-playing game which set in the dystopian future. Most of the human population were sentenced 1,000,000 years of imprisonment since they were born. They were dwelling inside the enclosed metropolitan cities named "Panopticon". The society were under heavy surveillance by numbers of "Accessory" androids. And the criminals were forced to hard labors of finding resources in the outside world, and then contribute to their government to exchange for few years amnesty or gain access to several human rights. In the game, the slogan "We gaze at you" is the parody of "Big Brother is watching you" in Nineteen Eighty-Four.
- Watch Dogs is an action-adventure video game released for PC and for seventh- and eighth-generation video game consoles. In the game, the protagonist Aiden Pearce is a master thief, hacker, and self-appointed vigilante who is able to hack into the city-wide mass surveillance and infrastructure control systems to gather information on and resources from any individual he wishes, to evade law enforcement, to stop crimes before or as they happen, to commit crimes himself if needed, and to manipulate various objects and function of the infrastructure to his advantage. He also discovers that the engineers of these integrated systems are also in the process of establishing a program that can predict human behavior and thus be used for mass social engineering purposes. On several occasions, these systems are also used against Aiden to send law enforcement or criminal enforcers after him in efforts to apprehend or kill him. The game also demonstrates the possibility of taking control of an entire city through unauthorized access and misuse of an integrated infrastructure.

== Optimistic about mass surveillance ==
- The Light of Other Days is a science-fiction book that praises mass surveillance, under the condition that it is available to everyone. It shows a world in which a total lack of privacy results in a decrease in corruption and crime.
- Digital Fortress, novel by Dan Brown, involving an NSA codebreaking machine called 'TRANSLTR', reading and decrypting email messages, with which the NSA allegedly foiled terrorist attacks and mass murders.
