= Stones in Exile =

- Directed by: Stephen Kijak
- Produced by: John Battsek; Mick Jagger; Victoria Pearman; Keith Richards; Charlie Watts
- Cinematography: Grant Gee
- Edited by: Ben Stark
- Production company: Passion Pictures
- Release date: 19 May 2010 (Cannes)
- Running time: 61 minutes
- Country: United States
- Language: English

Stones in Exile is a 2010 documentary film about the recording of the 1972 the Rolling Stones album Exile on Main St. Directed by Stephen Kijak, it premiered at the 2010 Cannes Film Festival. It had its worldwide premiere on Late Night with Jimmy Fallon. Fallon announced on his show that he would mark the re-release of the album with a week's worth of musicians performing songs from the album. The final night of the week, he held the premiere.

== Charts ==
Chart (2010)	Peak position
Australian Music DVDs Chart	2
Austrian Music DVDs Chart	2
Belgian (Flanders) Music DVDs Chart	5
Belgian (Wallonia) Music DVDs Chart	3
Danish Music DVDs Chart	4
Dutch Music DVDs Chart	4
Finnish Music DVDs Chart	7
German Albums Chart	27
Italian Music DVDs Chart	3
New Zealand Music DVDs Chart	3
Norwegian Music DVDs	3
Swedish DVDs Chart	2
Swiss Music DVDs Chart	3
UK Music Video Chart	3
