= Time of Troubles (disambiguation) =

Time of Troubles was a period of political crisis in early 17th-century Russia.

Time of Troubles can also refer to:

- A general period in Arnold J. Toynbee's model of the lifecycle of civilizations (see A Study of History)
- Time of Troubles (Harry Turtledove), a book series part of the Videssos cycle
- Time of Troubles (Forgotten Realms), a Dungeons & Dragons plotline

== See also ==
- The Troubles, a 20th-century conflict in Northern Ireland
- Troubles (disambiguation)
