= Bubble, bubble, toil and trouble =

Bubble, bubble, toil and trouble may refer to:

- a quotation from the 1987 Disney cartoon Much Ado About Scrooge
- "Bubble, Bubble, Toil And Trouble", a 1991 episode of American television sitcom Home Improvement.

== See also ==
- "Double, double toil and trouble", a quotation by the Three Witches in Shakespeare's play Macbeth
- Double, Double, Toil and Trouble, an American Halloween TV film
- "Double, Double, Boy in Trouble", an episode of the American animated television series The Simpsons
- Double Trouble (disambiguation)
