= Troubles (disambiguation) =

The Troubles were an ethno-nationalist conflict in Northern Ireland during the late 20th century.

The term had earlier been used to describe the Irish revolutionary period in the early twentieth century, especially the period of conflict in Ulster in the early 1920s.

Troubles or The Troubles may also refer to:

== Military or political clashes ==
- Great troubles (1359–1381), the civil war of the Golden Horde
- Time of Troubles, a period of Russian history 1598–1613
- Texas Troubles, a slave insurrection panic in 1860
- Corsican conflict or French Troubles, from 1976
- Troubles at Frankfurt, quarrels of the Marian exiles in Frankfurt am Main in the mid-1550s
- Basque conflict or Spanish Troubles, 1959-2011

== Arts and entertainment ==
- Troubles (novel), by J. G. Farrell, 1970
- Troubles, a British band including former members of Hope of the States
- Troubles (album), a 1979 album by Steve Lacy, or the title song
- Troubles, a 1988 television miniseries starring Ian Charleson and Ian Richardson
- "Troubles", a song by Alicia Keys from Songs in A Minor, 2001
- "Troubles", a song bby Denzel Curry from Melt My Eyez See Your Future, 2022
- The Troubles (album), by the Wolfe Tones, 2004
- "The Troubles", a song by U2 from Songs of Innocence, 2014
- The Troubles (Haven), supernatural afflictions in the TV series Haven
- "The Troubles" (Law & Order), a television episode

== See also ==
- Trouble (disambiguation)
- Deep Trouble (disambiguation)
- Double Trouble (disambiguation)
- Irish revolutionary period in the early twentieth century
