= Daily double (disambiguation) =

Daily double is a type of wager offered in horse racing and dog racing in North America. The term is sometimes used colloquially in referring to an athlete or team winning two events in the same day, or to refer to a combination of two things.

Daily double may also refer to:

- Daily double, a special type of clue and wager in the television game show Jeopardy!
- Daily Double, a hamburger offered by McDonald's as a variant of the McDouble
- "Daily Double", a 1950 jazz recording by Pete Daily and his Chicagoans
- Hits Daily Double, an online version of the print magazine Hits
- Bob Dernier and Ryne Sandberg, the two leadoff hitters for the 1984 Chicago Cubs lineup, often called "The Daily Double" by announcer Harry Caray

== See also ==
- Double-double (disambiguation)
