= Hanazuki: Full of Treasures =

Discontinued American animated series (2017–2019)

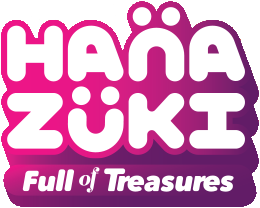
- Also known as: Hanazuki
- Genre: Comedy drama; Science fiction; Fantasy; Adventure
- Based on: The characters by Hanneke Metselaar and Nicola Stumpo
- Developed by: Dave Polsky
- Directed by: Allison Craig; Brian Muelhaupt (S2; shorts)
- Voices of: Jessica DiCicco; Colleen Villard; Cassandra Lee Morris; Michael Sinterniklaas; Avery Waddell
- Composers: John Jennings Boyd; Eric V. Hachikian
- Country of origin: United States
- Original language: English
- No. of seasons: 2
- No. of episodes: 35 (list of episodes)

Production
- Executive producers: Stephen Davis; Meghan McCarthy (S2); Chris Prynoski
- Producers: Winnie Chaffee; Colleen McAllister (S2); Mikiel Houser (S2)
- Editors: Louis Legge (S1); Simon Barreto (S2); Stephen Mlinarcik (S2)
- Running time: 10–11 minutes
- Production companies: Titmouse, Inc.; Hasbro Studios (S1); YouTube Studio (S1); Allspark Animation (S2)

Original release
- Network: YouTube (2017); Discovery Family (2019)
- Release: January 12, 2017 – May 4, 2019

Hanazuki: Full of Treasures (also known as Hanazuki), stylized using umlauts as Han̈azüki, is an American animated web and television series produced by Titmouse, Inc. for Allspark Animation, a division of Hasbro and later by Boulder Media, with Stephen Davis of Allspark and Chris Prynoski of Titmouse serving as executive producers. Made in conjunction with a line of Hanazuki toys, it is based on characters and concepts which were developed by Hanneke Metselaar and Niko Stumpo before Hasbro purchased them in 2010.

The series debuted on YouTube on January 12, 2017, and was produced in conjunction with a line of merchandise to be released later the same year, including a toyline and digital app. The series received praise from critics, drawing favorable comparisons to other animated series such as My Little Pony: Friendship Is Magic and Steven Universe for its storytelling, visual aesthetic, and darker undertones. As of May 2017, the series has amassed over 120 million views. It was renewed for a second season, and aired in March 2019. Titmouse announced a month before the season's debut that they ended production of the series, leaving it on a hiatus with only eight episodes and fifteen shorts languished in development hell, in order for Hasbro to find another studio to do the animation. On August 3, 2017, during the Investor Day presentation, the company were officially announced both a third season of the web series, and a theatrical feature-length animated film, were in development and been ordered. After the web series and its official toy line were effectively canceled and discontinued following the production halts and shifting distribution networks between 2018 and 2019, where Titmouse ended production on the series ahead of Season 2's broadcast, leaving the show on an indefinite hiatus, before moving from YouTube to television on Discovery Family, the network dropped the show, leaving planned arcs and the second-wave merchandise unreleased in the United States, before Hasbro officially ended support for the companion mobile app stake would shutdown on November 10, 2022, and the web series was unrevealed once again.

The series made its American televised debut on December 1, 2018, airing on Discovery Family.

== Premise ==
The series is set in a fictional galaxy of moons that is beset by the "Big Bad", a black, inky miasma that drains the life and color of anything it touches. Each moon is protected by a Moonflower, a plant-like humanoid who uses their moods to activate magical "treasures" that are supplied by an infantile being named Little Dreamer, which can then be planted to grow trees that ward off the Big Bad. The series opens with Hanazuki, a newly born Moonflower, arriving on a moon populated by numerous denizens, including colorful rabbit-like creatures called Hemka. Several episodes focus on Hanazuki and her friends' escapades as she learns about her responsibilities and emotions, ending with her growing a colored Treasure Tree that corresponds with her mood in that episode. As the series progresses, Hanazuki encounters other Moonflowers that have failed at saving their own moons and seek to learn from Hanazuki in order to properly harness their powers against the Big Bad.

== Episodes ==
Season	Episodes	Originally released		
Season	Episodes	First released	Last released	Network
1	27	January 12, 2017	July 14, 2017	YouTube
2	8	March 23, 2019	May 4, 2019	Discovery Family

== Characters ==
=== Moonflowers ===
Moonflowers are the guardians of the galaxy's moons. Created by Little Dreamer, they have white flowers on their heads and highlights that change color depending on their moods, enabling them to grow Treasure Trees that protect their moons from the Big Bad.

- Hanazuki (voiced by Jessica DiCicco) is the titular protagonist of the series. A newly born Moonflower, Hanazuki is a kind, friendly, cheerful and optimistic girl who always offers help to those who need it. She is quick to adapt to her role as her moon's guardian, allowing her to understand and control her own emotions more successfully than most other Moonflowers.
- Kiazuki (voiced by Cassandra Lee Morris) is an older and cynical Moonflower who lives on a moon ravaged by the Big Bad. Although claiming to be more experienced than Hanazuki, Kiazuki has failed to ever grow a colored Treasure Tree of her own, and envies Hanazuki's success. She thus manipulates Hanazuki, who admires her as her "Moonflower sister", into helping her acquire treasures to restore her moon. She is later revealed to be the founder of the Garlandians, a failed emergency response team devised to combat the Big Bad.
- Kiyoshi (voiced by Vargus Mason) is a male Moonflower who protects a moon inhabited by unicorns. Because of his pessimistic personality, he is only able to grow black Treasure Trees, which are ineffective in warding off the Big Bad. Deposed and exiled for his failures, Kiyoshi receives guidance from Hanazuki to properly harness his emotional powers, eventually regaining authority of his moon.
- Maroshi (voiced by Marcus Toji) is a Moonflower from an ocean-covered world that is frozen and shattered by the Big Bad. Despite losing his home, he maintains a positive, laid-back attitude at all times, which makes him easy for others to get along with, but also appearing somewhat irresponsible. He is talented at flying through space on a surfboard-like device.
- Miyumi (voiced by Elise Dubois) is an outgoing and confident Moonflower who is always sure about herself, despite not being mean. She can be irresponsible and self-centered since she prefers to enjoy herself. But in the end, she realized that she can be responsible since she learned her lesson.

=== Hemka ===
The Hemka (or Hemkas) are twelve small, rabbit-like creatures that inhabit Hanazuki's moon. They speak in gibberish that others except Hanazuki can fully understand, and they have malleable bodies that allow them to merge and change into different objects. Each Hemka is of a different color and represents a specific personality trait that Hanazuki reflects.

- Red Hemka (voiced by Colleen Villard) is a feisty Hemka prone to picking fights and pulling pranks on others. Red often acts as the leader of the other Hemkas.
- Orange Hemka (voiced by Michael Sinterniklaas) is a wacky Hemka who often jumps around and makes silly faces.
- Yellow Hemka (voiced by Colleen Villard) is a happy Hemka who enjoys playing and remains optimistic in dangerous situations.
- Lime Green Hemka (voiced by Jessica DiCicco) is a scared Hemka who is easily startled by anything.
- Green Hemka (voiced by Michael Sinterniklaas) is a mellow Hemka who speaks with a laid-back tone.
- Teal Hemka (voiced by Michael Sinterniklaas in season 1, Cassandra Lee Morris in the shorts) is a glamorous Hemka.
- Blue Hemka (voiced by Jessica DiCicco) is a sad Hemka who is constantly crying or on the verge of tears.
- Lavender Hemka (voiced by Michael Sinterniklaas) is an inspired Hemka who has creative ideas but is too shy to act on them.
- Purple Hemka (voiced by Michael Sinterniklaas) is a courageous Hemka who performs feats of derring-do.
- Pink Hemka (voiced by Michael Sinterniklaas) is a loving Hemka who shows affection for everything.
- Raspberry Hemka (voiced by Cassandra Lee Morris) is a Hemka that is supposed to represent Hope
- Emerald Hemka (voiced by Avery Waddell) is a Hemka that represents Jealousy

=== Unicorns ===
Unicorns in the series are native to Kiyoshi's moon. They possess the same colors and personality traits as the Hemka, with the additional ability to perform magic using their horns. Most unicorns in the series are voiced by Debi Derryberry.

- Sleepy Unicorn (voiced by Avery Waddell) is a unicorn who lives on Hanazuki's moon and, as his name suggests, spends most of his time sleeping. Despite his relaxed and lazy nature, he harbors a troubled past; originally named Noble Unicorn, he lives in exile from his home moon after failing to stop his brother Twisted Unicorn's revolt against Kiyoshi. Convinced that he is unfit to wield magic because of his failure, Sleepy regains his confidence to use his powers again to help Hanazuki.
- Twisted Unicorn (voiced by Avery Waddell) is Sleepy Unicorn's brother and the leader of the unicorns. Twisted is a tyrant responsible for overthrowing Kiyoshi, forcing his fellow unicorns to maintain a force field he professes will protect their moon from the Big Bad. He is eventually deposed by the combined efforts of Hanazuki, Kiyoshi, and their allies, leading Twisted to hunt them across the galaxy for revenge.

=== Slooths ===
Sloth-like creatures that live on Miyumi's moon. The others were voiced by Cassandra Lee Morris.

- BB (Elise Dubois) is Miyumi's favorite teal Slooth who likes everything fabulous just like her.

=== Others ===
- Little Dreamer (voiced by Colleen Villard) is Hanazuki's infant-like creator who delivers treasures to the Moonflowers. He is shown sleeping at all times and wearing different-patterned pajamas almost every time he appears.
- Dazzlessence Jones (voiced by Avery Waddell) is the self-appointed sheriff of Hanazuki's moon who resembles a diamond. He helps Hanazuki maintain order, and speaks verbose words through song.
- Zikoro (voiced by Avery Waddell) is Kiazuki's sole companion on her moon, a black creature who behaves like a restless dog. He is regularly mistreated by Kiazuki, but remains loyal to her and enjoys tormenting the Hemka. After Kiazuki abandons him on Hanazuki's moon, he takes more of a liking to Hanazuki and her friends.
- Chicken Plant (voiced by Alison Martin) is a grouchy plant with the resemblance of a chicken that constantly tries eating the Hemka. She is prone to laying eggs that hatch into destructive monsters.
- Mirror Plant (Shondalia White) is a plant that translates an individual's thoughts and repeats what the subject says.
- Mazzadril (both voiced by Michael Sinterniklaas) are one-eyed, four-legged beasts with horns on their heads and tentacles for mouths. Their natural habitat is the dark side of both Hanazuki's moon and Kiazuki's moon.
- Doughy Bunington (voiced by Pat Fraley) is a friendly gourmand hotdog who lives on the dark side of the moon, exiled there after thoughtlessly devouring Chicken Plant's wings.
- Basil Ganglia (voiced by Trevor Devall) is an egocentric, megalomaniacal brain who inhabits a cave on the moon's dark side. He has designs to take over Hanazuki's moon, but is helpless to carry them out due to his lack of other body parts.
- Flochi (both voiced by Nika Futterman) are the creatures that inhabit Maroshi's moon, resembling fish with catlike faces. They glide across any surface in unison, with the exception of a lavender Flochi aptly named Wanderer for her more independent nature.
- Axo (voiced by Gary Anthony Williams) is an axolotl who is the Bouncer of the Cube: the club in the Dark Side who only likes silliness.
- Enormous Coal (both voiced by Dino Andrade) are a coal like creature who lives in the Volcano of Fears who likes to brag about being big.
- Depriva (voiced by Jennifer Hale) is a flower on Hanazuki's moon who's so fabulous & likes to talk about it.
- Glow Worms (both voiced by Trevor Devall) are servants of Depriva.

== Development and production ==
The original concept of Hanazuki was first developed in 2005 as an independent toy line by Norwegian art director Niko Stumpo and his Dutch partner, Hanneke Metselaar, under the self-formed Hanazuki Company in the Netherlands. Hasbro purchased the rights to the Hanazuki brand in 2010, with The Hanazuki Company being rebranded Thisisarobot. By 2013, Hanazuki was being developed as an interactive game for children from ages 7 to 14, with a scheduled release date for Fall 2014. A preview of Hanazuki was included in the 2013 United States home media release of Hasbro Studios' My Little Pony: Equestria Girls. On January 10, 2017, Hasbro announced Hanazuki as a web series that would premiere on their YouTube channel on January 12.

== Release ==
Released beginning on January 12, 2017, on the property's official website and by Hasbro's official YouTube channel, the first season consists of 27 episodes, with the first 18 released in two sets of nine in accordance with the full moon of the lunar calendar. The remaining nine episodes were released weekly from May 19 to July 14, 2017. The series was available in multiple languages. In 2018, Hasbro has since de-listed all the full episodes off their YouTube channel following the decision to air the series via television networks. However, in 2024, this series returned to YouTube via Hasbro's own newly created YouTube channel HasTV Charm.

In Canada, Hanazuki: Full of Treasures aired as a sneak peek on January 28, 2017, on Teletoon, Cartoon Network, YTV, and Disney Channel, all operated by Corus Entertainment.

In the United States, Discovery Family began broadcasting the first season on December 1, 2018.

Originally, season 2 was supposed to be released in 2017, but was delayed to 2019 instead.

The series also made its debut on foreign TV channels such as Pop in the United Kingdom, eToonz in South Africa, and ABC ME in Australia. Hanazuki was shown on the Russian TV channel Carousel approximately in 2017–2018.

== Reception ==
=== Critical response and downfall cancellation during critical user moments ===
Hanazuki: Full of Treasures was met with critical praise and online popularity upon release, with several favorably comparing it to the television series My Little Pony: Friendship Is Magic (another Hasbro property) and Steven Universe for its light-hearted tone, visual aesthetic, and methodical storytelling. As of May 2017, the series has accumulated over 120 million views on YouTube. After Despite its creative success, Hanazuki suffered a complete structural collapse between 2018 and 2020, due to corporate friction and poor retail performance, and physical merchandise fail to catch on. The massive wave of blind-box figures overwhelmed parents, and the massive bankruptcy of Toys "R" Us–a major retail partner–severely crippled toy distribution.

In her review of the series, Lauren Orsini of Forbes commented on the involvement of Friendship Is Magic writer Dave Polsky as a story editor, considering Friendship Is Magic to be lucrative to Hasbro's success, and concluding that the series was an attempt by the company to incite similar success with Hanazuki. In a later article, Orsini attributed the series' popularity on YouTube to its "spunky characters and high production values". Mercedes Milligan of Animation Magazine said of the series, "Hanazuki puts a modern, cross-platform in 2000 Hasbro. bros. Corp. spin on a premise that will be familiar to '80s kids who grew up with Rainbow Brite, et al." Ella Anders of BSC Kids praised the opening episodes for its setting, lore, characters, and overarching storytelling. She additionally interpreted the series as a Western magical girl series that "doesn't play off the traditional magical girl path or tropes". Nathalie Medina of iDigitalTimes gave the series a score of 4 out of 5, complimenting the characters and hints of a more complex underlying story, and comparing its visual style to "a Lisa Frank folder with a 2000s aesthetic". Originally users on Reddit, point out that Hasbro severely mismanaged the franchise's distribution. They shifted the show off YouTube to television debut on Discovery Family, which immediately killed its organic internet viewership. Furthermore, Season 2 shorts were locked behind a UK-exclusive mobile app, and the full second season was chopped down to just eight episodes, airing with virtually zero promotion in 2019.

=== Awards and nominations ===
Award	Category	Recipient(s) and nominee(s)	Result	Ref(s)
Behind the Voice Actors Awards	Best Male Vocal Performance in a Television Series in a Supporting Role	Trevor Devall (as Basil Ganglia)	Nominated	
Behind the Voice Actors Awards	Best Female Vocal Performance in a Television Series in a Supporting Role	Alison Martin (as Chicken Plant)	Nominated	
Behind the Voice Actors Awards	Best Vocal Ensemble in a NEW Television Series	Jessica DiCicco, Colleen O'Shaughnessey, Michael Sinterniklaas, Cassandra Lee Morris, Avery Waddell, Vargus Mason, Danny DeVito, Marcus Toji, Elise DuBois, Alison Martin, Trevor Devall	Nominated	

== Other Media ==
The web series was made in conjunction with a line of Hanazuki toys first announced at the 2017 New York Toy Fair, which was launched in June that same year. A digital app for the series was released for iOS and Android on April 4, 2017, offering a tie-in interactive video game along with episodes of the web series. A companion book authored by Brandon T. Snider, titled Hanazuki: Book of Treasures – The Official Guide, was released on November 7, 2017. A series of four chapter books set within the universe of the web-series was also announced, with the first book written by Stacy Davidowitz, titled Hanazuki: A Spark in the Dark, released on May 8, 2018.
