= Trouble =

Trouble may refer to:

== Film and television ==
- Trouble (1922 film), an American silent comedy-drama film directed by Albert Austin
- Trouble (1933 film), a British comedy film
- Trouble (1977 film), a Soviet drama film
- Trouble (2017 film), an American comedy-drama film
- Trouble (2019 film), аn American animated family comedy film
- Trouble (2024 film), a Swedish action-comedy film
- Trouble (TV channel), a television station in the UK and Republic of Ireland

== Music ==
=== Albums ===
- Trouble (Akon album), 2004
- Trouble (Bonnie McKee album) or the title song, 2004
- Trouble (EXID album) or the title song, 2019
- Trouble (Gina Birch album), 2025
- Trouble (Matt Terry album) or the title song, 2017
- Trouble (Natalia Kills album) or the title song (see below), 2013
- Trouble (Ray LaMontagne album) or the title song (see below), 2004
- Trouble (Randy Rogers Band album), 2013
- Trouble (Sailor album), 1975
- Trouble (Totally Enormous Extinct Dinosaurs album) or the title song, 2012
- Trouble (Trouble album), 1990
- Trouble (Whitesnake album) or the title song, 1978
- Trouble: The Jamie Saft Trio Plays Bob Dylan, 2006
- T-R-O-U-B-L-E (album), by Travis Tritt, 1992
- Trouble (EP), by Ayumi Hamasaki, 2018
- Trouble, by Michael Sterling, 1990
- Trouble, by R3hab, 2017
- Trouble, by Trampled by Turtles, 2007

=== Songs ===
- "Trouble" (American Authors song), 2014
- "Trouble" (Bei Maejor song), 2011
- "Trouble" (Cage the Elephant song), 2016
- "Trouble" (Cat Stevens song), 1970
- "Trouble" (Chris Rene song), 2012
- "Trouble" (Coldplay song), 2000
- "Trouble" (Cypress Hill song), 2001
- "Trouble" (Elvis Presley song), 1958; covered by several artists (for the 1975 song, see below)
- "Trouble" (Eminem song), 2024
- "Trouble" (Flight Facilities song), 2024
- "Trouble" (Gloriana song), 2014
- "Trouble" (Heaven 17 song), 1987
- "Trouble" (Iggy Azalea song), 2015
- "Trouble" (Josh Ross song), 2023
- "Trouble" (Keith Richards song), 2015
- "Trouble" (Leona Lewis song), 2012
- "Trouble" (Lindsey Buckingham song), 1981
- "Trouble" (Natalia Kills song), 2013
- "Trouble" (Neon Jungle song), 2013
- "Trouble" (Never Shout Never song), 2008
- "Trouble" (Nia Peeples song), 1988
- "Trouble" (Pink song), 2003
- "Trouble" (Ray LaMontagne song), 2005
- "Trouble" (Shampoo song), 1994
- "Trouble" (Todd Snider song), 1994; covered by Mark Chesnutt, 1995
- "Trouble" (Vassy song), 2019
- "T-R-O-U-B-L-E" (song), by Elvis Presley, 1975; covered by Travis Tritt, 1992
- "She's Trouble", also known as "Trouble", by Michael Jackson, 1981 (released 2022); covered by Musical Youth, 1983
- "Ya Got Trouble", often credited as "Trouble", from the musical The Music Man, 1957
- "Trouble", by Ab-Soul featuring Aloe Blacc from Welcome to Los Santos, 2015
- "Trouble", by Bitter:Sweet from Drama, 2008
- "Trouble", by the Blizzards from A Public Display of Affection, 2006
- "Trouble", by Bob Dylan from Shot of Love, 1981
- "Trouble", by Britney Spears from Circus, 2008
- "Trouble", by Da Baby from Blame It on Baby, 2020
- "Trouble", by Dean Brody from Right Round Here, 2023
- "Trouble", by Exo from Obsession, 2019
- "Trouble", by Five Finger Death Punch from A Decade of Destruction, 2017
- "Trouble", by Frankie Miller from High Life, 1974
- "Trouble", by Freddie Jackson from Time for Love, 1992
- "Trouble", by Ginuwine from A Man's Thoughts, 2009
- "Trouble", by Halsey from Room 93, 2014
- "Trouble", by Imagine Dragons from Smoke + Mirrors, 2015
- "Trouble", by J. Cole from Born Sinner, 2013
- "Trouble", by Jay-Z from Kingdom Come, 2006
- "Trouble", by John Farnham from Whispering Jack, 1986
- "Trouble", by Kano from Hoodies All Summer, 2019
- "Trouble", by the Kingsmen from Up and Away, 1966
- "Trouble", by the Knocks from Testify, 2017
- "Trouble", by Liam Payne from LP1, 2019
- "Trouble", by Lisa Germano from Geek the Girl, 1994
- "Trouble", by Little Feat from Sailin' Shoes, 1972
- "Trouble", by Lizz Wright from Dreaming Wide Awake, 2005
- "Trouble", by Lost Frequencies, 2014
- "Trouble", by Mabel from High Expectations, 2019
- "Trouble", by Metronomy from The English Riviera, 2011
- "Trouble", by Nilüfer Yanya from Painless, 2022
- "Trouble", by Quiet Riot from Quiet Riot II, 1978
- "Trouble", by Rudimental and Sub Focus, 2017
- "Trouble", by Ryan Adams from Ryan Adams, 2014
- "Trouble", by Skindred from Roots Rock Riot, 2007
- "Trouble", by Sleeping with Sirens from Gossip, 2017
- "Trouble", by TooManyLeftHands, 2014
- "Trouble", by Troye Sivan and Jay Som, 2022
- "Trouble", by TV on the Radio from Seeds, 2014
- "Trouble", by Twice from Between 1&2, 2022
- "Trouble", by Warpaint from Radiate Like This, 2022
- "Trouble", by Willam Belli from The Wreckoning, 2012

=== Performers ===
- Trouble (band), an American doom metal band

== People ==
- Trouble (rapper) (1987–2022), American rapper
- Trouble T Roy (1967–1990), American hip-hop dancer with Heavy D and the Boyz
- Bruno Troublé (born 1945), French sailor in the 1968 and 1976 Olympics
- Keef Trouble (born 1949), English composer, singer and musician
- MC Trouble (1970–1991), first female rapper signed to Motown Records
- Melody "Trouble" Vixen, professional wrestler from the Gorgeous Ladies of Wrestling

== Other uses ==
- Trouble (board game), in which players race four pieces around a board
- Trouble (comics), a 2003 Marvel limited series
- Trouble (magazine), an Australian online monthly promoting visual and performing arts and culture
- Trouble (novel), a 2009 novel by Kate Christensen
- Trouble, a dog who inherited a $12 million trust from Leona Helmsley
- Trouble, Eddy's pet cougar from the cartoon Ed, Edd n Eddy

== See also ==
- Deep Trouble (disambiguation)
- Double Trouble (disambiguation)
- Troubles (disambiguation)
