= Double bubble =

Double bubble may refer to:

== Mathematics and computer science ==
- Double bubble theorem, that the minimum surface surrounding two given volumes is formed by three spherical patches meeting at a common circle, and the "standard double bubble", the name for this surface
- Double bubble map, a graphical information visualization technique
- Double bubble sort, a variation of the bubble sort algorithm

== Biology and medicine ==
- Double bubble (radiology), a symptom of a bowel obstruction formed by two air-filled bubbles in the abdomen
- Double bubble mint, a plant native to the southwestern US

== Music and entertainment ==
- "Double Bubble", a track on jazz-fusion music album Southern Comfort (The Crusaders album)
- "Double Bubble", an episode of British medical television drama Holby City (series 14).
- "Double Bubble", an episode of animated television series The Little Mermaid
- "Double Bubble", an episode of American medical television drama Trapper John, M.D.
- Double Bubble (2008), a hip hop/electronic dance music album by Stereo MCs
- "The Double Bubble Duchess", one of the songs in Charlie and the Chocolate Factory (musical)
- "Double Bubble Trouble", a song by M.I.A.
- "Double Bubble", a short story by Alistair Fruish, included in his novel Kiss My ASBO

== Other ==
- Double bubble roof, a design feature of some automobiles including the Fiat-Abarth 750 Zagato "Double Bubble"
- Dubble Bubble bubble gum
- Double Bubble, a commonly-offered bonus payout in Bingo in the United Kingdom
- Double Bubble, a style of Reebok Freestyle shoes
- The Aurora D8 aeroplane concept, nicknamed the "double bubble" for its shape
- Double bubble nebula, in astronomy, planetary nebula NGC 2371-2 in Gemini

== See also ==
- Double-double (disambiguation)
- Fermi bubble, a large double bubble structure of plasma above and below the plane of the Milky Way galaxy.
