= Double-double (disambiguation) =

A double-double refers to a basketball achievement where a player accumulates double digits in two of a certain five statistical categories in a single game.

It may also refer to:

== Sports and games ==
- Double-double, in volleyball, where a player accumulates double digits in two of five categories in a match
- Double Double Bonus, a variation of video poker
- The double salto backward tucked with 2/1 turn, a skill in men's and women's artistic gymnastics

== Food and drink ==
- Double-Double, a cheeseburger with two patties and two slices of cheese from In-N-Out Burger
- Double-double, a coffee with two creams and two sugars from Tim Hortons

== Science and technology ==
- Double-double arithmetic, a software technique for attaining higher precision floating-point arithmetic by representing each number using a pair of double-precision numbers
- The Double Double, in astronomy, the quadruple star system Epsilon Lyrae

== Literature and media ==
- Double, Double (Brunner novel), a 1969 science fiction novel by John Brunner
- Double, Double (Ellery Queen novel), a 1950 mystery novel
- Double, Double (Star Trek novel), a 1989 science fiction novel
- Double Double: A Memoir of Alcoholism by Martha Grimes and Ken Grimes
- "Double, double toil and trouble", a line spoken by the Three Witches in Shakespeare's Macbeth
- Double, Double, Toil and Trouble, a 1993 children's film

== Other ==
- A doubled set of double yellow lines, used in some parts of the US to indicate a painted median strip and called "double-double yellow lines"

== See also ==
- Double dabble
- Daily double (disambiguation)
- Double bubble (disambiguation)
- Double Trouble (disambiguation)
