= Triple Trouble =

Triple Trouble may refer to:

- Triple Trouble (1918 film), starring Charlie Chaplin
- Triple Trouble (1950 film), a Bowery Boys film
- 3pol Trobol: Huli Ka Balbon!, a 2019 Philippine film
- "Triple Trouble" (song), by the Beastie Boys
- Sonic the Hedgehog: Triple Trouble, a video game starring Sonic the Hedgehog

== See also ==
- Double Trouble (disambiguation)
