= Double Trouble =

Double Trouble may refer to:

== Places ==
- Double Trouble State Park, New Jersey

== Film and TV ==
=== Film ===
- Double Trouble (1915 film), a silent film starring Douglas Fairbanks, Sr
- Double Trouble (1927 film), a silent film starring Snub Pollard
- Double Trouble (1941 film), featuring Richard Cramer
- Double Trouble (1951 film), a docu-drama directed by Lee Robinson
- Double Trouble (1967 film), starring Elvis Presley
- Double Trouble (1984 film), an Italian action comedy starring Terence Hill and Bud Spencer
- Double Trouble (1984 Hong Kong film), starring Eric Tsang
- Double Trouble (1992 film), starring the Barbarian Brothers, Peter and David Paul
- Double Trouble (2012 film), a Taiwanese action-comedy film starring Jaycee Chan
- Sandwich: Double Trouble, a 2006 Indian comedy starring Govinda

=== Television ===
==== Series ====
- Double Trouble (Australian TV series), a 2008 children's series
- Double Trouble (American TV series), a 1980s teen sitcom

==== Episodes ====
- "Double Trouble" (The Adventures of Sinbad), 1996
- "Double Trouble" (Adventures of Superman), 1953
- "Double Trouble" (Archer), 2011
- "Double Trouble" (Code Lyoko), 2006
- "Double Trouble" (Dexter's Laboratory), 1996
- "Double Trouble" (Full House), 1991
- "Double Trouble" (H2O: Just Add Water), 2008
- "Double Trouble" (Hanazuki: Full of Treasures), 2017
- "Double Trouble" (He-Man and the Masters of the Universe), 1984
- "Double Trouble" (The Jeffersons), 1983
- "Double Trouble" (Keeping Up with the Kardashians), 2009
- "Double Trouble" (The Littlest Hobo), 1979
- "Double Trouble" (The Loud House), 2022
- "Double Trouble" (Mr Bean: The Animated Series), 2004
- "Double Trouble" (Nash Bridges), 2000
- "Double Trouble" (The New Adventures of Zorro), 1981
- "Double Trouble" (Ninjago: Masters of Spinjitzu), 2012
- "Double Trouble" (Odd Squad), 2014
- "Double Trouble" (One on One), 2006
- "Double Trouble" (Orange Is the New Black), 2018
- "Double Trouble" (The Partridge Family), 1973
- "Double Trouble" (Pawn Stars), 2010
- "Double Trouble" (Phil of the Future), 2005
- "Double Trouble" (Pocoyo), 2007
- "Double Trouble" (Sailor Moon), 1995
- "Double Trouble" (Shaun the Sheep), 2009
- "Double Trouble" (Shimmer and Shine), 2016
- "Double Trouble" (The Six Million Dollar Man), 1976
- "Double Trouble" (Teen Titans Go!), 2013
- "Double Trouble" (Thomas and Friends), 1986
- "Double Trouble" (Three's Company), 1981
- "Double Trouble", an episode of The Ghosts of Motley Hall, 1976
- "Double Trouble", an episode of Kidd Video, 1985
- "Double Trouble", an episode of The Mighty Hercules
- "Double Trouble", an episode of Shining Time Station, 1991

== Toys and games ==
- Double Trouble (FIRST), a game for the 1999 FIRST Robotics competition
- Double Trouble (She-Ra), a character from the toyline She-Ra: Princess of Power and the She-Ra and the Princesses of Power animated series
- Robbery Bob 2: Double Trouble, a 2015 video game for iOS and the sequel to Robbery Bob
- Viewtiful Joe: Double Trouble!, a 2005 video game for the Nintendo DS
- Double Trouble, a playable character in the Skylanders video game franchise

== People ==
- Doubble Troubble, an American juggling duo
- Double Trouble, lesser known name for professional wrestling tag-team Rhythm and Blues
- Double Trouble, a later name for The Undertakers a professional wrestling Jobber tag-team

== Literature ==
- Double Trouble (The Hardy Boys), a 2008 novel
- Double Trouble (manga), a 2002 Japanese manga by Takashi Kanzaki
- Double Trouble (book), by Muhammad Younis Butt
- Double Trouble, a Nintendo gamebook
- "Double Trouble", a comic strip in the 1987 British comic book Nipper
- Gerome McKenna, also known as Double Trouble, a fictional character in the DC Comics team Infinity, Inc.
- Double Trouble, a fictional character in the Marvel Comics group Weapon P.R.I.M.E.

== Music ==
=== Performers and producers ===
- Double Trouble (band), the backing band of blues guitarist Stevie Ray Vaughan and of guitarist James D. Lane
- Double Trouble (dance music producers), a UK dance group from the late 1980s and early 1990s
- Double Trouble (hip hop group), a hip hop duo consisting of Rodney Cee & KK Rockwell, which appear on the Wild Style Original Soundtrack
- Double Trouble, later Friends, a 1980s Dutch band featuring Carola Smit
- Double Trouble Productions, a studio operated by Michael Wagener

=== Albums ===
- Double Trouble (soundtrack), the soundtrack by Elvis Presley from the 1967 film (see above)
- Double Trouble (Frankie Miller album)
- Double Trouble (George Jones and Johnny Paycheck album), 1980
- Double Trouble (Gillan album), 1981
- Double Trouble (Barry Guy and the London Jazz Composers' Orchestra album), 1990
- Double Trouble (P-Square album), 2014

=== Songs ===
- "Double Trouble", lyrics by Leo Robin, music by Richard A. Whiting and Ralph Rainger, 1935
- "Double Trouble" (The Cars song), 1987
- "Double Trouble" (Jacky Cheung song), 2010
- "Double Trouble" (Lynyrd Skynyrd song), 1975
- "Double Trouble" (Otis Rush song), 1958
- "Double Trouble" (Will Ferrell and My Marianne song), from the 2020 film Eurovision Song Contest: The Story of Fire Saga
- "Double Trouble", by Francesca & Mikaela
- "Double Trouble", by The Roots from Things Fall Apart
- "Double Trouble", from the Harry Potter and the Prisoner of Azkaban film soundtrack album
- "Double Trouble (Team Rocket)", from the Pokémon soundtrack album Pokémon 2.B.A. Master

== See also ==
- Deep Trouble (disambiguation)
- Double-double (disambiguation)
- Triple Trouble (disambiguation)
- Trouble (disambiguation)
- Motu Patlu in Double Trouble, an Indian animated film based on the TV series Motu Patlu
