= List of Mr. Bean: The Animated Series episodes =

TV series episode list

This is a list of episodes of Mr. Bean: The Animated Series, a British animated comedy television series produced by Tiger Aspect Productions for ITV and CITV and based on the original live-action sitcom of the same name created by and starring Rowan Atkinson as the title character. It premiered on 2 March 2002 and originally ended on 1 November 2004.

On 22 January 2014, it was announced that the sitcom was being revived for a second series, with Atkinson and other cast members reprising their roles. It consisted of 52 new episodes and premiered on 16 February 2015.

On 6 February 2018, a third series was announced, featuring 26 episodes, which premiered on 9 April 2019 on CITV as well as on Turner channels worldwide in the following months.

On 4 January 2024, it was announced that the sitcom was renewed for the fourth series to mark the 35th anniversary of the first live-action episode. It consisted of 52 new episodes and premiered on 1 May 2025.

== Series overview ==
Series	Episodes	Originally released	
Series	Episodes	First released	Last released
1	52	2 March 2002	1 November 2004
2	52	16 February 2015	10 March 2016
Special		30 October 2018	
3	26	9 April 2019	8 October 2019
4	52	1 May 2025	18 September 2026

== Episodes ==
=== Series 1 (2002–2004) ===
No. overall	No. in series	Title	Directed by	Written by	Storyboarded by	Original release date
1	1	"In The Wild"	Richard Purdum	Robin Driscoll	Richard Purdum	2 March 2002
Mr Bean aspires to become a wildlife photographer after seeing one on TV and travels to the countryside to discover the flora and fauna. But he faces problems in his quest to photograph animals, especially when he takes unusual steps to achieve his goal.
2	2	"Missing Teddy"	Miklós Varga	Robin Driscoll	Katalin Bross	2 March 2002
Teddy is stolen by a pair of burglars who have been stealing teddy bears around London. After being tricked by them with a fake, Mr Bean seeks to find his friend and soon discovers the burglars' reason for the thefts and safely returns the teddy bears to their owners.
3	3	"Artful Bean"	Katalin Móré	Robin Driscoll	Dean Roberts	9 March 2002
Mr Bean is inspired by a street artist to make his own artwork to sell. He 'paints' a picture using various food items, which soon attract unwelcome pests.
4	4	"The Fly"	Katalin Móré	Jon Canter	Trevor Ricketts	9 March 2002
On a very hot summer night, a fly goes into Mr Bean's flat through the open window, keeping him awake. After Bean makes several failed attempts to kill the fly, he accidentally wakes Mrs Wicket, making her furious, and he is forced to sleep outside in the fridge as a punishment.
5	5	"No Parking"	Katalin Móré	Jon Canter	Dean Roberts	16 March 2002
Mr. Bean is eager to go to the cinema to watch Titanic, but has serious trouble finding a parking space. In his quest to search for a free space, he finds himself dealing with the traffic warden, excessive traffic and other problems.
6	6	"Bean's Bounty"	Katalin Móré	Robin Driscoll	Trevor Ricketts	16 March 2002
Whilst digging for buried treasure, Mr Bean digs himself a hole too deep to get out of.
7	7	"Mime Games"	Miklós Varga	Robin Driscoll	Trevor Ricketts	23 March 2002
Mr Bean has the misfortune of meeting an angry mime who follows him home. The pantomime asks him to take him in and feed him.
8	8	"Spring Clean"	Miklós Varga	Robin Driscoll	Miklós Varga	23 March 2002
Mr. Bean's room is a mess, so he decides to give his flat a spring clean.
9	9	"No Pets"	Miklós Varga	Robin Driscoll	Miklós Varga	1 April 2002
Seeing a man was having fun with his dog at the park, Mr. Bean decides to adopt a pet while avoiding Mrs. Wicket as she prohibited a pet at her place.
10	10	"Ray of Sunshine"	Miklós Varga	Robin Driscoll	Andrei Kolpin	1 April 2002
Mr. Bean is frustrated by overcrowding during a trip to the beach.
11	11	"Birthday Bear"	Mihály Sikur	Stephen Powell	Chris Butler	13 April 2002
Mr. Bean decides to throw a birthday party for his and Irma's teddy bear, before the grand ending he specifically prepared for everybody.
12	12	"The Mole"	Miklós Varga	Robin Driscoll	Arna Selznick	13 April 2002
Mrs. Wicket and Miss Wince are having a nice afternoon playing games at the backyard, before getting interrupted by a mole. It's up to Mr. Bean to get rid of it.
13	13	"Roadworks"	Andrei Ignatenko	Lee Cornes	Chris Butler	20 April 2002
Annoyed by the loud noise caused by the ongoing construction outside his residence, Mr Bean comes up with a number of ways to stop the disturbance.
14	14	"The Sofa"	Miklós Varga	Andrew Clifford	Andrei Kolpin	20 April 2002
Mr. Bean's sofa got ripped so he has to buy a new one.
15	15	"Nurse!"	Evgueni Pavlenko & Elena Rogova	Rebecca Stevens	Trevor Ricketts	7 June 2003
After seeing Mrs. Wicket getting treated well at hospital, Mr. Bean fakes an injury.
16	16	"Dead Cat"	Miklós Varga	Gary Parker	Ben Lewis	7 June 2003
As Mr. Bean tries to redecorate the hall, he is sabotaged at every step by Scrapper, the cat. Mr. Bean thinks it is time to make short work of the animal and gets rid of him.
17	17	"Gadget Kid"	Miklós Varga	Gary Parker	Ben Lewis	14 June 2003
Mr. Bean is exploring at the museum when he comes across a kid from Japan who happens to be a tech wiz.
18	18	"The Visitor"	Ildikó Táborita	Robin Driscoll	Sharon Smith	14 June 2003
Mr. Bean is visited by an old school friend.
19	19	"Royal Bean"	Evgueni Pavlenko & Elena Rogova	Rebecca Stevens	Chris Butler	21 June 2003
When Mr. Bean's royal mug is broken, he has to get a replacement and stopped by at the Buckingham Palace.
20	20	"Young Bean"	Evgueni Pavlenko & Elena Rogova	Tony Haase	Sharon Smith	21 June 2003
Mr. Bean tries to steal a chocolate cake Mrs. Wicket has baked and hides himself in the attic and looked at some his things when he was young.
21	21	"Goldfish"	Katalin Móré	Andrew Clifford	Chris Drew	28 June 2003
Mr. Bean is hanging out with a pet goldfish while Teddy has to get cleaned after getting coated in smelly sardines.
22	22	"Inventor"	Mihály Sikur	Tony Haase	Ben Lewis	28 June 2003
Mr. Bean is very upset when an inventor is invited to the flat and uses multiple gadgets to impress Mrs. Wicket.
23	23	"Car Trouble"	Mihály Sikur	Lee Cornes	David Brown	5 July 2003
Mr. Bean's Mini is malfunctional and he has to make a hot air balloon from scratch while the mechanic tricks Bean into thinking his Mini had to get destroyed by "fixing" it.
24	24	"Restaurant"	Sergey Gordeev	Lee Cornes	David Brown	5 July 2003
Getting prepared for a birthday, Mr. Bean goes to a restaurant.
25	25	"Hot Date"	Sergey Gordeev	Rebecca Stevens	Chris Butler	12 July 2003
Mr. Bean and Irma go on a date, they both have different tastes about what makes a date. First they have ice-cream, then they see a film, and then have dinner at a restaurant. Bean realises that he left his wallet at home so he goes to get it, but the musician uses his own 20 pounds to pay the bill and goes to have a romantic dance with Irma. So Bean has to stop the musician from stealing his girlfriend.
26	26	"Wanted"	Ildikó Táborita	Stephen Powell	Chris Butler	12 July 2003
A criminal, whose face resembles Mr. Bean, escapes and hides in the flat only for the real Bean to get arrested.
27	27	"Big TV"	Andrei Ignatenko	Tony Haase	Trevor Ricketts	16 August 2003
Mr. Bean wanted to get a bigger television as a replacement after it got broke due to an argument with Irma by changing a lot of channels.
28	28	"Keyboard Capers"	Andrei Ignatenko & Mihály Sikur	Mark Clompus	Chris Butler	16 August 2003
Mr. Bean bought a grand piano to play a song by Beethoven realising he did not play the right notes every time.
29	29	"Camping"	Mihály Sikur	Tony Haase	Sharon Smith	23 August 2003
Mr. Bean is going on a camping trip and somehow tried to find a place to stay without any problems.
30	30	"Chocks Away"	Andrei Ignatenko	Lee Cornes	Chris Butler	23 August 2003
When Bruiser Jr. is playing with a toy plane, Mr. Bean has to buy one as revenge until the boy's father broke it on purpose with Teddy still on board.
31	31	"Super Trolley"	Sergey Gordeev & Andrei Ignatenko	Lee Cornes	Sharon Smith	30 August 2003
Mr. Bean is going grocery shopping since he and Teddy had a bunch of Pop cereal toys with Bean only having one.
32	32	"Magpie"	Miklós Varga	Tony Haase	David Brown	30 August 2003
A magpie is injured and Mr. Bean has to take care of it. Meanwhile, the bird is stealing jewellery, including Wickett's necklace pendant and the Queen's crown.
33	33	"Cat-Sitting"	Andrei Ignatenko & Vladimir Nikitin	Stephen Powell	Sharon Smith	5 October 2004
Mr. Bean got fed up when he was taking care of Scrapper after his owner got injured badly by him.
34	34	"The Bottle"	Miklós Varga	Lee Cornes	Chris Butler	6 October 2004
Mr. Bean buys a ship in a bottle, but the milkman unknowingly collects it after he accidentally picks up an empty milk bottle in its place, and he breaks into the milk factory to retrieve it.
35	35	"Art Thief"	Katalin Móré	Rebecca Stevens	Trevor Ricketts	7 October 2004
An art thief was on the loose when he tried to steal a portrait of the flowers and the vase and Mr. Bean thought he stole it because the curator actually took it for cleaning.
36	36	"Scaredy Bean"	Miklós Varga	Jon Canter	Sharon Smith	8 October 2004
Mr. Bean runs into a selection of movies. He finds in his dreams that he seeks help from Mr. Tiny to defeat the villains.
37	37	"Bean in Love"	Katalin Móré	Tony Haase	Chris Butler	11 October 2004
Mr. Bean was going to a concert of his favourite hot singer for an autograph until he got blocked by her bodyguards.
38	38	"Double Trouble"	Zhenia Pavlenko & Elena Rogova	Robin Driscoll	Sharon Smith	12 October 2004
When Mr. Bean was walking at the park, he met a body double goes by the name, "Mr. Pod", who even has a plush penguin. Meanwhile, Irma was not impressed that she had to go on a date with two Beans at the same time with Pod as the Third Wheel.
39	39	"Hopping Mad!"	Andrei Ignatenko	Lee Cornes	Chris Drew	13 October 2004
Mr. Bean brought home frog eggs at his flat to take care of them until they have grown into a really mature one that causes mayhem in the flat.
40	40	"A Grand Invitation"	Andrei Ignatenko & Igor Veichtaguin	Gary Parker	Trevor Ricketts	14 October 2004
While Mr. Bean was going inside the Palace after he saved the dog from those people, he was having a good time until he got scammed as the Reliant Regal he fought earlier was on the same spot while driving away.
41	41	"A Royal Makeover"	Katalin Móré	Robin Driscoll	Chris Drew	15 October 2004
Mr. Bean redecorates his room, making it fit for a queen, and goes too far when he names it "The Palace". Mrs. Wicket, seeing this as an opportunity to gain money due to lack of funds to pay her bill from earlier, becomes the queen and makes Mr. Bean her slave, until he gets fed up with it and exposes Mrs. Wicket for the fraud she is.
42	42	"SuperMarrow"	Sergey Gordeev	Jon Canter	Ben Lewis	18 October 2004
The Bruisers and Mr. Bean both try to grow the heaviest marrow for a contest. Bean grows the heavier marrow by using UV lamps, but the Bruisers sneakily swap it with theirs. This backfires as the marrow is destroyed by caterpillars, which the Bruisers themselves had put there.
43	43	"A Running Battle"	Mihály Sikur & Mikhail Tumelia	Jon Canter	Chris Drew	19 October 2004
The running marathon was held and Mr. Bean participated there as his fat rival Goddawin joined there.
44	44	"Egg and Bean"	Sergey Gordeev & Mikhail Tumeli	Lee Cornes	Sharon Smith	20 October 2004
Mr. Bean has to take care of a baby bird while trying to cook some food for himself.
45	45	"Haircut"	Sergey Gordeev	Jon Canter	Sharon Smith	21 October 2004
Unable to get himself into a perfect shape for a photoshoot, Mr. Bean needs a haircut to look perfect. He becomes bald and uses a cat as a replacement, which becomes a new hairstyle for people.
46	46	"Neighbourly Bean"	Miklós Varga	Stephen Powell	Sharon Smith	22 October 2004
The Bruisers are usually causing a lot of interruptions with noises as Mr. Bean did not watch his clown show comfortably until he got revenge for missing out by recording the same noises from the neighbours.
47	47	"The Ball"	Mihály Sikur	Jon Canter	Ben Lewis	25 October 2004
The Bruisers are playing tennis as the ball went up on the roof and the father told Mr. Bean to get it back, only to find out how high it was.
48	48	"Toothache"	Katalin Móré	Lee Cornes	Chris Drew	26 October 2004
Mr. Bean was having a bad toothache every time he needed to get the pain away by going to the dentist.
49	49	"In The Pink"	Katalin Móré	Robin Driscoll	Chris Drew	27 October 2004
The thieves dyed the possums pink while Mr. Bean tries to stop the two from doing it.
50	50	"Dinner for Two"	Andrei Ignatenko	Jon Canter	Trevor Ricketts	28 October 2004
Mr. Bean tried to cook the perfect dinner for his date with Irma but his attempts became disastrous.
51	51	"Treasure!"	Katalin Móré	Tony Haase	Trevor Ricketts	29 October 2004
Mr. Bean was assembling a puzzle picture of a toy store as he goes on a treasure hunt to find the last piece.
52	52	"Homeless"	Andrei Ignatenko	Robin Driscoll	Sharon Smith	1 November 2004
Mr. Bean is kicked out of his flat when Mrs. Wicket misinterprets Bean being hidden under a blanket.

=== Series 2 (2015–2016) ===
Following a 10-year hiatus, a second series consisting of 52 episodes began broadcasting on 16 February 2015. This series was produced in honour of the 25th anniversary of the franchise.

No. overall	No. in series	Title	Directed by	Written by	Storyboarded by	Original release date
53	1	"Home Movie"	Tim Fehrenbach	Tony Haase	Trevor Ricketts & Bill Elliott	16 February 2015
When Mr. Bean learns about how people who make films get famous, he decides to create his own horror movie.
54	2	"Fish Sitting"	Tim Fehrenbach	Robin Driscoll	Benedict Bowen & Bill Elliott	16 February 2015
Bean has to look after Mrs. Wicket's goldfish whilst she is away. However, there is a problem: Scrapper eats fish, so chaos occurs with the fish, Bean and Scrapper. (derived from "Cat-Sitting" of Series 1).
55	3	"The Cruise"	Tim Fehrenbach	Tony Haase	Sharon Smith & Bill Elliott	17 February 2015
Mr Bean wins two tickets for him and Teddy to go on a luxury cruise holiday, but he accidentally falls over the ship into the sea while showing off to a new friend, then reaches a desert island and tries to survive there.
56	4	"Coconut Shy"	Tim Fehrenbach	Ciaran Murtagh & Andrew Jones	Benedict Bowen & Bill Elliott	17 February 2015
Mr. Bean is eager to get a new cup for Teddy, but has no money to buy one. Seeing a poster for a funfair that offers cash prizes at a coconut shy, Bean tries to win, only to discover it is a scam.
57	5	"Green Bean"	Tim Fehrenbach	Robin Driscoll	Sharon Smith & Bill Elliott	18 February 2015
Mrs. Wicket switches off Mr. Bean's electricity when she finds he is using too much. Bean builds a wind turbine, but a strong wind overloads the system, overvolting both Bean's and Wicket's appliances.
58	6	"Cash Machine"	Tim Fehrenbach	Ciaran Murtagh & Andrew Jones	Michelle Dabbs, Peter Mays & Bill Elliott	18 February 2015
Mr. Bean wants to buy a fancy cupcake, but needs to use a cash machine. After his PIN is rejected and the machine swallows his card, he breaks in to retrieve it before he realises he was reading the handwritten note of his PIN upside down.
59	7	"Litterbugs"	Tim Fehrenbach	Robin Driscoll	Jean-Paul Vermeulen & Bill Elliott	19 February 2015
Mr Bean, upset with litter being thrown everywhere, takes matters into his own hands and starts tidying up the streets. However, he becomes frustrated when no one wants to cooperate.
60	8	"Rat Trap"	Tim Fehrenbach	Robin Driscoll	Sharon Smith & Bill Elliott	19 February 2015
Mr. Bean has a rat in his house. His only idea to get rid of the rat is to do like the Pied Piper of Hamelin, but is then surrounded and pursued by a herd of rats.
61	9	"Valentine's Bean"	Tim Fehrenbach	Robin Driscoll	Jean-Paul Vermeulen & Bill Elliott	20 February 2015
Mr. Bean is with Irma on Valentine's Day, but his idea of romance is not exactly what his girlfriend prefers. When Declan begins wooing her at a funfair, Bean is eager to prove himself by winning a prize at a raffle.
62	10	"All You Can Eat"	Tim Fehrenbach	Ciaran Murtagh & Andrew Jones	Michelle Dabbs, Peter Mays & Bill Elliott	20 February 2015
Irma is coming for dinner, but Mr. Bean has forgotten about it and has no food for her. So he visits the supermarket, where he soon enters a pie-eating contest that offers the winner's shopping for free.
63	11	"Flat Pack"	Tim Fehrenbach	Ciaran Murtagh & Andrew Jones	Paul Stone, Isabel Castellano & Bill Elliott	23 February 2015
When Mr. Bean's bookcase collapses, he decides to buy a new one. To his surprise and annoyance, he learns he must assemble it himself, which seems easy enough, until he realises he is missing one screw.
64	12	"Holiday For Teddy"	Tim Fehrenbach	Tony Haase	Benedict Bowen & Bill Elliott	24 February 2015
Bean and Teddy go on holiday to the seaside, but he gets distracted by a spoiled little girl who wants Teddy all to herself.
65	13	"The Newspaper"	Tim Fehrenbach	Robin Driscoll	Paul Stone, Isabel Castellano & Bill Elliott	25 February 2015
While Mrs. Wicket is away for a few days, the newspaper is being stolen from the letterbox every day. Eager to solve the mystery, Mr. Bean sets to work trying to catch the thief in the act.
66	14	"Viral Bean"	Tim Fehrenbach	Alex Collier	Trevor Ricketts & Bill Elliott	4 September 2015
At the library, Mr. Bean takes an interest in online videos, and decides to make his own. After being ejected from the library for making too much noise, Bean accidentally records himself hitting a nearby post. The video goes viral, and makes him an overnight celebrity.
67	15	"Super Spy"	Tim Fehrenbach	Tony Haase	Richard Bazley & Bill Elliott	4 September 2015
Fascinated by his favourite TV programme, Super Spy, Mr. Bean decides to become a spy himself and acquires a spying kit. Through his spying, he becomes suspicious of the Bruisers and follows them, fearing they plan to do something criminal.
68	16	"Scout Bean"	Tim Fehrenbach	Jimmy Hibbert	Sharon Smith & Bill Elliott	4 September 2015
When Irma's scout master is disabled, Mr. Bean unwittingly becomes the substitute scout master to take care of Irma and her scouts. Unfortunately, Bean's obsession with badge-collecting only makes the scouts unhappy.
69	17	"Back to School"	Tim Fehrenbach	Ciaran Murtagh & Andrew Jones	Richard Bazley & Bill Elliott	4 September 2015
Mr. Bean is mistaken for a new teacher when parks at a school to buy some milk. He soon finds himself placed in charge of a class of young juvenile delinquents, prompting him to teach them a lesson in good manners and behaviour.
70	18	"Lord Bean"	Tim Fehrenbach	Ciaran Murtagh & Andrew Jones	Mark Marren & Bill Elliott	4 September 2015
While drawing a family tree of kings at the library, an old lady tells Mr. Bean that he looks like a king named Lord Bean in the book she is reading. Bean heads to Scotland where Lord Bean's castle is located in order to explore; servants there mistake him for Lord Bean. There, he accidentally discovers the secret places and as he finds the real identical Lord Bean, he gets him out.
71	19	"Car Wars"	Tim Fehrenbach	Robin Driscoll	Trevor Ricketts & Bill Elliott	7 September 2015
After yet another run-in with Mr. Bean of the usual kind, the Reliant Supervan finally takes revenge on Bean by making him slam his Mini into a lorry full of fragile goods and fall into a pond in the park. That night, Bean is chased in his Mini by the Reliant to a scrapyard, where the driver sneaks out of the Reliant and crushes his Mini into a cube. The next day, Bean brings the remains of his Mini to a garage to have it rebuilt.
72	20	"Wedding Day"	Tim Fehrenbach	Ciaran Murtagh & Andrew Jones	Michelle Dabbs, Peter Mays & Bill Elliott	8 September 2015
While Mr. Bean is shopping for flowers for Irma's birthday, a wedding car crashes into a lamppost, resulting in Bean coming to the rescue and offering the bride a lift to the wedding venue. While doing so, Irma comes on his way and Bean ignores her birthday deal, making an angry Irma chase him around town, believing he is being unfaithful. Bean manages to bring the bride on time and after the wedding, the bride throws the flower and Irma catches it. Note: This episode is related to Series 1's Young Bean and similar to Double Trouble from Series 1 as well.
73	21	"Bean Phone"	Tim Fehrenbach	Ciaran Murtagh & Andrew Jones	Les Eaves & Bill Elliott	9 September 2015
After meeting a man with a smartphone, Mr. Bean decides he wants one himself, but cannot afford one. Instead, he makes a smartphone-like object; a large rucksack with smartphone "applications". To test the navigation features of Bean's rucksack versus his smartphone, the man races Bean to Tower Bridge.
74	22	"Hotel Bean"	Tim Fehrenbach	Tony Haase	Richard Bazley & Bill Elliott	10 September 2015
Mr. Bean sniffs his flowers outside of the window and suddenly two Japanese guest stopped at his flat mistaken it as a hotel. Both of them knocked at the door and Mr. Bean opens it and one of them start speaking to Mr. Bean in Japanese, Mr. Bean starts to get very confused because he doesn't understand what they are saying. He show Mr. Bean a flyer (that looks exactly like he and Mrs. Wicket's flat except for the two doors) and he finally understands what they mean. Mr. Bean was about to tell them that they went to the wrong place but when he was about to say it, The Guest shows him his money and he welcomes them. Confused Mrs. Wicket ask Mr. Bean what is going on and he tells her to pretend that their flat is an actual hotel.
75	23	"Jurassic Bean"	Tim Fehrenbach	Robin Driscoll	Leigh Fieldhouse & Bill Elliott	11 September 2015
While taking photos of wildlife, Mr. Bean finds big dinosaur footprints on the ground, and begins to flee, but then has an idea to take a photo of it in the hopes of becoming famous. However, the dinosaur turns out to be part of a set for a movie called Jurassic Hero, in which Bean becomes the star.
76	24	"Caring Bean"	Tim Fehrenbach	Alex Collier	Paul Stone, Isabel Castellano & Bill Elliott	14 September 2015
When Mrs. Wicket is accidentally disabled by Mr. Bean's toy car, Bean takes care of her, but it only messes him up when Mrs. Wicket calls him by ringing the bell unexpectedly. When Scrapper messes up Bean's kitchen, he becomes a slave to her until he gets fed up with this. While Mrs. Wicket is asleep, Bean in retaliation puts his toy cars under her chair, controls it and Mrs. Wicket ends up trapped in the shed.
77	25	"Opera Bean"	Tim Fehrenbach	Jimmy Hibbert	Richard Bazley & Bill Elliott	15 September 2015
Mr. Bean is running late for a date with Irma to watch the opera. To make matters worse, his car breaks down. He eventually fixes it and makes it to the opera. However, because he got oil on his clothes while fixing his car, he is refused entry. He goes to a nearby laundrette to get his clothes cleaned, but due to the amount of the time it would take, he runs naked to an alleyway outside the building where he finds a pink opera dress and decides to wear it. He left his ticket in his clothing that is being washed, so he sneaks into the backstage. He finds a wig and heels and tries them on, but then he ends up on the stage where he has no choice but to perform. Although the performance ends successfully, he loses his wig and blows his cover. Note: The song performed is "O mio babbino caro".
78	26	"Taxi Bean"	Tim Fehrenbach	Ciaran Murtagh & Andrew Jones	Les Eaves & Bill Elliott	16 September 2015
When one of the toy cars of his racing track set breaks accidentally, Mr. Bean leaves for the toy shop to buy a new set. His Mini has a flat tyre, so he takes a taxi. But the driver deliberately drives Bean around London to get a higher fare, and stops at a petrol station and takes an extended break in a café, leaving Bean locked inside and the taximeter running. Bean escapes, but is mistaken for the driver and ends up transporting three customers, making over £250 in fares, but manages to return the taxi to the petrol station without getting caught. When the taxi driver drops Bean off, the fare is a mere 85 pence. Bean finally goes to the toy shop and buys an elaborate racing track set with the money he made from his taxi driving. This racing track set almost fills his room.
79	27	"Muscle Bean"	Tim Fehrenbach	Alex Collier	Richard Bazley & Bill Elliott	4 January 2016
Mr. Bean purchases an inflatable muscle suit, but while hanging out with Irma, the suit begins to leak and Bean struggles to fix it while hiding from Irma by putting the sticker on leaking part and filling it with gas. Unfortunately, because he just filled it up with helium he begins to fly and lands on the top of the tree. When the deliveryman fails to rescue Bean, Irma rescues Bean instead, losing her heart to the deliveryman while Bean apologises to Irma for deceiving her. Later, Bean and Irma hang out again with Bean giving a muscle balloon to her.
80	28	"A New Friend"	Tim Fehrenbach	Tony Haase	Richard Bazley & Bill Elliott	5 January 2016
Bean makes friends with a seagull.
81	29	"The Lift"	Tim Fehrenbach	Ciaran Murtagh & Andrew Jones	Leigh Fieldhouse & Bill Elliott	6 January 2016
Mr. Bean goes up in the lift to the top floor of a department store, but Teddy is accidentally stuck in the doors, causing the lift to break down and stop working. After the firefighters force open the lift cabin doors and remove Teddy, Mr. Bean buys the last toy car resembling his Mini, but instead gives it to a young boy in exchange for Teddy.
82	30	"Dig This"	Tim Fehrenbach	Ciaran Murtagh & Andrew Jones	Paul Stone, Isabel Castellano & Bill Elliott	7 January 2016
Mr. Bean digs a hole in his garden and finds a bomb, about which he tries to warn Mrs. Wicket and her friend, but they disbelieve him, leaving Mr. Bean into trying to disarm the bomb himself. Due to Scrapper distracting him, he mistakenly cuts the wrong wire that speeds up the timer. He manages to drag Mrs. Wicket and her friend to the bomb, resulting in them quickly barricading themselves in the block of flats. When Bean notices Teddy near the bomb, he successfully retrieves him but is unable to get Scrapper in the apartment just as the bomb explodes, which sends Scrapper flying into the Bruisers' pool and mud raining down on the Bruisers. When a broken water pipe in the crater sprays water out, Bean turns the muddy crater into a homemade pool for him, Mrs. Wicket and her friend to relax while the Bruisers glare at them.
83	31	"Bean Hypnotised"	Tim Fehrenbach	Alex Collier	Les Eaves & Bill Elliott	8 January 2016
Mr. Bean attends a hypnotism show where he unwittingly volunteers to be hypnotised; when the hypnotist makes him think he is a dog, he runs back home where he chases Scrapper around the garden and the block of flats.
84	32	"Car Wash"	Tim Fehrenbach	Ciaran Murtagh & Andrew Jones	Colin White & Bill Elliott	11 January 2016
After a stubborn pigeon poos on his Mini, Mr. Bean washes it thoroughly. A passing motorist, impressed with the shiny car, asks Bean to wash his car, offering him £10, and he builds a makeshift car washing machine at the side of the road. More passing motorists think Bean runs a car wash, and he washes their cars while Mrs. Wicket offers them tea and biscuits. Finally, Bean washes a royal blue car belonging to the Queen, but a passing flock of birds poo all over it. When the normal removal method of using a wire brush to scrape it off does not work, Bean uses an electric mixer to remove the mess, but accidentally scratches the paint off the car in the process. To compensate for this, Bean grinds the whole blue paint off the car, revealing the silver-coloured metal underneath, only to be annoyed by the officers. A moment later, the Queen emerges from the car, likes the new look, and thanks Bean for all his hard work. After Bean receives a substantial payment and the Queen departs, Mrs. Wicket steals all the money.
85	33	"Where Did You Get That Cat?"	Tim Fehrenbach	Jimmy Hibbert	Leigh Fieldhouse & Bill Elliott	12 January 2016
Mrs. Wicket gets a new hat that looks a lot like Scrapper. During a chase between Mr. Bean and Scrapper, the latter accidentally knocks Mrs. Wicket's sideboard down, crushing the hat. Bean mistakes the hat for the actual Scrapper and takes it to the vet. Note: This episode is also derived from the Series 1 episode "Dead Cat".
86	34	"Valuable Lessons"	Tim Fehrenbach	Robin Driscoll	Paul Stone, Isabel Castellano & Bill Elliott	13 January 2016
The burglar duo have returned to burglarise flats. When they discover that Mr. Bean and Mrs. Wicket have tons of money they plan to store and keep safe, the duo hatch up a plan for the short burglar to marry Mrs. Wicket, so that they would murder her, kick Bean out of his flat, and rob it clean. Eventually, their cover is blown by Scrapper, and Bean reveals their plan, causing them to be sent back to prison. Mrs. Wicket breaks down in tears, but Bean assures her that "there's plenty more fish in the sea." Note: This episode is the only appearance of the burglar duo outside of Series 1.
87	35	"Halloween"	Tim Fehrenbach	Alex Collier	Les Eaves & Bill Elliott	14 January 2016
It is Halloween, and Mr. Bean has some fun tricks up his sleeve. He dresses up as a vampire and tries to scare Mrs. Wicket, but it does not work. He scares two boys trick-or-treating and ends up making them cry. He tries to cheer them up with toffee apples, but it backfires due to the apples being stuck to the tray. Bean falls for a trick set up by Bruiser Jr., prompting Bean to start a Halloween prank war with the Bruisers. The battle goes on until Mrs. Wicket gets frightened by the Bruisers looking like witches and Bean looking like a ghost. Mrs. Wicket forces Bean and the Bruisers to sign an agreement to call off the prank war, then asks Bean to offer the Bruisers some toffee apples. He gives them cloves of garlic dipped in toffee instead, getting the last laugh.
88	36	"Bean Painting"	Tim Fehrenbach	Tony Haase	Richard Bazley & Bill Elliott	15 January 2016
While painting a picture of Teddy, Mr. Bean accidentally splashes some green paint on the wall. He goes to a DIY store and buys two cans of brown paint, but accidentally takes home another customer's green paint cans instead. When Bean arrives home, he paints the entire wallpaper green, and experiences a series of nightmares.
89	37	"Wrestle Bean"	Tim Fehrenbach	Alex Collier	Paul Stone, Isabel Castellano & Bill Elliott	18 January 2016
Mrs. Wicket and Miss Wince have fun watching wrestling on television. An annoyed Mr. Bean asks them to turn it down, but they refuse. They have bought tickets for a live wrestling match, and Mr. Bean drops them off at the stadium as promised. He tries to find an available parking space, unintentionally trapping a wrestler named Bruise Force in his trailer. Bean enters the auditorium through the backstage and is mistaken for the wrestler Side Kick Rick's opponent. Bean gives Mrs. Wicket her foam finger, inadvertently knocking Side Kick Rick out and winning the match. Bruise Force breaks free and attacks Bean who then tags Mrs. Wicket and Miss Wince in. Together they beat Bruise Force, earning them the championship belt. Later on, Bean finally gets the appeal of watching wrestling on television.
90	38	"Rare Bird"	Tim Fehrenbach	Tony Haase	Paul Stone, Isabel Castellano & Bill Elliott	19 January 2016
Mr. Bean goes bird-watching and is determined to find a very rare colourful bird. He goes to a bird-watching park, but his constant noise-making and joking around gets him nowhere. Back home, he decides to make a cardboard painting cutout of the bird and convince the bird-watchers that he found the bird. When the cardboard bird falls off the branch, Bean ties it to yarn and pulls on it to make it appear for the bird-watchers to see. However, Scrapper's interference foils the plan, and the bird-watchers angrily leave. Then the actual rare bird shows up and Bean frantically tries to show it to the bird-watchers, but they drive off, still not believing him.
91	39	"Bean's Safari"	Tim Fehrenbach	Jimmy Hibbert	Leigh Fieldhouse & Bill Elliott	20 January 2016
Mr. Bean visits a safari park where he catches the attention of a baby monkey, and unknowingly takes the monkey home in his Mini. After hearing the news that the monkey has been stolen, Bean managed to safely return it without getting caught.
92	40	"A Round of Golf"	Tim Fehrenbach	Ciaran Murtagh & Andrew Jones	Paul Stone, Isabel Castellano & Bill Elliott	22 February 2016
Mr. Bean watches a golf tournament on the TV. The golfer hits the ball using his golf club and the ball falls to the hole; he wins the tournament. Bean gets a trophy he won from the face-pulling competition from his cabinet. He decided to create his own golf course inside his flat. He then invited Irma to join him for a round as well.
93	41	"Superhero Bean"	Tim Fehrenbach	Alex Collier	Paul Stone, Isabel Castellano & Bill Elliott	23 February 2016
Mr. Bean tries to stop a cunning thief who stole his wallet and Mrs. Wicket's jewellery.
94	42	"What a Load of Rubbish"	Tim Fehrenbach	Ciaran Murtagh & Andrew Jones	Les Eaves & Bill Elliott	24 February 2016
Mr. Bean is a bit too over-excited while decluttering his flat; Teddy is accidentally thrown away and ends up in the rubbish dump.
95	43	"The Robot"	Tim Fehrenbach	Jimmy Hibbert	Richard Bazley & Bill Elliott	25 February 2016
Mr. Bean buys a robot to help him clean up his flat, but it ends up creating destruction around London after it malfunctions.
96	44	"Ice Cream"	Tim Fehrenbach	Ciaran Murtagh & Andrew Jones	Paul Stone, Isabel Castellano & Bill Elliott	26 February 2016
On a hot summer day, Mr. Bean decides to buy ice cream from the ice cream van, but right when it is his turn, the ice cream man closes the van for his lunch break. Bean sneaks into the van to makes his own ice cream. He is mistaken for the ice cream man and ends up serving ice cream for a long queue of children, making money in the progress. However, the ice cream machine has already run out. Bean sees the ice cream man walk back to the van and hides in the empty cone box. The ice cream man drives to the factory and refills the machine. Eventually, Bean gets caught but escapes and runs all the way back to the flat. Soon, the ice cream man finds out about the money Bean made and decides to make an ice-cream for him as a thank-you treat. He gives it to Irma who then gives it to Mrs. Wicket. Bean finds out what happened and desperately runs after the van.
97	45	"Birthday Party"	Tim Fehrenbach	Ciaran Murtagh & Andrew Jones	Krystal Georgiou, Bill Elliott & Jess Jackson	29 February 2016
Mrs. Wicket is having a party downstairs, so he tries to gatecrash, but the bouncer refuses Bean's entry as he has no invitation. After several failed attempts to enter, Bean finds his invitation, which was hidden under his doormat all the time. He is finally allowed to enter only to find that the party has just finished and was supposed to be a party for him.
98	46	"In The Garden"	Tim Fehrenbach	Robin Driscoll	Michelle Dabbs, Peter Mays, Bill Elliott & Jess Jackson	1 March 2016
Mr. Bean tries to mow the lawn in the garden, but finds it difficult and inconvenient.
99	47	"A Magic Day Out"	Tim Fehrenbach	Alex Collier	Leigh Fieldhouse & Bill Elliott	2 March 2016
Mr. Bean and Irma are having a day at the seaside, then it starts to rain. The two get to the nearby shelter but Mr. Bean's boot gets accidentally swapped by the stage magician.
100	48	"Ball Pool"	Tim Fehrenbach	Ciaran Murtagh & Andrew Jones	Richard Bazley & Bill Elliott	4 March 2016
Mr. Bean wants to play in the local soft play centre, but he is refused entry because it is only for children. He manages to sneak inside and enjoy the rest of the soft play area until the annoyed parents call the security guard to force Bean to leave. Bean instead decides to convert his flat into a play area, but this unexpectedly attracts the visitors.
101	49	"Pizza Bean"	Tim Fehrenbach	Ciaran Murtagh & Andrew Jones	Krystal Georgiou & Bill Elliott	7 March 2016
Mr. Bean ois dissatisfied with his takeout pizza. He decides to bake his own pizza and establishes his own homemade pizza delivery company, but this soon gets him in deep trouble with the leader of the biggest pizza empire around, Don Crustyoni. A fight occurs between the two that ends with Bean slamming his pizza onto Don's face. Impressed by the taste of the pizza, Don asks for the secret behind it, and Bean shows him the machine used to make pizzas. Bean accepts an offer to sell the machine to Don.
102	50	"The Photograph"	Tim Fehrenbach	Alex Collier	Richard Bazley & Bill Elliott	8 March 2016
Airport check-in staff refuse to let Mr. Bean board a flight, as his passport has no photo, so Bean attempts to make a new one. However, his attempts at doing so fail: he panics inside a photo booth, causing the pictures to be ruined and not done properly, and he does not want to wait in the queue for another try. He photobombs at a tourist's Polaroid camera but the picture is ripped in a fight with the photographer. He rides a roller coaster at a fairground, but in the on-ride photo his face is partially obscured by his tie. At a final attempt, Bean proceeds to trigger a speed camera, but he is caught trying to dismantle the camera and arrested by two nearby police officers. After being released from the police station, Bean puts his mugshot in his passport and the airport check-in staff member finally accepts it; however, by this time his flight has already departed.
103	51	"Dancing Bean"	Tim Fehrenbach	Jimmy Hibbert	Richard Bazley, Bill Elliott & Jess Jackson	9 March 2016
Mr. Bean learns to dance in order to impress Irma.
104	52	"Bean Shopping"	Tim Fehrenbach	Jimmy Hibbert	Leigh Fieldhouse & Bill Elliott	10 March 2016
Mr. Bean accidentally gets locked in a department store overnight and comes face-to-face with a burglar.

=== Special minisode (2018) ===
Title	Directed by	Written by	Storyboarded by	Original release date
"Diamonds Are a Bean's Best Friend"	Dave Osborne	Earl Kress	Paul Stone & Robert Smith	30 October 2018
To celebrate 10 million subscribers on YouTube, Mr. Bean gets the Diamond Play Button from Colin Furze, but it doesn't last long until his play button gets broken in half.

=== Series 3 (2019) ===
Following yet another three-year hiatus, a third series consisting of 26 episodes began airing on 9 April 2019 on CITV as well as on Turner channels worldwide.

No. overall	No. in series	Title	Directed by	Written by	Storyboarded by	Original release date
105	1	"Game Over"	Dave Osborne	Ciaran Murtagh & Andrew Barnett Jones	David Stoten & Robert Smith	9 April 2019
After being introduced to the game console by Mrs. Wicket's nephew, he decided to get one on sale for £10.00, in order to do that, he must be first in line.
106	2	"Special Delivery"	Dave Osborne	Alex Collier	Bill Elliott & Robert Smith	9 April 2019
Mr. Bean is forced to stay in to receive delivery of Mrs. Wicket's new lounge chair, so he dresses up as a woman to receive the delivery, and ends up on a date with the delivery man.
107	3	"A Dog's Life"	Dave Osborne	Ciaran Murtagh & Andrew Barnett Jones	Hugh La Terriere & Robert Smith	16 April 2019
When Mr Bean looks after Irma's dog for the day he has an idea to set up his own dog walking service.
108	4	"Big Stink"	Dave Osborne	Ciaran Murtagh & Andrew Barnett Jones	Benedict Bowen & Robert Smith	16 April 2019
Mr. Bean accidentally crashes his Mini into a pool of slurry, so Bean is desperate to try and get himself, his Mini and Teddy all properly clean again.
109	5	"Birthday Bother"	Dave Osborne	Alex Collier	Alun Edwards & Robert Smith	23 April 2019
On Irma's birthday, Mr. Bean writes out two cards; one nice card and one silly card. Unfortunately, he gets the envelopes mixed up and thus sends the wrong card. After getting the silly card from the postman on the next day, Bean accidentally gives Irma the bad card, so Irma storms back into her house. Bean then tries to get Irma's attention.
110	6	"Bed Bean"	Dave Osborne	Alex Collier	Hugh La Terriere & Robert Smith	23 April 2019
After accidentally breaking his old bed, Mr. Bean tries to fix it but failed. In the next day, he goes to Havlotts to get himself a new one.
111	7	"Spa Day"	Dave Osborne	Alex Collier	Bill Elliott & Robert Smith	30 April 2019
When Mrs. Wicket's out for a spa day with Miss Wince, Mr. Bean has to drive them there... and wait until they're done!
112	8	"Charity Bean"	Dave Osborne	Ciaran Murtagh & Andrew Barnett Jones	Benedict Bowen & Robert Smith	30 April 2019
Mr. Bean competes with Declan to raise the most money for the local donkey sanctuary for the goal of £10,000.
113	9	"Bean Encore"	Dave Osborne	Denise Cassar	Alun Edwards & Robert Smith	7 May 2019
Irma wants to take Mr. Bean to watch a violinist named The Great Eduardo, but Bean wants to prove that he can be better at playing the violin. His poor violin-playing catches the attention of Eduardo who teaches Bean how to play it properly. Eduardo's cat allergy caused by Scrapper leads to Bean replacing him as the violinist for his concert. Note: The end credits for this episode features an off-key violin remix to the theme tune.
114	10	"Mobile Home"	Dave Osborne	Alex Collier	Hugh La Terriere & Robert Smith	7 May 2019
Mr. Bean decides to build his own travel trailer after Mrs Wicket and Miss Wince go off in Miss Wince's campervan.
115	11	"Haunted House"	Dave Osborne	Ciaran Murtagh & Andrew Barnett Jones	Benedict Bowen & Robert Smith	14 May 2019
Mr. Bean is playing football with some kids when the ball flies into a dilapidated and scary-looking house.
116	12	"Eau de Bean"	Dave Osborne	Ciaran Murtagh & Andrew Barnett Jones	Sam Dransfield & Robert Smith	14 May 2019
Mr. Bean accidentally spills Mrs. Wicket's new perfume, so he makes his own to replace it.
117	13	"Running On Empty"	Dave Osborne	Ciaran Murtagh & Andrew Barnett Jones	Alun Edwards & Robert Smith	21 May 2019
Mr. Bean and Teddy go on a seaside trip, but his Mini is out of petrol. Determined, he has to reach his destination in many ways.
118	14	"Bean Bug"	Dave Osborne	Ciaran Murtagh & Andrew Barnett Jones	Bill Elliott & Robert Smith	30 September 2019
Mr. Bean is forced to stay with Mrs. Wicket when his house gets infested with fleas.
119	15	"Coffee Bean"	Dave Osborne	Ciaran Murtagh & Andrew Barnett Jones	Benedict Bowen & Robert Smith	30 September 2019
Mr. Bean tries to duplicate an expensive cup of coffee so he can open his own shop.
120	16	"The Big Freeze"	Dave Osborne	Ciaran Murtagh & Andrew Barnett Jones	Alun Edwards & Robert Smith	1 October 2019
Mr. Bean and Mrs. Wicket's boiler is broken on a freezing winter morning.
121	17	"Scrapper Cleans Up"	Dave Osborne	Ciaran Murtagh & Andrew Barnett Jones	Hugh La Terriere & Robert Smith	1 October 2019
To get a holiday for two to Paris, Mr. Bean and Scrapper must enter a beauty contest so that he can win the contest's first prize for Irma, but Mrs. Wicket ends up stealing his prizes rudely, forcing him to stay at home alone with Scrapper.
122	18	"Coach Trip"	Dave Osborne	Ciaran Murtagh & Andrew Barnett Jones	David Stoten & Robert Smith	2 October 2019
Mr. Bean wants to avoid lunch with Irma's mum, so he goes on an old people's coach trip with Mrs. Wicket.
123	19	"Save That Tree"	Dave Osborne	Alex Collier	Alun Edwards & Robert Smith	2 October 2019
Mr Bean will do anything to save his favourite tree from being cut down.
124	20	"For Sale"	Dave Osborne	Ciaran Murtagh & Andrew Barnett Jones	David Stoten & Robert Smith	3 October 2019
Mrs. Wicket is persuaded by a shady estate agent to sell her flats - so Mr. Bean tries to sabotage the viewings.
125	21	"Jumping Bean"	Dave Osborne	Alex Collier	Benedict Bowen & Robert Smith	3 October 2019
After Mr. Bean accidentally hurts himself while trying to learn skateboarding, he then grabs the scooter from Miss Wince and heads out to the skatepark to challenge the Bruisers.
126	22	"Cat Chaos"	Dave Osborne	Denise Cassar	Hugh La Terriere & Robert Smith	4 October 2019
Mrs. Wicket is annoyingly inconsolable when Scrapper goes missing.
127	23	"Stick It"	Dave Osborne	Alex Collier	Benedict Bowen & Robert Smith	4 October 2019
After Mr. Bean finishes his car model collection, he becomes bored and looks for a new hobby.
128	24	"Bean At The Museum"	Dave Osborne	Denise Cassar	Alun Edwards & Robert Smith	7 October 2019
After Mr. Bean finds a "medallion" in the garden, he takes it to the museum, but the woman checks that it is fake, and the guard throws Bean out. But Bruiser Sr orders him to get it back.
129	25	"A Car For Irma"	Dave Osborne	Ciaran Murtagh & Andrew Barnett Jones	Benedict Bowen & Robert Smith	7 October 2019
Mr. Bean and Declan compete to see who has the best car for Irma.
130	26	"Trophy Bean"	Dave Osborne	Ciaran Murtagh & Andrew Barnett Jones	Hugh La Terriere & Robert Smith	8 October 2019
Mr. Bean goes on an outward bound course with Mrs. Wicket's nephew.

=== Series 4 (2025–2026) ===
Following a five-year hiatus, a fourth series consisting of 52 episodes was commissioned, it began streaming on the occasion of the 35th anniversary of the first live-action episode on 1 May 2025 on ITVX and Boomerang in the UK, and Cartoonito in the rest of Europe.

No. overall	No. in series	Title	Directed by	Written by	Storyboarded by	Original release date
131	1	"A Day In Bed"	Filippo Cigognini	Ciaran Murtagh & Andrew Barnett Jones	Hugh La Terriere	1 May 2025
Mr. Bean decides it's the perfect day to stay in bed and do nothing, but relaxing isn't so easy. From making breakfast without getting up to reaching the remote and dealing with unexpected messes, every little task turns into a huge struggle.
132	2	"Karting Bean"	Filippo Cigognini	Ciaran Murtagh & Andrew Barnett Jones	Alun Edwards	1 May 2025
Mr. Bean teams up with Billy for a big go-kart race against Divia and Mr. Paliwal. Determined to win, Bean pulls out every trick in the book—but with chaos on the track and a high-speed showdown ahead.
133	3	"Bowled Over"	Filippo Cigognini	Alex Collier	Teddy Jones	2 May 2025
Mr. Bean heads to the bowling alley for a fun day out, but when things don't go his way, he resorts to ridiculous tactics to get a strike.
134	4	"Sample Sale"	Filippo Cigognini	Ciaran Murtagh & Andrew Barnett Jones	Hugh La Terriere	3 May 2025
Mr. Bean visits a busy market and indulges in all the free food samples from a food truck. But he doesn't eat them—for a change, he sells them to raise money. His goal is to buy a quirky green car–shaped teapot.
135	5	"Grounded"	Filippo Cigognini	Ciaran Murtagh & Andrew Barnett Jones	Benedict Lewis	4 May 2025
Mrs. Wicket won't let Billy watch TV with Mr. Bean until he does his chores.
136	6	"Un-Suitable"	Filippo Cigognini	Alex Collier	Marc Leighton	5 May 2025
Mr. Bean peeks in at the opening of an art exhibition and sees free snacks being handed out. Now he just has to find a way in.
137	7	"Fitness Instructor"	Filippo Cigognini	Tasha Dhanraj	Marc Leighton	6 May 2025
Mr. Bean can't afford his rent, so Mrs. Wicket offers it for free if he builds her new garden sculptures. He enlists the help of Mr. Paliwal by offering him a "workout session".
138	8	"Trampoline Trouble"	Filippo Cigognini	Ciaran Murtagh & Andrew Barnett Jones	Alun Edwards	7 May 2025
Mr. Bean sneaks into a trampoline park, but a boy keeps annoying him and Teddy.
139	9	"Sheepish Bean"	Filippo Cigognini	Alex Collier	Teddy Jones	8 May 2025
Mr. Bean puts on a sheep costume in an attempt to help Irma promote her knitwear products and increase sales.
140	10	"Page Turner"	Filippo Cigognini	Mark Huckerby & Nick Ostler	Hugh La Terriere	9 May 2025
Mr. Bean comes across a rare book, but is dismayed when it is purchased by someone else. He follows the buyer, seeking an opportunity to read it discreetly.
141	11	"Arcade Trouble"	Filippo Cigognini	Denise Cassar	Hugh La Terriere	10 May 2025
Mr. Bean goes to the arcade, but loses Teddy in a teddy machine!
142	12	"Alarm Bean"	Filippo Cigognini	Alex Collier	Teddy Jones	11 May 2025
Mr. Bean decides to observe a comet that can only be seen once in a lifetime. He prepares to wake up in time for it by hunting for a reliable alarm clock.
143	13	"Operation Wicket"	Filippo Cigognini	Seyi Odusanya	Marc Leighton	12 May 2025
Mr. Bean takes Mrs. Wicket to the hospital for an ingrown toenail. But he gets bored waiting, so he goes off to wander.
144	14	"Supermarket Ride"	Filippo Cigognini	Ciaran Murtagh & Andrew Barnett Jones	Alun Edwards	1 September 2025
Mr. Bean is at the supermarket when he spots a cool fire engine ride, but the security guard makes it clear it's for little kids only.
145	15	"Bean's Blooms"	Filippo Cigognini	Alex Collier	Marc Leighton	1 September 2025
Mr. Bean receives a delivery of a bunch of flowers for Mrs. Wicket, but accidentally runs them over in his car. He can't afford to replace them, so he decides to recreate the bunch by taking flowers one by one from anywhere he can.
146	16	"Drone Rescue"	Filippo Cigognini	Ciaran Murtagh & Andrew Barnett Jones	Teddy Jones	2 September 2025
Mr. Bean gets so engrossed in playing with Mr. Paliwal's new drone that he doesn't notice a car thief stealing his car; they quickly jump into Mr. Paliwal's car and use the drone to track the stolen car to the thief's warehouse hideout.
147	17	"Say Cheese!"	Filippo Cigognini	Tasha Dhanraj	Teddy Jones	3 September 2025
Mr. Bean tricks Irma into a photoshoot just so he can submit a picture for a competition prize.
148	18	"Tale of Two Teddies"	Filippo Cigognini	Ciaran Murtagh & Andrew Barnett Jones	Alun Edwards	4 September 2025
When Scrapper claws a rip in Teddy, Mr. Bean rushes him to the Teddy hospital. As Teddy is being fixed, Mr. Bean is rather taken by another Teddy on sale in the shop.
149	19	"Climbing Bean"	Filippo Cigognini	Alex Collier	Hugh La Terriere	5 September 2025
Mr. Bean takes Billy to a climbing centre, but gets annoyed with a competitive dad who accuses him of being a beginner. Mr. Bean insists he's an expert, but is made to prove it when they both compete for a trophy.
150	20	"Proposal Problem"	Filippo Cigognini	Mark Huckerby & Nick Ostler	Alun Edwards	6 September 2025
Mr. Bean loses a stranger's engagement ring and has to get it back in time for the proposal!
151	21	"Precious Plant"	Filippo Cigognini	Alex Collier	Hugh La Terriere	7 September 2025
Mr. Bean is watering Mr. Paliwal's precious plant while he's on holiday.
152	22	"Bin and Gone"	Filippo Cigognini	Mark Huckerby & Nick Ostler	Benedict Lewis	8 September 2025
Mr. Bean is dismayed to find that the bin men are refusing to take his wheelie bin because the lid won't shut, as it's too full of rubbish - and by the time he's shut it, they've gone!
153	23	"Staycation"	Filippo Cigognini	Mark Huckerby & Nick Ostler	Alun Edwards	9 September 2025
Irma and Lottie are going on a lovely sunny holiday, but it unfortunately gets cancelled due to bad weather, so Mr. Bean has to make some arrangements for the two.
154	24	"Funfair"	Filippo Cigognini	Seyi Odusanya	Teddy Jones	10 September 2025
At a funfair, Mr. Bean wins a balloon for Teddy and ties it to him while he plays on the hook a duck. But he's so engrossed, he doesn't notice his companion floating away!
155	25	"Grandfather Clock"	Filippo Cigognini	Ciaran Murtagh & Andrew Barnett Jones	Benedict Lewis	11 September 2025
Mr. Bean breaks Mrs. Wicket's antique grandfather clock and has to get it repaired before she notices!
156	26	"The New Dress"	Filippo Cigognini	Ciaran Murtagh & Andrew Barnett Jones	Alun Edwards	12 September 2025
In the run-up to a fundraising event for the donkey sanctuary, Irma realises she doesn't have a posh dress, so Mr. Bean goes to buy one for her. However, all the dresses are very expensive - but he comes up with a plan.
157	27	"Wicket's Driving Lesson"	Filippo Cigognini	Ciaran Murtagh & Andrew Barnett Jones	Teddy Jones	2 March 2026
Mr. Bean begins to grow fed up of Mrs. Wicket continuously relying on him as her personal taxi driver to go from place to place, so he decides to give her personal driving lessons.
158	28	"Prize Photo"	Filippo Cigognini	Alex Collier	Alun Edwards	2 March 2026
Mr. Bean learns that a cash prize is available if he can get a photograph of an elusive bird. He tries to tempt the bird into his garden, but naughty squirrels repeatedly get in the way. Finally, he gets the photograph he wanted, but were the squirrels exactly what they seemed?
159	29	"Scrapper's Snack"	Filippo Cigognini	Mark Huckerby & Nick Ostler	Hugh La Terriere	3 March 2026
Mr. Bean builds a model boat to compete in a boat race at the park, but Scrapper interferes. Mr. Bean believes he's swallowed a vital part of his model boat, but where has it really ended up?
160	30	"Movie Mayhem"	Filippo Cigognini	Madeleine Brettingham	Benedict Lewis	4 March 2026
Mr. Bean and Irma go out together for a night at the cinema. Mr. Bean wants to watch a scary looking alien movie, but Irma has already opted for a romantic movie. They both struggle to remain calm and seated while the movies is on.
161	31	"Ghost Spotters"	Filippo Cigognini	Ciaran Murtagh & Andrew Barnett Jones	Teddy Jones	5 March 2026
Mr. Bean is unimpressed with a TV show showing a family earning a fortune for their supposedly haunted house, so he takes advantage of the presenters' gullibility, inviting them over to his flat to try and win a fortune of his own.
162	32	"Necklace Thief"	Filippo Cigognini	Alex Collier	Alun Edwards	6 March 2026
As Mr. Bean is examining an old valuable necklace belonging to Mrs. Wicket, Scrapper unintentionally steals it from him. After, a long chase, he finally gets it back, but is falsely arrested when Mrs. Wicket realises he and her necklace had gone missing.
163	33	"The Big Shrink"	Filippo Cigognini	Alex Collier	Hugh La Terriere	9 March 2026
Mr Bean is helping Irma out on her woolly clothes stall. But when the clothes become dirty, he quickly heads home to wash them, without her noticing. He accidentally manages to shrink the washing, and tries his best to put it right again.
164	34	"Winning Ticket"	Filippo Cigognini	Alex Collier	Benedict Lewis	10 March 2026
Mr. Bean holds a tombola outside his flat so he can earn money to buy an enticing racing car from Mr. Paliwal's jumble sale.
165	35	"Train Trouble"	Filippo Cigognini	Alex Collier	Alun Edwards	11 March 2026
Mr. Bean is running late to catch his train to go on holiday. He catches it just in time, but loses his ticket which an inspector needs to see, so tries to hide from her throughout the journey.
166	36	"Blown Away"	Filippo Cigognini	Mark Huckerby & Nick Ostler	Benedict Lewis	12 March 2026
On an autumn day, Mrs Wicket demands Mr Bean tidies her front lawn, because it is covered in leaves, but there is no leaf blower. Spotting Mr Paliwal using one, Mr Bean borrows it, which proves more useful than intended, when he catches the burglars red handed.
167	37	"Autograph Hunter"	Filippo Cigognini	Ciaran Murtagh & Andrew Barnett Jones	Hugh La Terriere	13 March 2026
The famous actor Clint Chiseljaw is coming to London and everyone, including Mr Bean is desperate for an autograph. Despite his quick thinking of ways to get it, he keeps missing his opportunities.
168	38	"The Sofa Stain"	Filippo Cigognini	Ciaran Murtagh & Andrew Barnett Jones	Alun Edwards	16 March 2026
Mr Bean and Irma have been invited to a house party by Mr and Mrs Paliwal. It isn't long before Mr Bean accidentally stains a chocolate bar on Mr Paliwal's brand new sofa, and is desperate for him not to notice, so tries to wash away the stain while everyone isn't around.
169	39	"Bean The Pet Groomer"	Filippo Cigognini	Ciaran Murtagh & Andrew Barnett Jones	Teddy Jones	17 March 2026
Mr. Bean refuses to take Scrapper to a professional Groomers, due to the high price, even after Mrs Wicket lends him her money. Instead, he secretly grooms Scrapper himself for free, without her noticing. Proud of his work, he decides to set up his own business of pet grooming.
170	40	"Double Date Disaster"	Filippo Cigognini	Ciaran Murtagh & Andrew Barnett Jones	Benedict Lewis	7 September 2026
Due to mix-ups with their respective taxi services, Mr. Bean and Irma ended up in Lodge Hotel while the Paliwals ended up in Hotel Lodge instead.
171	41	"Table Tennis Trick"	Filippo Cigognini	Ciaran Murtagh & Andrew Barnett Jones	Hugh La Terriere	7 September 2026
After accidentally breaking the vase that was meant for Miss Wince's birthday, Mr. Bean had to train himself to win the table tennis tournament hosted by Mr. Paliwal so he could earn money from it.
172	42	"Walking Into Trouble"	Filippo Cigognini	Ciaran Murtagh & Andrew Barnett Jones	Teddy Jones	8 September 2026
Mr. Bean and Irma go hiking at the stone circle but he ends up in more trouble than he expected.
173	43	"Bean's Baby"	Filippo Cigognini	Alex Collier	Benedict Lewis	8 September 2026
After noticing both of Mr. Bean's sandwiches were both eaten by the pigeons, he goes back to the supermarket to buy some more with Teddy.
174	44	"Hiding At Home"	Filippo Cigognini	Ciaran Murtagh & Andrew Barnett Jones	Alun Edwards	9 September 2026
Mrs. Wicket asks Mr. Bean to move out for the night so her uncle Ron can stay in his flat.
175	45	"Bean's Bath Bother"	Filippo Cigognini	Ciaran Murtagh & Andrew Barnett Jones	Teddy Jones	10 September 2026
After repairing his Mini, Mr. Bean looks at the photographer; she is surprised that his Mini is actually an original 1977 Mk IV. But Mr. Bean had to take a bath before he got it pictured.
176	46	"Opera For One"	Filippo Cigognini	Ciaran Murtagh & Andrew Barnett Jones	Alun Edwards	11 September 2026
After the tickets for Italian opera singer Signor Parmigiano were sold out, Mr. Bean is left disappointed; he got an idea, and he decided to make a stage of his own in his garden.
177	47	"Bean Hatches A Plan"	Filippo Cigognini	Ciaran Murtagh & Andrew Barnett Jones	Valentina Ventimiglia	14 September 2026
Mr. Bean buys a chicken from the local farm but he soon realises that his landlady is allergic to feathers.
178	48	"Remote Control Chaos"	Filippo Cigognini	Ciaran Murtagh & Andrew Barnett Jones	Hugh La Terriere	14 September 2026
While Mrs. Wicket and Miss Wince are away to pick up Uncle Ron, Mr. Bean and Billy both teamed up to win an online video competition before they come back home.
179	49	"Scrapper's Feeding Time"	Filippo Cigognini	Alex Collier	Alun Edwards	15 September 2026
Mrs. Wicket and Miss Wince were away to take care of Wince's ill sister, so Mr. Bean is left alone at home to feed Scrapper every morning and afternoon.
180	50	"Pretend Patient"	Filippo Cigognini	Ciaran Murtagh & Andrew Barnett Jones	Teddy Jones	16 September 2026
Mr. Bean fakes an illness to avoid luch with Irma's mother, but she soon arrives at his flat to cook him a special soup for him.
181	51	"Window of Opportunity"	Filippo Cigognini	Ciaran Murtagh & Andrew Barnett Jones	Teddy Jones	17 September 2026
Mr. Bean is helping the Arbour Road to win Britain’s Tidiest Street.
182	52	"Irma's Surprise"	Filippo Cigognini	Ciaran Murtagh & Andrew Barnett Jones	Teddy Jones	18 September 2026
It's Irma's birthday, but Mr. Bean forgot to get her a gift. Mr. Bean asked Diva to make a snow sculpture that looked exactly like Irma's, but once the snowfall ended, he had to stop it from melting.
