= List of Hanazuki: Full of Treasures episodes =

The following is a list of episodes from the series Hanazuki: Full of Treasures.

== Series overview ==
Season	Episodes	Originally released		
Season	Episodes	First released	Last released	Network
1	27	January 12, 2017	July 14, 2017	YouTube
2	8	March 23, 2019	May 4, 2019	Discovery Family

== Episodes ==
=== Season 1 (2017) ===
No. overall	No. in season	Title	Written by	Original release date
1	1	"A Moonflower Is Born"	Dave Polsky	January 12, 2017
A Moonflower named Hanazuki is born on a moon inhabited by colorful Hemkas. Little Dreamer, Hanazuki's creator, delivers her a popsicle-shaped treasure that is promptly stolen by the Hemkas, particularly Red Hemka, who wants to use it to repair his damaged house. Hanazuki agrees to assist Red, but her anger erupts when he and the other Hemkas continue fighting over the treasure, causing her to turn red. After the Hemkas put their fight aside fight to help her, the treasure reacts to Hanazuki's change in mood and sprouts into a red Treasure Tree, which keeps an encroaching black miasma away from the moon.
2	2	"Little Blue Hemka"	Kara Lee Burk	January 12, 2017
While exploring the moon, Hanazuki accidentally sits on top of Blue Hemka, flattening him. The other Hemkas take him to Sleepy Unicorn, whom they believe can restore Blue using his magical powers. However, Sleepy refuses to help due to a disastrous past experience with magic. Hanazuki becomes brokenhearted, turning blue, and futilely attempts to use magic herself to rescue Blue when he is blown away by the wind. Inspired by Hanazuki's resolve to fix her mistake, Sleepy musters the courage to save Blue and return him to normal. Blue celebrates his restoration by planting a blue Treasure Tree for Hanazuki.
3	3	"What's a Chicken Plant?"	Eric Acosta	January 12, 2017
Hanazuki meets Chicken Plant, a Hemka-eating plant creature, who tricks her into leaving Yellow Hemka alone so she can swallow him whole. Returning to see what Chicken Plant has done, Hanazuki discovers that the plant has also devoured Lime Green Hemka, whom she expels inside an egg. Realizing that Chicken Plant only digests things she considers appetizing, Hanazuki climbs into the plant's mouth and escapes in an egg together with Yellow. Her joy at seeing Yellow safe causes a yellow Treasure Tree to grow next to Chicken Plant.
4	4	"Slow Sand Rises"	Dana Starfield	January 12, 2017
After the Hemkas disrupt her garden-planting, Hanazuki finds a Mirror Plant that copies her thoughts and sentences. She uses the plant to vent her frustrations with the Hemkas, who overhear her and feel insulted. Hanazuki later finds her garden engulfed by a pit of "slow sand", and she realizes the Hemkas were trying to move the garden to safe location. Making up with the Hemkas, Hanazuki inspires them to come to Pink Hemka's rescue when he is trapped in slow sand, growing a pink Treasure Tree after the Hemkas lovingly embrace her.
5	5	"Strange Gravity"	Ron Holsey	January 12, 2017
A larger, desolate moon nearly crashes into Hanazuki and the Hemkas' moon, its gravitational force pulling Lime Green Hemka onto its surface. With the two moons anchored together by a tree, Hanazuki climbs onto the other moon to rescue Lime Green. Before long, the other Hemkas grow impatient and saw the tree off, barely giving Lime Green enough time to escape, but leaving Hanazuki caught in the larger moon's gravity. Lime Green leads the Hemkas in saving Hanazuki by tickling their moon's mouth-shaped portal, which pulls Hanazuki down close enough to grow a lime green Treasure Tree to grab onto for safety, and then blows the larger moon away with its sneeze.
6	6	"Seeing Red"	Sam Cherington	January 12, 2017
While the Hemkas are playing pranks on Little Dreamer, Yellow Hemka accidentally drinks the juice of a red treasure plant, developing "Red Hemka fever" that makes him as feisty and uncontrollable as Red Hemka. Red makes the other Hemkas drink the red juice as well, which forces Hanazuki to drink it herself in an attempt to keep them from hurting Little Dreamer. By then, the juice's effects wear off on the Hemkas, leaving Hanazuki the only one with Red Hemka fever. She drinks the juices from other colored plants to calm herself, allowing Little Dreamer to make a new, rainbow-colored treasure, which he takes with him as he leaves.
7	7	"Moonflower Sister"	Kerri Grant	January 12, 2017
Another Moonflower named Kiazuki crash-lands her Spacesurfer on Hanazuki's moon, exciting Hanazuki with the opportunity of making a new friend like herself. Having failed at growing Treasure Trees on her own moon, Kiazuki pretends to accept Hanazuki's friendship in order to learn more about her tree-growing powers, eventually making her promise to give her the next treasure Little Dreamer delivers. When Little Dreamer arrives, Kiazuki's long-suffering pet Zikoro chases him in the hope of pleasing his owner. Hanazuki empathizes with Zikoro and grabs the treasure for him, which inexplicably angers Kiazuki. Hanazuki becomes disheartened and throws the treasure aside, growing a black tree.
8	8	"Baby Chicken Plant"	Julia Prescott	January 12, 2017
Hanazuki is thrilled to learn that Chicken Plant is having a baby, but when she tells everyone else the news, they become terrified and hide. She is warned that all of Chicken Plant's children turn into deadly monsters shortly after birth, which proves to be the case when the baby hatches and rapidly matures by devouring Hanazuki's Treasure Trees. Upon seeing Chicken Plant reject her now adult child, Hanazuki declares herself to be the baby's mother and encourages it to stop its destructive behavior. Touched by Hanazuki's love, the baby sprouts a large feather on its head and floats off into space, leaving Hanazuki to grow another tree next to Chicken Plant.
9	9	"Only in Unicorn Dreams"	Sam Cherington	January 12, 2017
Hanazuki discovers that Sleepy dislikes Kiazuki and pesters him to tell her why, but he insistently refuses. That night, Sleepy's magic horn projects holographic images of his dreams in his sleep, showing Hanazuki visions of other unicorns happily playing with magic until they turn hostile and begin vaporizing each other; the dream ends with a twisted-horned unicorn condemning Sleepy to exile. Kiazuki arrives and, recognizing the events in Sleepy's dream, threatens to fully expose Sleepy's past to Hanazuki. However, Hanazuki sides with Sleepy and respects his decision to keep his past a secret until he feels comfortable with sharing it.
10	10	"Friend or Foe"	Eric Acosta and Dave Polsky	March 11, 2017
After managing to deliver Kiazuki a treasure of her own, Hanazuki learns about the dark miasma known as the Big Bad, which is now approaching her moon. Kiazuki believes she can grow a Treasure Tree to save the moon by being helpful like Hanazuki usually does, but all of her efforts at helping others fail. Desperate, Kiazuki ventures into the Dark Side, a forbidden area of the moon where no Treasure Tree has been grown. Hanazuki follows her and rescues Purple Hemka from a monstrous Mazzadril that is driven away by Kiazuki, who reveals she deliberately lured Hanazuki into danger to rescue her and grow her treasure. However, Kiazuki fails again while Hanazuki's bravery allows her to grow a purple tree, further enraging Kiazuki.
11	11	"Forgive and Forget"	Kerri Grant and Dave Polsky	March 11, 2017
While wandering the Dark Side, Hanazuki and Purple Hemka meet a friendly resident named Doughy Bunington, who explains he has been exiled from the Light Side after eating Chicken Plant's wings in the past. Hanazuki returns to the Light Side and finds that in her absence, the Hemkas have overpicked all the Treasure Trees, which have lost their ability to defend against the Big Bad. Doughy, who is able to communicate with the trees, tells Hanazuki that they can be saved by slathering them with matching hues of rainbow-colored goop. Upon doing so, the trees regain enough strength to temporarily hold the Big Bad back.
12	12	"Brain in a Cave"	Dana Starfield	March 11, 2017
Hanazuki begins preparing everyone on the moon for the Big Bad's return. However, the Hemkas fear the Treasure Trees will not recover in time, so they help Kiazuki build a larger Spacesurfer for them to all escape in, saddening Hanazuki. Suspicious of Kiazuki's willingness to accept their help, Hanazuki and Sleepy discover that she has been working with a megalomaniacal brain named Basil Ganglia, whom Kiazuki has tricked into giving her blueprints for her new ship. Hanazuki awakens the next morning to find that all of her Treasure Trees have been stolen by Kiazuki, who has abandoned the Hemkas and Zikoro. Although furious, Hanazuki is overjoyed that her friends are staying and grows a yellow tree.
13	13	"True Colors"	Kara Lee Burk	March 11, 2017
When the Big Bad begins engulfing the moon, Hanazuki realizes one Treasure Tree is insufficient and decides to recruit Basil for help. Basil, who realizes Kiazuki has betrayed him, agrees on the condition that Hanazuki make him ruler of the moon first. When Hanazuki does, however, he stubbornly refuses to cooperate unless she continues to follow his demands. Appalled by Basil's self-centeredness, Hanazuki flies into a rage while Little Dreamer supplies her with enough treasures to grow an entire grove of red trees, saving the moon.
14	14	"Meteor the Family"	Eric Acosta and Dave Polsky	March 11, 2017
Dazzlessence Jones gets struck on the head during a meteor shower, and when he regains consciousness, he begins speaking to the meteorites as though they are his relatives. Hanazuki, who is unable to hear the meteorites, believes Dazzlessence is hallucinating from his head injury and tries convincing him that the meteorites are not alive. When they find the Hemkas disposing of the meteorites into a crevice, Dazzlessence jumps down to rescue them and is buried under a pile of rocks. Hanazuki fearfully digs him out, growing a lime green Treasure Tree after saving him, though this still does not stop Dazzlessence from talking to the meteorites.
15	15	"The Volcano of Fears"	Dana Starfield	March 11, 2017
Hanazuki has a nervous breakdown over all of her harrowing adventures, so her friends suggest she take the day off to help her relax. When Orange Hemka wanders off, Hanazuki follows him to a volcano that subjects people to apparitions of their worst fears, which she falls into. Sleepy and Dazzlessence enter the volcano to rescue Hanazuki, discovering that her fear is not being there to protect the Hemkas from danger. When Orange also becomes trapped in the volcano, Hanazuki learns that he similarly fears for her safety. She is then able to grow a purple Treasure Tree to save herself and her friends from falling deeper into the volcano.
16	16	"Double Trouble"	Sam Cherington	March 11, 2017
Hanazuki and her friends are faced with a Mazzadril and another egg laid by Chicken Plant at the same time. Hanazuki devises a plan to sway Chicken Plant's baby to their side by having everyone, including the usually neglectful Chicken Plant, lavish it with motherly love so it can fight the Mazzadril. The plan is a success, and the baby, named Junior, manages to fight off the Mazzadril before it matures and flies away. To Hanazuki's surprise, Chicken Plant is sad to see Junior leave without saying goodbye. Hanazuki comforts her and grows a blue Treasure Tree near her.
17	17	"Homesick"	Kara Lee Burk	March 11, 2017
Zikoro begins acting more aggressive than usual as he continues to miss Kiazuki. Sleepy warns Hanazuki that his condition will worsen if he remains away from Kiazuki for too long, but Hanazuki wants nothing to do with Kiazuki, resenting her for abandoning Zikoro and stealing her trees. When the Hemkas try helping Zikoro return to his moon, Hanazuki decides to let them handle the situation to avoid associating with Kiazuki. Due to Hanazuki lessening her authority over her moon, however, the Hemkas fall under Zikoro's influence and enter a feral state. Sleepy builds a Spacesurfer for him and Hanazuki to bring Zikoro home, but they are fired upon shortly after they take off into space.
18	18	"Captured!"	Kerri Grant	March 11, 2017
Hanazuki, Sleepy, and Zikoro are taken captive on Sleepy's home moon and meet Twisted Unicorn, Sleepy's estranged brother, who has overthrown their Moonflower and maintains a magical barrier that allegedly protects their moon from the Big Bad. Twisted requests Sleepy's help to recruit the unicorns rebelling against him, and threatens Hanazuki and Zikoro when Sleepy refuses. Upon meeting the rebels, the three learn from them that Twisted has tried forcing them into servitude, and that they doubt the Big Bad's existence. To convince the rebels of the Big Bad's threat, Hanazuki volunteers to find their missing Moonflower.
19	19	"Hide and Seek"	Story by : Julia Prescott; Teleplay by : Kerri Grant	May 19, 2017
Hanazuki searches for Kiyoshi, the Moonflower of Sleepy's moon, who has secluded himself within a grove of black Treasure Trees. Upon being found, Kiyoshi tells Hanazuki that his black trees are useless against the Big Bad and rejects her help. Twisted confronts Hanazuki and captures her, disbelieving of the Moonflowers' ability to protect the galaxy. Sleepy chases Twisted alongside Kiyoshi, who asks Twisted to give Hanazuki a chance to prove herself. When Little Dreamer arrives, however, Twisted attacks him. In the ensuing battle between Sleepy and Twisted, the barrier is destroyed and the other unicorns immediately turn against Twisted. Hanazuki and Sleepy escape with Kiyoshi, who wishes to learn from Hanazuki, but are forced to leave Zikoro when he remains behind to pin Twisted down.
20	20	"Better Together"	Kerri Grant	May 26, 2017
Shortly after arriving on Hanazuki's moon, Kiyoshi uses his fortune-telling ability to predict that Twisted has been driven off of his moon and is now coming to attack. Kiyoshi flees and hides on the Dark Side, believing he is endangering Hanazuki's moon with his presence. When Twisted does arrive for him, Hanazuki assures Kiyoshi that she will brave the future together with him because, as Moonflowers, they are family. Hanazuki runs to recruit Sleepy against Twisted, but Twisted finds him as soon as she does and holds him hostage.
21	21	"The Resistance"	Dana Starfield	June 2, 2017
Hanazuki learns that any magic used against Twisted makes him more powerful. She remains determined to protect Kiyoshi, but her efforts of resisting Twisted are stymied when Dazzlessence attempts to hand Kiyoshi over to him for the moon's protection, while Sleepy tries to escort Hanazuki to safety. As he chases the Moonflowers, Twisted absorbs the juice of purple Treasure Trees and is filled with courage, becoming even more formidable than ever before. The Moonflowers realize his susceptibility to treasure juice, so they pelt him with pink treasures that turn him overly sweet and sentimental, causing him to reveal his secret desire for Kiyoshi's approval and flee the moon in humiliation.
22	22	"Hemkas Got Talent"	Julia Prescott	June 9, 2017
Hanazuki encourages Kiyoshi to return to his home moon to grow new Treasure Trees, accompanying him on the trip. The Hemkas become depressed when Hanazuki leaves, taking her compliments about Kiyoshi's unicorns to mean that she thinks the Hemkas are inferior. Lavender Hemka gets the idea to build a new house for Hanazuki to impress her, only for it to fall apart as soon as she returns. Hanazuki thanks Lavender for the gift anyway, saying she admires the Hemkas for their teamwork, which the warring unicorns lack. She is then inspired to try a new way of bringing trees to Kiyoshi's moon.
23	23	"Damage Control"	Kara Lee Burk	June 16, 2017
Hanazuki plans to help Kiyoshi by directly transporting a Treasure Tree to his moon. Sleepy sends Kiyoshi a message with instructions for a tractor beam, but Kiyoshi is unable to assert his authority over the unicorns, who are fighting over which color to paint the lunar palace. Zikoro, whom the unicorns already respect for helping overthrow Twisted, succeeds in organizing the unicorns to collect the tree along with Hanazuki, Sleepy, and their Spacesurfer. When Kiazuki's moon passes overhead, however, Zikoro reverts to his feral state, leaving the unicorns in disarray once more. While Hanazuki and Sleepy resume their effort to bring Zikoro home, Kiyoshi is inspired to allow the more cooperative unicorns to paint the palace by themselves, which convinces the bickering ones to end their fighting in order to be included; his idea results in him growing a lavender tree. Shortly thereafter, Sleepy reveals to the Moonflowers that he has called for Kiazuki to pick Zikoro up personally, to Hanazuki's dismay.
24	24	"Recovery"	Julia Prescott	June 23, 2017
Kiazuki is greeted hospitably by Kiyoshi, surprising Hanazuki with their familiarity. Hanazuki remains cold towards Kiazuki, who prepares to leave as soon as she retrieves Zikoro. While helping Kiazuki return home, Kiyoshi sees the desolate state of her moon and asks Hanazuki for a favor. He reveals that Kiazuki is the former organizer of the Garlandians, a team intended to unite the galaxy's Moonflowers against the Big Bad; Hanazuki begrudgingly agrees to help Kiazuki in his place. Upon arriving on Kiazuki's moon, Hanazuki finds her stolen Treasure Trees in dire straits due to the moon's infertile soil. Using Sleepy's magic, Hanazuki is able to provide fresh soil for Kiazuki, and the two make peace. Then, a nearby moon suddenly explodes, its pieces hurdling towards Hanazuki's moon. A meteor strikes Hanazuki's ship as she rushes home, sending her adrift into space, but she is rescued by Maroshi, another Moonflower.
25	25	"Rescued!"	Sam Cherrington	June 30, 2017
Maroshi safely returns Hanazuki and Sleepy to their moon, which has been partially devastated by debris from the exploded moon, revealed to be Maroshi's. Hanazuki discovers that Maroshi and his companions, the Flochis, have already made their new home on her moon and befriended everyone while she was away. Envious, Hanazuki cannot concentrate on planting new Treasure Trees to replace the ones destroyed in the meteor shower. To cheer her up, Dazzlessence shows her the completed house the Hemkas have built for her, proving that they still love and appreciate her. The moment is spoiled when Maroshi tells her that the Big Bad—the cause of his moon's obliteration—is nearby. As soon as the Big Bad begins covering the defenseless moon, Kiazuki and Zikoro return with the now-healthy trees in tow aboard their ship.
26	26	"The Transplant"	Dave Polsky	July 7, 2017
Kiazuki takes charge of the other moon creatures as they replant Hanazuki's stolen Treasure Trees, sending the Hemkas to help Hanazuki deliver rainbow goop to feed the trees. However, a powerful gust of wind blown by the Big Bad scatters the Hemkas across the moon. Hanazuki manages to find all of them except for Red Hemka, who has been blown to the Dark Side. There she finds that the red Treasure Tree grove is still intact, with Doughy and Basil taking refuge there. She also finds a weakening Red slowly fading from existence, which Basil explains is a sickness caused by the Big Bad. Unable to heal Red, and with the Big Bad completely surrounding the moon, Hanazuki cries out for someone to help.
27	27	"Big Bad Sickness"	Dave Polsky	July 14, 2017
Doughy helps Red Hemka recover from his sickness by feeding him with medicinal herbs. Meanwhile, on the Light Side, Hanazuki's friends successfully plant the Treasure Trees and drive the Big Bad away. Kiazuki is ecstatic to have her first victory against the Big Bad, expecting Little Dreamer to reward her with a new treasure. However, Little Dreamer passes her over again to deliver a treasure to Hanazuki. Infuriated, Kiazuki snaps and provokes a Mazzadril into helping her uproot the Treasure Trees, beckoning the Big Bad to return. The Hemkas merge to form a giant Rainbow Hemka, which helps Hanazuki chase Kiazuki down and defeat the Mazzadril. Understanding Kiazuki's despair over her moon's devastation, Hanazuki encourages her to express her true feelings. Kiazuki weeps, turning blue, and is subsequently given a treasure that grows into a blue tree. Kiazuki is overcome with joy and a range of other emotions as Little Dreamer continually gives her and Hanazuki more treasures, producing a multicolored grove that banishes the Big Bad once more.

=== Season 2 (2018–19) ===
A second season was announced on May 9, 2017, and first aired in 2018 on Carousel in Russia. It first aired in English on POP in late 2018 Season 2 premiered on Discovery Family in America on March 23, 2019, and ended on May 4, 2019. It was planned to run for 27 episodes, but it was cut down to 8 episodes.

No. overall	No. in season	Title	Written by	Original release date
28	1	"Surprise, Surprise"	Dave Polsky	March 23, 2019
Hanazuki plans a surprise party for Kiazuki, but Kiazuki is more interested in the mysterious and strange sound emanating from the portal.
29	2	"Underground Escape"	Dave Polsky	April 13, 2019
Hanazuki must rescue Doughy Bunnington after he is swallowed by slow sand. Underground she meets a flower named Depriva who has also captured two new Hemkas (Raspberry, & Emerald).
30	3	"Hemkas Come Home"	Whitney Ralls	April 13, 2019
Hanazuki becomes jealous when Raspberry & Emerald become more attached to Kiazuki than herself. Which then she finds out that those Hemkas remind her of her Zikoros that went missing. Hanazuki promises her that “We’ll find out who stole your Zikoros.”
31	4	"A Little Bit Enormous"	Lee Rubenstein	April 20, 2019
Dazzlessence Jones mentors a new moon creature called Enormous Coal.
32	5	"Building Blocks"	Chris Osbrink	April 27, 2019
Hanazuki lets the other Moonflowers build new rooms in her house.
33	6	"Oh My, Miyumi"	Whitney Ralls	April 27, 2019
Hanazuki discovers the sound from the portal to be a distress signal from another moon. There she meets a new Moonflower named Miyumi, who lives with her Slooths. Till then, they notice that something or someone took Bebe, Miyumi’s favorite Slooth. Miyumi realizes that she has a moon to protect, gives Hanazuki her BoomBox and tells her “If you need any help, give us a tune.” Hanazuki tells her that she’s “not the only one whose little guys were taken.” Which means that firstly was Kiazuki’s pet Zikoro and thought that it was the Big Bad all along. Now something or someone is threatening the moons. Hanazuki then tells her that, “We’re gonna find them, we still have hope.”
34	7	"Dance on the Dark Side"	Emma Fletcher	May 4, 2019
Hanazuki takes Kiazuki to a dance club on the Dark Side. There they meet Axo the bouncer of the club. Kiazuki can't enter it and says that she is not interested in going anyway. Then she starts to dance when she hears the music inside the club. She laughs and it gets her in the club.
35	8	"Feelin' It"	Greg Levine	May 4, 2019
Maroshi gets his first Treasure from Little Dreamer, but he doesn't know how to activate it. Hanazuki and Kiyoshi try to help him in vain, but then discovers that moods can not be forced, but somehow be felt. Maroshi, & Kiyoshi talk about their past, then all of a sudden, Maroshi grows a black treasure tree. They are all excited that this has happened and want Maroshi to come, but then he decides to chill in their trees. Hanazuki and Kiyoshi decide to join him in the end.

=== Shorts (2018) ===
On August 7, 2017, it was announced that Hasbro was preparing a series of 1- to 2-minute-long shorts that would be released between the first and second seasons. Eight shorts were released on June 16, 2018 in the United Kingdom via the Pop Fun mobile app.

No.	Title	Written by	Runtime	Original release date
1	"A Day in the Dream of Little Dreamer"	Whitney Ralls	2:26	June 16, 2018
Little Dreamer flies around the galaxy, taking pictures of various space objects with a camera that magically produces the treasures he gives Hanazuki. It is then revealed that this is Raspberry Hemka's speculation on where the treasures come from.
2	"A Hemka Lullabye"	Whitney Ralls	2:29	June 16, 2018
Hanazuki has difficulty putting the rowdy Hemkas to sleep for the night. She resorts to singing a desperate lullaby, which appears to work until the Hemkas sneak out of the house behind her back.
3	"Good Cop, Shiny Cop"	Whitney Ralls	2:35	June 16, 2018
Dazzlessence Jones loses his boots and believes someone has stolen them, recruiting Hanazuki to perform a good cop/bad cop routine to suspects around the moon. After interrogating every other resident on the moon, he finds the boots in the last place he remembers seeing them.
4	"Sleepy's Relaxation Boot Camp"	Dave Polsky	2:37	June 16, 2018
Sleepy Unicorn puts Hanazuki through "relaxation boot camp" to ease her stress over losing her bracelet, but she is so anxious that she keeps trying to run off to find it. After Hanazuki exhausts herself worrying and falls asleep, Sleepy finds the missing bracelet hanging on a tree and returns it to her.
5	"Doughy's Full-fillment"	Whitney Ralls	2:36	June 16, 2018
The normally insatiable Doughy Bunington suffers an identity crisis when he eats so much that he becomes full. After trying to mimic Basil Ganglia and the Pyramid with a Face, Doughy is delighted to realize he is feeling hungry again and goes back to eating.
6	"Zikoro's Treasure"	Whitney Ralls	2:36	June 16, 2018
Zikoro plays with a treasure discarded by Kiazuki after another failed attempt to grow it, later keeping it for himself when Kiazuki turns red with anger and comes looking for it.
7	"You Owe Me One"	Katie Chilson	2:36	June 16, 2018
Kiazuki struggles to get Zikoro down from atop a Treasure Tree by herself. Reluctant to ask for help outright, she begins doing favors for others around the moon so they may owe her a favor in return. Once the others help her save Zikoro, Hanazuki tells Kiazuki she can simply ask for their help in the future.
8	"Dazzlecize!"	Whitney Ralls	2:37	June 16, 2018
Dazzlessence exercises together with Orange, Pink, Dark Green, Teal, and Yellow Hemka.
