= Deep Trouble =

Deep Trouble may refer to:

- Deep Trouble (radio comedy series), a 2005–2007 BBC radio programme
- "Deep Trouble" (NCIS: Los Angeles), a television episode
- Deep Trouble (Goosebumps), a 1994 novel by R. L. Stine
- Deep Trouble, a 1991 Hardy Boys Casefiles novel

== See also ==
- "Deep, Deep Trouble", a song from the album The Simpsons Sing the Blues
- Double Trouble (disambiguation)
- Trouble (disambiguation)
