= Get Another Boyfriend =

Backstreet Boys song

Song by Backstreet Boys

from the album Black & Blue
- Released: November 21, 2000
- Genre: R&B; Pop
- Length: 3:06
- Label: Jive
- Songwriters: Max Martin; Rami
- Producers: Max Martin; Rami

"Get Another Boyfriend" is a song by American pop boy band Backstreet Boys, released on their 2000 album Black & Blue. The song was featured in Lizzie McGuire.

== Critical reception ==
Entertainment Weekly described it as "essentially Backstreet’s version of 'It’s Gonna Be Me", and felt that along with "The Call" the song was an example of the group presenting themselves as "bad boys on the prowl". Rolling Stone wrote the song had "drama-crazed harmonies". AllMusic felt the song's similarity to "It's Gonna Be Me" and "Baby One More Time" was the result of all three being written by Max Martin. Mashable described it as "attitude-filled". New York Post described the song as having a "distinct quality of musical maturity" that the magazine likened to Michael Jackson's "Thriller".
