= Black & Blue Tour =

2001 concert tour by the Backstreet Boys

Black & Blue World Tour
- Tour by Backstreet Boys
- Associated album: Black & Blue
- Start date: January 22, 2001
- End date: November 25, 2001
- Legs: 5
- No. of shows: 111

Backstreet Boys concert chronology
- Into the Millennium Tour (1999–2000); Black & Blue World Tour (2001); Up Close & Personal Tour (2005)

The Black & Blue World Tour was the fifth worldwide concert tour by the Backstreet Boys in support of their fourth studio album Black & Blue (2000) and the world tour was held throughout 2001. The first leg of the tour began on January 22, 2001, in the U.S. The second leg began on June 8, in the group's hometown of Orlando, Florida, but was temporarily suspended on July 9, in order for group member AJ McLean to seek treatment for clinical depression which led to anxiety attacks and the excessive consumption of alcohol. The tour resumed on August 24 in Milwaukee, Wisconsin and concluded on October 19 in Paradise, Nevada. The world tour ended on November 25, 2001. It grossed over $315 million worldwide, becoming the highest-grossing concert tour by an artist in general of the year. The tour was sponsored by Burger King, Kellogg's, and Polaroid.

On September 11, 2001, band member Brian Littrell's wife Leighanne and a crew member for the band, Daniel Lee, were scheduled to fly from Boston, where the group played their fifth sold-out show the night before to Los Angeles on American Airlines Flight 11. Leighanne canceled her flight the night before because she wanted to spend more time with her husband, but Lee was one of 92 people killed aboard Flight 11 after it was hijacked and crashed into the North Tower of the World Trade Center in New York City. Near the end of their concert in Toronto on September 12, Littrell spoke briefly about Lee and led the audience in a moment of silence for Lee and those who died in the attacks.

== Opening acts ==
- Myra
- Krystal Harris
- Shaggy (June 8, 2001 - July 7, 2001)
- Sisqó (August 24, 2001 - October 19, 2001)

== Setlist ==
=== North America ===
The following songs were performed in the North America leg of the tour, but not in Mexico.

1. "Everyone"
2. "Larger than Life"
3. "Shining Star"
4. "What Makes You Different (Makes You Beautiful)"
5. "Yes I Will"
6. "More than That"
7. "I Want It That Way"
8. "Not for Me"
9. "Show Me the Meaning of Being Lonely"
10. "I'll Never Break Your Heart"
11. "I Promise You (with Everything I Am)"
12. "How Did I Fall in Love with You"
13. "Time"
14. "The Answer to Our Life"
15. "All I Have to Give"
16. "If You Stay"
17. "Everybody (Backstreet's Back)"
18. "Get Another Boyfriend"
19. "The Call"

Encore

1. "Shape of My Heart"

=== Latin America ===
The following songs were performed on March 23, 24, 25, 2001 at Foro Sol, Mexico City. It does not represent all concerts on the tour.

1. "Everyone"
2. "Larger than Life"
3. "Shining Star"
4. "What Makes You Different (Makes You Beautiful)"
5. "Yes I Will"
6. "More than That"
7. "I Want It That Way"
8. "Not for Me"
9. "Show Me the Meaning of Being Lonely"
10. "Quit Playing Games (with My Heart)"
11. "As Long as You Love Me"
12. "I'll Never Break Your Heart"
13. "I Promise You (with Everything I Am)"
14. "How Did I Fall in Love with You"
15. "Time"
16. "The Answer to Our Life"
17. "All I Have to Give"
18. "If You Stay"
19. "Everybody (Backstreet's Back)"
20. "Get Another Boyfriend"
21. "The Call"

Encore

1. "Shape of My Heart"

=== Setlist after break ===
These songs changed after the break:

1. "Everyone"
2. "Larger than Life"
3. "Not for Me"
4. "What Makes You Different (Makes You Beautiful)"
5. "Yes I Will"
6. "More than That"
7. "I Want It That Way"
8. "Quit Playing Games (with My Heart)"
9. "As Long as You Love Me"
10. "I'll Never Break Your Heart"
11. "Don't Want You Back"
12. "Show Me the Meaning of Being Lonely"
13. "How Did I Fall in Love With You"
14. "Time"
15. "The Answer to Our Life"
16. "All I Have to Give"
17. "If You Stay"
18. "Shining Star"
19. "Everybody (Backstreet's Back)"
20. "Get Another Boyfriend"
21. "The Call"

Encore

1. "Shape of My Heart"
2. "Drowning" (Japan Only)

== Tour dates ==
Date	City	Country	Venue	Opening Act
North America
January 22, 2001	Sunrise	United States	National Car Rental Center	
January 23, 2001	Sunrise	United States	National Car Rental Center	
January 24, 2001	Sunrise	United States	National Car Rental Center	
January 26, 2001	Charlotte	United States	Charlotte Coliseum	
January 27, 2001	Atlanta	United States	Georgia Dome	
January 30, 2001	Philadelphia	United States	First Union Center	
January 31, 2001	Philadelphia	United States	First Union Center	
February 2, 2001	Washington, D.C.	United States	MCI Center	
February 3, 2001	East Rutherford	United States	Continental Airlines Arena	
February 4, 2001	Uniondale	United States	Nassau Veterans Memorial Coliseum	
February 5, 2001	Uniondale	United States	Nassau Veterans Memorial Coliseum	
February 7, 2001	Toronto	Canada	SkyDome	
February 8, 2001	Pittsburgh	United States	Mellon Arena	
February 9, 2001	Pittsburgh	United States	Mellon Arena	
February 12, 2001	Rosemont	United States	Allstate Arena	
February 13, 2001	Rosemont	United States	Allstate Arena	
February 15, 2001	Pontiac	United States	Pontiac Silverdome	
February 17, 2001	Minneapolis	United States	Target Center	
February 18, 2001	Grand Forks	United States	Alerus Center	
February 20, 2001	Denver	United States	Pepsi Center	
February 23, 2001	Vancouver	Canada	General Motors Place	
February 25, 2001	Tacoma	United States	Tacoma Dome	
February 26, 2001	Tacoma	United States	Tacoma Dome	
February 27, 2001	Portland	United States	Rose Garden	
March 1, 2001	Oakland	United States	The Arena in Oakland	
March 2, 2001	Oakland	United States	The Arena in Oakland	
March 4, 2001	Sacramento	United States	ARCO Arena	
March 5, 2001	Sacramento	United States	ARCO Arena	
March 8, 2001	Las Vegas	United States	MGM Grand Garden Arena	
March 9, 2001	Las Vegas	United States	MGM Grand Garden Arena	
March 12, 2001	Phoenix	United States	America West Arena	
March 13, 2001	Phoenix	United States	America West Arena	
March 14, 2001	Los Angeles	United States	Staples Center	
March 15, 2001	Los Angeles	United States	Staples Center	
March 17, 2001	San Diego	United States	San Diego Sports Arena	
March 18, 2001	San Diego	United States	San Diego Sports Arena	
March 23, 2001	Mexico City	Mexico	Foro Sol	
March 24, 2001	Mexico City	Mexico	Foro Sol	
March 25, 2001	Mexico City	Mexico	Foro Sol	
Latin America
April 28, 2001	Buenos Aires	Argentina	River Plate Stadium	
May 3, 2001	Rio de Janeiro	Brazil	Estádio do Maracanã	
May 5, 2001	São Paulo	Brazil	Estádio do Morumbi	
May 9, 2001	Maracaibo	Venezuela	Estadio Luis Aparicio El Grande	
May 12, 2001	Caracas	Venezuela	Poliedro de Caracas	
May 13, 2001	Caracas	Venezuela	Poliedro de Caracas	
May 16, 2001	Panama City	Panama	Estadio Nacional de Panamá	
May 19, 2001	San Juan	Puerto Rico	Hiram Bithorn Stadium	
May 20, 2001	San Juan	Puerto Rico	Hiram Bithorn Stadium	
North America (Leg 2)
June 8, 2001	Orlando	United States	TD Waterhouse Centre	Shaggy
June 9, 2001	Tampa	United States	Ice Palace	Shaggy
June 11, 2001	Atlanta	United States	Philips Arena	Shaggy
June 12, 2001	Greenville	United States	BI-LO Center	Shaggy
June 13, 2001	Raleigh	United States	Raleigh Entertainment & Sports Arena	Shaggy
June 15, 2001	Bristow, Virginia	United States	Nissan Pavilion at Stone Ridge	Shaggy
June 17, 2001	Greensboro, North Carolina	United States	Greensboro Coliseum	Shaggy
June 20, 2001	Noblesville, Indiana	United States	Deer Creek Music Center	Shaggy
June 21, 2001	Lexington, Kentucky	United States	Rupp Arena	Shaggy
June 22, 2001	Columbus, Ohio	United States	Nationwide Arena	Shaggy
June 23, 2001	Nashville	United States	Gaylord Entertainment Center	Shaggy
June 25, 2001	Burgettstown, Pennsylvania	United States	Post-Gazette Pavilion	Shaggy
June 26, 2001	Burgettstown, Pennsylvania	United States	Post-Gazette Pavilion	Shaggy
June 28, 2001	Hartford, Connecticut	United States	ctnow.com Meadows Music Theatre	Shaggy
June 29, 2001	Hartford, Connecticut	United States	ctnow.com Meadows Music Theatre	Shaggy
June 30, 2001	Albany, New York	United States	Pepsi Arena	Shaggy
July 1, 2001	Albany, New York	United States	Pepsi Arena	Shaggy
July 3, 2001	Camden, New Jersey	United States	Tweeter Center at the Waterfront	Shaggy
July 5, 2001	Hershey, Pennsylvania	United States	Hersheypark Stadium	Shaggy
July 6, 2001	Boston	United States	FleetCenter	Shaggy
July 7, 2001	Boston	United States	FleetCenter	Shaggy
North America (Leg 3)
August 24, 2001	Milwaukee	United States	Bradley Center	Sisqo
August 25, 2001	Cincinnati	United States	Firstar Center	Sisqo
August 26, 2001	Maryland Heights, Missouri	United States	Riverport Amphitheatre	Sisqo
August 27, 2001	Kansas City, Missouri	United States	Kemper Arena	Sisqo
August 29, 2001	Houston	United States	Compaq Center	Sisqo
August 30, 2001	San Antonio	United States	Alamodome	Sisqo
August 31, 2001	Dallas	United States	American Airlines Center	Sisqo
September 4, 2001	Uniondale, New York	United States	Nassau Veterans Memorial Coliseum	Sisqo
September 6, 2001	East Rutherford	United States	Continental Airlines Arena	Sisqo
September 7, 2001	East Rutherford	United States	Continental Airlines Arena	Sisqo
September 8, 2001	Boston	United States	FleetCenter	Sisqo
September 9, 2001	Boston	United States	FleetCenter	Sisqo
September 10, 2001	Boston	United States	FleetCenter	Sisqo
September 12, 2001	Toronto	Canada	Air Canada Centre	Sisqo
September 13, 2001	Toronto	Canada	Air Canada Centre	Sisqo
September 14, 2001	Toronto	Canada	Air Canada Centre	Sisqo
September 15, 2001	Ottawa	Canada	Corel Centre	Sisqo
September 17, 2001	Montreal	Canada	Molson Centre	Sisqo
September 18, 2001	Buffalo	United States	HSBC Arena	Sisqo
September 19, 2001	Cleveland	United States	Gund Arena	Sisqo
September 20, 2001	Auburn Hills, Michigan	United States	The Palace of Auburn Hills	Sisqo
September 22, 2001	Tinley Park, Illinois	United States	Tweeter Center	Sisqo
September 23, 2001	Minneapolis	United States	Target Center	Sisqo
September 26, 2001	Calgary	Canada	Pengrowth Saddledome	Sisqo
September 27, 2001	Calgary	Canada	Pengrowth Saddledome	Sisqo
September 28, 2001	Edmonton	Canada	Skyreach Centre	Sisqo
October 1, 2001	Vancouver	Canada	General Motors Place	Sisqo
October 2, 2001	Portland	United States	Rose Garden Arena	Sisqo
October 4, 2001	Nampa, Idaho	United States	Idaho Center	Sisqo
October 5, 2001	Salt Lake City	United States	Delta Center	Sisqo
October 7, 2001	Albuquerque, New Mexico	United States	ABQ Journal Pavilion	Sisqo
October 10, 2001	Denver	United States	Pepsi Center	Sisqo
October 12, 2001	Phoenix	United States	Cricket Pavilion	Sisqo
October 13, 2001	San Bernardino, California	United States	Blockbuster Pavilion	Sisqo
October 15, 2001	San Jose, California	United States	Compaq Center at San Jose	Sisqo
October 17, 2001	Bakersfield, California	United States	Bakersfield Centennial Garden	Sisqo
October 19, 2001	Las Vegas	United States	MGM Grand Garden Arena	Sisqo
Asia
November 19, 2001	Tokyo	Japan	Tokyo Dome	
November 20, 2001	Tokyo	Japan	Tokyo Dome	
November 21, 2001	Tokyo	Japan	Tokyo Dome	
November 23, 2001	Nagoya	Japan	Nagoya Dome	
November 25, 2001	Osaka	Japan	Osaka Dome	

Festivals and other miscellaneous performances
^{A} Wango Tango
^{B} The Concert for New York City
^{C} United We Stand: What More Can I Give

Cancellations and rescheduled shows

March 5, 2001	Anaheim, California	Arrowhead Pond of Anaheim	Cancelled
March 14, 2001	San Diego, California	San Diego Sports Arena	Rescheduled to March 17, 2001
May 5, 2001	São Paulo, Brazil	Sambódromo do Anhembi	Moved to Estádio do Morumbi
May 6, 2001	São Paulo, Brazil	Sambódromo do Anhembi	Cancelled
June 20, 2001	Lexington, Kentucky	Rupp Arena	Rescheduled to June 21, 2001
June 21, 2001	Burgettstown, Pennsylvania	Post-Gazette Pavilion	Rescheduled to June 26, 2001
June 26, 2001	Noblesville, Indiana	Deer Creek Music Center	Rescheduled to June 20, 2001
July 9, 2001	Boston, Massachusetts	FleetCenter	Rescheduled to September 8, 2001
July 10, 2001	Boston, Massachusetts	FleetCenter	Rescheduled to September 9, 2001
July 11, 2001	Boston, Massachusetts	FleetCenter	Rescheduled to September 10, 2001
July 13, 2001	Ottawa, Canada	Canadian Tire Centre	Rescheduled to September 15, 2001
July 14, 2001	Buffalo, New York	KeyBank Center	Rescheduled to September 18, 2001
July 16, 2001	East Rutherford, New Jersey	Continental Airlines Arena	Rescheduled to September 6, 2001
July 17, 2001	East Rutherford, New Jersey	Continental Airlines Arena	Rescheduled to September 7, 2001
July 18, 2001	Uniondale, New York	Nassau Veterans Memorial Coliseum	Rescheduled to September 4, 2001
July 20, 2001	Cleveland, Ohio	Gund Arena	Rescheduled to September 19, 2001
July 21, 2001	Tinley Park, Illinois	Tweeter Center	Rescheduled to September 22, 2001
July 22, 2001	Minneapolis, Minnesota	Target Center	Rescheduled to September 23, 2001
July 24, 2001	Auburn Hills, Michigan	The Palace at Auburn Hills	Rescheduled to September 20, 2001
July 26, 2001	Montreal, Canada	Molson Centre	Rescheduled to September 17, 2001
July 27, 2001	Toronto, Canada	Air Canada Centre	Rescheduled to September 12, 2001
July 28, 2001	Toronto, Canada	Air Canada Centre	Rescheduled to September 13, 2001
July 29, 2001	Toronto, Canada	Air Canada Centre	Rescheduled to September 13, 2001
August 2, 2001	Calgary, Canada	Scotiabank Saddledome	Rescheduled to September 26, 2001
August 3, 2001	Calgary, Canada	Pengrowth Saddledome	Rescheduled to September 27, 2001
August 4, 2001	Edmonton, Canada	Skyreach Centre	Rescheduled to September 28, 2001
August 7, 2001	Vancouver, Canada	General Motors Place	Rescheduled to October 1, 2001
August 9, 2001	Tacoma, Washington	Tacoma Dome	Cancelled
August 10, 2001	Portland, Oregon	Rose Garden Arena	Rescheduled to October 2, 2001
August 11, 2001	Seattle	KeyArena	Cancelled
August 12, 2001	Bakersfield, California	Rabobank Arena	Rescheduled to October 17, 2001
August 13, 2001	San Jose, California	Compaq Center at San Jose	Rescheduled to October 15, 2001
August 16, 2001	Inglewood, California	Great Western Forum	Cancelled
August 17, 2001	Las Vegas, Nevada	MGM Grand Garden Arena	Rescheduled to October 19, 2001
August 18, 2001	San Bernardino, California	Blockbuster Pavilion	Rescheduled to October 17, 2001
August 20, 2001	Salt Lake City, Utah	Delta Center	Rescheduled to October 5, 2001
August 22, 2001	Denver, Colorado	Pepsi Center	Rescheduled to October 10, 2001
September 1, 2001	North Little Rock, Arkansas	Alltel Arena	Cancelled
October 20, 2001	Chula Vista, California	Coors Amphitheatre	Cancelled

== Personnel ==
- Lead Vocals: Kevin Richardson, Brian Littrell, Howie Dorough, Nick Carter, AJ McLean
- Tour Director:
- Tour Manager: Paul "Skip" Rickert
- Assistant Tour Manager: Tim Krieg
- Co-Director: Denise McLean
- Co-Director: Nicole Peltz
- Press Liaison: Leila Eminson
- Tour Accountant: Vincent Corry
- Staff Photographer: Andre Csillig
- Musical Director:
- Costume Design: Jill Focke, Kerstin 'Kiki' Theileis, Janine Schreiber
- Choreographer: Fatima Robinson
- Assistant Choreographer: Richard "Swoop" Whitebear*
- Web Master: Leigh Dorough (née Boniello)*

=== Security ===
- Billy Evans: Head of Security/Nick's Security
- Nelson Monteiro: Brian's Security
- Raul Ibanez: Howie's Security
- Marcus Johnson: AJ's Security
- Carlos Cardenas: Kevin's Security

=== Band ===
- Keyboards: Darrell Smith, Dave Delhomme
- Guitars: Andy Abad, Tariqh Akoni
- Percussion: Ramon Yslas
- Bass: Sam Sims
- Drums: Teddy Campbell

=== Dancers ===
- Shannon Lopez
- Earl "Sleepy" Manning*
- Michelle Molchanov (now Landau)
- Reginald "Reggie" Jackson*
- Lisa Fraser
- Richmond "Rich" Talauega**
- Anthony "Tone" Talauega**
- Nikki Tuazon
- Earl "Punch" Wright
- Russell Wright

Info

- indicates which dancer appear in the last tour
  - Rich and Tone also choreograph the Boys' reminding tours: Never Gone, IAWLT and their Vegas residency
    - Leigh, who was dating Howie at the time, later became his wife in 2007 after six years of dating since meeting in December 6, 2000
