= List of awards and nominations received by Backstreet Boys =

As one of the best-selling artists worldwide, the Backstreet Boys have received numerous awards and accolades in recognition of their worldwide success in the music industry. Below is the list of awards and nominations of the Backstreet Boys. The group has received nine Grammy Award nominations in total, including four in 2000 and their ninth nomination in 2018 for the 61st Grammy Awards taking place in February 2019.

== Grammy Awards ==
The Grammy Awards are awarded annually by the National Academy of Recording Arts and Sciences. The Backstreet Boys have received eight or nine nominations, including Album of the Year, Record of the Year and Best New Artist. On December 7, 2018, the Backstreet Boys were nominated for the Grammy Award for Best Pop Duo/Group Performance.

Year	Nominee / work	Award	Result
1999	Backstreet Boys	Best New Artist	Nominated
2000	Millennium	Album of the Year	Nominated
2000	Millennium	Best Pop Vocal Album	Nominated
2000	"I Want It That Way"	Record of the Year	Nominated
2000	"I Want It That Way"	Song of the Year	Nominated
2000	"I Want It That Way"	Best Pop Performance by a Duo or Group with Vocals	Nominated
2001	"Show Me the Meaning of Being Lonely"	Best Pop Performance by a Duo or Group with Vocals	Nominated
2002	"Shape of My Heart"	Best Pop Performance by a Duo or Group with Vocals	Nominated
2019	"Don't Go Breaking My Heart"	Best Pop Duo/Group Performance	Nominated

== Hollywood honors ==
=== Hollywood Walk of Fame ===
Year	Category	Nominated work	Result	Ref.
2013	20 years of music (20th anniversary)	Music	Inducted	

== 1995 ==
- Smash Hits Awards
  - Best New Tour Act

== 1996 ==
- Bravo Otto
  - Gold Pop Group
- Goldene Kamera
  - Best Boyband
- MTV Europe Music Awards
  - MTV Select: "Get Down (You're the One For Me)"
- Viva Comet Awards
  - Durchstarter (Best Newcomers)
  - The Shooting Star of the Year

== 1997 ==
- Bravo Otto
  - Gold Pop Group
- MTV Europe Music Awards
  - Select: "As Long As You Love Me"
  - Best Dance (nominated)
- Viva Comet Awards
  - Durchstarter (Best Newcomers)

== 1998 ==
- Billboard Music Awards
  - Group Album of the Year: "Backstreet Boys"
- Bravo Otto
  - Gold Pop Group
- ECHO awards
  - Best International Group
- MuchMusic Video Awards
  - Peoples Choice Favorite International Group
- MTV Video Music Awards
  - Best Group Video: "Everybody (Backstreet's Back)"
  - Best Dance Video: “Everybody (Backstreet's Back)” (nominated)
- Smash Hits Poll Winners Awards
  - Best Non-British Act
- TMF Awards (Nertherlands)
  - Best international album: "Backstreet Boys"
  - Best international single: "As Long as You Love Me"
  - Best international live act
- Viva Comet Awards
  - Durchstarter (Best Newcomers)
- World Music Awards
  - World's Best-selling Dance Artist

== 1999 ==
- American Music Awards
  - Favorite Pop/Rock Band, Duo or Group (nominated)
  - Concert Artist of the Year (4th place)
- Billboard Music Awards
  - Album of the Year: Millennium
  - Albums Artist Duo/Group of the Year
  - Albums Artist of the Year
  - Artist of the Year
- Blockbuster Entertainment Awards
  - Favorite CD: Millennium
  - Favorite Group - Pop
- Bravo Otto
  - Silver Band
- MuchMusic Video Awards
  - Peoples Choice Favorite International Group
- MTV Europe Music Awards
  - Best Group
  - Best Song: ”I Want It That Way“ (nominated)
  - Best Album: Millennium (nominated)
  - Best Pop (nominated)
- MTV Video Music Awards
  - Viewer's Choice: "I Want It That Way"
  - Video of the Year: “I Want It That Way” (nominated)
  - Best Group Video: “I Want It That Way” (nominated)
  - Best Pop Video: “I Want It That Way” (nominated)
- Nickelodeon Kids Choice Awards
  - Favorite Song: "Everybody (Backstreet's Back)"
  - Favorite Music Group (nominated)
- Smash Hits Poll Winners Awards
  - Best Band on Planet Pop
  - Best Non-British Band
  - Best Single of 1999: "I Want It That Way"
  - Best Album of 1999: "Millennium"
  - Best Pop Video: "Larger than Life"
- Teen Choice Awards
  - Choice Music Video of the Year: "All I Have To Give"
  - Choice Music Group (nominated)
  - Choice Music Single: “I Want It That Way” (nominated)
  - Choice Love Song: “I'll Never Break Your Heart“ (nominated)
  - Choice Summer Song: “I Want It That Way” (nominated)
  - Choice Music Video of the Year: “I Want It That Way” (nominated)
- Viva Comet Awards
  - Zuschauer-Comet Viva (Viewers' Choice)
- World Music Awards
  - World's Best-selling Pop Group

== 2000 ==
- American Music Awards
  - Favorite Pop/Rock Band, Duo or Group
  - Favorite Pop/Rock Album: Millennium (nominated)
- Bravo Otto
  - Gold Pop Group
- Juno Award
  - Best-selling Album (foreign or domestic): Millennium
- Nickelodeon Kids Choice Awards
  - Favorite Music Group
- MTV Europe Music Awards
  - Best Group
  - Best Pop (nominated)
- People's Choice Awards
  - Favorite Musical Group
- Teen Choice Awards
  - Choice Album: Millennium
  - Choice Pop Group (nominated)
  - Choice Single: "Show Me the Meaning of Being Lonely" (nominated)
  - Choice Love Song: "Show Me the Meaning of Being Lonely" (nominated)
  - Choice Music Video: ”The One“ (nominated)
- World Music Awards
  - World's Best-selling American Group
  - World's Best-selling Pop Group
  - World's Best-selling R&B Group
  - World's Best-selling Dance Artist
- Radio Music Awards
  - Radio Slow Dance Song Of The Year: "Show Me the Meaning of Being Lonely"
  - Artist Of The Year (Top 40 Pop Radio) (nominated)

== 2001 ==
- American Music Awards
  - Favorite Pop/Rock Band, Duo or Group
- MuchMusic Video Awards
  - Peoples Choice Favorite International Group
- TMF Awards (Nertherlands)
  - Best International Pop Group
- World Music Awards
  - World's Best-selling Pop Group
  - World's Best-selling American Group

== 2002 ==
- RIAJ
  - 17th Japan Gold Disc Award 2002
- MTV Video Music Awards Japan
  - Best Group
  - Beat Pop (nominated)
- MTV Asia Awards
  - Favorite Video: "The Call"
  - Best Pop Act (nominated)

== 2005 ==
- Bravo Otto
  - Bronze Pop Group

== 2006 ==
- MTV Asia Awards
  - Favourite Pop Act

== 2009 ==
- Starshine Music Awards
  - Best Live Show

== 2010 ==
- Japan Gold Disc Award
  - International Song of the Year: "Straight Through My Heart"
- Starshine Music Awards
  - Best Dance Song: "Straight Through My Heart"
  - Best Pop Song: "Bigger"
  - Favorite Band/Group
  - Best Live Show
  - Song of the Year: "Straight Through My Heart"
  - Album Of The Year: "This Is Us"
  - Artist of the Year

== 2011 ==
- NewNowNext Awards
  - Best New Indulgence: New Kids On The Block/Backstreet Boys – Summer Tour 2011

== 2013 ==
- Hollywood Walk of Fame
  - Star on the Walk of Fame

== 2014 ==
- MTV Movie Awards
  - Best Musical Moment

== 2015 ==
- Kentucky Music Hall of Fame - Kevin Richardson and Brian Littrell

== 2018 ==
- CMT Music Awards
  - CMT Music Award for CMT Performance of the Year

== 2019 ==
- Viña del Mar International Song Festival
  - "Gaviota de Plata" (Silver Seagull) and "Gaviota de Oro" (Golden Seagull)
- MTV Video Music Awards
  - Best Group (nominated)
