= Backstreet Project =

American comic book created by Nick Carter and Stan Lee

Publication information
- Publisher: Stan Lee Media
- Format: One-shot
- Genre: Superhero
- Publication date: August 27, 2000
- No. of issues: 1
- Main character: Cyber Crusaders (Backstreet Boys)

Creative team
- Written by: Nick Carter, Stan Lee, Bryce Zabel, Steve Gerber, Jim Salicrup
- Artist(s): Nick Carter, Ruben Martinez
- Penciller: Ruben Martinez
- Inker(s): Scott Koblish, Andy Pearlman, Batt, Sean Parsons, Jessee Delperdong
- Letterer(s): Fishbrain, Bongotone
- Colorist(s): Fishbrain, Bongotone

Backstreet Project is an American comic book created by Nick Carter and Stan Lee. The comic features members of Carter's band the Backstreet Boys as themselves as well as a team of superheroes called "Cyber Crusaders". The book was available for purchase at their concerts and online stores in 2000–2001.

== Publication history ==
Nick Carter, who was a comic fan, made an original concept of the comic planned as a six-issue series. In February 2000, he met Stan Lee through his manager from The Firm. Carter told him about his concept, and Lee was interested. However, they ultimately decided to make it into only one issue.

== Plot ==
It begins when the Backstreet Boys are in the midst of one of their concerts. As they are performing on stage, a spaceship crashes near the stadium. The members rush into the woods to the crash site and there they find an alien who was on the ship. The alien gives each of them an enchanted amulet embedded with mystic crystals and they learn that she is on a mission of protecting Earth from an alien invasion that would happen soon. When they wear the amulets their DNA gets twisted by a virtual genetic cyclone that gives each of them astonishing super powers. The superhero form of the Backstreet Boys are called Cyber Crusaders.

== Characters ==
Backstreet Boys/Cyber Crusaders
Name	Alter ego	Abilities and Superpowers
Ninja Man	Nick Carter	Martial arts expert of any kind. Equipped with swords that can cut everything.
Illusioneer	Howie Dorough	Project three-dimensional illusions and mental telepathy.
Ordnance	AJ McLean	Excellent marksmanship with any weapon. Equipped with laser guns.
Top Speed	Brian Littrell	Able to generate spheres of energy and jump great heights, for example from buildings to buildings.
Power Lord	Kevin Richardson	Super strength. Can lift a harrier jet.

Aliens
Name	Superpower
Zanell	Psychokinesis
Zator	Psychokinesis

== Other media ==
Burger King made action figures based on this comic book characters, they were sold in 2000 with the purchase of Burger King Big Kids Meal and Kids Meal. The Backstreet Boys and their cartoon characters also appeared in three Burger King TV commercials.

A series of flash-based webisodes were released in 2000. None of the characters were voiced by members of Backstreet Boys themselves. While twenty-two episodes were planned, only seven were released prior to the collapse of Stan Lee Media:

1. Larger Than Life
2. Dead Heat
3. Wild Ride
4. Winner Takes All
5. Freefall
6. Zanell's Choice
7. The Camera Hates You
