= Black & Blue (Backstreet Boys album) =

2000 studio album by Backstreet Boys

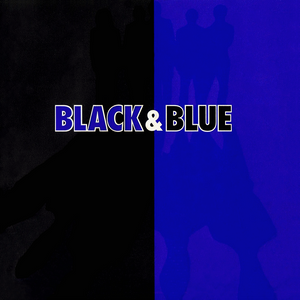

Studio album by Backstreet Boys
- Released: November 21, 2000
- Recorded: July 1 – September 2000
- Studios: Cheiron & Polar (Stockholm, Sweden); Darkchild (Pleasantville, New Jersey); Parc (Orlando, Florida); Brandon's Way (Los Angeles, California)
- Genres: Pop; dance-pop; teen pop; R&B
- Length: 47:53
- Label: Jive
- Producers: Timmy Allen; Babyface; Larry "Rock" Campbell; Franciz & LePont; Rodney Jerkins; David Kreuger; Kristian Lundin; Per Magnusson; Max Martin; Rami Yacoub

Backstreet Boys chronology
Millennium (1999)	Black & Blue (2000)	The Hits – Chapter One (2001)

Singles from Black & Blue
- 1. "Shape of My Heart" Released: October 3, 2000; 2. "The Call" Released: February 6, 2001; 3. "More than That" Released: May 29, 2001

Black & Blue is the fourth studio album (third in the United States) by American boy band Backstreet Boys, released on November 21, 2000, by Jive Records. The album recorded the best international sales in a week for an album in history by selling over 5 million copies globally in its first week of sales. In the United States, Black & Blue sold 1.5 million copies in its first week of release, making the Backstreet Boys the first group in Soundscan history to have million-plus first-week sales with back-to-back albums. It sold over 15 million copies worldwide.

The first single from the album was "Shape of My Heart," followed by "The Call," and "More than That." The band members wrote two songs and co-wrote five songs on this album, more than on previous albums. To promote the album, the band embarked on the Black & Blue World Tour in 2001.

== Background ==
The album was recorded from July 1, 2000, to September 2000. In August 2000, the band gave fans their first glimpse of the album, including the track "It's True" on a series of CDs made available through Burger King. Backstreet Boys member AJ McLean stated that it would incorporate genres of rock, R&B, hip-hop, and country. He also revealed that Nick Carter and Kevin Richardson would be playing on the drums and piano respectively.

== Title and lyrical content ==
According to Entertainment Weekly editor David Browne, the album title is a nod to their two musical sides: Black (as in the R&B inflections of their upbeat tracks) and Blue (their inclination toward mushy crooning). It also represented Lou Pearlman's abuse and bruises. Browne wrote that "The Call" (a dance-pop song) "tells how to cheat on your mate by telling her your cell phone battery's low!, but it also has the blowsy feel of a rejected show tune". Rolling Stone's Barry Walters called it "the album's most frenzied cut". The second track "Shape of My Heart" was described by Browne as a "predictable ballad", while AllMusic's editor Stephen Thomas Erlewine wrote that "the song flows as gracefully as 'I Want It That Way', prove that the Backstreet Boys do teen pop ballads better than anyone." The third track "Get Another Boyfriend" uses "drama-crazed harmonies" and was described by Walters as "the album's most frenzied cut". Erlewine wrote that the track is a "dead ringer for 'It's Gonna Be Me' crossed with 'Baby One More Time'". Walters wrote that "not even R&B kingpin Rodney "Darkchild" Jerkins can erase the Scandinavian sparkle from the fourth track "Shining Star".

Walters wrote the sixth track, "The Answer to Our Life," which "bounces along on a perky melody inspired by their Swedish mentors." The seventh track, "Everyone," celebrates themselves and the power of their audience. Browne wrote that the song is "a clunky foot stomper, which continues the self-congratulatory tradition of their earlier 'We've Got It Goin' On' and 'Larger than Life.'" The eighth track, the ballad "More than That", was praised by critics. Entertainment Weekly praised "the graceful way their voices blend on the chorus," while Rolling Stone praised "the symphonic splendor of the track." The ninth track, "Time," was written by the band members. Browne called it "piffle," while Walters said that it "could've sprung from any substandard Nashville jingle meister." The tenth track, "Not for Me," received positive reviews. Browne praised "the spunky way they vault into the track." Browne wrote that "Time" & the 11th track "Yes I Will" appeared to be vying in a contest for "Next Big Wedding Song," but still acknowledged "the suave manner in which they engage in their trademark vocal swapping track" on the latter song. The 12th track, "It's True," is another ballad in the same vein as the others, while the last track, "How Did I Fall in Love with You," is sung by Howie D and Brian Littrell while the rest of the group does background.

== Critical reception ==
Professional ratings
Aggregate scores
Source	Rating
Metacritic	61/100
Review scores
Source	Rating
AllMusic	3/5 stars
Entertainment Weekly	C
Los Angeles Times	1.5/4 stars
Q	3/5 stars
Robert Christgau	(dud)
Rolling Stone	3/5 stars
Wall of Sound	6.3/10
Yahoo! Music UK	5/10

Upon its release, Black & Blue received generally favorable reviews from music critics, with an aggregate score of 61/100 based on ten critics from Metacritic.

Stephen Thomas Erlewine opined that "what gives Black & Blue character is that it's clear that the Backstreets want to remain kings of their world. So, the ballads are smoother than ever, and their dance numbers hit harder, all in an attempt to keep their throne." Billboard staff wrote that "Beyond ballads, Black & Blue crackles with funk-inflected uptempo ditties that are notable for their rough edges."Black & Blue Barry Walters of Rolling Stone stated that "the Boys still harmonize as well as the faceless background singers who prop up lesser pop puppets." Q wrote that "The sound has changed little, and the level of emoting none. Still, thunderous grooves such as 'Everyone' and 'Shining Star' continue to be virtually irresistible, while the quieter moments, including the hit single 'Shape of My Heart' will wow the ladies and the more sensitive gents for a while yet." CDNow labeled it "unquestionably the most seamless boy band release of the year."

David Browne wrote for Entertainment Weekly that "Black & Blue merely maintains a holding pattern, recycling their past and doing little to establish a firm future." Rebecca Dien-Johns of Yahoo! Music wrote, "Unfortunately, over a third of the songs on this album are ballads, and most of them are fillers at that." Natalie Nichols of Los Angeles Times compared the album to a pinball machine and said that "listening to these 13 songs is a bit like pinging around inside one of those old-fashioned amusement devices. Giant grinding beats slam you from pole to pole, there are lots of flashy effects, the environment is completely artificial, and once the ball is launched, you can see exactly where it's going." Robert Christgau gave the album a "dud" rating in his Consumer Guide.

== Commercial performance ==
Black & Blue debuted at number one in the US Billboard 200 after selling 1.6 million copies in its first week at retail in the US. The feat made them the first act in history to achieve sales of more than a million copies in the first week with back-to-back releases. The album held the number-one spot in its second week, selling an additional 689,000 copies. On December 18, 2000, the album was certified eight times platinum by the Recording Industry Association of America for shipments of over eight million copies in the United States. As of March 2015, the album sold 5,936,000 copies in the US according to Nielsen Music. It also sold 992,000 units at the BMG Music Club as of February 2003.

Internationally, the album recorded the best sales in a week for an album in history by selling over 5 million copies in its first week of sales.

== Track listing ==
Black & Blue track listing
No.	Title	Writer(s)	Producer(s)	Length
1.	"The Call"	Max Martin; Rami Yacoub	Martin; Yacoub	3:25
2.	"Shape of My Heart"	Martin; Yacoub; Lisa Miskovsky	Martin; Yacoub	3:50
3.	"Get Another Boyfriend"	Martin; Yacoub	Martin; Yacoub	3:06
4.	"Shining Star"	Franciz & LePont; Nick Carter; Howie Dorough	Rodney Jerkins	3:24
5.	"I Promise You (With Everything I Am)"	Dan Hill	Timmy Allen	4:23
6.	"The Answer to Our Life"	Carter; Dorough; Brian Littrell; AJ McLean; Kevin Richardson	Per Magnusson; David Kreuger	3:17
7.	"Everyone"	Kristian Lundin; Andreas Carlsson	Lundin	3:31
8.	"More than That"	Franciz & LePont; Adam Anders	Franciz & LePont	3:45
9.	"Time"	Carter; Dorough; Littrell; McLean; Richardson	Babyface	3:56
10.	"Not for Me"	Lundin; Jake Schulze; Carlsson	Lundin	3:15
11.	"Yes I Will"	McLean; Brian Kierulf; Josh Schwartz	Allen; Larry "Rock" Campbell	3:51
12.	"It's True"	Martin; Carlsson; Richardson	Magnusson; Kreuger	4:15
13.	"How Did I Fall in Love with You?"	Dorough; Calum MacColl; Andrew Fromm	Allen	4:04
Total length:				47:53

UK / Japan / Australian bonus tracks
No.	Title	Writer(s)	Producer(s)	Length
13.	"What Makes You Different (Makes You Beautiful)"	Dorough; Steve Diamond; Carlsson	Allen; Renn	3:33
14.	"How Did I Fall in Love with You"	Dorough; Calum MacColl; Andrew Fromm	Allen; Renn	4:04
15.	"All I Have to Give" (a cappella)	Full Force	David Thomas; Mark Kibble	3:48
Total length:				55:14

European limited edition bonus tracks
No.	Title	Writer(s)	Producer(s)	Length
14.	"All I Have to Give" (a cappella)	Full Force	Thomas; Kibble	3:48
15.	"Shape of My Heart" (Soul Solution Radio Mix)	Martin; Rami; Miskovsky	Martin; Rami; Bobby Guy^{[a]}; Ernie Lake^{[a]}; Dorough^{[b]}; Giuseppe D.^{[b]}	2:51
16.	"The Call" (The Neptunes Remix) (featuring Clipse)	Martin; Rami	Martin; Rami; Ken Duro Ifill^{[a]}	3:53
Total length:				54:21

Asian Secret Diary tour edition bonus DVD
No.	Title	Length
1.	"Opening Sequence"
2.	"Band Introductions"
3.	"MTV Fanatic Segment"
4.	"MTV Cribs with AJ"
5.	"Around the World Tour Documentary"
6.	"Shape of My Heart" (Live at the MTV Music Video Awards)
7.	"Shape of My Heart" (Live in Times Square)

Notes

- ^{^[a]} signifies a remixer
- ^{^[b]} signifies an additional producer

== Personnel ==
Credits for Black & Blue adapted from AllMusic and album's liner notes.

Backstreet Boys

- Nick Carter
- Howie Dorough
- Brian Littrell
- AJ McLean
- Kevin Richardson

Additional personnel

- Jamie Allen – assistant engineer (tracks 5, 8, 11, 13)
- Timmy Allen – arrangements (track 13)
- John Amatiello – assistant engineer (track 1), Pro Tools engineer (tracks 1–3), XBS optical vocal enhancer engineer (track 2)
- Alan Armitage – engineer (tracks 5, 11, 13)
- Keith Armstrong – assistant engineer (track 4)
- Babyface – keyboards, drum programming, guitar, and background vocals (track 9)
- Adam Barber – engineer (tracks 5, 8, 13)
- Tony Battaglia – acoustic guitars (track 5)
- Kyle Bess – assistant mixing engineer (track 9)
- Stefan Boman – vocal engineer (track 2)
- Paul Boutin – engineer (track 9)
- Randy Bowland – guitar (track 11)
- Jimmy Bralower – additional drum programming (track 5)
- Bob Brown – engineer (track 4)
- Larry "Rock" Campbell – instrumentation (track 11)
- Tom Coyne – mastering
- Toby Dearborn – assistant engineer (tracks 4, 5, 13), assistant vocal engineer (track 7)
- Howie Dorough – additional vocal and musical arrangements (track 13)
- Nathan East – bass (track 9)
- Dona Kay Flint – string contractor (tracks 5, 13)
- Paul Foley – engineer (track 4)
- Fraciz – mixing (track 8)
- Nick Gamma – art direction
- Jon Gass – mixing (track 9)
- Johan Gunnarsson – engineer, assistant mix engineer, and strings engineer (track 8)
- Mick Guzauski – mixing (track 13)
- Chris Haggerty – digital editing
- Charles L. Infante – set design
- Henrik Janson – guitar (track 1), string arrangements and conducting (track 8)
- Ulf Janson – string arrangements and conducting (track 8)
- Rodney Jerkins – instrumentation (track 4)
- John Katalenic – orchestration (track 5), piano and string arrangements (track 13)
- David Krueger – engineer (tracks 6, 12), keyboards and programming (track 6), arrangements and additional programming (track 12)
- L.A. East Studio String Orchestra – orchestra (tracks 5, 13)
- LePont – mixing (track 8)
- Thomas Lindberg – bass (tracks 2, 6, 7)
- Bernard Löhr – mixing (tracks 6, 12)
- Gustave Lund – percussion (track 6)
- Kristian Lundin – engineer and mixing (tracks 7, 10)
- Per Magnusson – engineer, keyboards, and programming (tracks 6, 12); arrangements (track 12)
- Max Martin – engineer and mixing (tracks 1–3), guitars (track 2), instrumentation (track 3)
- Charles McCrorey – assistant mix engineer (track 11)
- Scott McMahon – hair stylist, make-up
- Jackie Murphy – art direction
- Mads Nilsen – mixing (track 8)
- Björn Norén – assistant strings engineer (track 8)
- Esbjörn Öhrwall – guitars (tracks 2, 6, 7, 12)
- Paul Oliveira – assistant mix engineer (track 5)
- Flip Osman – Pro Tools editing and assistant mix engineer (track 4)
- Edward Quesada – assistant engineer (track 9)
- Rami – engineer and mixing (tracks 1–3), instrumentation (track 3)
- Chris Resig – photography
- Veit Renn – arrangements (track 13), string arrangements (track 5)
- Rachel Zoe Rosenzweig – stylist
- Kyle Scholler – assistant engineer (tracks 5, 13)
- Jake Schulze – engineer and mixing (track 10)
- Dexter Simmons – mixing (track 4)
- Ivy Skoff – production coordinator (track 9)
- George Spatta – engineer (tracks 5, 11, 13)
- Stockholm Session Strings – strings (tracks 1, 8)
- Shane Stoneback – assistant engineer and assistant mix engineer (track 11)
- Peter Svensson – guitars (track 2)
- Leeza Taylor – photography
- Michael Thompson – guitar (track 9)
- Randy Thornton – conductor (tracks 5, 13)
- Chris Trevett – engineer (track 11), mixing (tracks 5, 11)
- Michael Tucker – vocal engineer (track 7)
- Clayton Wariner – second string engineer (tracks 5, 13)
- Dirk Woodruff – string engineer (tracks 5, 13)
- Marcelo Zolessi – assistant engineer (tracks 5, 13)

== Charts ==
=== Weekly charts ===
Weekly chart performance for Black & Blue
Chart (2000)	Peak position
Argentine Albums (CAPIF)	4
Australian Albums (ARIA)	2
Australian Dance Albums (ARIA)	1
Austrian Albums (Ö3 Austria)	3
Belgian Albums (Ultratop Flanders)	11
Belgian Albums (Ultratop Wallonia)	24
Canadian Albums (Billboard)	1
Colombian Albums (ASINCOL)	10
Danish Albums (Hitlisten)	2
Dutch Albums (Album Top 100)	2
European Albums Chart	2
Finnish Albums (Suomen virallinen lista)	2
German Albums (Offizielle Top 100)	1
Greek Albums (IFPI)	2
Hungarian Albums (MAHASZ)	11
Icelandic Albums (Tonlist)	7
Irish Albums (IRMA)	11
Italian Albums (FIMI)	6
Italian Albums (Musica e Dischi)	7
Japanese Albums (Oricon)	3
Malaysian Albums (IFPI)	1
New Zealand Albums (RMNZ)	10
Norwegian Albums (VG-lista)	5
Portuguese Albums (AFP)	4
Scottish Albums (Official Charts)	12
Singapore Albums (SPVA)	1
Spanish Albums (Promusicae)	1
Swedish Albums (Sverigetopplistan)	3
Swiss Albums (Schweizer Hitparade)	1
UK Albums (Official Charts)	13
US Billboard 200	1

=== Year-end charts ===
2000 year-end chart performance for Black & Blue
Chart (2000)	Position
Australian Albums (ARIA)	25
Canadian Albums (Nielsen SoundScan)	6
Dutch Albums (Album Top 100)	52
German Albums (Offizielle Top 100)	62
Italian Albums (Musica e dischi)	52
South Korean International Albums (MIAK)	13
Spanish Albums (PROMUSICAE)	37
Swiss Albums (Schweizer Hitparade)	40

2001 year-end chart performance for Black & Blue
Chart (2001)	Position
Austrian Albums (Ö3 Austria)	63
Canadian Albums (Nielsen SoundScan)	54
European Albums (Music & Media)	34
German Albums (Offizielle Top 100)	73
Swiss Albums (Schweizer Hitparade)	60
US Billboard 200	3

== Certifications and sales ==
Region	Certification	Certified units/sales
Argentina (CAPIF)	Platinum	60,000^{^}
Australia (ARIA)	Platinum	70,000^{^}
Austria (IFPI Austria)	Gold	25,000^{*}
Belgium (BRMA)	Gold	25,000^{*}
Brazil (Pro-Música Brasil)	Platinum	250,000^{*}
Denmark (IFPI Danmark)	3× Platinum	60,000^{‡}
Finland (Musiikkituottajat)	Gold	26,601
Germany (BVMI)	3× Gold	450,000^{^}
Japan (RIAJ)	3× Platinum	600,000^{^}
Mexico (AMPROFON)	2× Platinum	350,000
Netherlands (NVPI)	Platinum	80,000^{^}
New Zealand (RMNZ)	Platinum	15,000^{^}
Norway (IFPI Norway)	Gold	25,000^{*}
Portugal (AFP)	Platinum	40,000^{^}
Singapore	—	45,000
South Korea	—	151,885
Spain (Promusicae)	2× Platinum	200,000^{^}
Sweden (GLF)	Platinum	80,000^{^}
Switzerland (IFPI Switzerland)	Platinum	50,000^{^}
United Kingdom (BPI)	Gold	100,000^{^}
United States (RIAA)	8× Platinum	6,928,000 (Note: As of March 2015, the album has sold 5,936,000 copies in the US according to Nielsen SoundScan, which does not count albums sold through clubs like the BMG Music Club, where it sold 992,000 units as of February 2003. Combined, it has sold over 6,928,000 copies in the United States.)
Uruguay (CUD)	Platinum	6,000^{^}
^{*} Sales figures based on certification alone.^{^} Shipments figures based on certification alone.^{‡} Sales+streaming figures based on certification alone.

== See also ==
- List of best-selling albums
- List of fastest-selling albums
