= Backstreet Boys =

American vocal group

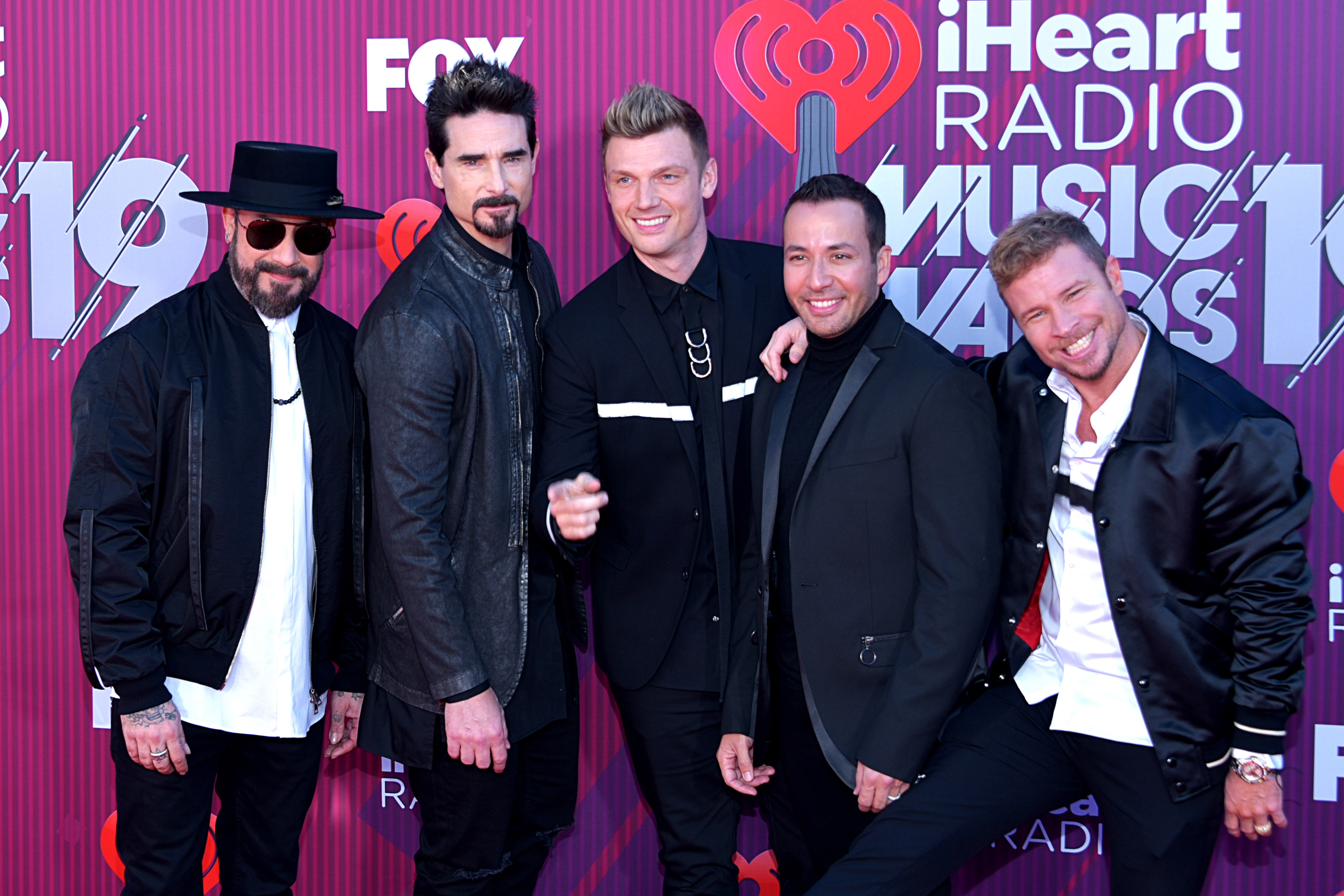
- Backstreet Boys at the 2019 iHeartRadio Music Awards in Los Angeles. From left: AJ McLean, Kevin Richardson, Nick Carter, Howie Dorough, and Brian Littrell

Background information
- Origin: Orlando, Florida, U.S.
- Genres: Pop; dance-pop; R&B; teen pop; adult contemporary; pop rock
- Works: Discography
- Years active: 1993–present
- Labels: K-BAHN; RCA; Jive; BMG; Legacy
- Spinoffs: NKOTBSB
- Awards: Full list
- Members: Nick Carter; Howie Dorough; AJ McLean; Brian Littrell; Kevin Richardson
- Website: backstreetboys.com

Backstreet Boys (often abbreviated as BSB) are an American vocal group and pop boy band consisting of Nick Carter, Howie Dorough, AJ McLean, and cousins Brian Littrell and Kevin Richardson. The band formed in 1993 in Orlando, Florida.

The group rose to fame with their debut album, Backstreet Boys (1996). In the following year, they released their second album, Backstreet's Back (1997), along with their self-titled American album, Backstreet Boys (1997), which continued the group's worldwide success. They rose to superstardom with their third studio album Millennium (1999), anchored by the worldwide hit "I Want It That Way" and its follow-up album, Black & Blue (2000). They also released a greatest hits album, The Hits – Chapter One (2001). After a two-year hiatus, they regrouped and released a comeback album, Never Gone (2005). After the conclusion of the Never Gone Tour in 2006, Richardson left the group to pursue other interests. The group then released two albums as a quartet: Unbreakable (2007) and This Is Us (2009).

Richardson rejoined the group in 2012. In 2013, they celebrated their 20th anniversary and released their first independent album, In a World Like This. Their follow-up album DNA (2019) debuted at number one, nineteen years after they last topped the chart in 2000. They also became the first boy band to top the U.S. album charts in three decades. In 2022, they released their first Christmas album, A Very Backstreet Christmas. They celebrated their 30th anniversary on April 20, 2023. In July 2025, they released Millennium 2.0, a reissued and remastered version of their third album, Millennium, with additional B-sides, live tracks, and demos.

The Backstreet Boys have sold over 150 million records worldwide, making them the best-selling boy band of all time and one of the world's best-selling music artists. They are the first group since Led Zeppelin to have their first ten albums reach the top 10 on the Billboard 200, and the only boy band to do so. The albums Backstreet Boys and Millennium were both certified diamond by the Recording Industry Association of America (RIAA), making them one of the few bands to have multiple diamond albums. The group received a star on the Hollywood Walk of Fame on April 22, 2013 (2 days after their 20th anniversary). They released a documentary film, titled Backstreet Boys: Show 'Em What You're Made Of in January 2015. In March 2017, the group began a concert residency in Las Vegas that lasted two years, titled Backstreet Boys: Larger Than Life. In July 2025, they launched their second Las Vegas residency, Backstreet Boys: Into the Millennium, at the Sphere.

== History ==
=== 1993–1995: Formation and early years ===
Howie Dorough and AJ McLean, natives of Orlando, Florida, met through a mutual vocal coach and later discovered Nick Carter through auditions. The three, realizing they could harmonize, decided to form a trio. Cousins Kevin Richardson and Brian Littrell, both from Lexington, Kentucky, sang in local church choirs and festivals when they were children. Richardson moved to Orlando in 1990, where he worked at Walt Disney World and concentrated on music at night.

In 1992, Lou Pearlman placed an ad in the Orlando Sentinel to create a vocal group with the "New Kids on the Block" look with a "Boyz II Men Sound". McLean, who was the first to audition for Pearlman in his living room, became the group's first member. Between late 1992 and March 1993, Pearlman held open casting calls and hundreds of young performers auditioned at his blimp hangar in Kissimmee, Florida. Ultimately, Carter, Dorough, and Richardson were selected after meeting Pearlman's expectations. Littrell flew from Kentucky to Orlando to formally join the group on April 20, 1993, a day after receiving a phone call from Richardson about it. Thus, April 20 became their anniversary date. Pearlman decided to call them Backstreet Boys, after Orlando's Backstreet Market, an outdoor flea market near International Drive which was also a teen hangout.

The Backstreet Boys performed their first show at SeaWorld Orlando on May 8, 1993. The group then continued to perform in various venues during summer 1993, from shopping malls, restaurants, to a high-profile charity gala in Fort Lauderdale, Florida. With a change in management in the fall, they began to tour schools across the U.S., building a fan base while trying to get a record deal. Mercury Records nearly signed them in 1993, but the deal fell through at the last minute because longtime Mercury recording artist John Mellencamp threatened to leave the label if they got into the boy band business. In February 1994, Jeff Fenster (then senior VP A&R Zomba/JIVE Records) and David Renzer (then senior VP/GM of Zomba Music Publishing) saw the group performing at a high school in Cleveland and signed them to their first record deal.

At the end of December 1994, the group flew to Sweden to record with Max Martin and Denniz PoP, including "We've Got It Goin' On," which ended up being their first single and completed their work in January 1995. "We've Got It Goin' On" was sent to radio in August 1995 and released as a physical single on September 5, 1995. In North America, Mix 96 in Montreal broke the group after the programmers heard it on the radio in Europe. The song was a minor success in the U.S., peaking at only No. 69 by December 1995, but it entered the top 5 in Germany, Switzerland, Austria, France, and the Netherlands. European success sent them there on a summer tour and shifted their promotion to mainly being done in Europe.

=== 1996–1997: Debut, worldwide success and Backstreet's Back ===
The group finished recording their first album Backstreet Boys in the spring of 1996. It was released internationally on May 6, 1996, excluding U.S. and Canada; however, it was later released in Canada in October 1996. Their popularity grew in Europe. "I'll Never Break Your Heart" reached Gold status in Germany, selling 250,000 copies. They were voted the No. 1 international group there in 1996. They also earned their first platinum record in Germany in 1996 for selling 500,000 copies of their debut album. Shortly after that, they began touring Asia and Canada. They also became one of the most successful debut artists in the world, collecting awards such as Durchstarter (Best Newcomers) in Germany's Viva Comet Awards in 1996. "Anywhere for You" was released as the last single from their international debut album on February 17, 1997. "Quit Playing Games (with My Heart)", initially released in Europe as their fourth single in October 1996, was released in the U.S. in May 1997 for their self-titled U.S. debut album. It peaked at No. 2 on the Billboard Hot 100, eventually earning a platinum award for selling over 1,000,000 copies.

The group began working on their second album, Backstreet's Back, in October 1996. They also recorded the song "If You Stay" for the Booty Call soundtrack in the same year, which was released in February 1997. Backstreet's Back was released internationally (except in the U.S.) on August 11, 1997. Their self-titled U.S. debut album, Backstreet Boys (1997), which consisted of songs from their 1996 international debut album and Backstreet's Back, was released in the U.S. a day later, on August 12, 1997. The U.S. self-titled debut peaked at No. 4 on the U.S. album chart and eventually sold 14 million copies. Meanwhile, the second international release, Backstreet's Back, peaked at No. 1 in Germany, Norway, Switzerland, Finland, the Netherlands, Belgium, and Austria, selling well over five million copies in Europe alone. The most successful singles from Backstreet's Back and the U.S. debut album were "Everybody (Backstreet's Back)" and "As Long As You Love Me". The two self-titled albums, the international debut and the U.S. debut, sold more than 28 million copies worldwide.

In November 1997, doctors discovered that a congenital hole in Littrell's heart had enlarged to dangerous proportions. Littrell postponed open-heart surgery to meet touring obligations. He underwent heart surgery on May 8, 1998, in the middle of the Backstreet's Back Tour. The group postponed the tour until July 1998 to give Littrell time to recover.

=== 1998–1999: Lawsuit against Pearlman, Millennium and superstardom ===
Littrell filed a lawsuit against Lou Pearlman and Trans Continental in 1998, claiming that Pearlman had not been truthful about the group's earnings. From 1993 to 1997, Pearlman and his company took about $10 million in revenue while the band only got $300,000. In the following year, McLean, Richardson, and Dorough joined the lawsuit, which eventually resulted in several settlements.

On Valentine's Day 1998, the group debuted in Latin America at the Viña del Mar International Song Festival in Chile. Later that year, on October 7, 1998, the group received the keys to the city from the mayor of Orlando in honor of the tornado relief concert the group headlined in March that raised over $250,000. The day was also declared "Backstreet Boys Day" in Orlando. They also began recording their third studio album, Millennium, at the beginning of that month while in the midst of a lawsuit. The worldwide hit single "I Want It That Way", which topped the singles charts in over 25 countries, made anticipation for Millennium high. Millennium was released on May 18, 1999, on which day the Backstreet Boys made a heavily publicized appearance on MTV's Total Request Live.

The album entered the Billboard 200 at No. 1 and sold 1,134,000 copies in its first week of release. Four singles were released from Millennium: "I Want It That Way", which is widely regarded as one of the greatest pop songs of all time, "Larger than Life", "Show Me the Meaning of Being Lonely", and "The One". Millennium became the best-selling album of 1999 in the U.S., selling 9,445,732 copies. It also holds the record for most shipments in one year, with 11 million shipments. Millennium remained on the Billboard chart for 93 weeks, eventually selling over 12 million copies in the United States and being certified 13 times platinum. As of January 2013, the album stands as the fourth-best selling album in the U.S. of the SoundScan era.

On June 2, 1999, the Backstreet Boys embarked on the Into the Millennium Tour, which comprised 115 sold-out shows in 84 cities, with some additional dates scheduled due to high demand. The second leg, which was sponsored by Sears, sold out on August 14, its sale date, and broke sales records. The concert at Georgia Dome, Atlanta, was the 5th-most attended concert in American history and the most attended concert by a pop artist.

By October 1999, the Backstreet Boys faced new problems, declaring their current JIVE contract null and void, soon striking one of the largest record deals ever – valued at $60 million with JIVE.

=== 2000–2001: Black and Blue and The Hits – Chapter One ===
The group members made a trip to the Bahamas in May 2000 to write songs for their fourth album. They began recording the album on July 1, 2000, in Stockholm, Sweden, and wrapped up the recording sessions in September. A song completed during the July recording sessions, "It's True", was released on August 28, 2000, in a compilation album sold exclusively at Burger King restaurants, titled For the Fans.

The album, Black & Blue, was released on November 21, 2000. The album recorded the best international sales in a week for an album in history by selling over 5 million copies in its first week. In the United States, it sold 1.6 million discs in the first week making them the first artist since the Beatles to achieve back-to-back million plus first week sales. To promote its release, they traveled around the world in 100 hours, visiting Stockholm, Tokyo, Sydney, Cape Town, Rio de Janeiro, and New York City. Fifty-five hours were spent traveling, and 45 were spent making public appearances. A DVD of the short tour was released in 2001, titled Around the World. Three singles were released from Black & Blue: "Shape of My Heart", "The Call", and "More than That".

On January 28, 2001, the Backstreet Boys performed the American national anthem at the Super Bowl XXXV in Tampa, Florida. A week earlier, the group began the "Black & Blue Tour," which featured shows in five continents. The tour was put on hold in July when it was reported that McLean had entered rehab to battle alcoholism and depression after Richardson held an intervention for him at a Boston hotel. The tour resumed in August and concluded in November.

The Hits – Chapter One, their first compilation album, was released on October 23, 2001. It also included a previously unreleased song, "Drowning". The album entered the top 5 in the U.S., UK, Germany, and Canada, and the top 10 in Switzerland, Austria, the Netherlands, and New Zealand. In the U.S., The Hits: Chapter One was certified platinum for selling over one million copies. It was also certified platinum by IFPI for selling over one million copies in Europe. "Drowning" reached top 10 in many countries and as of 2002, the album had sold almost six million worldwide.

=== 2002–2003: Hiatus ===
In 2002, the group expressed a strong desire to leave their management company, The Firm. However, Carter chose to remain with The Firm to manage his solo career. Shortly afterward, the rest of the group began recording their next album without him. The relationship with JIVE Records worsened when the Backstreet Boys filed a $75–100 million lawsuit against Zomba Music Group (JIVE's parent company), claiming breach of contract. They claimed that the label promoted Carter's solo album Now or Never at the expense of the group.

In November 2003, McLean appeared on The Oprah Winfrey Show to talk about his addiction to alcohol and drugs and his struggles in rising to fame for the first time in public. The rest of the group surprised him by appearing in person to give him support, marking the first time the Backstreet Boys had appeared together in public in almost two years. The group began to reform and reconcile their differences, planning to start recording a comeback album at the beginning of the following year.

=== 2004–2006: Never Gone and Richardson's departure ===
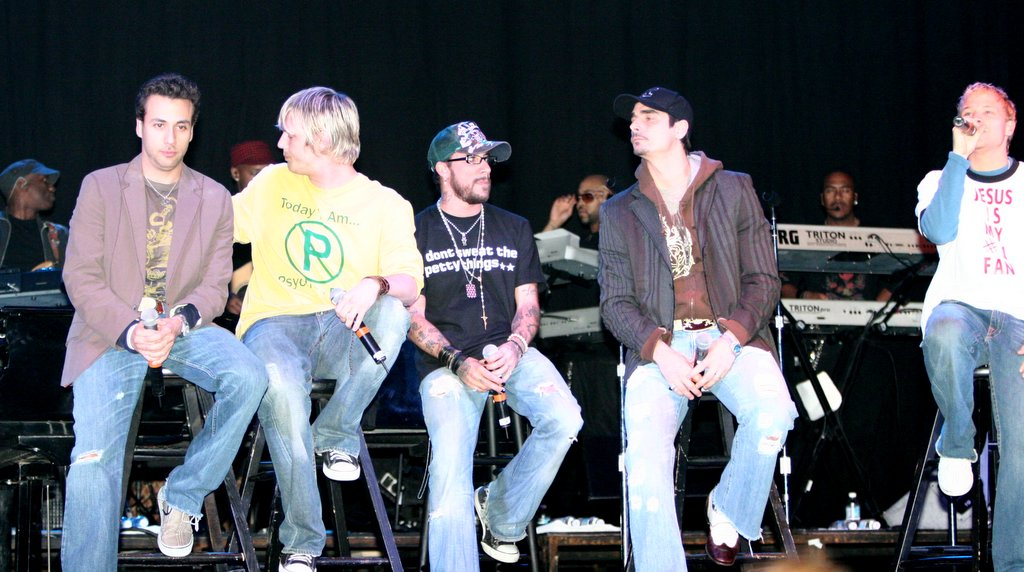
Backstreet Boys at KISS FM Jingle Bell Bash 8

In January 2004, the Backstreet Boys began working on their fifth studio album. The album's first single, "Incomplete," was released to radio stations on March 28, 2005. Following the release of the single, they embarked on their Up Close & Personal Tour in March. "Incomplete" peaked at number 13 on the U.S. Billboard Hot 100 and charted within the top 10 in 13 countries. It debuted at number one in Australia, becoming their first number-one hit in the country.

After recording for over a year, the Backstreet Boys released Never Gone on June 14, 2005. The album debuted at No. 3 on the U.S. chart with first-week sales of 291,000 copies. However, the drastic style change drew negative criticism from Rolling Stone. Never Gone was certified platinum in the U.S. with four singles released from the album. The second single, "Just Want You to Know," hit the top 10 in the UK. The third single was "Crawling Back to You" in the U.S. and "I Still..." worldwide. Never Gone has sold approximately 3 million copies worldwide.

The Backstreet Boys began the first leg of their Never Gone Tour on July 22, 2005, in West Palm Beach, Florida. After that, the first leg ran until November 2005 in Europe, and in January 2006, the second leg started in Tokyo, Japan. Finally, the tour concluded on February 2, 2006, in Melbourne, Australia.

On June 23, 2006, it was announced that Richardson had left the Backstreet Boys to pursue other interests. Both Richardson and the rest of the group stated on their official site, stating that he departed amicably and the door was always open for him to return. Following Richardson's departure, the group turned down an offer to star in a reality show to find a new member and stated that they were not planning to replace him.

=== 2007–2011: Unbreakable, This Is Us, and NKOTBSB ===
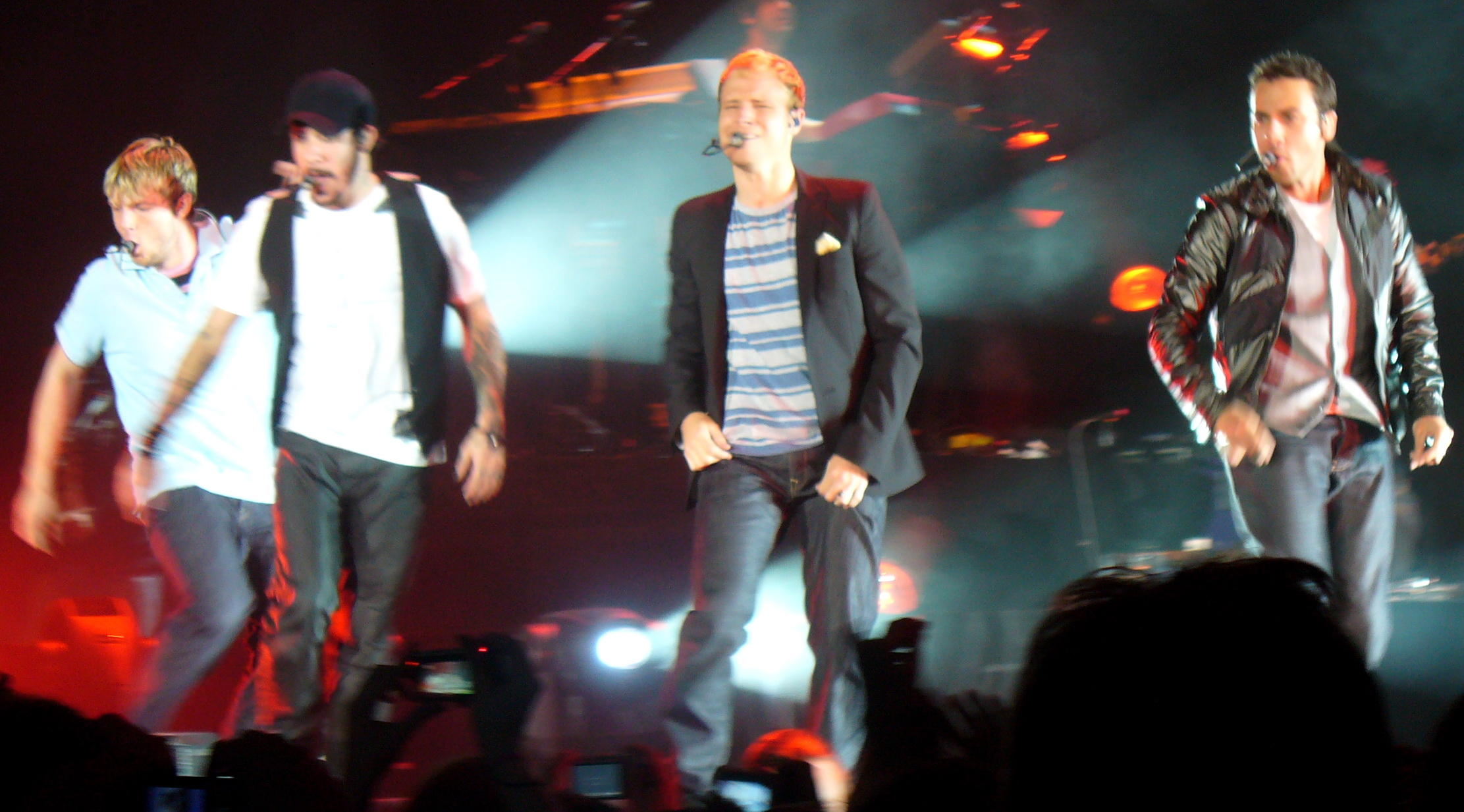
Backstreet Boys performing without Richardson on Unbreakable Tour

Two days after Richardson's departure announcement, the Backstreet Boys entered the studio to record their sixth album. The album titled Unbreakable was released on October 30, 2007. It received positive reviews and debuted at number seven on the Billboard 200, selling 81,000 copies in its first week of release. In Japan, it debuted at No. 1 on the Japanese Oricon weekly album charts and remained there for another week. They released two singles from the album, "Inconsolable" and "Helpless When She Smiles." The group went on a worldwide tour, the Unbreakable Tour, to promote the release. The tour began in Tokyo, Japan, on February 16, 2008. Richardson rejoined the rest of the group on stage at the Palladium in Hollywood, Los Angeles, on November 23, 2008, for the last North American stop of the tour.

On October 6, 2009, the group released their next album, This Is Us. The album debuted at No. 9 on the Billboard 200, selling 42,000 copies in its first week of release. It peaked at No. 2 in Japan and was certified Platinum for shipments of 250,000 copies. Two singles were released from this album: "Straight Through My Heart" and "Bigger." The day before the album's release, it was reported that Littrell had contracted swine flu, causing the group to cancel a signing at Hard Rock Café in New York for the NYC Pinktober event on October 5, 2009. The group subsequently canceled a scheduled CBS Early Show performance the next day on October 6, 2009. In late October 2009, the group embarked on the This Is Us Tour, which lasted over a year and consisted of 123 shows.

The Backstreet Boys, including Richardson, filmed a segment for The Oprah Winfrey Show on October 22, 2010. Richardson performed with the group in the show's studio later that day, making it the second time he had performed with the group since his departure.

In May 2011, the group announced that they had left their longtime label JIVE Records. In the same month, they embarked on a joint tour with New Kids on the Block as NKOTBSB. Prior to the tour, they released a compilation album of their biggest hits, also titled NKOTBSB, which also includes a mash-up and two new songs. After 2011, the tour placed 17th on Billboard's annual "Top 25 Tours", earning over $40 million with 51 shows. The tour lasted until June 2012, comprising 80 shows in North America, Europe, Australia, and Asia. During the show in Staples Center, LA, in July 2011, Richardson once again joined the group on stage. Richardson also performed with the group as part of their second annual cruise in the Bahamas on December 3, 2011.

=== 2012–2015: Richardson's return, In a World Like This, and documentary film ===
The Backstreet Boys announced that Richardson had rejoined them permanently during a show in London on April 29, 2012. The Backstreet Boys moved into a house together in July 2012 as they started working on new material with producer Martin Terefe in London. On August 31, 2012, they closed out Good Morning America's Summer Concert Series in Central Park, in New York. The first single featuring Richardson's vocals in six years, a Christmas song titled "It's Christmas Time Again", was premiered on AOL Music on November 5, 2012, and officially released a day later. The song reached No. 1 on Billboard's Holiday Digital Songs chart.

The Backstreet Boys celebrated their 20th anniversary, which was on April 20, 2013, with a fan celebration event in Hollywood that day. They received a star on the Hollywood Walk of Fame two days later, and had the day, April 22, 2013, declared as Backstreet Boys Day in Hollywood. In May 2013, the group embarked on the In a World Like This Tour. The tour lasted over two years, comprising over 170 shows in North America, South America, Europe, Asia, Australia, and the Middle East. The tour was the 44th highest-grossing worldwide tour in 2014, with a total gross of $32.8 million and ticket sales of 607,407, not including its 2013 and 2015 dates.

"In a World Like This," the lead single from their eighth studio album, also titled In a World Like This, was released digitally on June 25, 2013. The album was released on July 30, 2013. It is the group's first independent album, released under their own label, K-BAHN. It reached the top 5 in the US, Canada, Netherlands, Germany, Switzerland, Spain, Taiwan, and Japan, and had sold 800,000 copies as of January 2015. They released a second single from the album, "Show 'Em (What You're Made Of)" in November 2013.

The group made a cameo in the 2013 movie This Is the End as a fictional version of themselves, performing their song "Everybody (Backstreet's Back)," which earned them an award for "Best Musical Moment" at 2014 MTV Movie Awards. In December 2013, the Backstreet Boys performed their two original Christmas songs as marquee performers in the annual "Christmas in Washington" TV special.

Their documentary movie, titled Backstreet Boys: Show 'Em What You're Made Of, was released in theaters and online on January 30, 2015, in the U.S., on February 26, 2015, in the UK and Europe, and on March 28 worldwide. The movie chronicles their entire career journey up to the making of their 2013 album In A World Like This.

On April 10, 2015, band members Richardson and Littrell were inducted into the Kentucky Music Hall of Fame.

=== 2015–2020: Las Vegas residency and DNA ===
In August 2015, band members Carter, Dorough, and McLean filmed a movie that Carter wrote entitled Dead 7. The film centers around a ragtag band of gunslingers operating during a post-apocalyptic zombie plague. The movie premiered on April 1, 2016, on Syfy channel. A free copy of the theme song "In the End" was released on March 28, performed by band members Nick Carter, AJ McLean and Howie Dorough; Joey Fatone and Chris Kirkpatrick from NSYNC; Jeff Timmons from 98 Degrees; and Erik-Michael Estrada from O-Town.

In October 2015, McLean revealed that the group was working on their ninth studio album. On January 29, 2016, the Backstreet Boys were the musical guests in the series finale of NBC comedy series Undateable. On April 1, 2016, Carter told Entertainment Tonight the group signed a deal with Live Nation for a nine-show "test residency" in Las Vegas. McLean confirmed the deal, telling Us Magazine that the residency would begin in January 2017. In July 2016, the group appeared and performed on ABC's Greatest Hits. On August 19, 2016, the group released "God, Your Mama, and Me", with country duo Florida Georgia Line, which was taken from their third studio album Dig Your Roots. The song entered the Hot 100 at No. 92 for the chart dated March 18, 2017, which was the group's first return to the chart since 2007.

On September 15, 2016, McLean and Carter confirmed that the band would be done with the album the following year, along with a new headlining tour. On September 23, the Backstreet Boys confirmed their Vegas residency show happening in 2017, titled Backstreet Boys: Larger Than Life. The residency played 80 shows between March 1, 2017, and April 27, 2019.

Backstreet Boys released their new song titled "Don't Go Breaking My Heart" on May 17, 2018, as their lead single for their new album. The album is co-produced under RCA Records and the group's own label, K-BAHN, and distributed by RCA's parent company, Sony Music. On November 9, they released the single "Chances" and announced the title of their ninth studio album, DNA, which was released on January 25, 2019. On January 4, 2019, DNA's third single, "No Place," was released. Backstreet Boys embarked on the DNA World Tour in support of the album on May 11, 2019. They had to postpone the tour on March 15, 2020, due to the coronavirus pandemic. They initially rescheduled the remaining dates for 2021, but eventually had to reschedule again for 2022.

On April 8, 2019, the band opened their exhibit at the Grammy Museum, which opened to the public two days later, showcasing tour outfits and memorabilia from their childhoods. That same month, the group announced that they would be releasing their first Christmas album. At their Las Vegas residency, they received keys to the Vegas strip as the mayor declared the 10th Backstreet Boys Day, and during the 20th anniversary of "I Want It That Way", the group participated in a handprint ceremony to commemorate the ending of their two-year residency at Planet Hollywood and were also presented with a check donation to the Boys & Girls Club of Southern Nevada.

On February 9, 2020, the band announced the second North America leg of the DNA World Tour on social media and Good Morning America. In December 2020, Britney Spears released a single featuring the group called "Matches".

=== 2021–present: A Very Backstreet Christmas and Millennium 2.0 ===
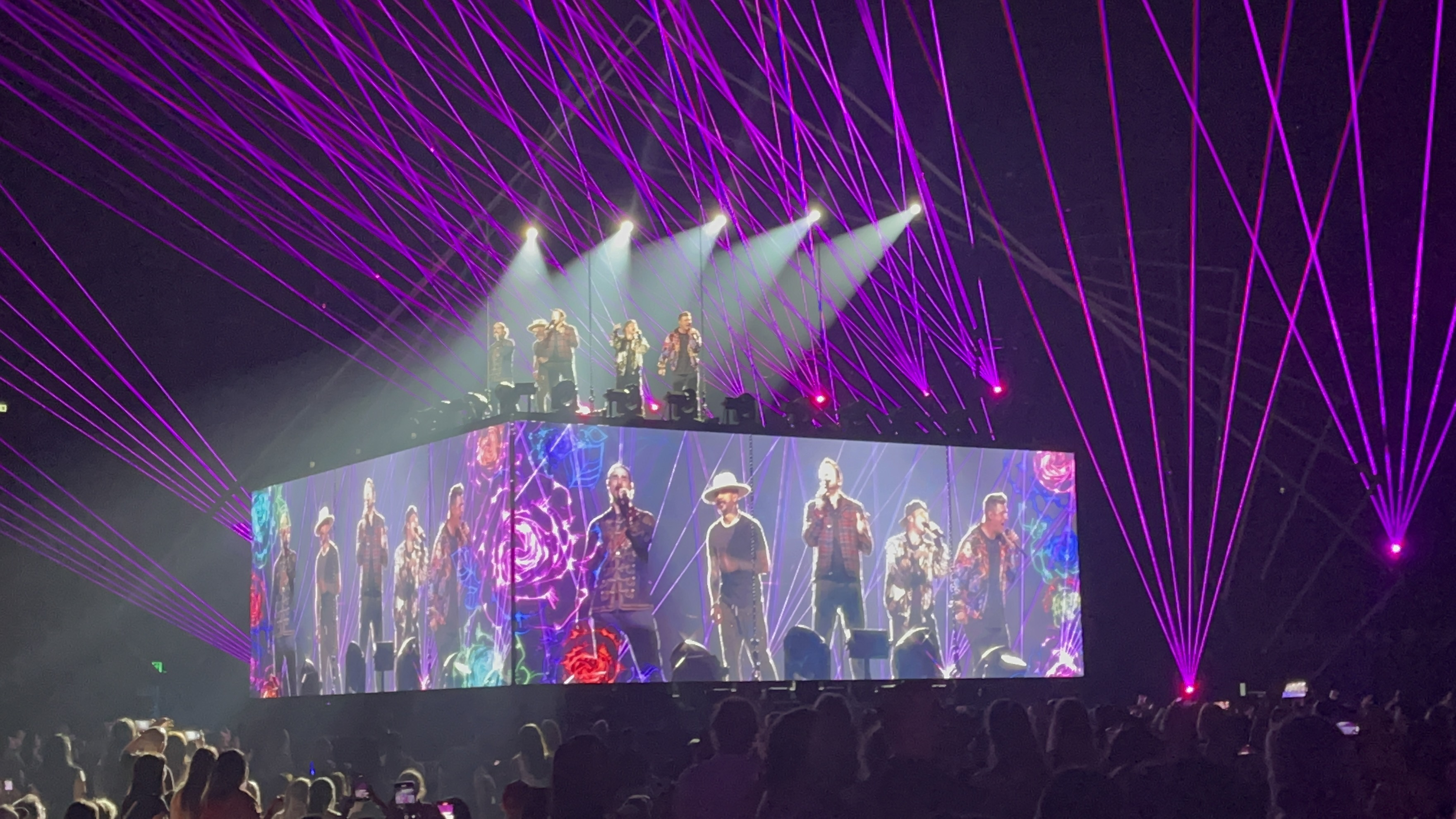
The Backstreet Boys performing in Sydney, Australia in March 2023

The Backstreet Boys started working on their first Christmas album in March 2021. Due to the pandemic, the album was rescheduled for release in late 2022, and the group canceled their 2021 holiday residency in Las Vegas. Backstreet Boys resumed their DNA tour in April 2022 in North America and finished in May 2023 in South Africa.

In October 2022, the group released their first holiday album, A Very Backstreet Christmas. It reached number 17 on the US Billboard 200 charts and number 1 on the Billboard Holiday charts. The first single from the album, "Last Christmas", hit number 1 on the Billboard AC charts, and the second single, "Christmas in New York", reached number 19. Following sexual assault allegations against Nick Carter, several appearances and publicity campaigns for the release were canceled, including the planned ABC television special, A Very Backstreet Holiday. Carter has since filed a defamation lawsuit for $2.5 million. In August 2024, court documents were made public which revealed that Carter claimed that Melissa Schuman's lawsuit against Carter cost the Backstreet Boys a seven-figure deal. On December 4, 2024, the band performed for the Christmas tree lighting at Christmas in Rockefeller Center live on NBC.

On February 12, 2025, the band announced a nine-show residency titled Into the Millennium at Sphere in the Las Vegas Valley. On February 14, three more dates were announced, bringing the total to twelve shows in July and August 2025. Nine more dates were added to the residency, making it a total of 21 shows.

To promote their second Las Vegas residency, the band has been lining up more sponsors and endorsements through Live Nation and Vibee with NASCAR, and collaboration with Legacy Motor Club. On April 27, 2025, the band performed at the Stagecoach Festival livestreamed on Twitch, Amazon Music, and Amazon Prime, with Luke Combs joining them on stage to sing their hit song. On May 8, the band performed at ACMs with Rascal Flatts, which was live-streamed on Twitch and Prime Video.

On July 11, 2025, the band released the reissued and remastered Millennium 2.0 with thirteen bonus tracks, including B-sides, live recordings, demos, and an alternate version of "I Want It That Way"; the album charted in six countries.

== Artistry and legacy ==
The Backstreet Boys have prided themselves on being a vocal harmony group. In order to fight the boy band stereotype and the backlash from New Kids on the Block's lip-sync scandal in the beginning, they would sing a cappella every chance they could get. The ad they answered in 1993 was for a singing group with "New Kids on the Block look with a Boyz II Men sound", and they aimed to have a white version of Boyz II Men. "We were fans of New Kids, but were we really modeled after them? No. We looked at ourselves as Shai, Jodeci, and Boyz II Men, the true vocal groups. That's who we listened to and who we really wanted to be like," Littrell stated in 2011. The Backstreet Boys often employ polyphonic harmony, which sets them apart from many other singing groups. Littrell, Carter, and McLean usually sing the melody in choruses, with Dorough harmonizing above the melody and Richardson covering the bass parts. During Richardson's absence, McLean and Carter together covered his part in choruses while Dorough took his solo parts, although McLean sang Richardson's verse in "Drowning".

The Backstreet Boys' musical style has evolved over the years. On their debut and second album, they sang a hybrid of R&B and dance club pop mixed with new jack balladry and hip-hop. With Millennium and Black & Blue, they started to abandon R&B and shift more toward pop and pop rock, as demonstrated on songs like "I Want It That Way," "Shape of My Heart," "Larger than Life," and "Not For Me". The group drastically changed their style in 2005 with their comeback album Never Gone, an adult contemporary record featuring only live instruments, a departure from their previous pop sound, which featured many synthesizers. Compared to their previous albums, Never Gone is "more organic, more stripped-down, less harmonies, more instrumentation". Their first album without Richardson, Unbreakable, is similar to Never Gone. It leans toward adult contemporary and contemporary pop music and features interwoven choral harmonies, piano, strings, guitar, and drums, with a little bit of hip-hop and reggae elements on some tracks, such as "One in a Million". With their seventh studio album, This Is Us, they went back to their original dance-pop beats combined with electropop. It also contains a more R&B sound compared to Unbreakable. The group's first independent album, In a World Like This, which is also their first album back with Richardson, is a mixture of modern pop, adult contemporary, and dance music, with a hint of singer-songwriter genre as demonstrated on "Try", "Madeleine", and "Trust Me". On DNA, they combined their harmony-driven contemporary pop sound with R&B, country, funk, and EDM.

== Partnerships and other ventures ==
The second leg of Into the Millennium Tour, which was also the first North American leg, was sponsored by Sears and was officially titled "Sears Presents Backstreet Boys Into The Millennium." The sponsorship was part of Sears' new integrated worldwide marketing campaign, which featured the Backstreet Boys exclusively. The campaign included a 30-second advertisement featuring the group and aired from August 1, 1999, to August 15, 1999. The advertising promoted a back-to-school sweepstakes giving five fans the chance to win a $2,000 Sears shopping spree with their favorite Backstreet Boys member and a trip for four to the group's concert on December 1, 1999, in Tampa, Florida.

Carter, a comic fan, met comic book writer Stan Lee through his manager at The Firm in February 2000. Carter subsequently told Lee about his original concept for a six-issue comic book series featuring members of the Backstreet Boys as superheroes called "Cyber Crusaders." Lee was interested in the concept; however, they ultimately decided to make it a single issue. The comic book, titled Backstreet Project, was released in 2000 and was available for purchase at their concerts and online stores in 2000–2001. In addition to the book, a series of flash-based webisodes was also published in 2000.

In January 2000, the Backstreet Boys signed a deal with Burger King. The deal included an exclusive compilation set available only at Burger King restaurants. The compilation consisted of three CDs featuring a new song called "It's True," live songs from the group's previous tours, and a VHS tape featuring backstage footage and interviews. In August 2000, it was announced that the deal would also include three TV commercials featuring the Backstreet Boys, and a promotion, which was the inclusion of an exclusive Backstreet Project Cyber Crusader toy in each Burger King Big Kids Meal and Kids Meal.

In August 2012, it was revealed that the Backstreet Boys would be starring in an Old Navy commercial. The commercial featuring the group started airing on September 19, 2012. "It was a great way to show people that we're back," Richardson said regarding the commercial. The group also performed at an Old Navy event "Fit For Fall Fashion Show for All" in Bryant Park, New York on September 14, 2012.

On March 12, 2014, the group filmed a series of commercials for the Swedish warehouse company NetOnNet while on tour in Europe. The commercials started airing in May 2014. For these commercials, the group recorded a song called "Lager Than Life", which is a remake of their song "Larger Than Life" with different instrumentation. The song was also released as a single on iTunes by the company in several countries.

During Super Bowl LIII in 2019, the band collaborated with Chance the Rapper on a commercial for Doritos corn snacks. The advertisement was poorly received; Rolling Stone called it "unwatchable".

In 2022, the Backstreet Boys began appearing in commercials for Downy Rinse and Refresh Detergent.

On June 24, 2022, American luxury carmaker Lincoln teamed up with the Backstreet Boys to hold a virtual concert from Philadelphia to WeChat (Weixin) users, mostly in China, which was broadcast by Tencent's WeChat channel. A total of 44.2 million viewers watched the live broadcast, according to Tencent. This marked the third-highest attendance for live-stream concerts on the WeChat channel and the highest audience record for such by international artists.

For Super Bowl 2026, the band did a commercial for T-Mobile, which received widespread praise in reviews.

== Charity ==
The group has supported multiple charities over the years, including Children's Miracle Network, City of Hope, Kids Wish, Live Together, and Lupus LA. On April 6, 2022, they donated $25,000 to young band First Day of School for them to donate to their three favorite charities. Individually they have given to charities, for example, Nick Carter hosted a sing-a-long holiday dinner for Home for the Holidays. On July 27, 2022, the group took part in Dave & Jimmy's Celebrity Softball Classic in Columbus, Ohio, for charity benefitting On Our Sleeves, the movement for children's mental health, powered by behavioral health experts at Nationwide Children's Hospital.

== Band members ==
- AJ McLean – vocals (baritone) (1993–present)
- Howie Dorough – vocals (tenor/falsetto) (1993–present)
- Nick Carter – vocals (tenor/baritone) (1993–present)
- Kevin Richardson – vocals (bass/baritone) (1993–2006, 2012–present)
- Brian Littrell – vocals (tenor/falsetto) (1993–present)

== Discography ==
- Backstreet Boys (1996)
- Backstreet's Back (1997)
- Millennium (1999)
- Black & Blue (2000)
- Never Gone (2005)
- Unbreakable (2007)
- This Is Us (2009)
- In a World Like This (2013)
- DNA (2019)
- A Very Backstreet Christmas (2022)

== Filmography ==
| Year | Title | Role | Notes | |
|---|---|---|---|---|
| 1993 | Star Search | Themselves | Performance | |
| 1997 | The View | Themselves | Performance | |
| 1998 | The View | Themselves | Performance | |
| 2001 | The View | Themselves | Performance | |
| 2005 | The View | Themselves | Performance | |
| 2012 | The View | Themselves | Performance | |
| 2013 | The View | Themselves | Performance | |
| 1998 | The Oprah Winfrey Show | Themselves | Interview & performance | |
| 2010 | The Oprah Winfrey Show | Themselves | Interview & performance | |
| 1998 | Sabrina The Teenage Witch | Cameo appearance | Episode: "The Band Episode" | |
| 1997 | Live With Regis and Kathie Lee | Themselves | Performance | |
| 1998 | Live With Regis and Kathie Lee | Themselves | Performance | |
| 1999 | Saturday Night Live | Themselves | Season 24, Episode 19 | |
| 1998 | The Rosie O'Donnell Show | Themselves | Performance | |
| 1999 | The Rosie O'Donnell Show | Themselves | Performance | |
| 2000 | The Rosie O'Donnell Show | Themselves | Performance | |
| 2001 | The Rosie O'Donnell Show | Themselves | Performance | |
| 1998-1999 | All That | Themselves | | |
| 2001 | Otro Rollo | Themselves | Performance, Special Guests | |
| 2005 | Otro Rollo | Themselves | Performance, Special Guests | |
| 2002 | Arthur | Themselves | Episode: "Arthur: It's Only Rock 'N' Roll" | |
| 2002 | Sesame Street | Themselves | Performance, Special Guests | |
| 2003 | The Oprah Winfrey Show | Themselves | The boys surprised A.J. McLean as he was talking about his drug addiction | |
| 2005 | Live With Regis and Kelly | Themselves | Performance, Guests at Disneyland | |
| 2007 | Live With Regis and Kelly | Themselves | Performance, Guests at Disneyland | |
| 2009 | El Hormiguero | Themselves, Guests | Musical Guest With The Backstreet Boys This Is Us | |
| 2012 | The Talk | Themselves | Performance/Interview | |
| 2013 | This Is the End | Cameo appearance | Appear at the end of the film performing "Everybody (Backstreet's Back)" with the cast. | |
| 2013 | El Hormiguero | Themselves, Guests | Talk Show New Disco | |
| 2015 | Backstreet Boys: Show 'Em What You're Made Of | Themselves | Documentary | |
| 2016 | Undateable | Themselves | Episode: Backstreet Boys Walk Into a Bar | |
| 2017 | Drop the Mic | Themselves | Episode: "Nicole Scherzinger vs. Lil Rel Howery / Charlie Puth vs. Backstreet Boys" | |
| 2018 | The Voice | Themselves | Season 15 Performance | |
| 2019 | Live with Kelly and Ryan | Themselves | Performance | |
| 2012 | Good Morning America | Themselves | Performance in Central Park | |
| 2013 | Good Morning America | Themselves | Interview & performance | |
| 2018 | Good Morning America | Themselves | Summer Concert Series | |
| 2019 | Good Morning America | Themselves | Interview & performance | |
| 2020 | Good Morning America | Themselves | Interview & performance | |
| 2020 | Watch What Happens Live with Andy Cohen | Themselves | Episode 16, season 17 | |
| July 10, 1999 | Disney Channel in Concert | Themselves | Special | |
| 2022 | The Kelly Clarkson Show | Themselves | | |
| 2005 | The Ellen DeGeneres Show | Themselves | Interview and performance | |
| 2017 | The Ellen DeGeneres Show | Themselves | Performance with Florida Georgia Line | |
| 2018 | The Ellen DeGeneres Show | Themselves | Interview and performance | |
| 2009 | Jimmy Kimmel Live! | Themselves | Performances | |
| 2013 | Jimmy Kimmel Live! | Themselves | Performances | |
| 2019 | Jimmy Kimmel Live! | Themselves | Performances | |
| 2019 | The Tonight Show Starring Jimmy Fallon | Themselves | Performance / Interview | |
| 2020 | The Tonight Show Starring Jimmy Fallon | Themselves | Performance / Interview | |
| October 4, 1997 | Today | Themselves | Performance / Interview | |
| 2001 | Today | Themselves | Performance / Interview | |
| June 10, 2005 | Today | Themselves | Performance / Interview | |
| January 27–28, 2015 | Today | Themselves | Performance / Interview | Interview about the documentary |
| February 14, 2025 | Today | Themselves | Performance / Interview | |
| 1999 | The Early Show | Themselves | Interview | |
| 2001 | The Early Show | Themselves | Interview | |

== Awards ==
The group has received nine Grammy Award nominations as of 2019, including five nominations in 2000. The group has also received two American Music Awards, five Billboard Music Awards, two MTV Video Music Awards, a Juno Award, and many others.

== Tours ==
Headlining

- We Wanna Be with You Tour (1995–1996)
- Backstreet Boys: Live in Concert Tour (1996–1997)
- Backstreet's Back Tour (1997–1998)
- Into the Millennium Tour (1999–2000)
- Black & Blue World Tour (2001)
- Never Gone Tour (2005–2006)
- Unbreakable Tour (2008–2009)
- This Is Us Tour (2009–2011)
- In a World Like This Tour (2013–2015)
- DNA World Tour (2019–2024)

Co-headlining

- NKOTBSB Tour (with New Kids on the Block) (2011–2012)

Residencies

- Backstreet Boys: Larger Than Life (2017–2019)
- Backstreet Boys: Into the Millennium (2025–2027)
- Backstreet Boys: Into The Millennium Homecoming: Live In Germany (2026)
- Backstreet Boys: Into The Millenium Homecoming: Live In Canada (2027)

== See also ==
- List of best-selling music artists
- List of best-selling boybands
- List of best-selling music artists in the United States
- List of best-selling albums in the United States
- List of best-selling albums
- List of best-selling albums in the United States of the Nielsen SoundScan era
- List of most expensive music videos
- Forbes list of highest-earning musicians
