= Kids Wish Network =

Non-profit organization in the USA

- Founded: 1997
- Founder: Mark Breiner; Shelley Breiner; Barbara Askin
- Location: Holiday, Florida, United States
- Region served: Worldwide
- Key people: Mark Breiner executive director 1997- 2010
- Employees: 51 in 2013
- Website: kidswishnetwork.org

Kids Wish Network is a 501(c)(3) non-profit organization that grants wishes to children with life-threatening medical conditions. It has been the subject of negative publicity throughout its history, including accusations of trademark infringement, tax avoidance and inefficient fundraising practices. It was named "the worst charity in the nation" in a 2013 review of charities with wasteful spending practices. In 2012, of the $18.6 million the Kids Wish Network raised, only $240,000 was spent on granting wishes.

== Background ==
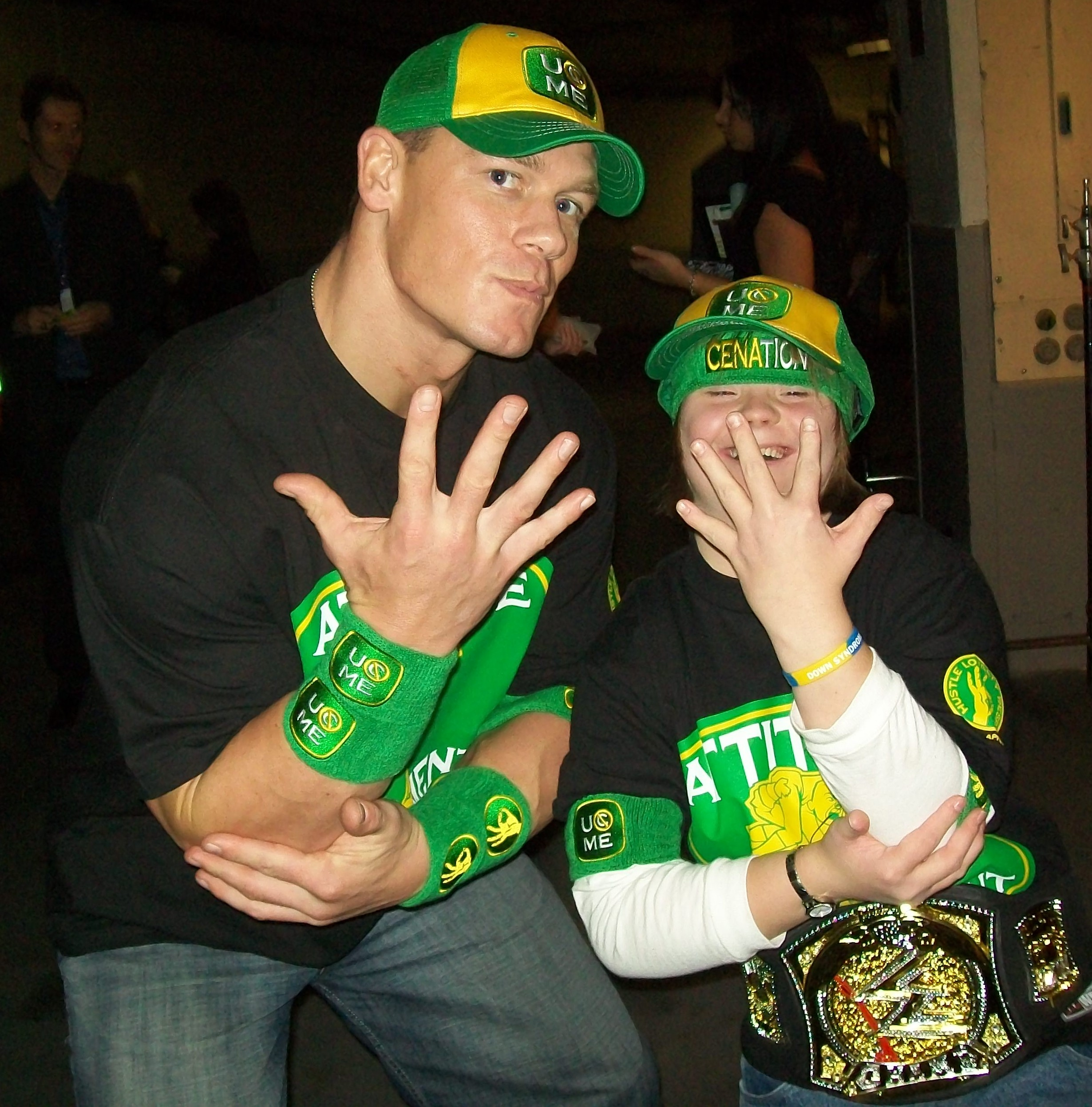
Wrestler John Cena during a wish granted in 2009

The Kids Wish Network was founded in 1997 as the "Fulfill a Wish Foundation" by Mark Breiner, his wife Shelley Breiner and Shelley's mother Barbara Askin in honor of Shelley's father, who died of cancer in 1993. In 1998, the company's name was changed to "Kids Wish Network" as part of a settlement after the Make-A-Wish Foundation sued the organization on the premise that it had a confusingly similar name.

The organization's beneficiaries are children between the ages of 3 and 18 who have overcome life-altering circumstances, often enduring a great deal of pain and suffering. In 2004, it had granted 143 wishes and in 2013 it granted 800 wishes. But in other cases, parents have accused the organization of exploiting their children to generate money without actually providing any benefit to the child.

Some of its wishes have been granted by celebrities such as musician Brad Paisley, professional wrestler John Cena, R&B artist Keyshia Cole, NFL coach Jon Gruden, singer-songwriter Taylor Swift, and the Green Bay Packers.

== Fundraising ==
In 2008, Charity Navigator gave Kids Wish Network zero out of four stars in its "efficiency rating" based on how much money is spent on fundraising in comparison to charitable activities. The American Institute of Philanthropy also gave it a failing "F" grade. Kids Wish Network claimed the fundraising spending was needed for new non-profits to develop a donor base. A Charity Navigator spokesperson alleged the Kids Wish Network was taking advantage of tax loopholes for non-profits by counting some of its fundraising activities as charity work and that it had the highest percent of funds spent on fundraising out of all 24 wish-granting charities. Representatives of the charity said comparing them to other wish-granting services was unfair, since they also provide funeral services and other services. Kids Wish Network has received higher marks in other areas, for example receiving four stars for organizational capacity the prior year.

== America's worst charities (2013 and beyond) ==
In 2012 the Tampa Bay Times, CNN and the Center for Investigative Reporting undertook a year long joint investigation of "America's Worst Charities" which ranked Kids Wish Network at the top of the list of the worst charities in the United States. based on percentage of money collected from donors that was paid to corporate telemarketing solicitors from 2003 to 2013. Thirty philanthropy experts were interviewed for this series. (Note: Others contributors to this article include Caryn Baird, a researcher at Tampa Bay Times, Connie Humburg, a computer-assisted reporting specialist, Bill Higgins, a web developer, and David Fitzpatrick, a CNN senior producer. CNN joined the partnership in March 2012.) In 2012, Kids Wish raised $18.6 million but only spent one percent on granting children's wishes—$240,000. It reported that the organization had spent $110 million on fund-raising solicitors over the prior decade, making it number 1 on the list. According to the report, only three cents out of every dollar raised is spent on wish-granting.

The report also said that the organization was paying several million dollars on services to companies operated by Breiner, who retired as the Executive Director in 2010. Since his retirement, Kids Wish Network has paid Breiner's companies $3.3 million.

The charity first reported the payments in amended tax filings in 2012 after an employee took her concerns about insider dealings to the charity’s board.

According to the report, "Kids Wish violated IRS rules by waiting four years to disclose the money it paid Breiner. The charity blamed the delay on a mistake by its accountants." Breiner said that Kids Wish Network had recently completed an IRS audit, which reviewed his contracts with the organization and found no conflicts of interest.

According to its 2011 IRS filing, the charity has 51 employees. Melissa Schwartz, a New York City-based crisis-management specialist (Note: Schwartz "previously worked for the federal government after the 2010 BP oil spill".) hired by Kids Wish Network said that the charity contracts corporate telemarketers so that Kids Wish Network staff can focus on "working with children" not on "raising donations." She said the 100 percent of money pledged directly to Kids Wish Network—as opposed to donations collected through telephone solicitors—goes directly to charity. She "is focused on the future."

In 2020, Charity Navigator broke down the IRS Form 990 for Kids Wish Network; reporting that for every $1 raised, it cost the organization $0.78 - leaving $0.22 for charitable giving.

Again in 2022, Kids Wish Network was named as the worst charity to give to by smartasset.
