= Shape of My Heart (Backstreet Boys song) =

2000 single by Backstreet Boys

Single by Backstreet Boys

from the album Black & Blue
- Released: October 2, 2000
- Recorded: July 1 – September 2000
- Studio: Cheiron (Stockholm, Sweden); Polar (Stockholm, Sweden)
- Genre: Pop
- Length: 3:50
- Label: Jive
- Songwriters: Max Martin; Rami; Lisa Miskovsky
- Producers: Martin; Rami

Backstreet Boys singles chronology
"The One" (2000)	"Shape of My Heart" (2000)	"The Call" (2001)

Audio sample
- A sample from "Shape of My Heart" by Backstreet Boys: file; help

Music video
- "Shape of My Heart" on YouTube

"Shape of My Heart" is a song by American boy band Backstreet Boys. It was released on October 2, 2000, as the lead single from their fourth studio album, Black & Blue. The ballad was written and produced by Max Martin and Rami Yacoub and co-written by Lisa Miskovsky. Following its release, "Shape of My Heart" topped the singles charts of nine countries and reached the top 10 on 16 others, including the US Billboard Hot 100, on which it peaked at number nine. The song earned a Grammy Award nomination during the 44th Grammy Awards for Best Pop Performance by a Duo or Group with Vocals.

== Background ==
Due to the success of rival boy band NSYNC's 2000 album No Strings Attached selling over 2.4 million copies in its first week, there were high expectations from industry experts and fans that the Backstreet Boys' next album Black & Blue would break the first week sales of No Strings Attached. "Shape of My Heart" was widely anticipated as the lead single of Black & Blue, which would follow their previous singles "Quit Playing Games (With My Heart)", "Everybody (Backstreet's Back)", and "I Want It That Way".

== Composition ==
"Shape of My Heart" is stated to be "the sound of a boy band becoming a group of men." It consists of a bubblegum chorus, clean pop structure, along with various vocal harmonies from Max Martin's production. It also contains soft-pop guitar, low-key percussion, and a lyrical emphasis on the reflection of past mistakes.

The song is performed in D major with a key change to E major at the third chorus.

== Critical reception ==
Craig Seymour of Entertainment Weekly gave the song a C− in his review, stating that the "mid-tempo ballad is more a joyless retread than a maturing makeover". Jason Lipshutz of Billboard considered the song to be a disappointment, stating that it was a muted mid-tempo reflection on mistakes and weaknesses, as well as being "miscast as a flashy comeback that would return serve against *NSYNC and hijack pop radio for months."

== Chart performance ==
The song reached number nine on the US Billboard Hot 100, giving the group their sixth and last top-10 single in the United States, while reaching number eight on the Billboard Mainstream Top 40 chart. It topped the charts of Canada, Italy, the Netherlands, New Zealand, Norway, and Switzerland, as well as the Eurochart Hot 100.

== Music video ==
The video's monochrome and blue tinted style is inspired by "classic photography" to showcase the band's maturity in contrast to their earlier upbeat music videos.

=== Background ===
The music video for "Shape of My Heart" was directed by Matthew Rolston at the Orpheum Theatre in Los Angeles. The entire video is shot in monochrome with a blue tint, creating a black and blue atmosphere about the album's name. Rolston was inspired by "classic photography," utilizing the blue tint to evoke earlier periods of photography, as well as showcasing a mature side of the band in place of their previous over-the-top videos. In a 2023 video posted to the band's YouTube account, Brian Littrell said he still owns the jacket he wore in the video.

=== Synopsis ===
The video shows the Backstreet Boys rehearsing lines for a production titled Shape of My Heart, printed on a script around an empty theater in places such as the backstage wall and on the stage. The actress Sara Foster and the actor Ryan McTavish rehearse on the stage while another couple watches from a desk in front of the audience. Each person introduced is also featured alongside the Backstreet Boys as they rehearse.

== Legacy ==
The song was the last single by the Backstreet Boys to peak in the top ten of the Billboard Hot 100 chart. Jason Lipshutz stated that the song's influence spread to future Backstreet Boys singles such as "Incomplete," "Show 'Em (What You're Made Of)," and "Don't Go Breaking My Heart," concluding that although it wasn't a smash, it has become "an important inflection point for one of the era’s biggest groups".

== Cover versions ==
In 2008, one of the song's writers, Lisa Miskovsky, released her version of the song, "Another Shape of My Heart," on her 2008 album Last Year's Songs: Greatest Hits.

== Track listings ==
Standard CD single, UK cassette single

1. "Shape of My Heart" – 3:47
2. "All I Have to Give" (a cappella) – 3:48
3. "The One" (Jack D. Elliot Radio Mix) – 3:46

European CD single

1. "Shape of My Heart" – 3:47
2. "All I Have to Give" (a cappella) – 3:48

== Credits and personnel ==
Credits are taken from the European CD single-liner notes.

Recording

- Recorded and mixed at Cheiron Studios, Stockholm, Sweden. Vocals recorded at Polar Studios, Stockholm, Sweden.

Personnel

- Max Martin – songwriter, producer, recording, mixing, guitar
- Rami Yacoub – songwriter, producer, recording, mixing
- Lisa Miskovsky – songwriter
- Stefan Boman – vocal recording engineer
- Esbjörn Öhrwall – guitar
- Peter Svensson – guitar
- Tomas Lindberg – bass
- John Amatiello – Pro Tools and XBS Optical Vocal Enhancer engineer
- Tom Coyne – mastering

== Charts ==
=== Weekly charts ===
2000–2001 weekly chart performance for "Shape of My Heart"
Chart (2000–2001)	Peak position
Australia (ARIA)	5
Austria (Ö3 Austria Top 40)	4
Belgium (Ultratop 50 Flanders)	11
Belgium (Ultratop 50 Wallonia)	25
Canada (Nielsen SoundScan)	1
Canada CHR (Nielsen BDS)	1
Canada Top Singles (RPM)	5 (Note: "Shape of My Heart" reached number 5 when RPM ceased publication in November 2000.)
Canada Adult Contemporary (RPM)	1
Croatia (HRT)	1
Denmark (IFPI)	2
Dominican Republic (Notimex)	2
El Salvador (EFE)	1
Europe (Eurochart Hot 100)	1
Europe (European Hit Radio)	1
Finland (Suomen virallinen lista)	3
Finland Airplay (Radiosoittolista)	1
Germany (GfK)	2
Greece (IFPI)	10
Guatemala (Notimex)	1
Honduras (EFE)	3
Iceland (Íslenski Listinn Topp 40)	6
Ireland (IRMA)	6
Italy (FIMI)	1
Italy (Musica e dischi)	3
Japan (Oricon)	36
Latvia (Latvijas Top 30)	3
Netherlands (Dutch Top 40)	2
Netherlands (Single Top 100)	3
New Zealand (Recorded Music NZ)	1
Norway (VG-lista)	1
Poland Airplay (Music & Media)	2
Poland (Polish Airplay Charts)	1
Romania (Romanian Top 100)	3
Scottish Singles Sales (Official Charts)	3
Spain (Promusicae)	2
Spain Airplay (Top 40 Radio)	1
Sweden (Sverigetopplistan)	1
Switzerland (Schweizer Hitparade)	1
UK Singles (Official Charts)	4
UK Airplay (Music Week)	34
UK Indie (Official Charts)	1
Uruguay (EFE)	3
US Billboard Hot 100	9
US Adult Contemporary (Billboard)	2
US Adult Pop Airplay (Billboard)	24
US Pop Airplay (Billboard)	8
Venezuela (EFE)	2

2026 weekly chart performance for "Shape of My Heart"
Chart (2026)	Peak position
Indonesia (IFPI)	6
Philippines Hot 100 (Billboard Philippines)	79

=== Year-end charts ===
2000 year-end chart performance for "Shape of My Heart"
Chart (2000)	Position
Australia (ARIA)	30
Brazil (Crowley)	15
Denmark (IFPI)	18
Europe (Eurochart Hot 100)	55
Europe (European Hit Radio)	74
Germany (Media Control)	46
Ireland (IRMA)	73
Latvia (Latvijas Top 50)	40
Netherlands (Dutch Top 40)	76
Netherlands (Single Top 100)	61
Romania (Romanian Top 100)	48
Sweden (Hitlistan)	29
Switzerland (Schweizer Hitparade)	35
UK Singles (OCC)	141
US Mainstream Top 40 (Billboard)	81

2001 year-end chart performance for "Shape of My Heart"
Chart (2001)	Position
Canada (Nielsen SoundScan)	46
Canada Radio (Nielsen BDS)	46
Europe (European Hot 100 Singles)	87
Europe (European Hit Radio)	45
Taiwan (Hito Radio)	8
US Adult Contemporary (Billboard)	8
US Adult Top 40 (Billboard)	66
US Mainstream Top 40 (Billboard)	83

2002 year-end chart performance for "Shape of My Heart"
Chart (2002)	Position
Canada (Nielsen SoundScan)	173

== Certifications ==
Certifications and sales for "Shape of My Heart"
Region	Certification	Certified units/sales
Australia (ARIA)	Platinum	70,000^{^}
Brazil (Pro-Música Brasil)	Gold	30,000^{‡}
Denmark (IFPI Danmark)	Platinum	8,000^{^}
Germany (BVMI)	Gold	250,000^{^}
Japan (RIAJ) Full-length ringtone	Gold	100,000^{*}
New Zealand (RMNZ)	Platinum	30,000^{‡}
Norway (IFPI Norway)	Gold	
Sweden (GLF)	Platinum	30,000^{^}
United Kingdom (BPI)	Gold	400,000^{‡}
^{*} Sales figures based on certification alone.^{^} Shipments figures based on certification alone.^{‡} Sales+streaming figures based on certification alone.

== Release history ==
Release dates and formats for "Shape of My Heart"
Region	Date	Format	Label	Ref.
United States	October 2, 2000	Radio airplay	Jive	
United States	October 9, 2000	CD single	Jive	
Japan	November 1, 2000	CD single	Jive	
United Kingdom	November 6, 2000	Cassette single	Jive	
