= The Call (Backstreet Boys song) =

2001 single by Backstreet Boys

Single by Backstreet Boys

from the album Black & Blue
- Released: February 6, 2001
- Recorded: July 1 – September 2000
- Studio: Polar (Stockholm, Sweden)
- Genre: Pop, dance-pop, R&B, hip hop
- Length: 3:24 (Radio Version); 3:57 (Video Version); 3:53 (Neptunes Remix)
- Label: Jive, Trans Continental
- Songwriters: Max Martin, Rami
- Producers: Max Martin, Rami

Backstreet Boys singles chronology
"Shape of My Heart" (2000)	"The Call" (2001)	"More than That" (2001)

Music videos
- "The Call" on YouTube; "The Call" (remix) on YouTube

"The Call" is a song by American boy band Backstreet Boys. It was released on February 6, 2001, as the second single from their album Black & Blue (2000).

== Composition ==
According to the sheet music published at Musicnotes.com by Universal Music Publishing Group, "The Call" has a BPM of 100 and is played in the key of B-flat minor (with a key change to C minor). The band's vocal range spans from the low note F_{3} to the high note of A_{b4}.

An instrument in the song is the sound of Howie Dorough's flatulence while recording the vocals, which producer Max Martin sampled. In 2017, Dorough said of the incident: "I got in the booth, was breathing in really heavily singing my part, and I guess some extra air kind of came out. It made everybody laugh, and Max decided to take that and sample it to turn it into the 'dun dun dun, dun dun dun dun.'"

== Music video ==
=== Background ===
The music video for "The Call" was directed by Francis Lawrence. For the video version of the song was edited to extend the length of the song. Additional telephone rings were added at the start, and one measure was added to both the break following the second chorus and the subsequent a cappella choral segment. A third repeat of the final chorus was also added.

Two cuts of the video were released. One featured the modified version, and the second featured the Neptunes remix. The two versions were substantially the same; however, the differing arrangements of the two song versions resulted in the video being slightly re-edited to match. The Neptunes video also adds flashes of early in the video as callbacks near the end of the video; there is also an unreleased remix video using the Thunderpuss Club Mix and the Thunderdub of the song. Band member AJ McLean later admitted on The Oprah Winfrey Show, in an episode discussing his recovery from depression and drug and alcohol abuse, that he tried cocaine for the first time on the set of this video. The music video won at the MTV Asia Awards 2002 for Favorite Video. The song also received two nominations for Best Pop Video and Viewer's Choice at the 2001 MTV Video Music Awards.

=== Synopsis ===
Complementing the lyrics to the song, the video tells the story of a man who is unfaithful to his girlfriend. He meets another lady in a nightclub and leaves the club with her instead of going home to his girlfriend (whom he calls to make up an excuse for being late home). Each member of the Backstreet Boys serve as the cheating man progressively. At the end, they are caught by the girlfriend and her friends of friends.

== Track listing ==
- European maxi single
1. "The Call" (Radio Version) – 3:24
2. "Shape of My Heart" (Soul Solution Radio Mix) – 2:56
3. "Shape of My Heart" (Soul Solution Club Mix) – 7:03
- The Call (Remixes) European maxi single
1. "The Call" (Radio Version) – 3:24
2. "The Call" (Fragma Remix) – 6:05
3. "The Call" (Tom Novy Remix) – 6:16
4. "The Call" (Neptunes Remix with Pharrell and Clipse) - 3:56
5. "The Call" (Kruger Mix) – 5:22
6. "The Call" (Thunderpuss Radio Edit) – 3:10
7. "The Call" (Thunderpuss Club Mix) – 8:26
8. "The Call" (Thunderdub) – 8:03
- The Call (Neptunes Remixes) 12" promo single
1. "The Call" (Neptunes Remix with Rap) – 3:53
2. "The Call" (Remix without Rap) – 3:55
3. "The Call" (Earthone III Remix) – 3:43

== Credits and personnel ==
Credits adapted from the European maxi single's liner notes.

- Max Martin – songwriter, producer, recording, mixer
- Rami Yacoub – songwriter, producer, recording, mixer
- John Amatiello – assistant recording engineer, Pro Tools engineer
- Henrik Janson – guitar
- Stockholm Session Strings – strings
- Tom Coyne – mastering

== Charts ==
=== Weekly charts ===
Chart (2001)	Peak position
Australia (ARIA)	19
Austria (Ö3 Austria Top 40)	23
Belgium (Ultratop 50 Flanders)	30
Belgium (Ultratip Bubbling Under Wallonia)	6
Canada CHR (Nielsen BDS)	4
Croatia (HRT)	8
Europe (Eurochart Hot 100)	12
Europe (European Hit Radio)	15
Finland (Suomen virallinen lista)	15
Germany (GfK)	17
Ireland (IRMA)	17
Italy (FIMI)	6
Italy (Musica e dischi)	11
Latvia (Latvijas Top 30)	20
Netherlands (Dutch Top 40)	9
Netherlands (Single Top 100)	9
New Zealand (Recorded Music NZ)	19
Norway (VG-lista)	8
Poland Airplay (Music & Media)	4
Poland (Polish Airplay Charts)	7
Portugal (AFP)	10
Romania (Romanian Top 100)	1
Scottish Singles Sales (Official Charts)	8
Spain (Promusicae)	2
Spain Airplay (Top 40 Radio)	12
Sweden (Sverigetopplistan)	5
Switzerland (Schweizer Hitparade)	30
UK Singles (Official Charts)	8
UK Indie (Official Charts)	1
US Billboard Hot 100	52
US Pop Airplay (Billboard)	19

=== Year-end charts ===
Chart (2001)	Position
Europe (European Hit Radio)	84
Sweden (Hitlistan)	50
UK Singles (OCC)	182

== Certifications ==
Region	Certification	Certified units/sales
Denmark (IFPI Danmark)	Platinum	8,000^{^}
^{^} Shipments figures based on certification alone.

== See also ==
- List of Romanian Top 100 number ones of the 2000s
