= Plumb discography =

- Studio albums: 9
- Extended plays: 2
- Compilation albums: 4
- Singles: 32
- Music videos: 12

The following article describes in detail the discography of Plumb, which includes all of her studio albums, compilation albums, singles, and rare releases.

== Studio albums ==
Title	Details	Peak chart positions	
Title	Details	US	US Christ
Plumb	Release date: July 29, 1997; Label: Essential Records; Formats: CD, cassette	—	28
candycoatedwaterdrops	Release date: April 13, 1999; Label: Essential Records; Formats: CD, cassette	— (Note: candycoatedwaterdrops did not enter the Billboard 200, but did peak at No. 25 on the Heatseekers Albums.)	15
Beautiful Lumps of Coal	Release date: March 25, 2003; Label: Curb Records; Formats: CD	— (Note: Beautiful Lumps of Coal did not enter the Billboard 200, but did peak at No. 33 on the Heatseekers Albums.)	32
Chaotic Resolve	Release date: February 28, 2006; Label: Curb Records; Formats: CD, music download	177	10
Blink	Release date: October 9, 2007; Label: Curb Records; Formats: CD, music download	—	23
Need You Now	Release date: February 26, 2013; Label: Curb Records; Formats: CD, music download	56	2
Exhale	Release date: May 4, 2015; Label: Curb Records; Formats: CD, music download	81	3
Beautifully Broken	Release date: June 22, 2018; Label: Plumb Music Inc.; Formats: CD, music download	— (Note: Beautifully Broken did not enter the Billboard 200, but did peak at No. 86 on the Top Current Albums chart.)	20
candycoatedwaterdrops reimagined	Release date: April 13, 2024; Label: Plumb Music Inc.; Formats: CD, LP, cassette, music download	TBD	TBD
"—" denotes releases that did not chart

== Extended plays ==
Title	Details
Behold	Release date: November 22, 2019; Label: Plumb Music / Street Talk Media; Formats: Music download
It's Christmastime	Release date: November 29, 2019; Label: Plumb Music / Street Talk Media; Formats: Music download

== Singles ==
Single	Year	Peak chart positions							Certifications	Album
Single	Year	US Bub.	US Christ.	US Christ. Airplay	US AC	US Adult Pop	US Dance	UK	Certifications	Album
"Sobering (Don't Turn Around)"	1997	—	—		—	—	—	—		Plumb
"Unforgivable"	1997	—	—		—	—	—	—		Plumb
"Crazy"	1997	—	—		—	—	—	—		Plumb
"Endure"	1997	—	—		—	—	—	—		Plumb
"Who Am I?"	1997	—	—		—	—	—	—		Plumb
"Late Great Planet Earth"	1999	—	—		—	—	—	—		candycoatedwaterdrops
"God-Shaped Hole"	1999	—	—		—	—	—	—		candycoatedwaterdrops
"Stranded"	1999	—	—		—	—	—	—		candycoatedwaterdrops
"Here with Me"	1999	—	—		—	—	—	—		candycoatedwaterdrops
"Damaged"	1999	—	—		—	—	—	—		candycoatedwaterdrops
"Phobic"	1999	—	—		—	—	—	—		candycoatedwaterdrops
"Solace"	1999	—	—		—	—	—	—		candycoatedwaterdrops
"Free"	2003	—	—		—	—	—	—		Beautiful Lumps of Coal
"Sink N' Swim"	2003	—	39		—	—	—	—		Beautiful Lumps of Coal
"Real"	2004	—	—		—	30	—	41		Beautiful Lumps of Coal
"Boys Don't Cry"	2004	—	—		—	—	—	—		Beautiful Lumps of Coal
"Better"	2005	—	—		—	—	—	—		Chaotic Resolve
"I Can't Do This"	2005	—	—		—	—	—	—		Chaotic Resolve
"Cut"	2006	—	26		—	—	—	—		Chaotic Resolve
"Blush (Only You)"	2006	—	—		—	—	—	—		Chaotic Resolve
"Bittersweet"	2006	—	—		—	—	—	—		Chaotic Resolve
"Real Life Fairytale"	2006	—	—		—	—	—	—		Chaotic Resolve
"In My Arms"	2007	—	24		10	—	3	—	RIAA: Gold	Blink
"Blink"	2009	—	—		—	—	—	—		Blink
"Hang On"	2009	—	—		—	—	1	—		Beautiful History: A Hits Collection
"God-Shaped Hole (2010)" (re-release)	2010	—	25		—	—	—	—		Beautiful History: A Hits Collection
"Beautiful History"	2010	—	22		—	—	—	—		Beautiful History: A Hits Collection
"Drifting" (featuring Dan Haseltine)	2011	—	27		—	—	5	—		Need You Now
"Need You Now (How Many Times)"	2012	21	3		—	—	4	—	RIAA: Gold	Need You Now
"One Drop"	2013	—	23		—	—	—	—		Need You Now
"Don't Deserve You"	2014	—	15	20	—	—	—	—		Need You Now
"Lord I'm Ready Now"	2014	—	10	6	—	—	—	—		Exhale
"Exhale"	2015	—	12	10	—	—	—	—		Exhale
"Smoke"	2015	—	—	46	—	—	—	—		Exhale
"God Help Me"	2017	—	18	15	—	—	—	—		Beautifully Broken
"Beautifully Broken"	2018	—	23	20	—	—	7	—		Beautifully Broken
"Crazy About You"	2018	—	—	34	—	—	—	—		Beautifully Broken
"Somebody Loves You"	2019	—	—	—	—	—	—	—		Beautifully Broken
"Behold"	2019	—	—	49	—	—	—	—		Behold (EP)
"Christmas Vacation"	2019	—	—	45	—	—	—	—		It's Christmastime (EP)
"Somebody Loves You" (Aly & Fila with Plumb)	2020	—	—	—	—	—	—	—		non-album single
"Same Sky Same Stars" (featuring Ben Gold)	2022	—	—	—	—	—	—	—		non-album single
"—" denotes releases that did not chart

== Compilation albums ==
Behold (compilation of the Behold and It’s Christmastime extended plays)

- Released: December 1, 2020
- Label: Plumb Music

Beautiful History — A Hits Collection

- Released: November 13, 2009
- Label: Curb
- Singles: "God-shaped Hole (2010)", "Hang On", "Beautiful History"

Simply Plumb

- Released: June 28, 2005
- Label: Provident

The Best of Plumb

- Released: August 22, 2000
- Label: Essential

== Music videos ==
- "Unforgivable"
- "Sobering (Don't Turn Around)"
- "Crazy"
- "Real"
- "Boys Don't Cry"
- "Sink N' Swim"
- "Cut"
- "I Don't Deserve You" (by Paul Van Dyk)
- "Drifting"
- "One Drop"
- "Beautiful"
- "Need You Now (How Many Times)"
- "Beautifully Broken"
- "Somebody Loves You" (by Aly & Fila)

== Compilation contributions ==
- Dog Park Soundtrack, 1998 ... "Stranded"
- Surfonic Water Revival, 1998 ... "Surfer Girl Replies"
- Viva!, 1999 ... "Stranded" Demo
- Propska One, 1999 ... "Endure" Remix
- Brokedown Palace Soundtrack, 1999 ... "Damaged"
- Drive Me Crazy Soundtrack, 1999 ... "Stranded"
- WOW 2000, 1999 ... "Stranded"
- Unshakeable: Acquire the Fire, 2001 ... "History Maker"
- Essential Hits: Ten - Celebrating A Decade of Wonder, 2002 ... "God-Shaped Hole"
- View from the Top Soundtrack, 2003 .. "Boys Don't Cry"
- Bruce Almighty Soundtrack, 2003 ... "God-Shaped Hole"
- Absolute Modern Worship, 2005 ... "All My Tears (Be Washed Away)"
- The Perfect Man Soundtrack, 2005 ... "Real Life Fairytale"
- Ultimate Music Makeover: The Songs of Michael W. Smith, 2005 ... "Pray For Me"
- WOW Hits 2007, 2006 ... "I Can't Do This"
- The Nativity Story: Sacred Songs, 2006 ... "Mary Sweet Mary" (with Selah)
- Evan Almighty Soundtrack, 2007 ... "Spirit in the Sky"
- WOW Hits 2014, 2013 ... "Need You Now (How Many Times)"
- WOW Hits 2015, 2014 ... "Don't Deserve You"
- WOW Hits 2016, 2015 ... "Lord, I'm Ready Now"
- WOW Hits 2017, 2016 ... "Exhale"
