= WOW Hits 2014 =

- Original cover of deluxe edition.

Compilation album by Various artists
- Released: September 24, 2013
- Genre: Contemporary Christian music
- Label: EMI CMG

WOW Hits compilation albums chronology
| WOW Hits 2013 (2012) | WOW Hits 2014 (2013) | WOW Hits 2015 (2014) |

WOW Hits 2014 is a two-disc compilation album composed of some of the biggest hits on Christian radio in 2013. This disc features 33 songs (39 on the deluxe edition).

On March 21, 2014, the album was certified gold by the RIAA with shipments of over 500,000 copies in the US.

== Track listing ==
Disc one
| No. | Title | Writer(s) | Artist (Album) | Length |
|---|---|---|---|---|
| 1. | "Whom Shall I Fear (God of Angel Armies)" | Ed Cash, Scott Cash, Chris Tomlin | Chris Tomlin (Burning Lights) | 4:01 |
| 2. | "Redeemed" | Benji Cowart, Mike Weaver | Big Daddy Weave (Love Come to Life) | 4:36 |
| 3. | "Hello, My Name Is" | Matthew West | Matthew West (Into the Light) | 3:43 |
| 4. | "You Are I Am" | Jason Ingram, MercyMe, Seth Mosley, Dan Muckala | MercyMe (The Hurt & The Healer) | 4:20 |
| 5. | "One Thing Remains" (radio version) | Christa Black Gifford, Brian Johnson, Jeremy Riddle | Kristian Stanfill (Passion: White Flag) | 3:59 |
| 6. | "Lord, I Need You" | Daniel Carson, Matt Maher, Christy Nockels, Jesse Reeves, Kristian Stanfill | Matt Maher (All the People Said Amen) | 3:25 |
| 7. | "Jesus, Friend of Sinners" | Mark Hall, Matthew West | Casting Crowns (Come to the Well) | 4:47 |
| 8. | "Strangely Dim" | Francesca Battistelli, Mia Fieldes, Seth Mosley | Francesca Battistelli (Hundred More Years (Deluxe Edition)) | 3:21 |
| 9. | "Love Take Me Over" | Steven Curtis Chapman | Steven Curtis Chapman (The Glorious Unfolding) | 3:01 |
| 10. | "Your Grace Finds Me" | Jonas Myrin, Matt Redman | Matt Redman (Your Grace Finds Me) | 4:33 |
| 11. | "My God" | Jeremy Camp, Andy Dodd | Jeremy Camp (Reckless) | 3:58 |
| 12. | "Help Me Find It" | David Frey, Jason Ingram, Ben McDonald | Sidewalk Prophets (Live Like That) | 3:45 |
| 13. | "Steady My Heart" | Matt Bronleewe, Ben Glover, Kari Jobe | Kari Jobe (Where I Find You) | 3:27 |
| 14. | "Jesus in Disguise" | Ross Copperman, Brandon Heath, Lee Thomas Miller | Brandon Heath (Blue Mountain) | 3:38 |
| 15. | "Don't Try So Hard" (featuring James Taylor) | Ben Glover, Amy Grant | Amy Grant (How Mercy Looks from Here) | 3:44 |
| 16. | "Starts With Me" (bonus track) | Alli Rogers, Tim Timmons | Tim Timmons (Cast My Cares) | 3:20 |
| 17. | "Come However You Are" (bonus track) | Robert Earle, Molly Reed, David Garcia, Ben Glover | City Harbor (City Harbor) | 3:39 |

Disc one deluxe edition (additional tracks)
| No. | Title | Writer(s) | Artist (Album) | Length |
|---|---|---|---|---|
| 18. | "Good to Be Alive" | Jason Gray, Brandon Heath, Jason Ingram | Jason Gray (A Way to See in the Dark) | 3:24 |
| 19. | "Pray" | Matt Hammitt, Chris Rohman, Christopher Stevens | Sanctus Real (Run) | 3:56 |
| 20. | "Restore" | Chris August, Ian Eskelin | Chris August (The Upside of Down) | 3:59 |

Disc two
| No. | Title | Writer(s) | Artist (Album) | Length |
|---|---|---|---|---|
| 1. | "We Won't Be Shaken" | Casey Brown, Tim Rosenau, Jason Roy, Jonathan Smith | Building 429 (We Won't Be Shaken) | 3:56 |
| 2. | "Steal My Show" | Toby McKeehan, Christopher Stevens, Brandon Heath | tobyMac (Eye on It) | 3:24 |
| 3. | "Gold" | Jess Cates, Dan Muckala, Britt Nicole | Britt Nicole (Gold) | 2:58 |
| 4. | "I Need a Miracle" | Mac Powell | Third Day (Miracle) | 3:44 |
| 5. | "The Proof of Your Love (The Monologue Mix)" | Ben Glover, Jonathan Lee, Joel Smallbone, Luke Smallbone, Fred Williams | for KING & COUNTRY (Crave) | 3:41 |
| 6. | "Need You Now (How Many Times)" | Tiffany Arbuckle-Lee, Luke Sheets, Christa Wells | Plumb (Need You Now) | 4:12 |
| 7. | "You Are" | Colton Dixon, busbee, Jared Martin, Rhyan Shirley | Colton Dixon (A Messenger) | 3:22 |
| 8. | "Overcomer" | Christopher Stevens, David Garcia | Mandisa (Overcomer) | 3:43 |
| 9. | "Worn" | Mike Donehey, Jeff Owen, Jason Ingram | Tenth Avenue North (The Struggle) | 4:04 |
| 10. | "His Kind of Love" | Blanca Callahan, David Garcia, Ben Glover, Manwell Reyes | Group 1 Crew (Fearless) | 3:27 |
| 11. | "Kings & Queens" | Chuck Butler, Juan Otero, Joel Parisien | Audio Adrenaline (Kings & Queens) | 3:49 |
| 12. | "Live With Abandon" | Joshua Silverberg, Kipp Williams, Jon White | Newsboys (Restart) | 3:20 |
| 13. | "Keep Your Eyes Open" | Bo Rinehart | NEEDTOBREATHE (The Reckoning) | 4:10 |
| 14. | "When Mercy Found Me" | Jeff Pardo, Rhett Walker | Rhett Walker Band (Come to the River) | 3:58 |
| 15. | "Even If" | Scott Krippayne, Tony Wood | Kutless (Believer) | 3:40 |
| 16. | "Never Beyond Repair" (bonus track) | Seth Mosley, Nikita Odnoralov, Ruslan Odnoralov, Yan Odnoralov | Everfound (Everfound) | 3:30 |

Disc two deluxe edition (additional tracks)
| No. | Title | Writer(s) | Artist (Album) | Length |
|---|---|---|---|---|
| 17. | "Every Good Thing" | Matt Fuqua, David Garcia, Ben Glover, Josh Havens | The Afters (Life Is Beautiful) | 3:47 |
| 18. | "Hurricane" | Matt Bronleewe, Natalie Grant, Cindy Morgan | Natalie Grant (Hurricane) | 3:29 |
| 19. | "Carry Me" | Ben Glover, Josh Wilson | Josh Wilson (Carry Me) | 3:23 |

== Chart performance ==
| Chart (2015) | Peak position |
|---|---|
| US Billboard 200 | 29 |
| US Christian Albums (Billboard) | 1 |

== Certifications ==
| Region | Certification | Certified units/sales |
|---|---|---|
| United States (RIAA) | Gold | 500,000^{^} |
^{^} Shipments figures based on certification alone.
