= WOW Hits 2015 =

- Original cover of deluxe edition.

Compilation album by Various artists
- Released: September 30, 2014
- Genre: Contemporary Christian music, worship
- Label: Capitol CMG, SME

WOW Hits compilation albums chronology
WOW Hits 2014 (2013)	WOW Hits 2015 (2014)	WOW Hits 2016 (2015)

WOW Hits 2015 is a two–disc compilation album featuring of the biggest songs on Christian radio in 2013 and 2014. The album features 33 songs in the standard, and 39 in the deluxe. It was released on September 30, 2014. As of January 2015 it has sold 155,000 copies.

== Track listing ==
Disc one
No.	Title	Artist (Album)	Length
1.	"We Believe" (radio version)	Newsboys (Restart)	3:41
2.	"The Only Name (Yours Will Be)" (radio version)	Big Daddy Weave (Love Come to Life)	3:58
3.	"Oceans (Where Feet May Fail)" (album edit)	United (Zion)	4:15
4.	"Thrive"	Casting Crowns (Thrive)	5:05
5.	"Do Something" (radio version)	Matthew West (Into the Light)	4:03
6.	"Back to You"	Mandisa (Overcomer)	3:34
7.	"Keep Making Me"	Sidewalk Prophets (Live Like That)	3:21
8.	"I Am"	Crowder (Neon Steeple)	3:33
9.	"Waterfall"	Chris Tomlin (Love Ran Red)	3:29
10.	"All the People Said Amen"	Matt Maher (All the People Said Amen)	3:01
11.	"Shake"	MercyMe (Welcome to the New)	3:12
12.	"You Won't Let Go"	Michael W. Smith (Sovereign)	3:59
13.	"My Heart Is Yours" (featuring Kristian Stanfill) (radio version)	Passion (Take It All)	4:08
14.	"Glorious Unfolding" (radio edit)	Steven Curtis Chapman (The Glorious Unfolding)	3:58
15.	"Forever" (radio version)	Kari Jobe (Majestic)	4:00
16.	"I Will Follow" (bonus track)	Jon Guerra (Little Songs)	4:08
17.	"Beautiful" (bonus track)	Dan Bremnes (Where the Light Is)	3:42

Disc one deluxe edition
No.	Title	Artist (Album)	Length
18.	"Lay It Down"	Sanctus Real (The Dream)	3:49
19.	"Mercy" (radio version)	Matt Redman (Your Grace Finds Me)	3:50
20.	"Lift My Life Up"	Unspoken (Unspoken)	4:01

Disc two
No.	Title	Artist (Album)	Length
1.	"This Is Amazing Grace"	Phil Wickham (The Ascension)	4:38
2.	"Fix My Eyes"	for KING & COUNTRY (Run Wild. Live Free. Love Strong.)	3:34
3.	"Speak Life"	tobyMac (Eye on It)	3:25
4.	"Beautiful Day"	Jamie Grace (Ready to Fly)	3:11
5.	"Multiplied"	NEEDTOBREATHE (Rivers in the Wasteland)	4:34
6.	"More of You"	Colton Dixon (Anchor)	4:05
7.	"Write Your Story"	Francesca Battistelli (If We're Honest)	3:22
8.	"No Man Is an Island"	Tenth Avenue North (Cathedrals)	4:15
9.	"Press On" (featuring Blanca)	Building 429 (We Won't Be Shaken)	2:48
10.	"Come Alive"	Jeremy Camp (Reckless)	3:21
11.	"Alive" (radio version)	Young & Free (We Are Young & Free)	3:36
12.	"Love Alone Is Worth the Fight"	Switchfoot (Fading West)	4:33
13.	"Don't Deserve You"	Plumb (Need You Now)	3:40
14.	"Your Love Is Like a River"	Third Day (Miracle)	4:15
15.	"He Is With Us"	Love & the Outcome (Love & the Outcome)	3:45
16.	"Satisfied" (bonus track)	About a Mile (About a Mile)	3:51

Disc two deluxe edition
No.	Title	Artist (Album)	Length
17.	"Words" (featuring Bart Millard)	Hawk Nelson (Made)	3:21
18.	"American Noise"	Skillet (Rise)	4:09
19.	"Ready Set Go" (featuring Capital Kings)	Royal Tailor (Royal Tailor)	3:29

== Chart performance ==
Chart (2015)	Peak position
US Billboard 200	23
US Christian Albums (Billboard)	1

== Certifications ==
Region	Certification	Certified units/sales
United States (RIAA)	Gold	500,000^{^}
^{^} Shipments figures based on certification alone.

== Release history ==
Region	Date	Format	Label	Ref.
Worldwide	September 30, 2014	CD, digital download	Capitol CMG, SME	
