= Beautiful History =

Greatest hits album by Plumb
- Released: November 13, 2009
- Recorded: 2003–2009
- Genre: Christian rock
- Length: 48:32
- Label: Curb
- Producer: Matt Bronleewe; Tiffany Arbuckle Lee; Jeremy Bose; Jimmy Collins

Plumb chronology
Blink (2007)	Beautiful History (2009)	Need You Now (2013)

Singles from Beautiful History
- 1. "God Shaped Hole (2010)" Released: September 8, 2009; 2. "Hang On" Released: October 6, 2009; 3. "Beautiful History" Released: February 2010

Professional ratings
Review scores
Source	Rating
Allmusic	3.5/5 stars
Jesus Freak Hideout	4.5/5 stars

Beautiful History: A Hits Collection is the third compilation album by Christian singer Plumb. It contains re-recordings of three songs from her 1998 album candycoatedwaterdrops as well as singles from her later albums Beautiful Lumps of Coal, Chaotic Resolve and Blink. It also contains two new songs recorded for the album, "Hang On" and "Beautiful History." It peaked at No. 39 on Billboard's Christian Albums chart.

== Track listing ==
Standard edition
No.	Title	Writer(s)	Producer(s)	Length
1.	"Stranded^{[a]}" (2010)	Matt Bronleewe; Tiffany Arbuckle Lee	Bronleewe	3:51
2.	"Here with Me^{[a]}" (2010)	Arbuckle Lee; Thad Beatty; Bronleewe; Matt Stanfield	Bronleewe	4:11
3.	"Damaged^{[b]}" (Redemption extended version)	Arbuckle Lee; Beatty; Bronleewe	Bronleewe; Arbuckle Lee	5:50
4.	"God-Shaped Hole^{[a]}" (2010)	Arbuckle Lee; Wayne Kirkpatrick	Bronleewe	3:43
5.	"Real^{[c]}"	Arbuckle Lee; Christa Wells	Jimmy Collins; Arbuckle Lee	3:42
6.	"I Can't Do This^{[d]}"	Arbuckle Lee; Bronleewe	Bronleewe	4:03
7.	"Cut^{[d]}"	Arbuckle Lee; Brandon Arbuckle; Jeremy Bose; Bronleewe	Bronleewe	4:01
8.	"Better^{[d]}"	Arbuckle Lee; Bronleewe; Shaun Shankel	Bronleewe	4:10
9.	"Blush (Only You)^{[d]}"	Arbuckle Lee; Bronleewe	Bronleewe	3:48
10.	"In My Arms^{[e]}" (radio edit)	Arbuckle Lee; Bronleewe; Bose	Bose	3:54
11.	"Hang On^{[f]}"	Arbuckle Lee; Jaclyn Schutrop; Luke Sheets	Bronleewe	3:09
12.	"Beautiful History^{[f]}"	Arbuckle Lee; Bronleewe; Seth Jones	Bronleewe	4:17
Total length:				48:32

- ^{a}New recording; original version from the album candycoatedwaterdrops.
- ^{b}Originally recorded on the album candycoatedwaterdrops; this recording from the album Chaotic Resolve.
- ^{c}From the album Beautiful Lumps of Coal.
- ^{d}From the album Chaotic Resolve.
- ^{e}From the album Blink.
- ^{f}New recording.

Deluxe edition CD2 / digital bonus tracks
No.	Title	Writer(s)	Length
1.	"In My Arms" (Bimbo Jones radio edit)	Arbuckle Lee; Bronleewe; Bose	3:42
2.	"Cut" (Bronleewe & Bose radio edit)	Arbuckle Lee; Arbuckle; Jeremy Bose; Bronleewe	4:07
3.	"Hang On" (Digital Dog radio edit)	Arbuckle Lee; Schutrop; Sheets	3:09
4.	"Always" (jRyann radio edit)	Arbuckle Lee; Shankel	3:56
5.	"In My Arms" (Bronleewe & Bose extended mix)	Arbuckle Lee; Bronleewe; Bose	7:37
6.	"Cut" (Digital Dog extended mix)	Arbuckle Lee; Arbuckle; Jeremy Bose; Bronleewe	6:27
7.	"Hang On" (Dave Audé extended mix)	Arbuckle Lee; Schutrop; Sheets	7:47
8.	"Always" (Bimbo Jones extended mix)	Arbuckle Lee; Shankel	7:15
Total length:			43:56

iTunes Store exclusive bonus tracks
No.	Title	Writer(s)	Length
21.	"Hang On" (Pete Hammond extended mix)	Arbuckle Lee; Schutrop; Sheets	7:30
22.	"Always" (Bronleewe & Bose club mix)	Arbuckle Lee; Shankel	8:22
23.	"Cut" (Digital Dog radio edit)	Arbuckle Lee; Arbuckle; Jeremy Bose; Bronleewe	3:45

== Singles ==
- "God-Shaped Hole (2010)" — No. 25 Hot Christian Songs
- "Hang On" — No. 1 Hot Dance Club Play
- "Beautiful History" — No. 22 Hot Christian Songs
