= Need You Now =

Need You Now may refer to:

- Need You Now (Lady Antebellum album), 2010
  - "Need You Now" (Lady Antebellum song), the title song
- Need You Now (Plumb album), 2013
  - "Need You Now (How Many Times)", the title song
- "Need You Now" (Hot Chip song), 2014
- "Need You Now" (Dean Lewis song), 2017
- "Need You Now", a 2011 song by Cut Copy from Zonoscope
- "Need You Now", a 2005 song by Soul Central

== See also ==
- I Need You Now (disambiguation)
