= Everfound =

Everfound may refer to:

- Everfound (novel), a 2011 novel by Neal Shusterman
- Everfound (band), a Christian pop-rock band
  - Everfound (album), the band's eponymous album
