= Drifting (Plumb song) =

2011 contemporary Christian song

Single by Plumb featuring Dan Haseltine

from the album Need You Now
- Released: August 30, 2011
- Recorded: 2010–2011
- Genre: Contemporary Christian, Christian alternative, soft rock
- Length: 3:14
- Label: Curb
- Songwriters: Dan Haseltine, Tiffany Arbuckle-Lee, Matt Bronleewe

Plumb featuring Dan Haseltine singles chronology
"Beautiful History" (2010)	"Drifting" (2011)	"Need You Now" (2012)

Music video
- "Drifting" on YouTube

"Drifting" is a song by contemporary Christian musician Plumb featuring Jars of Clay frontman Dan Haseltine from her sixth studio album, Need You Now. It was released on August 30, 2011, as the first single from the album. The song peaked at No. 27 on the Hot Christian Songs chart. It lasted 13 weeks on the overall chart. The song is played in a G major key, and 80 beats per minute.

== Background ==
"Drifting" was released as the lead single on August 30, 2011 and charted on five different minor charts. The song was co-written by Matt Bronleewe of Jars of Clay who also produced Plumb's debut, self-titled album. Dan Haseltine, also of Jars of Clay, was featured on the song. Plumb uploaded a lyric video to her YouTube channel the same day of the official release of the single.

== Music video ==
A music video for the single "Drifting" was released on October 17, 2011.

== Track listing ==
- Digital download
1. "Drifting" – 3:14
- Drifting (Remixes)
1. "Drifting (Fear of Tigers Radio Edit)" – 3:41
2. "Drifting (Mixin Marc & Tony Svejda Radio Edit)" – 4:10
3. "Drifting (Loverush UK! Radio Edit)" – 3:35
4. "Drifting (Fear of Tigers Remix)" – 7:33
5. "Drifting (Mixin Marc & Tony Svejda Mixshow Edit)" – 4:28
6. "Drifting (Loverush UK! Club Mix)" – 6:13
7. "Drifting (Mixin Marc & Tony Svejda Club Mix)" – 6:57

== Charts ==
Chart (2012)	Peak position
US Hot Christian Songs (Billboard)	27
US Christian Airplay (Billboard)	27
US Christian AC Indicator (Billboard)	29
US Christian CHR (Billboard)	11
US Global Dance Tracks (Billboard)	38
US Hot Dance Club Songs (Billboard)	5
