= Tim Timmons =

Tim Timmons may refer to:

- Tim Timmons (musician) (born 1976), American contemporary Christian singer-songwriter
- Tim Timmons (umpire) (born 1967), American MLB umpire
