= The Best of Plumb =

Greatest hits album by Plumb
- Released: August 29, 2000
- Recorded: 1997–1999
- Genre: Electronic; Rock; Pop
- Length: 1:04:09
- Label: Essential
- Producer: Matt Bronleewe; Dan Haseltine; Glenn Rosenstein

Plumb chronology
candycoatedwaterdrops (1999)	The Best of Plumb (2000)	Beautiful Lumps of Coal (2003)

Professional ratings
Review scores
Source	Rating
AllMusic	4/5 stars
Artistdirect	4/5 stars
Jesus Freak Hideout	3/5 stars

The Best of Plumb is a compilation album by Christian singer Plumb which features 15 previously released songs, including three remixes.

== Track listing ==
1. "Here With Me" - 4:07
2. "Sobering (Don't Turn Around)" - 3:45
3. "Stranded" - 3:39
4. "Endure" - 3:51
5. "Late Great Planet Earth" - 3:56
6. "Who Am I?" - 4:13
7. "Phobic" - 4:31
8. "Crazy" - 2:48
9. "Damaged" - 3:56
10. "Concrete" - 3:36
11. "God-Shaped Hole" - 3:51
12. "Pennyless" - 3:03
13. "Endure" (Remix) - 6:44
14. "Who Am I?" (Remix) - 3:40
15. "Crazy" (Remix) - 8:27

== Personnel ==
- Matt Bronleewe – producer (1, 2, 4–12)
- Dan Haseltine – producer (2, 4, 6, 8, 10, 12)
- Glenn Rosenstein – producer (3)
- Ken Love – mastering at MasterMix (Nashville, Tennessee)
- Norman Jean Roy – cover photography
- Matthew Barnes – photography
- Tamara Reynolds – photography
