= Awake Our Souls =

Studio album by Tim Timmons
- Released: October 2, 2015
- Studios: The Trophy Room and Yackland Studios (Nashville, Tennessee); Provident Studios (Franklin, Tennessee)
- Genres: Worship, Contemporary Christian music, pop rock
- Length: 37:27
- Label: Reunion
- Producers: Jonathan Smith; Casey Brown; Chuck Butler; Jason Ingram; Paul Mabury

Tim Timmons chronology
Cast My Cares (2013)	Awake Our Souls (2015)

Awake Our Souls is the second studio album by Tim Timmons. Reunion Records released the album on October 2, 2015.

== Critical reception ==
Professional ratings
Review scores
Source	Rating
365 Days of Inspiring Media	4/5 stars
CCM Magazine	4/5 stars
Jesus Freak Hideout	3.5/5 stars
Worship Leader	4/5 stars

Jamie Walker, giving the album four stars from CCM Magazine, describes, "Awake Our Souls, is an impressive sophomore offering...The entire collection from the whimsical to the contemplative, will leave fans encouraged wherever the road is leading." Awarding the album four stars at Worship Leader, Bobby Gilles states, "The mostly upbeat songs feature tight, clean production and a radio-friendly style that fits within the Christian adult contemporary boundaries...Timmons consistently reminds us that Christ is our loving, gracious king."

Indicating in a three and a half star review by Jesus Freak Hideout, Michael Weaver responds, "Awake Our Souls may not be your favorite album this year, but fans of today's CCM will definitely find enjoyment and some replay value." Jonathan Andre, rating the album four stars for 365 Days of Inspiring Media, writes, "Awake Our Souls, is just as much of a breath of fresh air (or rather more specifically, fresh sounds of acoustic guitars, enthusiastic vocals, and sound biblical truths) as his debut Provident album was."

== Track listing ==
Track list
No.	Title	Writer(s)	Length
1.	"Awake Our Souls"	Tim Timmons, Alli Rogers, Jonathan Smith	2:54
2.	"Everywhere I Go"	Timmons, Jason Ingram, Paul Mabury	3:27
3.	"Like I've Been Changed"	Timmons, Matt Armstrong, Jeff Pardo	3:20
4.	"The Outcome"	Timmons, Chuck Butler, Jeff Sojka, Josh Zegan	3:20
5.	"Rest My Soul"	Timmons, Ingram	4:09
6.	"Right Beside Me"	Timmons, Ingram, Rogers	4:22
7.	"Your Are Good (That I May)"	Timmons, Ingram	4:16
8.	"Spring Up"	Timmons, Butler, Jason Walker	3:25
9.	"Finally Breathing"	Timmons, Ingram, Mabury, Rogers	3:45
10.	"All I Really Want"	Timmons, Smith, Mia Fieldes	4:29
Total length:			37:27

== Personnel ==
- Tim Timmons – vocals, acoustic guitars (3)
- Matt Stanfield – keyboards (1, 5–7, 9, 10), programming (1, 5), additional keyboards (2)
- Jonathan Smith – keyboards (1, 5), programming (1, 5), acoustic guitars (1, 5), electric guitars (1, 5)
- Casey Brown – keyboards (2), synthesizers (2), acoustic guitars (2), ukulele (2), drum programming (2)
- Chuck Butler – programming (3, 4, 8), all other instruments (3, 4, 8)
- Jeff Pardo – additional keyboards (3), additional programming (3)
- Jason Ingram – programming (6, 7, 9, 10)
- Joe Williams – programming (6, 7, 9, 10)
- Hank Bentley – electric guitars (1, 5), additional guitars (2), guitars (6, 7, 9, 10)
- Mike Payne – electric guitars (1, 5)
- Gabe Scott – acoustic guitars (1, 5), lap steel guitar (1, 5), bouzouki (1, 5), hammered dulcimer (1, 5)
- Stephen Lewerke – additional guitars (2), guitars (6, 7, 9, 10)
- Tony Lucido – bass (1, 6, 7, 9, 10)
- Chad Caroruthers – bass (5)
- Paul Mabury – drums (1, 3–7, 9, 10), programming (6, 7, 9, 10)
- Will Sayles – drums (8)
- Cara Fox – cello (1, 5)

Backing vocals

- Jonathan Smith (1, 5)
- Jason Ingram (2, 6, 7, 9, 10)
- Paul Mabury (2, 6, 7, 9, 10)
- Tim Timmons (2, 6, 7, 9, 10)
- Matthew Hein (5)
- Stephanie Kulla (5)
- Adam Palmer (5)

Gang vocals (Tracks 2, 3, 7 & 8)

- Laura Adkins
- Jaclyn Beard
- Chuck Butler
- Andrew DeZarn
- John Eisen
- Tricia Eisen
- Isaiah Henry
- Allison Hibbard
- Ethan Hulse
- Kim Johnson
- Michael Kenyon
- Ryan Kirkland
- Lauren Kotras
- Nathaneal Kotras
- Auburn McCormick
- Chris McFadden
- Jake Neumar
- Keeley Reed
- Meeshee Scherrei
- Diane Sheets
- Daniel Smith
- Cathi Workman

== Production ==
- Terry Hemmings – executive producer
- Jordyn Thomas – A&R
- Jonathan Smith – producer (1, 5)
- Casey Brown – producer (2), recording (2)
- Chuck Butler – producer (3, 4, 8)
- Jason Ingram – producer (6, 7, 9, 10)
- Paul Mabury – producer (6, 7, 9, 10)
- Buckley Miller – engineer (1, 5), drum engineer (8)
- Stephen Lewerke – drum engineer (3, 4), engineer (6, 7, 9, 10)
- John DeNosky – editing (1, 5)
- Sean Moffitt – mixing
- Warren David – mix assistant
- Dave McNair – mastering at Dave McNair Mastering (Winston-Salem, North Carolina)
- Michelle Box – A&R production
- Beth Lee – art direction
- Tim Parker – art direction
- Cameron Powell – photography
- Meegan Pearson – grooming
- David McCollum – management

== Chart performance ==
Chart (2015)	Peak position
US Top Christian Albums (Billboard)	27
US Heatseekers Albums (Billboard)	13
