= In My Arms (Plumb song) =

Single by Plumb

from the album Blink
- Released: 2007
- Recorded: 2006
- Genre: Adult Alternative, contemporary Christian music
- Length: 4:03 (Album Version)
- Label: Curb
- Songwriter(s): Bose, Bronleewe, Lee
- Producer(s): Jeremy Bose

Plumb singles chronology
"Real Life Fairytale" (2006)	"In My Arms" (2007)	"Hang On" (2009)

"In My Arms" is the lead single from Plumb's lullaby album Blink. "In My Arms" was remixed by Kaskade, Scotty K, Bronleewe & Bose, Gomi, and Bimbo Jones and hit the No. 1 spot on the Billboard Hot Dance Club Songs. The song was the 19th most played song on Christian Hit Radio stations in the U.S. in 2007 according to R&R magazine. It was also on the top of the Billboard Hot Dance Airplay chart and is the first song to appear on both charts. The single was released digitally.

The song was also used on the CW's One Tree Hill.

== Track listing ==
- Digital Single
1. "In My Arms" - 4:03
- Remix Single
1. "In My Arms" (Bronleewe & Bose Radio Edit) - 4:02
2. "In My Arms" (Bimbo Jones Radio Edit) - 3:43
3. "In My Arms" (Scotty K Radio Edit) - 4:46
4. "In My Arms" (Gomi Radio Edit) - 4:48
5. "In My Arms" (Bronleewe & Bose Extended Mix) - 7:36
6. "In My Arms" (Bimbo Jones Extended Mix) - 7:36
7. "In My Arms" (Scotty K Extended Klub Mix) - 9:15
8. "In My Arms" (Gomi Extended Mix) - 8:31
- Kaskade Mixes
1. "In My Arms" (Kaskade Extended Mix) - 7:07
2. "In My Arms" (Kaskade Radio Edit) - 3:40

== Chart performance ==
=== Weekly charts ===
Chart (2007)	Peak position
U.S. Billboard Hot Christian Songs	24
U.S. Billboard Hot Dance Club Play	3
U.S. Billboard Hot Dance Airplay	1
U.S. Billboard Hot Adult Contemporary Tracks	10
Global Dance Tracks	23

=== Year-end charts ===
Chart (2008)	Position
US Adult Contemporary (Billboard)	20

== Certifications ==
Region	Certification	Certified units/sales
United States (RIAA)	Gold	500,000^{‡}
^{‡} Sales+streaming figures based on certification alone.
