= I Need You Now =

I Need You Now may refer to:

- I Need You Now (album), a 2002 album by Smokie Norful
- "I Need You Now" (1954 song), a song written by Al Jacobs and Jimmie Crane
- "I Need You Now" (Agnes song), a 2009 song by Agnes Carlsson
- "(I Need You Now) More Than Words Can Say", a 1990 song by Alias

== See also ==
- Need You Now (disambiguation)
