= Hang On (Plumb song) =

Single by Plumb

from the album Beautiful History
- Released: 2009
- Recorded: 2009
- Genre: Pop; techno; CCM
- Length: 3:10 (album version)
- Label: Curb
- Songwriter(s): Tiffany Lee; Luke Sheets; Jaclyn James
- Producer(s): Matt Bronleewe

Plumb singles chronology
"Blink" (2007)	"Hang On" (2009)	"God Shaped Hole" (2009)

"Hang On" is a single from Plumb's third compilation album Beautiful History and is one of four original songs featured in the set. "Hang On" was recorded to be used in the 2009 original soundtrack to the film Twilight: New Moon but did not make the cut. The track reached the top spot of the Billboard Hot Dance Club Play in 2009 and was her first number-one single of 2010 on Billboard's Hot Dance Airplay chart.

In a profile and interview about the artist in Billboard, singer-songwriter Tiffany Lee Arbuckle notes that "Hang On" was written about finding hope when you feel hopeless, and dedicated it to her longtime fans.

== Track listing ==
- CD Cut
1. "Hang On" - 3:10
- Remixes
1. "Hang On" (Dave Audé Mix)
2. "Hang On" (Digital Dog Mix)
3. "Hang On" (Bronleewe & Bose Mix)
- Hang On (The Remixes) - Australia Only
1. "Hang On" (Digital Dog Radio Edit) - 3:11
2. "Hang On" (Dave Audé Radio Edit) - 4:09
3. "Hang On" (Peter Hammond Radio Edit) - 3:45
4. "Hang On" (Bronleewe & Bose Radio Edit) - 4:02
5. "Hang On" (Dave Audé Extended Mix) - 7:50
6. "Hang On" (Digital Dog Extended Mix) - 6:08
7. "Hang On" (Peter Hammond Extended Mix) - 7:27
8. "Hang On" (Bronleewe & Bose Extended Mix) - 5:11
9. "Hang On" (Dave Audé Club Dub) - 6:43
10. "Hang On" (Digital Dog Dub) - 6:09
11. "Hang On" (Dave Audé Dub Dub) - 6:40

== Charts ==
=== Weekly charts ===
Chart (2009–10)	Peak position
Russia Airplay (TopHit)	2
US Dance Club Songs (Billboard)	1
US Dance/Mix Show Airplay (Billboard)	1

=== Year-end charts ===
Chart (2010)	Position
Russia Airplay (TopHit)	18
US Dance/Mix Show Airplay (Billboard)	24
