= Love & the Outcome =

Canadian Christian music duo

- Origin: Winnipeg, Manitoba, Canada
- Genres: CCM, pop rock
- Years active: 2012–present
- Label: Word
- Members: Jodi King; Chris Rademaker
- Website: www.loveandtheoutcome.com

Love & the Outcome is a Canadian contemporary Christian music husband-wife duo from Winnipeg, Manitoba. They are on the Word Records label, and released their first album entitled Love & the Outcome on August 27, 2013. The album has had chart successes, and positive critical reception. They have appeared on three WOW Hits: "He Is With Us" on WOW Hits 2015; "King of My Heart" on WOW Hits 2016; and "The God I Know" on WOW Hits 2017.

== Background ==
On July 7, 2012, Love & the Outcome was formed in Winnipeg, Manitoba, Canada. The duo consists of husband Chris Rademaker and wife Jodi King. The couple have been married since December 2003.

== Music ==
In 2013, the duo was signed to Word Records, a major Christian music label in the United States.

On August 27, 2013, Love & the Outcome released their eponymously name Love & the Outcome. Love & the Outcome charted at No. 28 and No. 18 on the Top Christian Albums and the Top Heatseekers Albums charts respectively, for the Billboard charting week of September 14, 2013.

Love & the Outcome was part of the Winter Jam Tour 2015 West Coast.

On September 23, 2016, Love & the Outcome released These Are the Days, their second studio album. It peaked at No. 17 on both the Top Christian Albums and the Top Heatseekers Albums charts for the Billboard charting week of October 15, 2016.

In December 2016, the band toured with NewSong and Matthew West on the Very Merry Christmas Tour.

== Members ==
- Jodi King – vocals, keys, percussion (2012–present)
- Chris Rademaker – bass guitar, vocals (2012–present)

== Discography ==
=== Studio albums ===
List of studio albums, with selected chart positions
Title	Album details	Peak chart positions	
Title	Album details	US Christ	US Heat
Love & the Outcome	Released: August 27, 2013; Label: Word; Formats: CD, digital download	13	5
These Are the Days	Released: September 23, 2016; Label: Word; Formats: CD, digital download	17	17
Only Ever Always	Released: April 1, 2022; Label: Word; Formats: digital download	—	—

=== Extended plays ===
List of extended plays, with selected chart positions
Title	EP details	Peak chart positions	
Title	EP details	US Christ	US Heat
Christmas Songs	Released: November 10, 2017; Label: Word; Formats: CD, digital download	—	—
You Got This	Releasing: March 6, 2020; Label: Curb/Word; Formats: CD, digital download	—	—

=== Singles ===
List of singles, with selected chart positions
Year	Title	Peak chart positions			Album
Year	Title	US Christ	Christ Airplay	US Christ AC	Album
2013	"He Is with Us"	8	8	6	Love & the Outcome
2014	"King Of My Heart"	5	13	9	Love & the Outcome
2015	"Heart Like You"	40	28	—	Love & the Outcome
2016	"The God I Know"	7	2	—	These Are the Days
2019	"You Got This"	—	41	—	You Got This (EP)
2020	"Same Page"	—	—	—	You Got This (EP)
2020	"Moving On"	—	—	—	You Got This (EP)
2023	"Human"	—	—	—	Only Ever Always

== Other publications ==
In 2020, King released a book entitled “You Got This”.

== Awards and nominations ==
They won the 2013 GMA Canada Covenant Award for New Artist of the Year. Over the next 10 years they won six more GMA CC Awards.

The duo received a Dove Award nomination for 'New Artist of the Year' in 2014. The God I Know received nominations for the Juno Award and K-LOVE Fan Award.
