= About a Mile (album) =

Studio album by About a Mile
- Released: July 15, 2014
- Genres: Contemporary Christian music, Christian rock, contemporary worship music
- Length: 40:37
- Label: Word
- Producers: Howard Benson, Ian Eskelin

About a Mile chronology
About a Mile (2014)	Trust You All the Way (2016)

About a Mile is the first album by About a Mile. It was released by Word Records on July 15, 2014. About a Mile worked with Howard Benson and Ian Eskelin on the production of this album.

== Reception ==
Professional ratings
Review scores
Source	Rating
CCM Magazine	3/5 stars
Cross Rhythms	9/10 squares
Jesus Freak Hideout	3.5/5 stars
New Release Tuesday	4/5 stars

Signaling in a three star review by CCM Magazine, Matt Conner wrote, "About A Mile might be a band making their full-length debut, but their self-titled LP sounds as seasoned as any veteran release this year... A bit color-by-numbers, but it's a pretty picture nonetheless." Tony Cummings, in a nine out of ten review for Cross Rhythms, wrote, "'About A Mile' will seem predictable and generic to the hipsters but to less blinkered Christian radio listeners simply looking for spiritual uplift with well crafted, well performed songs, this will do very nicely." In a four-star review at New Release Tuesday, Kevin Davis said, "This is a great collection of confessional and authentic expressions of faith. The songs are poignant and powerful... If you want to experience an uplifting, soul-stirring and worshipful album, look no further than About A Mile." In rating the album three and a half stars, Alex "Tincan" Caldwell from Jesus Freak Hideout wrote, "Passion is a funny thing; it covers a multitude of musical shortcomings in the same way abundant sunshine can turn even the most mundane days better."

== Track listing ==
No.	Title	Writer(s)	Length
1.	"Satisfied"	Casey Brown, Adam Klutinoty, Jonathan Smith	3:48
2.	"Power of the Cross"	Casey Brown, Adam Klutinoty, Jonathan Smith	3:29
3.	"Who You Say You Are"	Casey Brown, Adam Klutinoty, Jonathan Smith	3:29
4.	"In With the Out Crowd"	Ian Eskelin, Adam Klutinoty, Levi Klutinoty, Luke Klutinoty, Tony Wood	3:04
5.	"Oxygen"	Ian Eskelin, Adam Klutinoty, Mark Weinberg	4:14
6.	"Right Now"	Ian Eskelin, Adam Klutinoty, Tony Wood	2:52
7.	"He Won't Stop Loving You"	Ian Eskelin, Adam Klutinoty, Tony Wood	3:12
8.	"S.O.S. (Hope Won't Let Go)"	Adam Klutinoty, Scott Stevens	3:49
9.	"I Hate Hate"	Ian Eskelin, Adam Klutinoty, Tony Wood	2:47
10.	"Soldier On"	Trey Bruce, Adam Klutinoty	2:29
11.	"Reason For Breathing"	Ian Eskelin, Adam Klutinoty	2:59
12.	"Trembling"	Adam Klutinoty, Levi Klutinoty, Luke Klutinoty	4:25
Total length:			40:37

== Charts ==
Chart (2015)	Peak position
US Top Christian Albums (Billboard)	32
US Heatseekers Albums (Billboard)	16
