= City Harbor (album) =

Studio album by City Harbor
- Released: February 4, 2014
- Genre: Contemporary Christian music, pop rock, acoustic
- Length: 35:17
- Label: Sparrow
- Producer: Matt Bronleewe, David Garcia, Ben Glover

City Harbor chronology
Come However You Are (2013)	City Harbor (2014)

City Harbor is the eponymously titled debut studio album by contemporary Christian music duo City Harbor, released on February 4, 2014 by Sparrow Records. The producers are Matt Bronleewe, David Garcia, Ben Glover. This album has attained positive reception by music critics and commercial successes.

== Critical reception ==
Professional ratings
Review scores
Source	Rating
CCM Magazine	3/5 stars
Christian Music Review	5/5 stars
The Christian Music Review Blog	3.5/5 stars
Christian Music Zine	4.25/5
CM Addict	4/5 stars
Cross Rhythms	8/10 squares
Indie Vision Music	3/5 stars
Jesus Freak Hideout	3.5/5 stars
Louder Than the Music	4/5 stars
New Release Tuesday	4.5/5 stars
Worship Leader	4.5/5 stars

City Harbor garnered positive reception from the ratings and reviews of music critics. Grace S. Aspinwall of CCM Magazine rated the album three stars, noting how the album "is cheerful and engaging" on which the release "is breezy and fun, and indicates good things to come from the pair." At Worship Leader, Barry Westman rated the album four-and-a-half stars, calling "The production quality is superior, the harmonies are ever so tight, very singable melodies, lyrics that draw you into worship, and an all around exceptional debut album." Stephen Curry of Cross Rhythms rated the album eight out of ten squares, stating that this is a "debut album to be proud of" by the duo.

At New Release Tuesday, Dawn Teresa rated the album four-and-a-half stars, writing that the album is a "beacon of hope, safely guiding troubled hearts through life's sometimes unsafe waters to find respite in the arms of a Savior who is an impregnable stronghold". Cortney Warner of Jesus Freak Hideout rated the album three-and-a-half stars, calling this "a modest and engaging effort, and it does a good job establishing" the duo. At Indie Vision Music, Jonathan Andre rated the album three stars, noting that the album lacks the "'WOW' factor", but is still an album that will be an enjoyable listening experience. Laura Chambers of Christian Music Review rated the album a perfect five stars, saying that "With an impressive debut, City Harbor lives up to their goal of drawing listeners to a safe haven where peace and rest are possible."

At Christian Music Zine, Joshua Andre rated the album four-and-a-fourth stars, calling this a "unique album" that "contains plenty of creative and courageous musical pathways", which are "profound and genuine moments of reassurance and truth, and both Molly and Robby harmonising well together and complementing each other vocally". Andrew Funderburk of CM Addict rated the album four stars, writing that "The album is consistent lyrically and musically" that allows "It's uplifting message after uplifting message, and that's what makes this album." At Louder Than the Music, Jono Davies rated the album four stars, highlighting that "This album has a very clean, fresh sound to it that you can not help but enjoy once you start listening." The Christian Music Review Blog's Jim Wilkerson rated the album three-and-a-half stars, calling this "a solid debut album" that "doesn't really stand out."

== Commercial performance ==
For the Billboard charting week of February 22, 2014, City Harbor was the No. 40 most sold album on the Top Christian Albums chart and the No. 27 most sold album on the breaking-and-entry chart the Top Heatseekers Albums.

== Track listing ==
No.	Title	Writer(s)	Length
1.	"Like I Am"	Molly Reed, Joshua Varnadore, Ben Glover	3:02
2.	"Come However You Are"	Robert Earle, Reed, David Garcia, Glover	3:41
3.	"I Still Believe"	Reed	4:16
4.	"Lift It Up"	Earle, Reed, Jeff Pardo	2:59
5.	"Somebody Tell Them"	Reed, Varnadore, Justin Ebach	3:43
6.	"I Will Rest"	Ebach, Glover, David Moffitt	3:24
7.	"Heartbeat"	Reed, Varnadore, Glover	3:02
8.	"Your Love Still Wins"	Reed, Glover	3:53
9.	"You're There"	Reed, Varnadore, Matt Bronleewe	3:51
10.	"Leave It Here"	Reed, Connie Rae Harrington, Jason Walker	3:32
Total length:			35:17

iTunes version
No.	Title	Writer(s)	Length
11.	"All That Matters" (bonus track)	Walker, Reed, Glover & Varnadore	3:35
Total length:			39:02

== Charts ==
Chart (2014)	Peak position
US Christian Albums (Billboard)	40
US Heatseekers Albums (Billboard)	27
