= Cast My Cares =

Studio album by Tim Timmons
- Released: June 4, 2013
- Studios: Electric Thunder Studios and Yackland Studios (Nashville, Tennessee)
- Genres: Contemporary Christian music, worship
- Length: 46:42
- Label: Reunion
- Producer: Paul Mabury

Tim Timmons chronology
Cast My Cares EP (2013)	Cast My Cares (2013)	Awake Our Souls (2015)

Singles from Cast My Cares
- 1. "Starts With Me" Released: March 22, 2013

Cast My Cares is the first studio album by contemporary worship musician Tim Timmons, which was released on the Reunion Records label on June 4, 2013, and it was produced by Paul Mabury. The lead single "Starts With Me" charted at No. 25 on the Christian Songs chart. In addition, the album has been met with acclaim by music critics, and commercial charting successes.

== Background ==
Timmons worked with noted Christian music producer Paul Mabury in the creation of this album, and he composed songs with Mabury and the noted Christian music composer Paul Moak on "Starts With Me", which is the lead single from the album. The song charted at No. 25 on the Christian Songs chart.

== Music and lyrics ==
Andy Argyrakis of CCM Magazine stated that "if Tim Timmons sounds like he's singing like his life depends on it, that's because he literally is", and that "just because the singer/songwriter spending the last 12 years battling an incurable cancer doesn't mean his spirit's been diminished in the least." At Christian Music Zine, Joshua Andre told that "while Tim may not have mastered the up-tempo songs well in this track list, the ballads are where he shines as an artist." The Phantom Tollbooth's Derek Walker said that "The music may have as much variety as his name, but this does have some better lyrical content than the average."

Jonathan Andre of Indie Vision Music stated that the listener was "given 11 songs written out of a place of heartfelt brokenness and needing to rely solely on Christ alone." At New Release Tuesday, Sarah Fine said that "Cast My Cares is one of the finest examples of raw, honest songwriting to come from a worship artist in a very long time." However, Fine pointed out that "the first half of the album does feel stronger than the latter, and while it never boasts a surplus of musical diversity, the chill pop/soul style Timmons has chosen suits him extremely well, and is done in such a way that draws you in song after song." Fine touched on that "the album is an 11-song flight that openly chronicles Tim's personal relationship with Christ over the last several years, through the mountaintops and the messes."

At Worship Leader, Amanda Furbeck stated that "Cast My Cares, is an inspiring invitation to follow Jesus and worship him completely, in brokenness and gratitude. Timmons’ focus on ministry, rather than stardom, alongside his amazing perspective, allows for moving musical and spiritual transparency in Cast My Cares. This album has many gentle pop ballads and powerful, top-40-style worship songs, while Timmons’ captivating vocals shift all attention to Christ." On the other hand, Furbeck noted that "the quick tempos of Timmons’ music may make learning his worship songs a challenge for both vocalists and instrumentalists, however, his poignant lyrics make the extra effort worthwhile."

Jono Davies at Louder Than the Music stated that Timmons "has created a very modern stylish sound, mixed with raw and honest lyrics that aren't afraid to tell the listener that no matter how he feels, he never forgets about God's grace." Jesus Freak Hideout's Mark Rice said he "cannot say Cast My Cares is not without its highlights, nor that it is in any way, shape, or form a bad album (although at least half of the album seems to fall under the category of "filler")." Additionally, Rice sees that "Timmons clearly has a vision and a mission for his craft which is reflected in the album's airtight theme and personal and legitimately solid (at times) songwriting." Laura Chambers of Christian Music Review affirmed that "Cast My Cares, is an invitation for us to go deeper; for church to be who we are, not where we go."

== Critical reception ==
Professional ratings
Review scores
Source	Rating
Alpha Omega News	A−
CCM Magazine	4/5 stars
Christian Music Review	4.5/5 stars
Christian Music Zine	4.5/5 stars
Cross Rhythms	8/10 squares
Indie Vision Music	4/5 stars
Jesus Freak Hideout	3/5 stars
Louder Than the Music	4/5 stars
New Release Tuesday	4.5/5 stars
The Phantom Tollbooth	3/5 stars
Worship Leader	5/5 stars

Cast My Cares has garnered critical acclaim by music critics to critique the album. At CCM Magazine, Andy Argyrakis proclaimed that Timmons "delivers 11 inspiring eleven guitar-driven, modern pop tunes about putting complete trust in the Lord and striving to live a life worthy of a lasting legacy." Joshua Andre of Christian Music Zine affirmed that "Cast My Cares is a brilliant debut album that speaks about tough and uncomfortable issues yet still gives us hope and encouragement that God is here." In addition, Andre wrote that "Tim's 11 gems and treasures, therefore have a heavenly perspective, and as we hear the anthems and prayers of someone not wanting to keep up with the latest CCM trend or fashion, we are reminded that God is there."

At Indie Vision Music, Jonathan Andre evoked that "Cast My Cares is a breath of fresh air (or more specifically, fresh sounds of electric guitars, acoustic guitar strums and passionate vocals)". Sarah Fine of New Release Tuesday highlighted that Timmons' "ability to balance one's own personal struggles authentically, while still being able to lay them down them with wholehearted abandon, is refreshing and vastly laudable." Also, Fine called the effort "unquestionably one of the strongest releases of the year by a male vocalist, you'll definitely want to keep an eye on this rising artist." At Cross Rhythms, Dr. A T Bradford highlighted that "Such is the quality of the material here it becomes obvious why Reunion Records have signed Mr Timmons." At Worship Leader, Amanda Furbeck proclaimed that "Tim Timmons is a musician on a mission", but she found "Timmons’ efforts are not aimed at becoming the next greatest worship rock star, but rather to invite people to be with Jesus."

Laura Chambers of Christian Music Review declared that the release was "well worth a listen" because "Cast My Cares is a compelling call to give control to a God who we can trust completely, if we’d only leap." At Louder Than the Music, Jono Davies told that "this album is well worth exploring. " At Alpha Omega News, Rob Snyder told that "Tim Timmons is living the title of his debut CD." However, Mark Rice of Jesus Freak Hideout wrote that "but in the vast majority of cases, the only real thing that sets this album apart from other artists within the AC/Worship niche is his vocals." On the other hand, Rice concluded that "but overall, I do like what Timmons is trying to say, and I dearly hope that he can come to say it in a more memorable way in the near future." At The Phantom Tollbooth, Derek Walker felt that "as Cast My Cares progresses, it doesn't develop and one song begins to sound just like several others. By the end, there's nothing memorable or indispensable."

== Commercial performance ==
For the Billboard charting week of June 22, 2013, Cast My Cares was the No. 15 most sold album in the breaking and entry chart of the United States by the Top Heatseekers and it was the No. 20 Top Christian Album as well.

== Track listing ==
Track list
No.	Title	Writer(s)	Length
1.	"It's Your Revolution"	Tim Timmons, Jason Walker	3:30
2.	"Starts With Me"	Paul Moak, Timmons	3:20
3.	"Cast My Cares"	Alli Rogers, Timmons	4:18
4.	"You Remain"	Paul Alan, Timmons	3:32
5.	"Christ In Me"	Paul Mabury, Rogers, Timmons	3:43
6.	"Let's Be Beautiful"	Rogers, Timmons	4:11
7.	"For Your Glory"	Mia Fieldes, Mabury, Timmons	7:38
8.	"I Will Follow Love"	Roger, Timmons	3:56
9.	"Great Reward"	Roger, Timmons	4:15
10.	"Holy Unafraid"	Timmons, Walker	3:52
11.	"Only One Standing"	Rogers, Timmons	4:27
Total length:			46:42

== Personnel ==
- Tim Timmons – vocals
- Tim Lauer – keyboards
- Matt Stanfield – keyboards
- Stu G – guitars
- Stephen Leiweke – guitars
- Gabe Scott – acoustic guitar, lap steel guitar, banjo, hammered dulcimer
- Tony Lucido – bass
- Paul Mabury – drums
- Cara Fox – cello

Backing vocals

- Jerad Atherton, Jackie Barnard, Katie Bender, Drew Bray, Ryan Clark, Russell Crain, Andrew Degrasse, Stu G, Emily Gomez, Karrie Hardwick, Kim Johnson, Tim Lauer, David Leonard, Tony Lucido, Hillary McBride, Dominik Michalzic, Joel Owen, Scott Owen, Luke Peach, Keeley Reed, Molly Reed, Jared Rich, Roy Schenkenberger, Shane Stenner, Lindsay Wallace and Cathi Workman

Kids vocals

- Gabriel Morlan, Hannah Morlan, Isaiah Morlan, Madelynn Morlan, Samuel Morlan and Malia Timmons

=== Production ===
- Terry Hemmings – executive producer
- Jordyn Thomas – A&R
- Paul Mabury – producer
- Geoff Piller – engineer
- Stephen Leiweke – engineer
- Sean Moffitt – mixing
- Joe Causey – editing
- Devon Vaughan – editing
- Andrew Mendelson – mastering at Georgetown Masters (Nashville, Tennessee)
- Michelle Box – A&R production
- Tim Parker – art direction
- Brian Hurst – design
- Daley Hake – photography
- Julie Belle – grooming
- Abby Middlemas – wardrobe
- David McCollum – management

== Chart performance ==
Chart (2013)	Peak position
US Top Christian Albums (Billboard)	13
US Heatseekers Albums (Billboard)	13
