= Redeemed =

Single by Big Daddy Weave

from the album Love Come to Life
- Released: May 3, 2012
- Recorded: 2011–12
- Studio: Bletchley Park, (Nashville, TN), Little Big Sound, (Nashville, TN), Red 91 Productions, (Mt. Juliet, TN)
- Genre: CCM, folk, worship
- Length: 4:36
- Label: Fervent/Curb
- Songwriters: Benji Cowart; Mike Weaver

Big Daddy Weave singles chronology
"Love Come to Life" (2012)	"Redeemed" (2012)	"The Only Name (Yours Will Be)" (2013)

Music video
- "Redeemed" on YouTube

"Redeemed" is a song by contemporary Christian band Big Daddy Weave from their 2012 album Love Come to Life. It was released on May 3, 2012, as the second single. The song became Weave's second Hot Christian Songs No. 1, staying there for seven weeks. It lasted 54 weeks on the overall chart, becoming their longest-charting single to date. They briefly crossed over to secular radio, peaking at #25 on the Billboard Bubbling Under Hot 100. The song is played in a B major key, and 127 beats per minute.

== Background ==
"Redeemed" was released on May 3, 2012, as the second single from their seventh studio album, Love Comes to Life. The song is a testimony to the power of redemption. Weaver revealed that the message of the song is an understanding of how God's love for him can redeem his own self-image. He told NewReleaseToday: "'I don't doubt that God loves me; my parents showed that to me. and I've never doubted how God feels about me. There's this problem of never letting that translate to how I feel about myself. I walked around carrying this self-deprecating, self-hating feeling. I sank into a depressed state. I remember being in my garage, my man cave. One day after a workout, I was hating myself. I prayed, 'God, I know You love me completely, but why can't I love me?' I felt the Holy Spirit invade that space in my garage, and He began to deal with my heart. God began to fill my heart and my mind with the stuff that He likes about me. It's unbelievable that the King of the Universe cares about me. He does that because of the blood of Jesus. He made me. He knows me more than anyone else. He told me He loved my smile and my heart for people. He put that inside of me. He broke down that self-hating feeling. I've been sharing my story for the past year, and it has brought people out of the woodwork. It dawned on me one night that I don't feel like I hate myself anymore. That healing is available to all of us. We just need to make ourselves vulnerable before the Lord."

== Music video ==
The music video for the single "Redeemed" was released on May 3, 2012. The video shows the band performing the song live.

== Charts ==
=== Weekly charts ===
Chart (2012)	Peak position
US Bubbling Under Hot 100 (Billboard)	25
US Christian AC (Billboard)	1
US Hot Christian Songs (Billboard)	1
US Christian AC Indicator (Billboard)	1
US Christian Soft AC (Billboard)	1
US Heatseekers Songs (Billboard)	18

=== Year-end charts ===
Chart (2012)	Peak position
US Christian Songs (Billboard)	15
US Christian AC (Billboard)	16
Chart (2013)	Peak position
US Christian Songs (Billboard)	10
US Christian AC (Billboard)	10

=== Decade-end charts ===
Chart (2010s)	Position
US Christian Songs (Billboard)	18

== Certifications ==
Region	Certification	Certified units/sales
United States (RIAA)	2× Platinum	2,000,000^{‡}
^{‡} Sales+streaming figures based on certification alone.
