= About a Mile =

American Christian music band

- Origin: Butler, Pennsylvania
- Genres: Contemporary Christian music, Christian rock, contemporary worship music
- Years active: 2009–present
- Label: Word
- Members: Adam Klute; Levi Klute; Luke Klute
- Website: aboutamile.com

About a Mile are an American Christian music band with three members, all brothers, from Butler, Pennsylvania. The band started making music in 2009. Word Records signed the band in 2016 and released their first album: About a Mile.

== Background ==
About a Mile is a Christian band from Butler, Pennsylvania.

The band's name originates from the belief that Jesus carried his cross "about a mile". The band has been included on Winter Jam and have toured with Sidewalk Prophets, DecembeRadio and more.

The band consists of brothers Adam, Luke and Levi Klutinoty, who released their self-titled album on July 15, 2014. The recording quickly launched onto the retail charts to become 2014's biggest selling Christian album debut from a new artist.

- Adam Klute (Adam Daniel Klutinoty) – guitar, lead vocals
- Levi Klute (Levi James Paul Klutinoty) – drums
- Luke Klute (Luke Aaron Klutinoty) – bass

== Discography ==
List of studio albums, with selected chart positions
Title	Album details	Peak chart positions	
Title	Album details	US Christ	US Heat
About a Mile	Released: July 15, 2014; Label: Word Records; Format: CD, digital download	32	16
Trust You All the Way	Released: October 28, 2016; Label: Radiate Music; Format: CD, digital download	—	—
