= City Harbor =

American contemporary Christian music duo

- Origin: Nashville, Tennessee, U.S.
- Genres: Contemporary Christian music, pop rock acoustic
- Years active: 2011–2016
- Labels: Sparrow
- Past members: Josh Varnadore; Molly Reed; Robby Earle; Steven Taylor
- Website: cityharbormusic.com

City Harbor was a contemporary Christian music duo from Nashville, Tennessee. They released their first album, City Harbor, on February 4, 2014 through Sparrow Records. The album and its two lead singles have achieved positive critical reception, commercial and radio airplay success.

== Background ==
In 2011, City Harbor was formed in Nashville, Tennessee and it consisted of duo Molly Reed and Josh Varnadore. However, Varnadore left the duo in late 2012 for a ministry opportunity in Texas. So Robby Earle was added as the male part of the duo.

In 2012, the duo were signed to Sparrow Records, a major Christian music label in the United States.

=== City Harbor ===
On February 4, 2014, they released City Harbor which had two singles: "Somebody Tell Them" that charted at a peak of No. 32 on the Billboard Christian Songs chart and "Come However You Are" that peaked at No. 31 on the same chart. They released version of "It's the Most Wonderful Time of the Year", which charted at No. 47 on the Christian Songs chart.

== Members ==
Former

- Josh Varnadore — vocals, guitar
- Steven Taylor — vocals, drums, guitar
- Molly Reed — vocals, guitar
- Robby Earle -- vocals, guitar, piano

== Discography ==
=== Studio albums ===
List of studio albums, with selected chart positions
Title	Album details	Peak chart positions	
Title	Album details	US Christ	US Heat
City Harbor	Released: February 4, 2014; Label: Sparrow; CD, digital download	40	27

=== Singles ===
List of singles, with selected chart positions
Title	Year(s)	Peak chart positions				Album
Title	Year(s)	US Christian Songs	US Christian AC	US Christian AC Ind	US CHR AIR	Album
"Somebody Tell Them"	2012–13	32	27	28	—	City Harbor
"Come However You Are"	2013–14	31	—	22	25	City Harbor
"It's the Most Wonderful Time of the Year"		47	—	—	—	
