= Exhale (Plumb album) =

Studio album by Plumb
- Released: May 4, 2015
- Studio: The Treehouse Studio (Nashville, Tennessee)
- Genre: Contemporary Christian music, worship
- Length: 50:45
- Label: Word, Curb
- Producer: Matt Bronleewe

Plumb chronology
Need You Now (2013)	Exhale (2015)	Beautifully Broken (2018)

Singles from Exhale
- 1. "Lord I'm Ready Now" Released: 2014; 2. "Exhale" Released: 2015; 3. "Smoke" Released: 2015

Exhale is the seventh studio album by Plumb. Word Records alongside Curb Records released the album on May 4, 2015. Plumb worked with Matt Bronleewe in the production of this album.

== Background ==
This album follows her 2013 album, Need You Now, that was also produced by Matt Bronleewe, as well as, Exhale. The album was released on May 4, 2015, by Word Records and Curb Records, making the album her seventh studio album.

== Critical reception ==
Professional ratings
Review scores
Source	Rating
365 Days of Inspiring Media	4.5/5 stars
CCM Magazine	4/5 stars
Christian Music Review	4.5/5
Christian Review Magazine	5/5 stars
CM Addict	3/5 stars
Cross Rhythms	10/10 squares
FDRMX	4.1 stars on a 5 point scale
Jesus Freak Hideout	4.5/5 stars 4/5 stars
New Release Tuesday	4/5 stars

Awarding the album four stars at CCM Magazine, Matt Conner states, "Plumb's latest offering, Exhale, continues her streak of heartfelt, resonate releases marked by memorable melodies ... Overall it's a well-rounded set of songs from a respected artist who has been there." Alex Caldwell, assigning the album four and a half stars for Jesus Freak Hideout, writes, "Exhale ... portray[s] an honest journey of faith and doubt, of hope and pain." Giving the album four stars by Michael Weaver from Jesus Freak Hideout, says, "Exhale is an exceptional album worthy of your attention." In a four star review by New Release Tuesday, Jonathan J. Francesco describes, "this album is a rewarding and roaring success, combining passionate vocals, lyrics, melodies, and music into a tight and accessible package."

Writing a 4.1 star review for FDRMX, Joe Frazier states, "Exhale ... beautifully reflects His loving us in our worst state while having done all of the work to move us to a redeemed state". Rating the album a ten out of ten for Cross Rhythms, Tim Holden writes, "There really are no weak tracks here and it is very easy to be drawn into the emotions of every one of them and taken up with the honest and uplifting lyrics. A must have album." DeWayne Hamby, reviewing the album for Charisma, writes, "Plumb delivers a collection of modern worship songs about healing, restoration, redemption and, most of all, hope in the midst of darkness...Exhale is not only an album of hope but most of all a personal worship experience. Although, mellower that Plumb's early rock releases, it still should appeal to longtime listeners as well as those searching for songs to express their heavenly gratitude to Jesus Christ."

Justin Sarachik, writing a positive review from Breathecast, says, "Every song on Exhale has a purpose and a succinct vision of what it needs to be to push her journey of peace in God along." Awarding the album four and a half stars from 365 Days of Inspiring Media, Joshua Andre writes, "With such a smorgasbord and myriad of relevant topics explored and musical genres delved into; there is something on Exhale for everyone!" Abby Baracskai, giving a 4.5 out of five rating by Christian Music Review, says, "Plumb is crazy talented and able to create a masterpiece of inspiration like nobody else can." In rating the album three stars for CM Addict, Brianne Bellomy writes, "the album is a great followup to her last album". Writing for Christian Review Magazine Leah St. John rating the album five stars, describes, "EXHALE is a highly inspirational album".

== Track listing ==
Standard edition
No.	Title	Writer(s)	Length
1.	"Exhale"	Tiffany Arbuckle-Lee, Matt Armstrong, Josh Silverberg	3:42
2.	"Lord I'm Ready Now"	Arbuckle-Lee, Luke Sheets	3:33
3.	"Smoke"	Arbuckle-Lee, Eric Marshall	4:29
4.	"Resurrection"	Jared Anderson, Arbuckle-Lee	4:52
5.	"Great Is Our God"	Marshall	4:24
6.	"My True Love"	Arbuckle-Lee, Matt Bronleewe, Sheets	3:56
7.	"Broken Places"	Arbuckle-Lee, Mia Fieldes, Stuart Garrard	3:45
8.	"Faithful"	Arbuckle-Lee, Brian Hitt, Amy Perry	4:16
9.	"Champion"	Arbuckle-Lee, Jason Ingram, Sarah MacIntosh	4:23
10.	"Sleep Will Be Sweet"	Arbuckle-Lee, Justin Ebach, Sam Tinnesz	3:48
11.	"When You Walk Into the Room"	Bryan & Katie Torwalt	5:00
12.	"Restored"	Arbuckle-Lee, Jason Walker	4:37
Total length:			50:45

Deluxe edition
No.	Title	Writer(s)	Length
13.	"We Stand for You"	Arbuckle-Lee, Bronleewe	3:57
14.	"You Are Enough"	Arbuckle-Lee, Michael Farren	3:37

== Personnel ==
- Plumb – all vocals
- Matt Bronleewe – all instruments, programming, guitars
- Ruslan Odnoralov – additional programming
- Jeremy Gifford – guitars
- Chris Carmichael – string arrangements and performer

Gang vocals (Tracks 1, 5, 7, 11 & 12)

- Jeremy Gifford, Tiffany Lee, Hannah Loomis, Jarrod Morris, Nate Onstott, Christina Sanchez and Miranda Telford

=== Production ===
- Chris Bradstreet – executive producer, management
- Bryan Stewart – executive producer, A&R
- Matt Bronleewe – producer, engineer
- John DeNosky – additional editing
- Ainslie Grosser – mixing
- Tom Coyne – mastering at Sterling Sound (New York, NY)
- Randy Merrill – mastering assistant
- Lani Crump – production coordinator
- Blair Munday – art direction
- Alexis Ward – design
- Jenn Cody – photography
- Samantha Roe – styling
- Edward St. George – hair, make-up
- Street Talk Media – management

== Charts ==
Chart (2015)	Peak position
US Billboard 200	81
US Christian Albums (Billboard)	3
