= Love & the Outcome (album) =

Studio album by Love & the Outcome
- Released: August 27, 2013
- Genre: Contemporary Christian music, pop rock
- Length: 40:28
- Label: Word
- Producer: David Garcia, Ben Glover, Seth Mosley, Jeff Pardo

Love & the Outcome chronology
Love & the Outcome EP (2013)	Love & the Outcome (2013)

Love & the Outcome is the debut studio album from the contemporary Christian music duo Love & the Outcome. The album was produced by David Garcia, Ben Glover, Seth Mosley, and Jeff Pardo. It was released on August 27, 2013 by Word Records. The album has seen commercial charting successes as well as positive critical attention.

== Background ==
The album was released by Word Records on August 27, 2013. It was produced by David Garcia, Ben Glover, Seth Mosley, and Jeff Pardo.

== Music and lyrics ==
Grace S. Aspinwall at CCM Magazine said that "While the songwriting lacks the depth demonstrated by contemporaries like Matthew West", "the label debut...is versatile and smart, clean-cut pop." At Jesus Freak Hideout, Jen Rose stated that the album was "a catchy introduction to the duo, showcasing bright pop rock sounds and a deep trust in God." Rose also described the release as "not too musically or lyrically ambitious". Sarah Fine agreed with Rose that "While new ground isn't being broken here in a musical sense, it firmly establishes familiar ground in a highly noticeable way," and that "With each track, you feel as if you're being warmly invited into the duo's home to listen, learn, and relate to their life experiences." Indie Vision Music's Jonathan Andre stated that "Jodi and Chris have unveiled their vulnerability to unmask 11 tracks of honesty and transparent songwriting." At Christian Music Zine, Joshua Andre agreed that the lyrics were "very personal and emotional".

Rose described Love & the Outcome as "thematically relatable enough" with an "optimistic message" that "is uplifting". Also, Fine wrote that "The recurring themes of selfless love and trusting in God's sovereignty despite facing some of life's toughest circumstances shine throughout, and never once feel overwhelming or repetitive." Joshua Andre said that "on this seamless easy to listen 11 tracks of hope, testimony, and encouragement, wrapped up in the genre of pop, with plenty of upbeat tracks next to transparent heartfelt ballads." Lorie Haire at Christian Music Review wrote that "this album is a story through lyrics of the struggles and triumphs that this husband and wife duo have gone through while chasing their dreams and pursuing their calling in music."

== Critical reception ==
Professional ratings
Review scores
Source	Rating
CCM Magazine	3/5 stars
Christian Music Review	3.9/5
The Christian Music Review Blog	3/5
Christian Music Zine	4.75/5
Indie Vision Music	4/5 stars
Jesus Freak Hideout	3.5/5 stars
New Release Tuesday	4/5 stars

Love & the Outcome garnered generally positive reception by music critics to critique the album. At CCM Magazine, Grace S. Aspinwall called the album "Happy and full of life" that she noted was "a promising start". Jen Rose of Jesus Freak Hideout told that this was "a record that exudes confidence." At New Release Tuesday, Sarah Fine felt that "Love & The Outcome is one of the strongest debut releases of 2013, by a group well worth keeping on your radar."

Jonathan Andre of Indie Vision Music called this "an inspiring and motivational album." At Christian Music Zine, Joshua Andre told that he "totally loved Love & The Outcome’s debut album". Jim Wilkerson at The Christian Music Review Blog stated that this album was not "fresh and different", however he felt that "the entire album is filled with lovely sounds." At Christian Music Review, Lori Haire told that the album "has something to offer spiritually."

== Commercial performance ==
For the Billboard charting week of September 14, 2013, Love & the Outcome was the No. 18 most sold album in the breaking and entry chart of the United States by the Top Heatseekers and it was the No. 28 Top Christian Album as well.

== Track listing ==
Standard edition
No.	Title	Writer(s)	Length
1.	"When We Love"	David Garcia, Ben Glover, Jodi King, Chris Rademaker	4:07
2.	"He Is with Us"	King, Seth Mosley, Rademaker	3:46
3.	"No Mistaking (It's You)"	Garcia, Glover, King, Rademaker	3:14
4.	"City of God"	King, Mosley, Rademaker	3:32
5.	"Ask"	Jason Ingram, King, Mosley, Rademaker	3:43
6.	"The Story You're Building in Me"	Ed Cash, Garcia, Glover, King, Rademaker	4:01
7.	"Closer to You"	Matt Hammitt, King, Mosley, Rademaker	3:19
8.	"Bring Us Back"	Garcia, Glover, King, Rademaker	3:44
9.	"King of My Heart"	Dave Barnes, King, Jeff Pardo, Rademaker	3:24
10.	"Heart Like You"	Seth Jones, King, Rademaker	3:51
11.	"What a Promise"	King, Mosley, Rademaker	3:47
Total length:			40:28

iTunes Bonus Tracks
No.	Title	Length
12.	"I See You"	3:57
13.	"Your Way"	3:41
14.	"What It Looks Like"	3:17

== Charts ==
Chart (2013)	Peak position
US Christian Albums (Billboard)	28
US Top Heatseekers Albums (Billboard)	18
