= Real (Plumb song) =

Single by Plumb

from the album Beautiful Lumps of Coal
- Released: 2004
- Recorded: 2003
- Genre: Pop rock
- Length: 3:42 (Album Version)
- Label: Curb
- Producer(s): Jay Joyce

Plumb singles chronology
"Free" (2003)	"Real" (2004)	"Boys Don't Cry" (2004)

"Real" is the lead single from Plumb's studio album Beautiful Lumps of Coal. It reached the No. 41 position in the UK. The single was released digitally and physically.

== Track listing ==
1. "Real" - 3:42
2. "Nice, Naive & Beautiful" - 4:15

== Music video ==
The music video for "Real" shows Tiffany inside of a closet with a sleek dress and gloves on. It is in black & white.

== Chart performance ==
Chart (2003–04)	Position
UK Rock & Metal (OCC)	13
UK Singles (OCC)	41
US Adult Pop Airplay (Billboard)	30
