= Beautiful Lumps of Coal =

Studio album by Plumb
- Released: March 25, 2003
- Studios: The Bennett House and Langley Studios (Franklin, Tennessee); Curb Studios, Ivy Park Studios The Maxwell House (Nashville, Tennessee)
- Genres: Pop; Rock
- Length: 41:05
- Label: Curb
- Producers: Shaun Shankel; Jay Joyce; Jimmy Collins; Plumb

Plumb chronology
The Best of Plumb (2000)	Beautiful Lumps of Coal (2003)	Simply Plumb (2005)

Singles from Beautiful Lumps of Coal
- 1. "Free" Released: 2003; 2. "Real" Released: 2004; 3. "Boys Don't Cry" Released: 2004; 4. "Sink N' Swim" Released: 2004

Professional ratings
Review scores
Source	Rating
Artistdirect	3/5 stars
Jesus Freak Hideout	4/5 stars
Cross Rhythms	9/10 stars
The Phantom Tollbooth	5/5 stars

Beautiful Lumps of Coal is the third album by Christian singer Plumb. After undergoing many member changes, a record label change and marriage, Tiffany Arbuckle Lee decided to go solo. This release features the songs "Real", "Sink-N-Swim", "Free" and "Boys Don't Cry".

== Track listing ==
1. "Free" (Tiffany Arbuckle Lee, Matt Bronleewe) – 3:29
2. "Sink N' Swim" (Lee, Jimmy Collins) – 3:29
3. "Without You" (Lee, Jay Joyce) – 3:31
4. "Boys Don't Cry" (Lee, Bronleewe) – 3:48
5. "Hold Me" (Lee, Joyce) – 3:40
6. "Walk Away" (Lee, Bronleewe) – 3:28
7. "Taken" (Lee, Shaun Shankel, Kyle Jacobs) – 4:15
8. "Nice Naïve and Beautiful" (Lee) – 4:15
9. "Unnoticed" (Lee, Collins) – 3:08
10. "Real" (Lee, Christa Wells) – 3:42
11. "Love'em & Kiss'em" (Brandon Arbuckle) – 0:21
12. "Go" (Lee, Wells) – 3:52

=== Singles ===
- "Free" (2003)
- "Sink N' Swim" (2004)
- "Real" No. 30 Billboard Adult Top 40 (2004)

== Personnel ==
- Plumb – vocals, acoustic piano
- Shaun Shankel – programming, string arrangements
- Jimmy Collins – acoustic piano, programming, string programming, arrangements
- Jay Joyce – Fender Rhodes, Hammond organ, programming, guitars
- Paul Moak – Fender Rhodes, guitars, pedal steel guitar, sitar
- Kyle Jacobs – acoustic guitar
- Tracy Ferrie – bass
- Michael Caton Jones – drums
- Marissa Barkey – violin
- Brandon Arbuckle – vocals

The Nashville String Machine

- David Angell, David Davidson, Conni Ellisor, Carl Gorodetzky, Jim Grosjean, Jack Jezioro, Lee Larrison, Bob Mason, Carol Neuen-Rabinowitz, Pamela Sixfin, Gary Vanosdale, Mary Kathryn Vanosdale and Kristin Wilkinson – string players

=== Production ===
- Jeremy Lee – executive producer
- Bryan Stewart – executive producer
- Jay Joyce – producer, engineer
- Jimmy Collins – producer
- Plumb – producer, assistant producer, wardrobe
- Shaun Shankel – producer
- Brandon Arbuckle – engineer
- Jason Hall – engineer
- Skye McCaskey – engineer
- Craig White – engineer
- Casey Wood – engineer
- David Thoener – mixing
- Leslie Richter – assistant engineer
- Jeffrey Fernandez – mix assistant
- Jim Lightman – Pro Tiools, digital editing
- George Marino – mastering at Sterling Sound (New York, NY)
- Glenn Sweitzer – art direction, design
- Danny Clinch – photography
- Gabriel Trujillo – hair stylist, make-up
- Trish Townsend – wardrobe

== Chart performance ==
Week #	Heatseekers	Contemporary Christian
1	33	32

== Cover ==
"Boys Don't Cry" was translated into French by Elsa Lunghini, as "Pour une vue du paradis", and released on her fifth studio album, De lave et de sève (2004).
