= Everfound (album) =

Studio album by Everfound
- Released: July 16, 2013
- Genres: Christian rock, Christian alternative rock, pop rock
- Length: 44:40
- Label: Fervent
- Producer: Pete Kipley: Seth Mosley

Everfound chronology
Colorful Alibis & Scandalous Smiles (2009)	Everfound (2013)

Everfound is the first studio album by Christian rock brother band Everfound, which was released on July 16, 2013, and was produced by Pete Kipley and Seth Mosley. The album charted on the Billboard 200 at No. 195 and the Top Christian Albums chart at No. 9, and has received generally positive reception by music critics.

== Critical reception ==
Professional ratings
Review scores
Source	Rating
CCM Magazine	4/5 stars
Christian Music Zine	4.5/5 stars
Cross Rhythms	8/10 squares
Digital Journal	4/5 stars
HM	3/5 stars
Indie Vision Music	4/5 stars
Jesus Freak Hideout	3.5/5 stars
New Release Tuesday	4/5 stars
Worship Leader	3/5 stars

Everfound garnered generally positive reception from music critics. At CCM Magazine, Matt Conner felt that "the personal story of Everfound is interesting [...] their anthemic pop-rock is an equal draw", which he stated because of a few songs on the album it "shows the vast potential for this import." Joshua Andre of Christian Music Zine called the album "one to savour over and over again", and told that his "listening experience [was] an enjoyable one."

At Digital Journal, Markos Papadatos felt that the release was "well-written", and noted that "Nikita soars on lead vocals and his brothers are delightful on harmonies." Cimarron Hatch at Indie Vision Music felt that "these are all wonderful songs that have great messages for people to hear and enjoy." At Cross Rhythms, Lins Honeyman told that "All in all, this is an accomplished and exhilarating first offering from a band with a very bright future indeed."

At Jesus Freak Hideout, Mark Rice highlighted that the project "is a perfect example of a young band searching for their musical identity in the midst of an industry that requires a quota of radio songs on each album." Roger Gelwicks of Jesus Freak Hideout found that the band "has an remarkable precedent to build upon." At New Release Tuesday, Kevin Davis called the effort "the top alt-rock album of the year" that has "incredibly tight guitar riffs and amazing harmonies", and he felt that "this album is by far the catchiest, most energetic and emotionally engaging alternative rock album" that he has listened to in 2013.

However, Sarah Brehm at HM stated that the album "is a mix of upbeat dance songs and soulful, melodic tunes with poetic lyrics", and told that the band "has been slowly gaining popularity in the pop-piano-rock genre, and this popularity is only going to soar with its self-titled debut album." At Worship Leader, Randy W. Cross evoked that "lyrically, Everfound is overtly Christian-influenced and uplifting, a slight departure from their previous independent releases", and noted that "the addition of an acoustic track or a capella track would have taken this album to the next level."

== Commercial performance ==
For the Billboard charting week of August 3, 2013, the album charted at No. 195 on the Billboard 200 chart, and the album charted at No. 9 on the Top Christian Albums chart.

== Track listing ==
Everfound
No.	Title	Writer(s)	Length
1.	"Pyatigorsk"	Ruslan Odnoralov	0:38
2.	"Go"	Pete Kipley, Nikita Odnoralov, Ruslan Odnoralov, Yan Odnoralov	3:30
3.	"Unless"	Matt Bronleewe, Nikita Odnoralov, Ruslan Odnoralov	3:22
4.	"Never Beyond Repair"	Seth Mosley, Nikita Odnoralov, Ruslan Odnoralov, Yan Odnoralov	3:30
5.	"Count the Stars"	Casey Brown, Nikita Odnoralov, Ruslan Odnoralov	4:05
6.	"God of the Impossible"	Casey Brown, Nikita Odnoralov, Ruslan Odnoralov	4:28
7.	"Hallelujah"	Nikita Odnoralov, Ruslan Odnoralov	2:44
8.	"Somewhere New"	Nikita Odnoralov	2:57
9.	"Hurt"	Seth Mosley, Nikita Odnoralov, Ruslan Odnoralov, Yan Odnoralov	3:35
10.	"Lubit Lish Hristos Bezmerna"	Ruslan Odnoralov	1:07
11.	"Torch"	Ian Eskelin, Nikita Odnoralov, Ruslan Odnoralov, Yan Odnoralov	3:16
12.	"Take This City" (featuring Joel Smallbone of for King & Country)	Casey Brown, Nikita Odnoralov, Ruslan Odnoralov, Yan Odnoralov, Joel Smallbone	4:39
13.	"We Are Alive"	Ian Eskelin, Nikita Odnoralov, Ruslan Odnoralov, Yan Odnoralov, Tony Wood	3:14
14.	"What Love Means"	Seth Mosley, Nikita Odnoralov, Ruslan Odnoralov	3:35
Total length:			44:40

== Charts ==
Chart (2013)	Peak position
US Billboard 200	195
US Top Christian Albums (Billboard)	9
