= Blink (Plumb album) =

Studio album by Plumb
- Released: October 9, 2007
- Recorded: 2007
- Studio: Pentavarit (Nashville, Tennessee)
- Genre: Pop: Rock
- Length: 46:06
- Label: Curb
- Producer: Jeremy Bose

Plumb chronology
Chaotic Resolve (2006)	Blink (2007)	Beautiful History (2009)

Professional ratings
Review scores
Source	Rating
Jesus Freak Hideout	4.5/5 stars
allmusic	3.5/5 stars

Blink is the fifth album by Christian singer Plumb. Released in 2007 via Curb Records, it is a collection of songs inspired by the singer's experiences as a mother. The album includes the single "In My Arms."

== Track listing ==
1. "My Sweet, My Lovely" (Tiffany Arbuckle Lee, Shaun Shankel) – 4:01
2. "God Will Take Care of You" – 4:55
3. "In My Arms" (Jeremy Bose, Matt Bronleewe, Lee) – 4:03
4. "Always" (Lee, Shankel) – 3:44
5. "Children of the Heavenly Father" (Lina Sandell) – 5:29
6. "Blink" (Bose, James E. Collins, Lee) – 3:56
7. "My Child" (Bose, Lee, Melissa Snyder) – 4:29
8. "Me" (Lee, Christa Wells) – 4:33
9. "Sleep" (Bronleewe, Lee) – 5:20
10. "Solomon's Song" (Bronleewe, Lee) – 5:18

=== Singles ===
- "In My Arms" No. 3 Billboard Hot Dance Music/Club Play Charts, No. 10 Billboard Hot Adult Contemporary Tracks, No. 24 Hot Christian Songs

== Personnel ==
- Plumb – all vocals, arrangements (2, 5)
- Jeremy Bose – programming, arrangements (2, 5)
- Clint Lagerberg – guitars
- David Davidson – violin
- Tamara Smith – whistle

=== Production ===
- Jeremy Lee – executive producer
- Bryan Stewart – executive producer, A&R
- Jeremy Bose – producer, recording, mixing (1, 2, 4–10)
- Rusty Varenkamp – editing, mixing (3)
- Hank Williams – mastering at MasterMix (Nashville, Tennessee)
- John Ozier – A&R coordinator
- Omni Communications Group – design
- Fernando Juarez – illustration
- Sepetys Entertainment Group, Inc. – management

== Chart performance ==
Hot Christian Albums
23

== Awards ==
In 2008, the album was nominated for a Dove Award for Pop/Contemporary Album of the Year at the 39th GMA Dove Awards.
