= Tim Timmons (musician) =

American musician (born 1976)

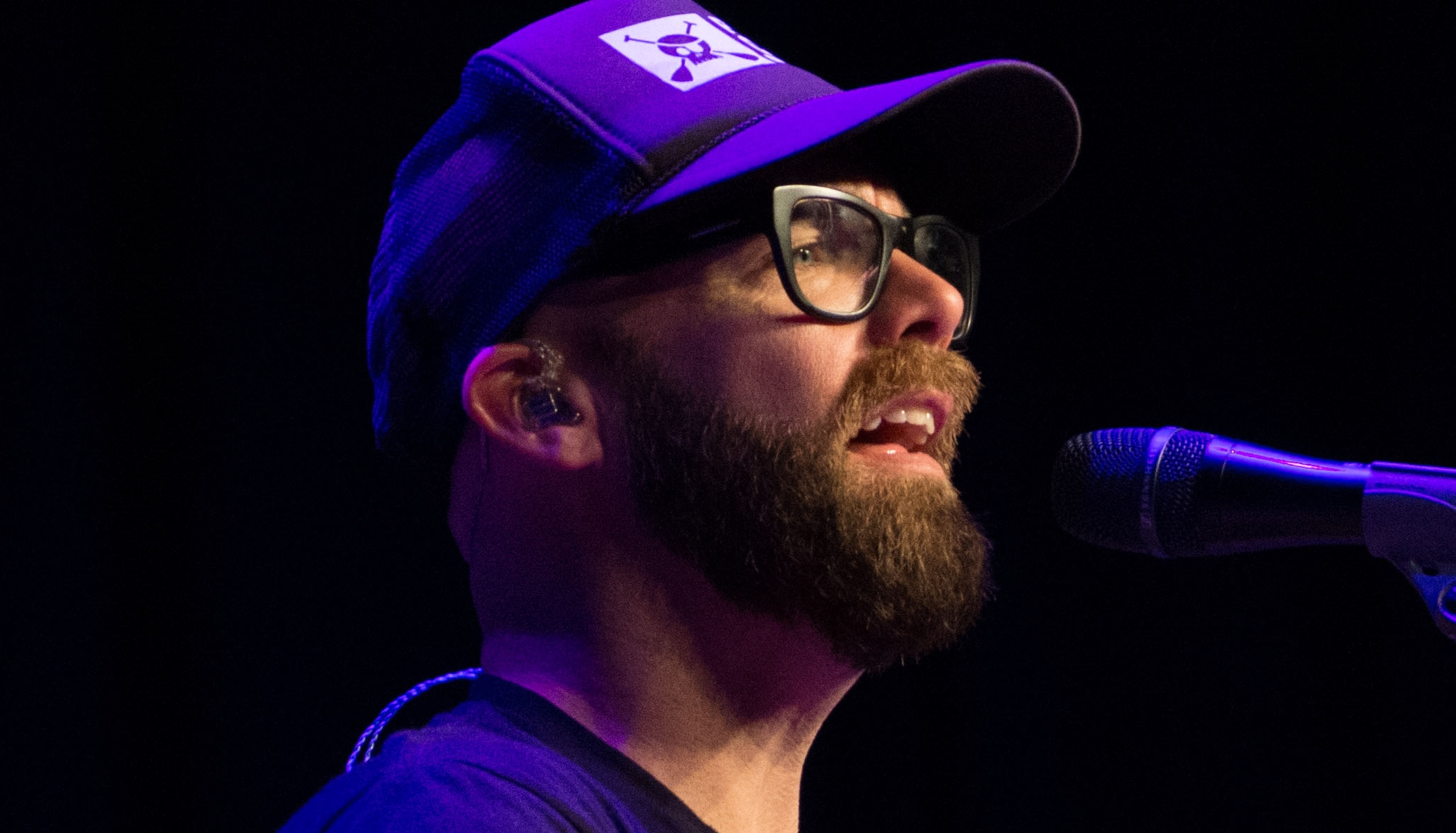
- Tim Timmons in 2014

Background information
- Born: Timothy Howard Timmons; February 9, 1976 (age 50); Irvine, California
- Genres: Worship, contemporary Christian music
- Years active: 2003–present
- Labels: Reunion, Integrity
- Website: timmonsmusic.com

Timothy Howard Timmons (born February 9, 1976) is an American musician, who sings contemporary worship and contemporary Christian music, and is currently signed to Reunion Records. His debut studio album Cast My Cares was released on June 4, 2013, and Paul Mabury produced the album. The lead single from that album released on March 22, 2013, and it has reached No. 21 on the Christian Songs chart.

== Background ==
Timmons was born on February 9, 1976. Timmons is married to Hilary Beth Timmons, whose birth name is Hilary Beth Larson, and they have four children together, who are Malia, Noah, and twins Aaron and Anna. Since 1998, he has been a worship leader for Mariners Church in Irvine, California.

Doctors told him he had five years left to live after a cancer diagnosis was made in June 2001.

== Music ==
Timmons was signed to Reunion Records in 2013. His first studio album was produced by Paul Mabury, and is entitled Cast My Cares, which was released on June 4, 2013. He was selected to open for MercyMe during the band's 2013 Rock and Worship Roadshow. Timmons released his album, HERE, with Integrity Music on April 16, 2021.

== Discography ==
=== Studio albums ===
Year	Album details	Peak chart positions	
Year	Album details	US Christian	US Heat
2013	Cast My Cares: Released: June 4, 2013; Label: Reunion; Format: CD, digital download	13	13
2015	Awake Our Souls: Released: October 2, 2015; Label: Reunion; Format: CD, digital download	27	13
2021	HERE: Released: April 16, 2021; Label: Integrity Music; Format: digital download	—	—

=== Singles ===
Year	Single	Chart positions		Album
Year	Single	US Christ	US Christ Air.	Album
2013	"Starts With Me"	21		Cast My Cares
2015	"Awake Our Souls"	—	33	Awake Our Souls
2016	"Everywhere I Go"	—	36	Awake Our Souls
2018	"I Belong" (featuring Amy Grant)	—	39	non-album single
2020	"You Never Let Go" (featuring Tammi Haddon)	—	—	non-album single
