= Chaotic Resolve =

Studio album by Plumb
- Released: February 28, 2006
- Recorded: 2005
- Studios: Pentavarit and Platinum Lab (Nashville, Tennessee); The Bennett House, Dark Horse Recording and The Playground (Franklin, Tennessee); Czech TV Recording Studio (Prague, Czech Republic)
- Genres: Rock; pop; metal; electronica
- Length: 60:34
- Label: Curb
- Producer: Matt Bronleewe

Plumb chronology
Simply Plumb (2005)	Chaotic Resolve (2006)	Blink (2007)

Singles from Chaotic Resolve
- 1. "I Can't Do This" Released: June 21, 2005; 2. "Better" Released: October 1, 2005; 3. "Cut" Released: March 8, 2006; 4. "Bittersweet"; 5. "Real Life Fairytale" Released: 2006

Professional ratings
Review scores
Source	Rating
Jesus Freak Hideout	4.5/5 stars
Cross Rhythms	10/10 squares
The Phantom Tollbooth	4/5 stars

Chaotic Resolve is the fourth album by Christian singer Plumb. It was released by Curb Records on February 28, 2006, and includes the single "Cut."

== Track listing ==
No.	Title	Writer(s)	Length
1.	"Blush (Only You)"	Tiffany Arbuckle-Lee; Matt Bronleewe	3:49
2.	"I Can't Do This"	Arbuckle-Lee; Bronleewe	4:03
3.	"Real Life Fairytale"	Arbuckle-Lee; Bronleewe	5:05
4.	"Better"	Arbuckle-Lee; Bronleewe; Shaun Shankel	4:10
5.	"Manic"	Arbuckle-Lee; Bronleewe	3:57
6.	"Cut"	Arbuckle-Lee; Brandon Arbuckle; Jeremy Bose; Bronleewe	4:01
7.	"Bittersweet"	Arbuckle-Lee; Bronleewe	4:49
8.	"Good Behavior"	Arbuckle-Lee; Arbuckle; Bronleewe	4:01
9.	"Motion"	Arbuckle-Lee; Bronleewe	3:54
10.	"I Have Nothing"	Arbuckle-Lee; Bronleewe; Savannah Packard	2:52
11.	"Jekyll & Hyde"	Arbuckle-Lee; Shankel	4:35
12.	"Sleep"	Arbuckle-Lee; Bronleewe	5:46

Bonus tracks
No.	Title	Writer(s)	Length
13.	"Damaged" (Redemption extended version)	Arbuckle-Lee; Thad Beaty; Bronleewe	5:49
14.	"Pray for Me"	Wayne Kirkpatrick; Michael W. Smith	3:36
Total length:			60:27

== Personnel ==
- Plumb – all vocals, Wurlitzer electric piano (11)
- Jeremy Bose – programming
- Matt Bronleewe – guitars (1–4, 7–10, 12), additional programming (2, 3, 5, 8–11), additional guitars (5)
- Greg Everett – guitars (5), additional guitars (7)
- James Gregory – bass (1–5, 7–12)
- Joe Porter – drums (1, 3, 4, 8–12)
- Lindsay Jamieson – drums (2, 5, 7)
- Ric Robbins – cuts (2, 5, 7)
- Prague Philharmonic Orchestra – strings (2, 4, 7, 12)
- Keith Getty – string arrangements (2, 4, 7, 12)
- Joni McCabe – string conductor (2, 4, 7, 12)
- Rockefeller Jones – screams (4)

=== Production ===
- Jeremy Lee – executive producer
- Bryan Stewart – executive producer
- Matt Bronleewe – producer, mixing (14)
- Aaron Swihart – engineer
- David Streit – assistant engineer (1, 8, 10, 11), additional recording (1, 8, 10, 11)
- Michael Modesto – assistant engineer (2, 5, 7), additional recording (5, 7)
- Michael Morena – assistant engineer (3, 4, 9, 12), additional recording (3, 4, 9, 12)
- Milan Jilek – string recording (2, 4, 7, 12)
- Mark Endert – mixing (1–12) at Scream Studios (Studio City, California)
- David Thoener – mixing (14)
- Stewart Whitmore – digital editing (1–3, 5–14)
- Chris Henning – digital editing (4)
- Stephen Marcussen – mastering
- Marcussen Mastering (Hollywood, California) – editing and mastering location
- Alice Smith – production coordinator
- Glenn Sweitzer – art direction, design
- Kristin Barlowe – photography
- Melanie Shelley – hair, make-up
- Star Klem – stylist
- Flatrock Management – management

== Singles and promotion ==
"I Can't Do This" was the album's first single released to radio, followed by "Better." Both songs were later released as retail singles on the iTunes Store, each featuring a remix. "Real Life Fairytale" appeared on the soundtrack to the 2005 film The Perfect Man, and was released as a retail CD single in the United Kingdom in 2006.

"Cut" was the album's third retail single, released as a remix bundle for digital download. It peaked at #26 on Billboard's Hot Dance Airplay chart. Later, it appeared in a 2009 episode of The Vampire Diaries titled "The Tipping Point".

"Blush (Only You)" was the iTunes Store's free Single of the Week for April 4–10, 2006.
