= Need You Now (How Many Times) =

Single by Plumb

from the album Need You Now
- Released: July 17, 2012
- Genre: CCM; pop rock
- Length: 4:12
- Label: Curb
- Songwriters: Tiffany Arbuckle Lee, Luke Harry Walker Sheets, Christa Nichole Wells

Plumb singles chronology
| "Drifting" (2011) | "Need You Now (How Many Times)" (2012) |

Music video
- "Need You Now" on YouTube

"Need You Now (How Many Times)" is a song by Christian contemporary Christian musician Plumb from her sixth studio album, Need You Now. It was released on July 17, 2012, as the second single from the album.

== Composition ==
"Need You Now (How Many Times)" was written by Tiffany Arbuckle Lee, Luke Harry Walker Sheets and Christa Nichole Wells.

== Release ==
The song "Need You Now (How Many Times)" was digitally released as the second single from Need You Now on July 17, 2012.

== Track listing ==
- Remix EP
1. Need You Now (How Many Times) (Swedish Xian Revolution Dubstep Mix) 3:54
2. Cut (Slovak Dubstep Mix) 4:42
3. Need You Now (How Many Times) (Swedish Xian Revolution Electro Mix) 4:49
4. Beautiful History (Dave Aude Radio Edit) 4:17
5. Beautiful History (Almighty Radio Edit) 3:47
6. Beautiful History (Scotty K Radio Edit) 4:35
7. Beautiful History (Ian Neiman Club Mix) 7:41
8. Beautiful History (Dave Aude Club Mix) 8:06
9. Beautiful History (Almighty Club Mix) 6:37
10. Beautiful History (Scotty K Club Mix) 8:03
- The Remixes
1. Need You Now (How Many Times) (Dave Aude Radio Edit) 3:43
2. Need You Now (How Many Times) (Dohr & Mongold vs Stefan Dabuck Radio Edit) 3:12
3. Need You Now (How Many Times) (Redtop Radio Edit) 3:29
4. Need You Now (How Many Times) (Wawa Radio Edit) 3:46
5. Need You Now (How Many Times) (J-C Radio Edit) 3:34
6. Need You Now (How Many Times) (Dave Aude Club Mix) 7:09
7. Need You Now (How Many Times) (Dohr & Mongold vs Stefan Dabuck Remix) 5:40
8. Need You Now (How Many Times) (Redtop Club Mix) 6:50
9. Need You Now (How Many Times) (Wawa Club Mix) 7:13
10. Need You Now (How Many Times) (J-C Club Mix) 6:58
11. Need You Now (How Many Times) (Acoustic Live Version) 4:12
- Bryan Kearney Remix
1. Need You Now (How Many Times) (Bryan Kearney Radio Edit) 4:19
2. Need You Now (How Many Times) (Bryan Kearney Remix) 7:25

== Uses ==
The song appeared on the compilation album WOW Hits 2014.

It also appeared in the 2016 biographical drama film I'm Not Ashamed.

== Charts ==
=== Weekly charts ===
| Charts (2012) | Peak position |
|---|---|
| US Bubbling Under Hot 100 (Billboard) | 21 |
| US Hot Christian Songs (Billboard) | 3 |
| US Christian Airplay (Billboard) | 3 |
| US Christian AC (Billboard) | 4 |
| US Christian AC Indicator (Billboard) | 7 |
| US Christian Soft AC (Billboard) | 13 |
| US Christian CHR (Billboard) | 1 |
| US Dance Club Songs (Billboard) | 4 |
| US Heatseeker Songs (Billboard) | 21 |

=== Year-end charts ===
| Chart (2012) | Peak position |
|---|---|
| US Christian Songs (Billboard) | 46 |

| Chart (2013) | Peak position |
|---|---|
| UK Cross Rhythms Annual Chart | 2 |
| US Christian Songs (Billboard) | 11 |

== Certifications ==
| Region | Certification | Certified units/sales |
|---|---|---|
| United States (RIAA) | Gold | 500,000^{‡} |
^{‡} Sales+streaming figures based on certification alone.
