= Cut (Plumb song) =

Single by Plumb

from the album Chaotic Resolve
- Released: August 29, 2006
- Recorded: 2005
- Genre: Contemporary Christian music
- Length: 4:00 (album version); 4:06 (Bronleewe & Bose radio edit)
- Label: Curb
- Songwriters: Brandon Arbuckle; Jeremy Bose; Matt Bronleewe; Tiffany Lee
- Producer: Matt Bronleewe

Plumb singles chronology
"I Can't Do This" (2005)	"Cut" (2006)	"Blush" (2006)

Alternative covers
- Cut — The Remixes

"Cut" is a single from Plumb's album Chaotic Resolve, which was released digitally.

The song was also featured in The CW TV Show "The Vampire Diaries" in the 10th episode of season 1, "The Turning Point".

== Song meaning ==
Plumb wrote the song about self harm (cutting). She was quoted in an interview saying that the song was "inspired by a girl involved in self-injury. It encompasses truth and beauty within such a painful subject, which metaphorically suggests the ability for goodness to come out of anguish."

== Track listing ==
- Radio Edit single
1. "Cut" (Bronleewe & Bose radio edit) — 4:06
- The Remixes single
1. "Cut" (Bronleewe & Bose club mix) — 5:53
2. "Cut" (Jay Joyce Monster mix) — 5:30
3. "Cut" (Andy Hunter mix) — 7:40

== Music video ==
The music video shows Tiffany at the piano with pictures surrounding her. It is in black & white.

In August 2010 Plumb wrote about shooting a new video for the song. In December she wrote in response to a fan's question that she was unhappy with it and decided not to release it even though the shooting took 4 days.

== Chart performance ==
Chart (2006/2010)	Peak position
US Christian Songs (Billboard)	26
US Hot Dance Airplay (Billboard)	5
UK Indie (OCC)	14

== Awards ==
In 2007, the song was nominated for a Dove Award for Rock/Contemporary Album of the Year at the 38th GMA Dove Awards.
