= Everfound (band) =

American Christian rock band

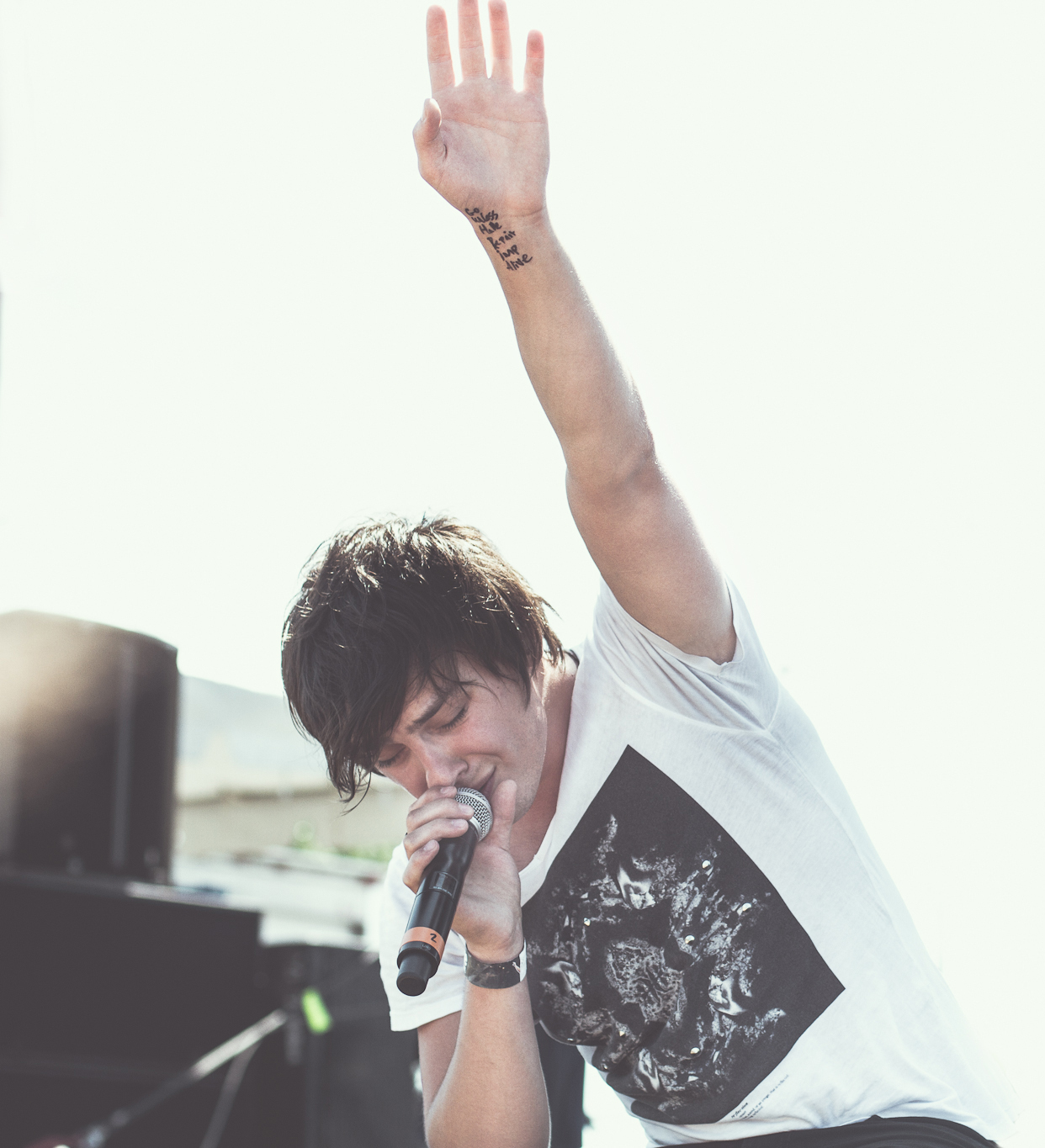
- Nikita Odnoralov of Everfound at the Sonshine Festival in 2013

Background information
- Origin: Denver, Colorado, U.S.
- Genres: Indie rock, pop rock, alternative, Christian rock
- Years active: 2005–present
- Label: Word
- Members: Nikita Odnoralov; Ruslan Odnoralov; Yan Odnoralov
- Past members: Illarion Odnoralov; Ernest Minayev
- Website: www.everfoundmusic.com

Everfound was a Christian-rock band based in Denver, Colorado, consisting of three brothers, Ruslan, Nikita, and Yan. The Odnoralov family moved from Russia to Colorado in 1996. Since their formation, they have independently released three EPs and one full length independent album, Colorful Alibis and Scandalous Smiles. They released their national debut, major-label, self-titled album on July 16, 2013, as well as a remix of several songs released exclusively on Spotify, on August 5, 2014, followed by a Christmas EP, Resolution, on November 11.

== Saint Nomad ==
In 2018 the trio re-branded themselves as Saint Nomad with influences including Tame Impala and Phantogram. Their debut single, "El Dorado", was followed by an album: Momento Mori. In 2020 the trio returned with a new single, "Nothing To Lose".

== Discography ==
=== Studio albums ===
Year	Album details	Peak chart positions	
Year	Album details	US 200	US Christian
2009	Colorful Alibis & Scandalous Smiles: Released: 2009; Label: Independent; Format: CD, digital download	—	—
2013	Everfound: Released: July 16, 2013; Label: Word Records; Format: CD, digital download	195	9

=== Studio albums as Saint Nomad ===
Year	Album details	Peak chart positions	
Year	Album details	US 200	US Christian
2018	Momento Mori: Released: 2018; Label: Format: digital download		
