= Love Come to Life =

Studio album by Big Daddy Weave
- Released: April 17, 2012
- Recorded: 2011–12
- Studio: Bletchley Park, (Nashville, TN); Little Big Sound, (Nashville, TN); Red 91 Productions, (Mt. Juliet, TN) (Note: According to the inner liner notes of the album.)
- Genre: Contemporary Christian music, folk, contemporary worship music
- Length: 51:38
- Label: Fervent/Curb
- Producer: Jeremy Redmon

Big Daddy Weave chronology
The Ultimate Collection (2011)	Love Come to Life (2012)	Beautiful Offerings (2015)

Love Come to Life is the seventh studio album by Christian contemporary Christian music band Big Daddy Weave. The album released on April 17, 2012, by Fervent Records and Curb Records. The album was produced by band member Jeremy Redmon. The album has charted on Billboard 200 and Christian Albums charts at Nos. 68 and 8, respectively. The song that was released as the lead single from the album was "Love Come to Life," which peaked at No. 6 on the Christian Songs chart, and the second song was "Redeemed," reached No. 1, becoming their second song to achieve the feat.

== Background ==
=== Concept ===
The title and the meaning behind the album is the sheer fact that we as Christian preached and talk about the love of God, but God says that people will know we belong to the kingdom by the way we show his love not just talk about his love.

=== Recorded ===
This album was recorded in 2011–12 at the following studios: Bletchley Park in Nashville, Tennessee, Little Big Sound in Nashville, TN and Red 91 Productions in Mt. Juliet, Tennessee. (Note: According to the inner liner notes of the album.)

=== Produced ===
The album was produced by bandmate Jeremy Redmon.

== Composition ==
The album is about our hearts' cry out to God in order for him to answer our questions because the band says some of the songs don't contain the answers, but are meant to encourage us a believers to seek out the answers from our maker.

== Singles ==
The first radio single was "Love Come to Life". This song has attained No. 6 on the Christian Songs chart. The second single was "Redeemed". This song charted at No. 1 on that chart, as well.

== Critical reception ==
Professional ratings
Review scores
Source	Rating
CCM Magazine (Grace S. Aspinwall)	3/5 stars
Christian Music Zine (Tyler Hess)	3/5 stars
Christianity Today (Robert Ham)	2/5 stars
Indie Vision Music (Jonathan Andre)	3/5 stars
Jesus Freak Hideout (Roger Gelwicks)	3/5 stars
Louder Than The Music (Jono Davies)	3.5/5 stars
New Release Tuesday (Kevin Davis)	4.5/5 stars
Worship Leader (Randy Cross)	4.5/5 stars

CCM Magazine's Grace S. Aspinwall said that "Big Daddy Weave has a like-ability factor rivaled only by their musical talent...and both come to light in their latest album, Love Come To Life.

Christian Music Zine's Tyler Hess said that "the album definitely plays it too safe for my taste, but that tends to be the status quo for contemporary Christian music, so here’s another log on the fire."

Christianity Today's Robert Ham said that "Their albums come out like clockwork, and the music on them fall into a niche of adult contemporary pop with few frills and fewer surprises. Their new disc follows this template to the letter, fluttering along in the background with piano-driven balladry and mid-tempo barroom stompers. Were it not for an inspiring heart that urges themselves and their listeners to move their lives forward in the light of the Lord, this album would have little to recommend it."

Indie Vision Music's Jonathan Andre said that "Love Come to Life would be fresh and invigorating, something new from the band that would stand out among other albums in 2012. Listening to the album a few times, I can say that this is one of the most honest, mature, and lyrically provoking albums from Big Daddy Weave." In addition, Andre wrote that "Big Daddy Weave has improved yet again from their last studio album What Life Would be Like. With heartfelt lyrics and creative musical arrangements, this is an album that will stand tall amongst others throughout their career."

Jesus Freak Hideout's Roger Gelwicks said that "CCM fanatics everywhere have only more reason to rejoice with Big Daddy Weave's return from hibernation, as the sugary-sweet pop hooks, shiny choruses, and inspirational moments aren't in short supply. Without much distinction to speak of, this album will no doubt get its fans, but lose them quickly to the band that mimics them next. In the end, Love Come to Life will satisfy fans of Christian radio, as well as any of the aforementioned bands, but perhaps no more than that."

Louder Than The Music's Jono Davies said that "from the moment you hear the sound of the opening track, you know what you are going to get in style and sound. There isn't necessarily anything new in style or music, but what you do get is a whole album full of great, strong, honest songs with solid sound quality and production that will be please all fans of this band. "

New Release Tuesday's Kevin Davis said that "after repeated listens, the sincere and poignant lyrics, musical excellence and Mike Weaver’s compelling vocals make Love Come To Life my new top album by this great band surpassing all of their previous excellent albums."

Worship Leader's Randy Cross said that the album "continues to solidify the sound that has made them one of Christian music’s most sought after and respected groups. The album features music for rolling down the car window and turning up the volume, or rolling up your sleeves and bringing your church into God’s presence." Furthermore, Cross wrote that "as you listen to Love Come to Life, it is easy to see Big Daddy Weave garners their lyrical content from life experiences. With each track you’re swept into the incredible awe of our God who works through the everyday situations of our lives to bring us to maturity. Contemplative and celebratory, Love Come to Life reminds you that there are others who share this walk of trial and blessing, with its unexpected range of emotions, and unforeseen circumstances."

== Track listing ==
Tracklist
No.	Title	Writer(s)	Length
1.	"Jesus Move"	Mike Weaver, Phil Wickham	5:20
2.	"Magnificent God"	Stu G, Weaver	4:58
3.	"Love Come to Life"	Jeremy Redmon, Jim Scherer, Weaver	3:46
4.	"Stay"	Paul Baloche, Weaver	3:42
5.	"Different Light"	Don Chaffer, Jeff Pardo, Weaver	4:10
6.	"If You Died Tonight"	Carl Cartee, Weaver	3:52
7.	"Redeemed"	Benji Cowart, Weaver	4:36
8.	"The Only Name (Yours Will Be)"	Cowart	4:21
9.	"Save My Life"	Weaver	3:43
10.	"Maker of the Wind"	Paul Alan, Weaver	4:30
11.	"Give My Life Away"	Chaffer, Pardo, Weaver	3:11
12.	"Overwhelmed"	Weaver, Wickham	5:29
Total length:			51:38

== Personnel ==
Big Daddy Weave

- Mike Weaver – lead and backing vocals, keyboard programming, acoustic guitars,
- Jeremy Redmon – keyboards, programming, electric guitars, banjo, mandolin, percussion, glockenspiel, backing vocals
- Joe Shirk – keyboards, Hammond B3 organ, saxophone, backing vocals
- Jay Weaver – bass guitar
- Jeff Jones – drums

Additional Musicians

- David Leonard – keyboards (1–4), percussion (1, 2), backing vocals (1–6, 8, 9, 13, 14), harmonium (6)
- Ben Shive – string arrangements (6, 7, 9), keyboards (7, 9, 10, 13)
- Ben Phillips – drums (1–14)
- Brian Beihl – percussion (15), drums (16, 17)
- John Catchings – cello (6, 7, 9)
- Matt Nelson – cello (15)
- Kristin Wilkinson – viola (6, 7, 9)
- David Angell – violin (6, 7, 9)
- David Davidson – violin (6, 7, 9)
- Anna Redmon – backing vocals (1, 2, 4, 5, 7–9)
- Karrie Hardwick – backing vocals (1, 5, 8)
- Natalie Leonard – backing vocals (1, 5, 8)
- Summer Friesen – backing vocals (1, 5, 8)
- Toby Friesen – backing vocals (1, 5, 8)
- Randy Williams – backing vocals (2, 5, 8)
- Jason Morant – backing vocals (6), keyboards (12)
- World Vision Kisongo Makuyuni Adp Maasai Children's Choir – choir (12)

=== Production ===
- Josh Bailey – A&R
- Jeremy Redmon – producer, overdub tracking, mixing (16, 17)
- Ben Phillips – tracking engineer
- Baheo "Bobby" Shin – string engineer
- Ainslie Grosser – mixing (1–14)
- Shane D. Wilson – mixing (15)
- Dan Shike – mastering at Tone And Volume Mastering (Nashville, Tennessee)
- Jason Jenkins – A&R administration
- Nicole Curtis – A&R administration
- Jamie Haynes – A&R administration
- Shane Tarleton – creative director
- Katherine Petillo – art direction
- Kevin Tucker – design
- Eli McFadden – photography
- Amber Lehman – wardrobe
- Kirsten Pate – stylst
- John Clore – brand management

== Charts ==
Chart (2012)	Peak position
US Billboard 200	68
US Top Christian Albums (Billboard)	8

== Certifications ==
Region	Certification	Certified units/sales
United States (RIAA)	Gold	500,000^{‡}
^{‡} Sales+streaming figures based on certification alone.
