= Plumb (Plumb album) =

Studio album by Plumb
- Released: July 29, 1997
- Recorded: 1997
- Studios: The Bennett House (Franklin, Tennessee); October Studios (Nashville, Tennessee); The Salt Mine (Brentwood, Tennessee)
- Genres: Alternative rock; pop rock
- Length: 44:46
- Label: Essential
- Producers: Matt Bronleewe; Dan Haseltine

Plumb chronology
Plumb (1997)	candycoatedwaterdrops (1999)

Singles from Plumb
- 1. "Sobering (Don't Turn Around)" Released: 1997; 2. "Unforgivable" Released: 1997; 3. "Crazy" Released: 1997; 4. "Endure" Released: 1997; 5. "Who Am I?" Released: 1997

Professional ratings
Review scores
Source	Rating
AllMusic	3/5 stars
Cross Rhythms	9/10 squares
Jesus Freak Hideout	4/5 stars
The Phantom Tollbooth	4/5 stars

Plumb is the debut studio album by Christian singer-songwriter Plumb. The album was not only a success for herself, but also for Matt Bronleewe. This was Bronleewe's first role producing.

== Track listing ==
1. "Sobering (Don't Turn Around)" (Brandon Arbuckle, Tiffany Arbuckle Lee, Matt Bronleewe, Dan Haseltine) - 3:44
2. "Who Am I?" (Arbuckle Lee, Bronleewe) - 4:12
3. "Unforgivable" (Arbuckle Lee, Bronleewe) - 3:42
4. "Endure" (Arbuckle Lee, Bronleewe, Jeremy Bose) - 3:53
5. "Willow Tree" (Arbuckle Lee, Chris Graffagnio) - 4:50
6. "Concrete" featuring Dan Haseltine (Bronleewe, Haseltine) - 3:36
7. "Crazy" (Arbuckle Lee, Bronleewe) - 2:50
8. "Pennyless" (Arbuckle Lee, Bronleewe) - 3:02
9. "Cure" (Arbuckle Lee, Bronleewe) - 4:42
10. "Send Angels" (Arbuckle Lee, Bronleewe, Haseltine) - 5:16
11. "Pluto" hidden track - 4:57

== Personnel ==
Plumb

- Tiffany Arbuckle Lee – all vocals
- Matt Stanfield – keyboards, Rhodes electric piano, programming
- Stephen Leiweke – guitars
- J. J. Plasencio – bass
- Joe Porter – drums

Additional musicians

- Matt Bronleewe – keyboards, percussion, guitars (1–4, 7, 11), bass (7)
- Jeremy Bose – Wurlitzer electric piano
- Dan Haseltine – keyboards, percussion, backing vocals (6)
- Jeff Savage – keyboards, Wurlitzer electric piano, programming
- Matt Slocum – guitars (2), cello
- Stephen Mason – guitars (3, 6)
- Chris Graffagnio – guitars (5)
- Ruprict Domingo – baritone guitar, upright bass
- Adam Anders – bass (1–6, 8–10)
- Miguel DeJesus – bass (11)
- Dale Baker – drums, percussion
- Shaneekwa Duck – drums, percussion
- Eric Fritsch – additional arrangements (5)

"Alien" Choir on "Pluto"

- Tiffany Arbuckle Lee, Matt Bronleewe, Karin Bronleewe, Miguel DeJesus, Joe Porter and Tara Treat

=== Production ===
- Robert Beeson – executive producer
- Matt Bronleewe – producer
- Dan Haseltine – producer
- Aaron Swihart – engineer
- Shawn McLean – second engineer
- Greg Parker – second engineer
- Glenn Spinner – assistant engineer
- Martin Woodlee – assistant engineer
- Rick Will – mixing
- F. Reid Shippen – mix assistant
- Ken Love – mastering at MasterMix (Nashville, Tennessee)
- Shye Communications – art direction, design
- Matthew Barnes – front cover photography
- Norman Jean Roy – band photography
- Melanie Shelly – hair, make-up

== Chart performance ==
- No. 28 Billboard Top Contemporary Christian
