= Need You Now (Plumb album) =

Studio album by Plumb
- Released: February 26, 2013
- Recorded: 2010–2011
- Studios: The Treehouse Studio, Pentavarit and Yackland Studios (Nashville, Tennessee); PVD Studio (Berlin, Germany)
- Genres: CCM, pop rock, alternative rock, soft rock
- Length: 51:33
- Label: Curb
- Producers: Matt Bronleewe; Paul van Dyk

Plumb chronology
Beautiful History (2009)	Need You Now (2013)	Exhale (2015)

Singles from Need You Now
- 1. "Drifting" Released: August 30, 2011; 2. "Need You Now (How Many Times)" Released: July 17, 2012; 3. "One Drop" Released: 2013; 4. "Don't Deserve You" Released: 2014; 5. "Lord I'm Ready Now" Released: 2014

Need You Now is the sixth studio album by American singer-songwriter Plumb released on February 26, 2013. The album was preceded by the singles "Drifting", with Dan Haseltine of Jars of Clay making a guest appearance, and "Need You Now (How Many Times)". A deluxe edition of the album was released on September 16, 2014, with six additional tracks.

== Background ==
The album was originally titled Faster Than a Bullet. On December 20, 2012, she stated she was renaming her upcoming album to Need You Now in honor of the victims of the Sandy Hook Elementary School shooting.

== Music ==
=== Songs ===
"Drifting" was released as the lead single on August 30, 2011, and charted on five different minor charts. The song was co-written by Matt Bronleewe of Jars of Clay who also produced Plumb's debut, self-titled album. Dan Haseltine, also of Jars of Clay, was featured on the song. Plumb uploaded a lyric video to her YouTube channel the same day of the official release of the single.

"Need You Now (How Many Times)" was released on July 17, 2012, and peaked at No. 3 on the Billboard Christian Songs chart.

On February 5, 2013, the single "One Drop" was released on iTunes. Plumb also uploaded a music video she made in collaboration with Blood:Water Mission for the song.

== Reception ==
=== Commercial ===
The album was the No. 56 and No. 2 album on the Billboard 200 and the Christian Albums charts respectively, selling 10,000 copies for the week of March 16, 2013. The album has sold 69,000 copies in the US as of April 2015.

=== Critical ===
Professional ratings
Review scores
Source	Rating
About.com	4.5/5 stars
CCM Magazine	4/5 stars
Christian Music Zine	4.5/5 stars
CM Addict	4.5/5 stars
Cross Rhythms	10/10 squares
Indie Vision Music	4/5 stars
Jesus Freak Hideout	4/5 stars
Louder Than the Music	4/5 stars
New Release Tuesday	4.5/5 stars 5/5 stars
The Phantom Tollbooth	4/5 stars

Plumb's Need You Now has only received positive reviews from the critics, and has achieved "universal acclaim" by the eleven reviews, so far. The album got one lone five-star perfect rating from Kevin Davis of New Release Tuesday. Davis wrote that "Plumb presents yet again another brilliant studio collection." Davis closed with "Need You Now has been one of my favorite albums to savor in many years, as the combination of Tiffany Arbuckle-Lee's incredible vocal range and her compelling and relevant lyrics have never been more perfectly combined than with this stellar and flawless masterpiece. Plumb's longtime producer Matt Bronleewe perfectly describes her unique sound as 'raw, lyrically introspective vocals floating across an epic soundscape.' Every Plumb album is an immersion into her life. Each is unique, tied to the emotions and circumstances that inspired it, and yet each is timeless, identifiable as the outpouring of a singular artistic vision. Every song on this album is excellent, and Need You Now is the album of the year." In addition, the album got a perfect ten-star rating from Tony Cummings of Cross Rhythms, who praised her for being "one of the finest singer/songwriters in Christendom, possessing a beautiful soprano voice which is both wistfully poignant and passionately expressive. In recent years Plumb has been discovered by the EDM community and no doubt in the coming months there will be tracks from this stunning set remixed to feature in the US Billboard Hot Dance Club Play charts. But above all it is Tiffany the lyricist who keeps the listener coming back to these honest and eloquent songs."

Need You Now got four-and-a-half-star-out-of-five ratings from the following publications: About.com, Christian Music Zine, CM Addict and Jonathan Francesco of New Release Tuesday. Kim Jones of About.com highlighted that "Fusing styles, sounds and sections of who she is is what Plumb does best in Need You Now. She is not a lady to be pigeonholed into one category of anything and this release shows you a more complete picture of the woman behind the music." Christian Music Zine's Joshua Andre evoked that "The theme of the album is hope and about how we can come to God when we feel like we need to; and on this subject alone, listening to this album is a must for everyone, even more- it is a necessity...let's just enjoy Need You Now" Andrew Funderburk of CM Addict alluded to how "despite there being hope for all, Need You Now, as a whole, is perfectly honest about being human...With her latest selections, Plumb returns more to her original roots of music and that edgy rock sound causes one to assess the grittiness of life and still find meaning in it. That combined with the edginess of this project etches the tunes in the mind so much more." Funderburk finished with noting that "This album is a cry. A cry for healing and restoration in brokenness. A cry for hope in the midst of chaos. Need You Now reveals the rawness of our daily life, especially concerning the relational aspects. In the middle of the searing pain, Need You Now also reveals there is a Healing Hope greater than we could ever imagine. And as we move closer to this Hope, we move closer to Love... and closer to being wholly restored." New Release Tuesday's Jonathan Francesco proclaimed that "Plumb's really knocked this out of the park. The music is packed with a myriad of different emotions and Plumb sells all of it with passionate vocals. The music is top-notch and the lyrics honest. There's really little more you could ask for in music. The sound's very accessible. I'd bet this album could easily appeal to fans of top-selling mainstream pop, while still being more than pleasing to those of us who like some lyrical meat in our music. Start to finish, this latest album from Plumb is pretty darn amazing."

The four-star-out-of-five ratings come in for Need You Now from the following publications: CCM Magazine, Indie Vision Music, Jesus Freak Hideout's Jen Rose and Alex "Tincan" Caldwell, Louder Than the Music, The Phantom Tollbooth. Matt Conner of CCM Magazine evoked that "Need You Now is packed with emotionally driven rock tunes that have taken her to the top of the charts time after time. 'Need You Now' and 'Invisible' are the likely candidates for an immediate response, but the whole album is a worthy listen." Indie Vision Music's Jonathan Andre noted that "this poignant collection of 12 songs (plus an added remix) present to the listener a place where emotion, struggles, hope, fear, peace, comfort and calamity all collide as Plumb invites us into a moment of vulnerability and surrender- asking the Lord to be our comfort in the trials, even if or when we can't even see or feel His presence (especially then!)." In addition, Andre vowed that "Need You Now matches anticipation and adds a little extra as Tiffany reveals what I think is her most personal album to date. With all these songs incorporating a longing to look for the eternal amongst the transient and realise that what we're searching for only God can give, this album is a must for anyone who loves her previous work, or those who love great pop music from similar artists like Jars of Clay and Britt Nicole. Carrying along the vein of her chart-topping songs like 'Cut', 'Real', 'Stranded' and 'In My Arms'; 'Need You Now' and the rest of the songs on this album are going to be a fan favourite amongst many who have witnessed this woman of God from Indiana thrive in her role of music artist. One of the most ingenious and standout albums of the year". Jen Rose of Jesus Freak Hideout noted how the album "has arrived as a return to form, an eclectic mix of hooky pop and rock songs that present a multi-faceted portrait of an accomplished artist and a regular woman with a story to tell." Rose foresaw that "Though it might seem all over the place on first listen, it turns out that this record is a portrayal of life's complexity, all wrapped in a variety of musical styles, a powerful yet vulnerable voice, and emotional and lyrical honesty. Those who have been waiting for more of what Plumb does best will find a lot to love in Need You Now, as it shows off the many sides of Tiffany Lee and makes another strong entry in her career's beautiful history." Jesus Freak Hideout's Alex "Tincan" Caldwell surmised that "Plumb's long delayed Need You Now gives new life to the old adage that 'some things are worth waiting for'." Finally, Caldwell called Need You Now "one of the best releases of the year." Louder Than the Music's Jono Davies evoked how "This album, to be fair, has everything. The only slight fault I can see is the fact that some songs don't enable the album to flow very easily from one song to another. But it does have a little bit of everything, kind of like a musical mixed fruit salad." At The Phantom Tollbooth, Derek Walker noted that "there may be little new here, but [...] colourful and powerful as ever", and felt "this work is among Lee's best."

A four-and-a-half-star-out-of-five rating came in for the deluxe edition from John DiBiase of Jesus Freak Hideout. He was thankful that deluxe editions like this were released and that the four new songs fit the album's theme well and actually enhanced the listener's experience, and overlooks the mandatory "radio remix" thrown into the bonus tracks.

== Track listing ==
All tracks are written by Tiffany Arbuckle-Lee and Matt Bronleewe except where noted.

Standard edition
No.	Title	Writer(s)	Length
1.	"Invisible"	Arbuckle-Lee; Matt Bronleewe; Joy Williams	3:36
2.	"Drifting" (with Dan Haseltine)	Arbuckle-Lee; Bronleewe; Dan Haseltine	3:11
3.	"Beautiful"		4:32
4.	"One Drop"		3:52
5.	"I Want You Here"		5:12
6.	"Say Your Name"	Arbuckle-Lee; Bronleewe; Tami Hinish; Luke Sheets	3:20
7.	"Unlovable"	Arbuckle-Lee; Ben Glover; Seth Jones	3:53
8.	"Need You Now (How Many Times)"	Arbuckle-Lee; Sheets; Christa Wells	4:12
9.	"Chocolate and Ice Cream"		3:19
10.	"Don't Deserve You"		4:08
11.	"Cage"		3:16
12.	"At Arms Length"		5:01
13.	"I Don't Deserve You" (with Paul van Dyk)	Arbuckle-Lee; Bronleewe; Paul van Dyk	3:32
Total length:			51:33

2014 Deluxe edition
No.	Title	Writer(s)	Length
12.	"At Arms Length"		5:01
13.	"Starting Over"	Arbuckle-Lee; Sam Tinnesz; Joe Henderson; Keith Smith	3:11
14.	"Fall Back In"	Arbuckle-Lee; Luke Sheets; Matt Bronleewe	3:42
15.	"Faithful"	Arbuckle-Lee; Amy Perry; Brian Hitt	4:17
16.	"Lord I'm Ready Now"	Arbuckle-Lee; Luke Sheets	3:33
17.	"Don't Deserve You" (Radio Mix)		3:51
18.	"Need You Now (How Many Times)" (Worship Version)	Arbuckle-Lee; Luke Sheets; Christa Wells	5:12
Total length:			71:37

== Personnel ==
- Plumb – vocals
- Matt Bronleewe – all instruments, programming
- Matt Stanfield – additional programming
- Chris Carmichael – string arrangements and performer
- Dan Haseltine – vocals (2)

=== Production ===
- Chris Bradstreet – executive producer, management
- Jeremy Lee – executive producer
- Bryan Stewart – executive producer, A&R
- Matt Bronleewe – producer (1–12), engineer (1–12), vocal producer (13), vocal recording (13), Bonus Tracks (13–18)
- Paul van Dyk – producer (13)
- Stephen Leiweke – additional engineer
- Ainslie Grosser – mixing
- John DeNosky – editing at Toybox Studios (Brentwood, Tennessee)
- Bill Whittington – additional editing
- Tom Coyne – mastering at Sterling Sound (New York, NY)
- Lani Crump – project coordinator
- Neltner Creative – design
- 12South Music – design
- Street Talk Media – management

== Charts ==
Chart (2013)	Peak position
US Billboard 200	56
US Top Christian Albums (Billboard)	2
