= Plumb (singer) =

Contemporary Christian singer, songwriter and author

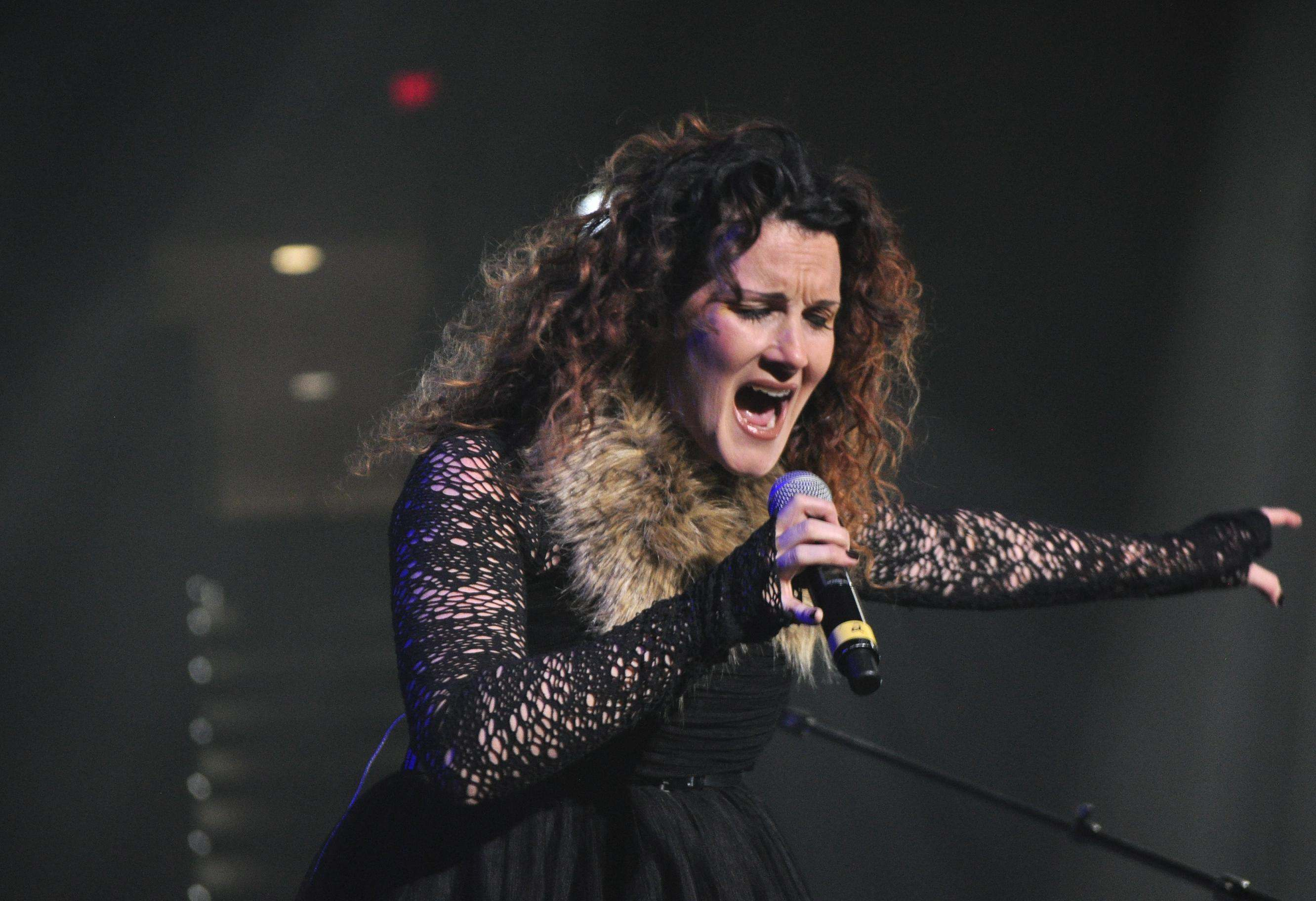
- Plumb performing in 2014

Background information
- Born: Tiffany Arbuckle; March 9, 1975 (age 51)
- Origin: Indianapolis, Indiana, U.S.
- Genres: Alternative rock; Christian rock; CCM; electronic; pop
- Years active: 1997–present
- Labels: Warner/Essential; Curb; Plumb Music
- Website: www.plumbmusic.net

Tiffany Arbuckle Lee, better known by her stage name Plumb, is an American singer-songwriter and author. Plumb has sold more than 500,000 albums and over two million singles worldwide, co-penned songs for numerous other artists, including Michelle Branch, Mandisa, Mandy Moore, Jaci Velasquez, and Natalie Grant, and had music placed in many films and television shows. Originally signed as a contemporary Christian music recording artist in 1997, Plumb is now known as well as or better in alternative rock and EDM, and for the use of her music in film and television than she is in the contemporary Christian music market.

== Career ==
Tiffany Arbuckle was born in Indianapolis but grew up in Atlanta, singing in church and school. She moved to Nashville one week before her 21st birthday, where she now resides, and worked as a background singer for a number of artists, including Bill Gaither and Amy Grant.

Plumb was originally formed in 1997 as a five-piece band that consisted of Arbuckle on vocals, Joe Porter on drums, Matt Stanfield on keyboards, J.J. Plasencio on bass guitar and Stephen Leiweke on guitar, with name, Plumb, coming from the Suzanne Vega song "My Favorite Plum". Following Silvertone Records affiliate Essential Records mainstream alternative radio success with its debut artist Jars of Clay in 1995, the label signed Plumb as its second artist. When Arbuckle was urged to write, she turned to Matt Bronleewe—an original member of Jars of Clay who happened to be her next-door neighbor—and the two hit it off. The debut album, Plumb, was released in 1997. Plumb has said subsequently that the addition of the letter "B" to the end was the idea of her producer Matt Bronleewe and, in her mind, also represents Bronleewe's important contribution to her sound.

In 1999, Plumb released a second studio album, Candycoatedwaterdrops, which won the 2000 Gospel Music Association Dove Award for "Modern Rock Album of the Year". Three tracks from it were later covered by other artists; "Stranded" and "Here with Me" by Jennifer Paige and, in 2001, "Damaged" by Plummet. Though the album won the DOVE Award for Best Modern Rock Album in 2000, and saw strong radio success with the single "God-Shaped Hole", the subject matter and approach of much of Plumb's music was often considered too dark and taboo for the mainstream Christian marketplace. Plumb's tendency to write songs about deeply personal issues, such as international hit "Cut" which addressed cutting, and "Damaged" which addressed a girl coping with being molested as a child, led to more enthusiastic reception by fans of alternative and dance music. Fueling the break from contemporary Christian music, "Cut" was also used prominently during a pivotal scene in the storyline of The Vampire Diaries in the 10th episode of season 1, "The Turning Point". Later in 1999, all band members left the band, and since that time Plumb became a solo project of Tiffany Arbuckle.

Plumb considered leaving the music industry after the 2000 album, but changed her mind after receiving a note from a fan a few hours before what she thought to be her final concert. The letter was about her song "Damaged" about a girl coping with being molested as a child. The note said "Whatever you do, I just want you to never forget that you have changed someone's life," which inspired Plumb to remain in the music industry. She signed to Curb Records in 2003, releasing the album Beautiful Lumps of Coal on March 25, 2003. The lead single, "Real", peaked at No. 41 on the UK Singles Chart. Her next album, Chaotic Resolve, entered the Billboard 200 album chart at No. 177 on March 9, 2006. "Better" reached No. 1 on the U.S. Christian airplay chart. The Bronleewe & Bose remix of her follow-up "Cut", hit No. 1 on SiriusXM's dance hits channel BPM, and No. 5 on Billboard's Hot Dance Club Songs chart.

Shortly after the birth of her second child, Plumb recorded her fifth album, Blink, as a collection of lullaby inspired songs. It was released on October 9, 2007, immediately becoming one of her best selling and most enduring albums to date. Lead single "In My Arms" was used in conjunction with key plot narratives for both Vampire Diaries and One Tree Hill, and became Plumb's biggest international hit to date, selling close to half a million singles in both the United States and Russia. "In My Arms" received remixes by Kaskade, Scotty K, Bronleewe & Bose, Gomi, and Bimbo Jones, with the latter reaching the No. 3 spot on the Billboard Dance chart.

On May 19, 2009, Curb Records announced that it would release a career-spanning greatest hits album, Beautiful History, which was released later in the year and included several new songs. The first single from Beautiful History, "Hang On", reached No. 1 on the Billboard Hot Dance Club Play chart in 2009 and reached the top spot on Billboard's Hot Dance Airplay chart in 2010.

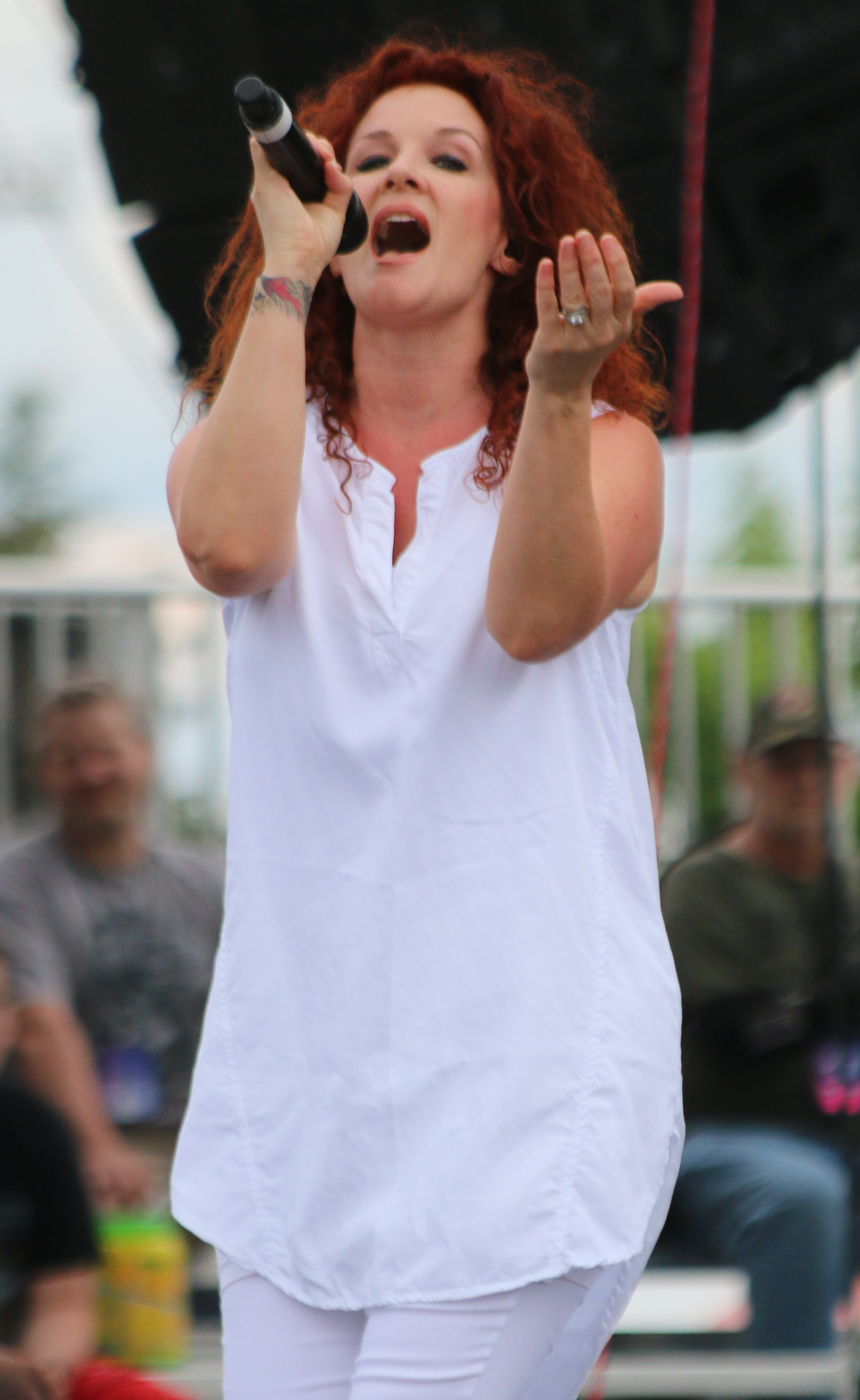
Plumb performing at Lifest 2017

Plumb returned to the studio in 2010 with longtime producer and co-writer Matt Bronleewe to begin work on what would become her 6th studio album, while also changing management and signing with alternative boutique firm Street Talk Media. The debut single from the project, "Drifting", a co-penned duet with longtime friend Dan Haseltine (of Jars of Clay), spread quickly across Christian rock radio. The second single, "Need You Now (How Many Times)", went to contemporary Christian music radio in early 2012 and has become Plumb's most successful single to date in that market, rising to number to No. 1 on multiple radio and iTunes charts in both the United States and Canada by year's end. The single has remained in regular rotation nationwide for well over a year, selling close to 300,000 singles on iTunes to date, and is BDS certified at over 100,000 radio spins. The album Need You Now was released worldwide in February 2013, charting at a career-best No. 56 on the Billboard 200 chart and No. 2 on Christian album charts. The album received five Dove Award nominations including Song of the Year and Contemporary/Pop Album of the Year. With her children now all at least grade school age, and with the massive success of Need You Now, 2012 and 2013 saw the most aggressive touring of her entire career, playing major festivals throughout 2012 and 2013, embarking on her first and largely sold-out headlining tour in the fall of 2013, and joining the massive Winterjam arena tour for November 2013–14.

Plumb released her seventh studio album, Exhale, on May 4, 2015.

Plumb left Curb Records in early 2017 to form her own label, Plumb Music, and released her first single "God Help Me" in July 2017. The song was one of six tracks included on the EP God Help Me in late 2017. She followed it up with the album Beautifully Broken in June 2018 on Centricity Music.

Following the No. 1 chart successes of "In My Arms", "Hang On", and "Cut", Plumb has been increasingly sought after in the dance and electronic world. In 2011, she collaborated with trance DJ Paul Van Dyk on "I Don't Deserve You", playing several shows with Van Dyk, and filming a music video together in middle Tennessee. Plumb's original version and recording of the song would be included on her sixth studio album, Need You Now, and featured in episode 5x02 of Vampire Diaries.

== Personal life ==
Plumb has three children with her ex-husband, Jeremy Lee.

She is single per her Facebook post, saying "My faith and my children. They are everything to me. I never imagined being a single mom to them. I never imagined being single at all after they came along. I had an image in my head that the man I was married to and I growing old together and dying together like that scene in The Notebook. I never imagined being the priest in my home. By myself. Things don't always turn out the way we plan and it has taken me a very long almost 34 months now of learning that."

== Discography ==
- Plumb (1997)
- candycoatedwaterdrops (1999)
- Beautiful Lumps of Coal (2003)
- Chaotic Resolve (2006)
- Blink (2007)
- Need You Now (2013)
- Exhale (2015)
- Beautifully Broken (2018)
- It's Christmastime (2024)
