= I Will Wait (disambiguation) =

"I Will Wait" is a song by Mumford & Sons from the album Babel.

I Will Wait may also refer to:

- "I Will Wait" (Nick Carter song), 2015
- "I Will Wait" (Hootie & the Blowfish song), 1998
- "I Will Wait" (Isa song), 2016
- "I, Will Wait", a song by Pere Ubu from the 1978 album Dub Housing

== See also ==
- I'll Wait (disambiguation)
- I'll Wait for You (disambiguation)
