= All American (album) =

Studio album by Nick Carter
- Released: November 25, 2015
- Recorded: January–June 2015
- Genres: Pop, pop rock, pop punk
- Length: 34:33
- Labels: Kaotic, Inc
- Producer: Dan Muckala

Nick Carter chronology
Nick & Knight (2014)	All American (2015)

Singles from All American
- 1. "I Will Wait" Released: September 12, 2015; 2. "Nothing's Gonna Change My Love for You" Released: February 3, 2016 (Japan only); 3. "19 in 99" Released: February 5, 2016

All American is the third solo album released in 2015 by Backstreet Boys member Nick Carter. The album was released on November 25, 2015, on his own record label, Kaotic, Inc. This is his first solo album since I'm Taking Off, which was released four years earlier.

== Background ==
In January 2015, Carter let fans know he was working on another solo album that would be titled "All American". On September 22, 2015, he released the lead single, I Will Wait, which he said was inspired by Ed Sheeran's songwriting. Carter also has a track featuring Canadian singer Avril Lavigne, titled "Get Over Me". All American was released on November 25, 2015, a day after the Dancing with the Stars finale, where he was one of the four finalists.

== Musical style ==
The musical style of the album combines pop, rock and pop punk, and features some rock music instruments such as drum and rock guitar. The song "Cherry Pie" has the throwback type feel like that of Mark Ronson. Some songs have a guitar sound of pop punk music, such as "19 in 99", "Tijuana", "All American" and "Left for Dead". The songs "California", "Second Wind", "Sweet" and "In Over My Head" have more of a dance-pop and teen pop sound while "Get Over Me" has a pop-punk and pop rock sound. "I Will Wait" is an emotional ballad inspired by Ed Sheeran, with a clear acoustic guitar sound.

I'm very inspired by rock and pop music, and have those in me, and have done albums like that in the past, so it's going to have that. But it also has some rhythm, it has some soul for sure. I feel like I'm definitely coming into my own as an artist. But it just touches on all sorts of different styles and feels, so when you listen to the album from top to bottom, you know it's taking you on a ride. Like a musical. Like a movie, or something.

— Nick Carter, I Heart Radio

== Singles ==
"I Will Wait" is the first single of the album, released on September 12, 2015, on iTunes, and September 22 on Vevo. The song climbed to No. 1 on the Billboard Trending 140 Chart. On September 24, Carter performed the song on the finale of Dancing with the Stars.

On February 3, 2016, "Nothing's Gonna Change My Love for You" was released only in Japan, set as the promotional single and bonus track of the All American Japanese standard edition. Carter duets with Japanese singer Nissy on this song, which was originally recorded by American musician George Benson, with lyrics by Michael Masser and Gerry Goffin. The song entered the Billboard Japan Hot 100 at No. 86. However, it debuted at No. 12 on the Japanese iTunes Weekly Chart.

"19 in 99" was released as the second official international single of the album. Its music video was released on February 5, 2016 on Vevo and YouTube, and was directed by Kevin Estrada. Bandmate AJ McLean makes a cameo appearance in the video.

== Track listing ==
All songs produced by Dan Muckala.

All American track listing
No.	Title	Writer(s)	Length
1.	"19 in 99"	Nick Carter, Bryan Shackle, Thomas Kipp Williams, Dan Muckala	3:25
2.	"Get Over Me" (featuring Avril Lavigne)	Carter, Shackle, Williams, Muckala	3:29
3.	"California"	Carter, Shackle, Williams, Muckala	2:59
4.	"Second Wind"	Carter, Natasha Bedingfield, Williams, Muckala	3:30
5.	"Swet"	Carter, Shackle, Williams, Muckala	2:42
6.	"Cherry Pie"	Carter, Shackle, Williams, Muckala	3:07
7.	"Tijuana"	Carter, Shackle, Williams, Muckala	3:03
8.	"All American"	Carter, Shackle, Williams, Muckala	2:53
9.	"Man on the Moon"	Carter, Williams, Muckala	2:48
10.	"Horoscope"	Carter, Shackle, Williams, Muckala	3:13
11.	"I Will Wait"	Carter, Shackle, Williams, Muckala	3:24
Total length:			34:33

Japanese standard edition bonus tracks
No.	Title	Writer(s)	Length
12.	"Left for Dead"	Bryan Shackle, Matt Mahaffey	3:01
13.	"In Over My Head"	Carter, Nicholas "Ras" Furlong, Andy Goldstein, Allen Lewis, Graham Stone	3:01
14.	"Nothing's Gonna Change My Love for You" (duet with Nissy)	Michael Masser, Gerry Goffin	4:28
Total length:			45:03

Japanese deluxe edition bonus DVD
No.	Title	Notes	Length
15.	"I Will Wait" (music video)	Video
16.	"19 in 99" (music video/Japanese version)	Video
17.	"All American: Behind the Scenes of the Recording"	Video

== Charts ==
Chart performance for All American
Chart (2016)	Peak position
Canadian Albums (Billboard)	99
Japanese Albums (Oricon)	27

== Release history ==
In the US, the physical CD's were only available on his official website. The album is also available digitally on Amazon, iTunes, and Spotify worldwide.

Release history and formats for All American
Country	Date	Format	Label
United States	November 25, 2015	Digital download	Kaotic, Inc.
Japan	February 10, 2016	CD; digital download	Universal Music Japan
Canada	March 10, 2016	CD; digital download	Kaotic, Inc.

== Tour ==
All American Tour
- Tour by Nick Carter
- Associated album: All American
- Start date: February 24, 2016
- End date: March 26, 2016
- Legs: 1
- No. of shows: 22 in North America

To support this album, Carter went on a North American tour that began in February 2016. The tour included 22 cities, starting in Sacramento, California and ending in Nashville, Tennessee.

=== Opening act and guests ===
American singer Riley Biederer was announced to be the opening act of the entire All American Tour. On February 25, which was the second show held in Beverly Hills, bandmate AJ McLean made an appearance and sang a duet with Carter on the song "The Call". Those in the audience included Sharna Burgess, Rochelle McLean, Jeff Timmons and wife Lauren Kitt. American actress Kyla Kenedy attended the Dallas concert on March 4. During the show in New York, Carter brought out a surprise guest, bandmate Brian Littrell for singing two Backstreet Boys songs; "I Want It That Way" and "Show Me the Meaning of Being Lonely".

=== Setlist ===
This setlist was received from the February 24, 2016 concert at Ace of Spades in Sacramento. Carter also covered some songs by other artists during concerts, such as "Wonderwall" by Oasis, "Jesse's Girl" by Rick Springfield, "Californication" by Red Hot Chili Peppers, "Free Fallin'" by Tom Petty, "Buddy Holly" by Weezer and "In the Air Tonight" by Phil Collins. During the song "The Call", Carter performed dance moves that he learned from Dancing with the Stars, where he was one of the contestants.

Show intro

1. "Blow Your Mind"
2. "I'm Taking Off"
3. "Horoscope"
4. "All American" (contains elements of "Jesse's Girl")
5. "As Long as You Love Me"
6. "One More Time"
7. "Just Want You to Know"

Unplugged

8. "I Want It That Way"
9. "Show Me the Meaning of Being Lonely"
10. "Madeleine"
11. "I Will Wait"
12. "Shape of My Heart"
13. "Second Wind"

Full band rock show

14. "Burning Up"
15. "Swet"
16. "Larger than Life"
17. "The Call"
18. "Falling Down"(contains elements of "In the Air Tonight")
19. "19 in 99"
20. "Get Over Me"

Encore

21. "Everybody (Backstreet's Back)"
22. "I Got You"
- "Shape of My Heart" was later replaced by "Wonderwall".

=== Tour dates ===
Date	City	Country	Venue
North America
February 24, 2016	Sacramento	United States	Ace of Spades
February 25, 2016	Beverly Hills	United States	Saban Theatre
February 26, 2016	Anaheim	United States	House of Blues
February 27, 2016	Solana Beach	United States	Belly Up Tavern
February 29, 2016	Phoenix	United States	Crescent Ballroom
March 1, 2016	Tucson	United States	Rialto Theatre
March 4, 2016	Dallas	United States	South Side Ballroom
March 5, 2016	Houston	United States	Warehouse Live
March 6, 2016	New Orleans	United States	House of Blues
March 9, 2016	Raleigh	United States	The Ritz
March 10, 2016	Baltimore	United States	Sound Stage Baltimore
March 11, 2016	Freehold	United States	iPlay America
March 12, 2016	New York	United States	PlayStation Theater
March 13, 2016	Boston	United States	House of Blues
March 16, 2016	Montreal	Canada	Métropolis
March 17, 2016	Toronto	Canada	Phoenix Concert Theatre
March 18, 2016	Grand Rapids	United States	The Intersection
March 19, 2016	Chicago	United States	House of Blues
March 20, 2016	Minneapolis	United States	Skyway Theatre
March 23, 2016	Kansas City	United States	Uptown Theater
March 24, 2016	St. Louis	United States	The Ready Room
March 26, 2016	Nashville	United States	City Winery
