= AJ McLean =

American singer, member of Backstreet Boys (born 1978)

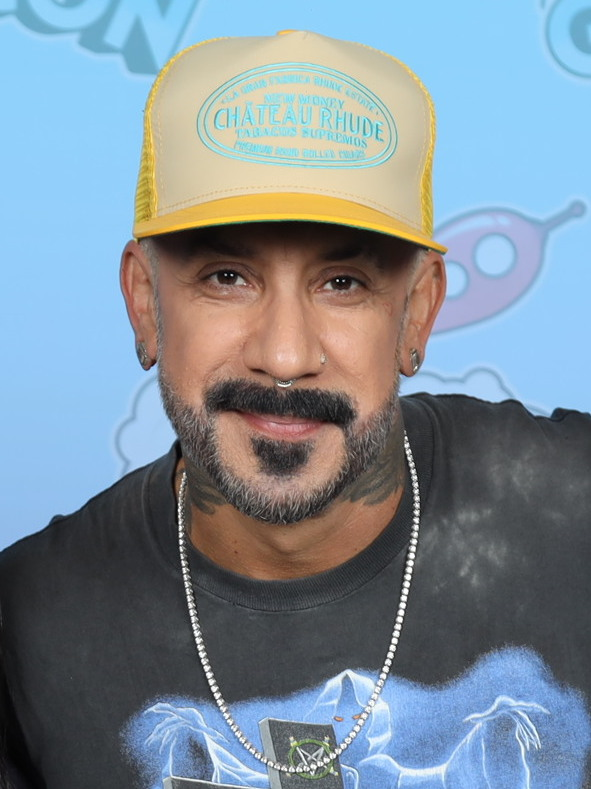
- McLean at GalaxyCon Raleigh in 2023
- Born: Alexander James McLean; January 9, 1978 (age 48); West Palm Beach, Florida, U.S.
- Other names: Johnny No Name; Bone
- Occupation: Singer
- Years active: 1986–present
- Agent: Johnny Wright
- Spouse: Rochelle Karidis (m. 2011; sep. 2023)
- Children: 2
- Musical career
- Genres: Pop; R&B; pop rock; country pop
- Labels: Jive; Avex; Podwall
- Member of: Backstreet Boys
- Formerly of: NKOTBSB
- Website: ajmclean.com

Signature
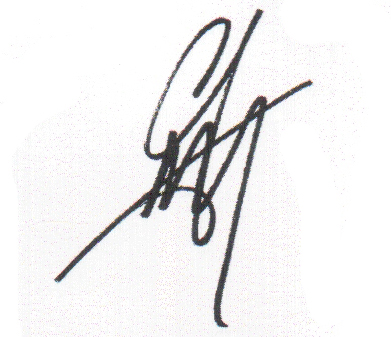

Alexander James McLean (born January 9, 1978) is an American singer. He is a founding member of the pop vocal group Backstreet Boys.

== Early life ==
McLean was born on January 9, 1978, in West Palm Beach, Florida, to Denise (née Fernandez, now Solis), a hospital worker, author and motivation coach, and Robert Blue "Bob" McLean, a musician. Denise is of Cuban-Puerto Rican and German ancestry and Bob is of Scots-Irish and English descent. A DNA test described his genetic ancestry as North, West and East European, North African, Nigerian and Ashkenazi Jewish. He is an only child. He was raised by his mother and grandparents as his parents divorced when he was two years old. He rarely saw his father but reunited with him in 1997. They have since kept in regular contact following their seventeen-year estrangement.

== Career ==
=== Early career ===
He discovered his love for performing and began pursuing a career in acting, dancing, and singing. When he was four, McLean began focusing on his love of dance. His mother signed him up for two hours of dance lessons every day. He took ballet for four years, jazz, tap, hip hop, rhythm tap, rhythm hip-hop, contemporary, ballroom, salsa, merengue, and gymnastics. His mother got him into modeling when he was around five years old, and he was featured in J.C. Penney catalogs and runways. Aside from that, he took up fencing. His grandmother, who was like a second mother to him, taught him piano and took him to auditions while he was growing up. At age six, McLean was part of a school play, Snow White and the Seven Dwarfs, in which he played Dopey, at Unity of Delray Beach church and school. He also appeared in more traditional musicals such as The Nutcracker, The King and I, and Fiddler on the Roof before the age of 11. By age 12, he had performed in 27 classic school plays.

In addition to singing and acting, he was a serious dance student learning everything from jazz to ballet to hip hop. He stated in interviews that "Dancing was really my thing in the early days. I wanted to be a dancer way above an actor or a singer." When he was 12, he started his first dance troupe and would go to dance competitions, which was a valuable experience even though they didn't win.

In January 1986, at eight years old, McLean acted in his first role as Little Mike in the 1986 film, Truth or Dare?. In 1990, McLean, his mother, and grandparents moved to Kissimmee, Florida to pursue his acting and singing career. For four years, he attended a private acting school, the Florida Academy of Dramatic Arts, acted in the drama club and small plays, and modeled periodically. In 1991, McLean landed a role in the Nickelodeon comedy series Hi Honey, I'm Home! as Skunk. However, after the pilot, he was cut from the show due to being too tall, and Eric Kushnick was cast instead.

In 1989, at age 11, he saw an ad in the newspaper for a Latin festival. Since his grandfather had Latin roots, he decided to audition. He won first place and a $1,000 prize. The festival's producer hired him to perform a 45-minute one-person show and did a puppet show, showcasing his singing, acting, and dancing. At the Latin festival, he met a young 16-year-old Howie Dorough through a mutual vocal coach.

In junior high, McLean won a part in Nickelodeon's series Welcome Freshmen, which began his ongoing work relationship with Nickelodeon and the Disney Channel. He also appeared on the Nickelodeon show Guts and a Muppets commercial. He saw Dorough and Nick Carter at the Nickelodeon tryouts.

Due to his love of performing and not participating in the same sports as his peers, he was bullied, called names, and given a hard time. He described himself at this young age as a weirdo and "wacky." He remarked that being made fun of had been very upsetting for him, but he felt it stemmed from others' jealousy of his talents and the subsequent attention that gave him.

=== Backstreet Boys ===
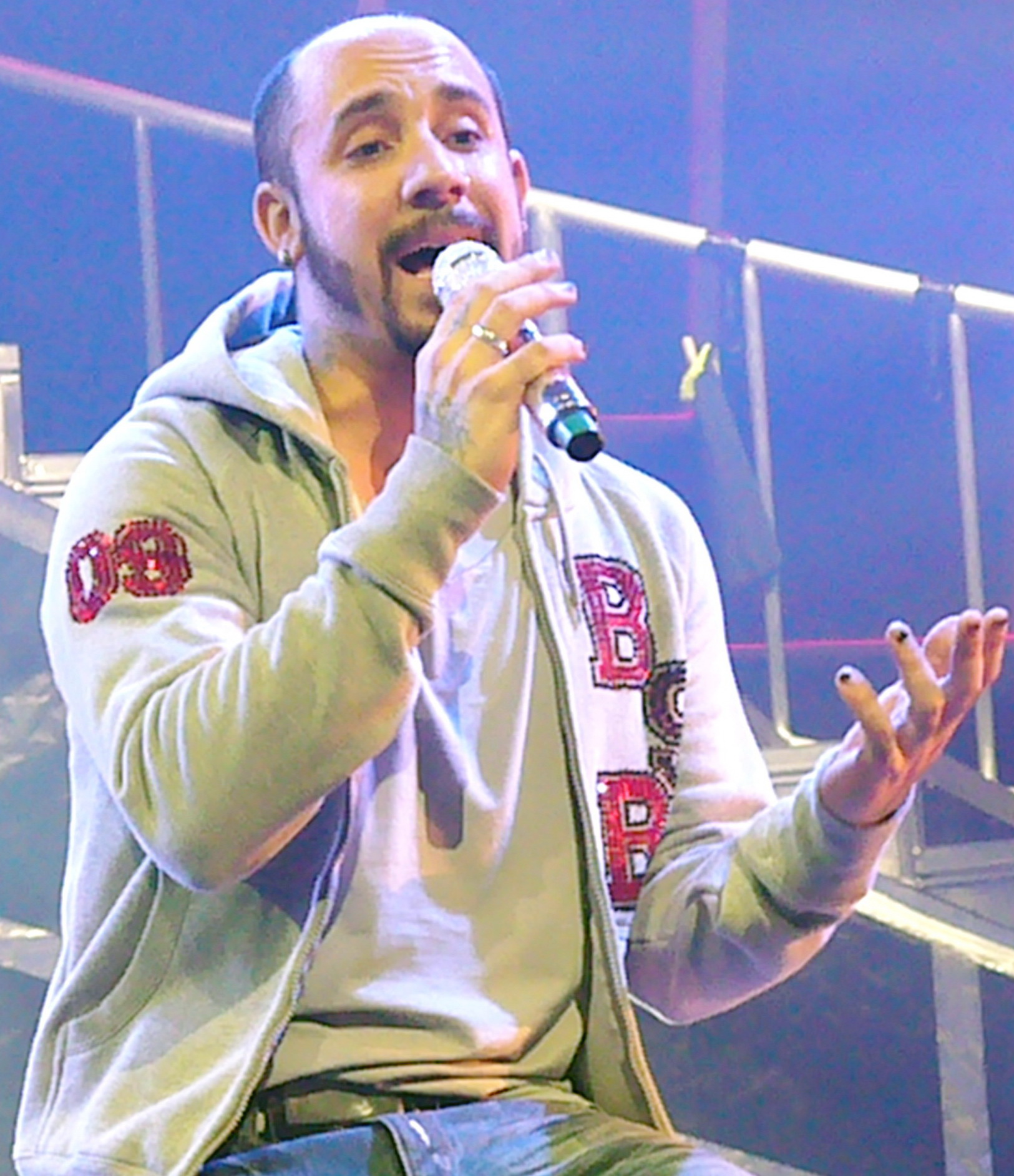
McLean performing in 2009

In March 1992, an ad was placed in a local newspaper seeking young men aged 16-19 for an audition with a new music group. Despite being 14, he auditioned for the group. By April 1992, McLean was officially the group's first member to join the newly formed Backstreet Boys. After six months at Osceola High School, he finished the remaining three years of high school through correspondence courses with a tutor on the road after joining the Backstreet Boys. McLean, Nick Carter, Howie Dorough, Kevin Richardson, and Richardson's cousin Brian Littrell formed the vocal group Backstreet Boys in 1993. The group enjoyed extensive commercial success throughout the late 1990s and early 2000s.

=== Solo ventures ===
==== Johnny No Name (2000) ====
McLean created a character named "Johnny No Name" as his alter ego. He uses this as his name when not performing with other members of the Backstreet Boys. The character has similarities to McLean; for instance, both had single mothers and lived with their grandparents from a young age. There are also differences – Johnny has been to prison, whereas McLean has not. McLean has occasionally performed as Johnny No Name in rock/metal clubs around New York. He established the JNN Foundation to fund diabetes research and other causes, such as keeping music programs in schools. McLean also performed a nine-city tour to support VH1 Save the Music as Johnny No Name. A source said he would release a solo album under the name Johnny No Name, but it never happened.

McLean's alter ego was originally named Johnny Suede. This shared a name with a character played by Brad Pitt in a film of the same name, and when the film's movie studio Miramax threatened to sue McLean, he changed the name to Johnny No Name.

==== Have It All (2010) ====
It was not until March 2008 that McLean finally performed his first two solo shows at the Anaheim House of Blues and The Roxy in Los Angeles. The show consisted of his solo material and a solo version of the Backstreet Boys hit, "Incomplete." The solo tour continued through Europe in May and June, parallel to the Backstreet Boys tour. His solo album Have It All was released on January 20, 2010. On the Backstreet Boys cruise in December 2010, it was said that the US version would be released on February 8, 2011, but it has not been released since then. While creating his solo project, McLean worked with the OneRepublic vocalist Ryan Tedder, producers Dan Muckala and Kristian Lundin, as well as former NSYNC member JC Chasez. The album was a mix of pop, rock, and some r&b. The first and only single from the album, "Teenage Wildlife," was co-written by Chasez. The album featured his co-written ten songs, including a personal song about his father, "Sincerely Yours." In 2011, McLean said he would release the album in the US in 2012, featuring songs from his first solo album, but he eventually scrapped the idea.

In June 2012, McLean was working on a second solo original album. On July 23, 2012, he posted two new songs on Socialcam: "Peach" and "P.L.A.R.S." The album was announced for release in 2012, but it was pushed back.

Around early 2015, McLean said he was working on a new solo album with Jordan Omley of The Jam, who worked on several Backstreet Boys songs on the albums This Is Us and In A World Like This. The first single, "Live Together," was named for a charitable foundation started by McLean and Omley; a music video was filmed to help raise money for Marshall Fundamental Secondary School in Pasadena, California, which had had its musical instruments stolen. McLean, along with singers Becky G, Omley, and Blake Lewis, visited the school, and some even performed there. "Live Together" premiered on People.com on May 12, 2015, and the video was released on October 5, 2015. Meanwhile, the album experienced delays, partly due to McLean recording new tracks and the Backstreet Boys' preparation and promotion for their 2017 Las Vegas residency Backstreet Boys: Larger Than Life.

==== Collaborations (2013) ====
On May 22, 2013, a Finnish rapper Redrama released a single, "Clouds," featuring McLean. It peaked at No. 4 on the singles chart in Finland.

==== Naked (2016) ====
A second solo album titled Naked was scheduled for release in September 2016, but it was delayed. "Live Together" was released as the lead single on September 4, 2015, on iTunes.

==== Singles (2018–2022) ====
On April 15, 2018, at the 53rd annual Academy of Country Music Awards, during an interview with Billboard, McLean discussed his plans to "disrupt country music" for his next solo project. He also said that the Backstreet Boys' collaboration on Florida Georgia Line's "God, Your Mama, and Me" inspired him to make a country album. On June 4, 2018, McLean released the single "Back Porch Bottle Service" from an upcoming album. McLean continued his foray into country-pop releasing the ballad "Boy and a Man" in March 2019 as a single from an upcoming album Long Road. The video was directed by René Elizondo Jr., best known for his work with Janet Jackson.

During the COVID-19 pandemic, McLean released "Love Song Love" on April 27, 2021, which showcased his support for the LGBT community and then put out a new single "Smoke" on July 15, 2022, that he recorded with his group ATCK.

My name is Alexander James (2026)

On February 14, 2024, (Valentine's Day), McLean released a new song called Electric under his full name, Alexander James. In March 2024, McLean announced that he and NSYNC member Joey Fatone were coheadlining a tour together.

=== Sex, Love & Music (2026) ===
On September 15, 2026, McLean released the single "Into Your Heart", as the lead single from his upcoming third studio album, Sex, Love & Music.

=== Non-music works ===
On July 22, 2015, McLean launched Skulleeroz Vapor, a line of liquids for use with electronic cigarettes.

In 2020, McLean announced his nail polish line Ava Dean Beauty, which launched on November 30, 2020. He was inspired by his daughters.

== Television and film appearances ==
In 1992, McLean was a contestant on the kids' game show Nickelodeon Guts. In April 2002, he made a guest appearance voicing himself in the Static Shock episode "Duped".

McLean also appeared and performed with the Backstreet Boys on Arthur, Sesame Street, Sabrina the Teenage Witch, and Saturday Night Live. The Backstreet Boys, including McLean, made their film debut by appearing in the 2013 comedy This Is the End. In September 2018, McLean provided the voice of the golden mole Kuchimba on an episode of Disney's The Lion Guard. In 2016, McLean appeared in bandmate Nick Carter's music video for "19 in 99" as a pizza deliveryman. In 2019, he voiced the character Lucy the Fairy in the episode "Cedric & the Fairies" of The Bravest Knight. On November 16, 2021, McLean announced he was to be the host for the second season of Fashion Hero, filming in South Africa in 2022.

=== Dancing with the Stars ===
In August 2020, McLean was announced as one of the celebrities competing on season 29 of Dancing with the Stars, placing seventh in the competition.

=== RuPaul's Secret Celebrity Drag Race ===
McLean was revealed as a contestant on RuPaul's Secret Celebrity Drag Race as Poppy Love. On September 30, 2022, during the season finale, Poppy Love was crowned the winner. Due to his win, Trans Lifeline would receive a $100,000 award.

=== Building the Band ===
In 2025, McLean is the host of the new Netflix reality competition series, Building the Band, alongside judges Nicole Scherzinger, Kelly Rowland, and the late Liam Payne. Following Payne's untimely death in October 2024, McLean announced at 90s Con in Hartford, Connecticut, that the series would be dedicated to Payne's memory, highlighting their shared experiences and the bond they formed during filming.

== Personal life ==
After McLean's grandmother died in 2001, he struggled with alcohol addiction. In 1999, the International Star Registry named a star in the Aquila constellation after McLean. On June 7, 2021, McLean's stepfather Tony Solis died.

=== Relationships ===
McLean has had several relationships during his career. After joining the Backstreet Boys in 1992, McLean began dating Marissa Jackson, daughter of former manager Donna Wright and stepdaughter of Johnny Wright; their relationship lasted for six years. She is seen in the music video for "We've Got It Goin' On" and helped out on the band's first world tour with wardrobe and as a hairstylist. After their breakup, she wrote the book Loving A.J.: My 6-Year Romance with a Backstreet Boy. McLean dated Amanda Latona of Innosense for two years, one of the band's dancers, Kristin Denehy, for 3 months and was engaged to singer Sarah Martin in 2002 but they split up.

McLean met model and makeup artist/hairstylist Rochelle Deanna Karidis in October 2001, before the two reunited in 2006 and then began dating in 2009. On his birthday in 2010, McLean proposed to Karidis. He credits her with motivating him to get sober and overcome his years-long struggle with drug addiction. The couple got married on December 17, 2011, at the Beverly Hills Hotel with the rest of the Backstreet Boys in attendance. They have two daughters together. On New Year's Day 2024, after 12 years of marriage, the couple announced their decision to divorce after temporarily separating. Just recently, during his album release event in LA, Mclean (now referred to as Alex) shared on his Instagram livestream that he and Rochelle are in a better place and moving in together again.

=== Substance abuse ===
At the height of his Backstreet Boys career, McLean suffered from drug and alcohol addiction. He stated the first time he used cocaine was on the set of the video for "The Call" in 2000. His bandmate Kevin Richardson confronted him in July 2001. McLean threatened to quit the band but later broke down and arranged rehab for drug and alcohol abuse. On July 9, 2001, a press release stated that the remaining dates in Boston would be canceled after Nick Carter injured his hand. The rest of the group appeared on MTV's Total Request Live to announce McLean was going into rehab for one month, after which the group resumed their Black & Blue Tour.

He entered rehab once again in 2002. On January 10, 2011, he checked into rehab for the third time, stating it was for personal reasons. In preparation for the New Kids on the Block and Backstreet Boys' NKOTBSB tour, McLean said, "I want to be healthy and perform and sing for people at my very best and happiest." His time in rehab did not affect the tour. He said he wanted to be healthy and sober before getting married. He originally planned to marry in May 2011 but had pushed back the date because of the NKOTBSB Tour. McLean admitted in 2020 that he had relapsed at the end of 2019, but was working to stay sober to be a better husband and father.

After 20 years free of alcohol, McLean began hosting 12-step Alcoholics Anonymous meetings. He said he had divided his career from his personal life because of the strain of touring. He told People that he "battled self-esteem issues my entire life, and I've learned a lot. My sobriety is the most solid it's ever been."

=== Health and fitness ===
In 2020, before his appearance on Dancing with the Stars, McLean stated he was completely sober and following a strict diet: grain-free, gluten-free, plant-based, and sugar-free. Two years later, he reported success in losing excess weight, keeping a trim body and not having alcohol or fast food.

== Discography ==
=== Albums ===
Title	Album details	Peak positions
Title	Album details	JPN
Have It All	Released: January 20, 2010; Label: Avex; Formats: CD, digital download	31
My Name Is Alexander James	Released: January 9, 2026; Label: Johnny Wright Entertainment; Formats: Digital download, streaming	—
Sex, Love & Music	Scheduled: November 27, 2026; Label: Johnny Wright Entertainment; Formats: Digital download, streaming	—

=== EPs ===
Title	EP details
Hi My Name Is Alex	Released: November 27, 2025; Label: Johnny Wright Entertainment; Formats: Digital download, streaming

=== Singles ===
==== As main artist ====
Year	Title	Peak positions	Album
Year	Title	US AC	Album
2010	"Teenage Wildlife"	—	Have It All
2015	"Live Together"	—	Non-album singles
2018	"Night Visions"	—	Non-album singles
2019	"Boy and a Man"	—	Non-album singles
2021	"Love Song Love"	—	Non-album singles
2022	"Smoke"	—	Non-album singles
2024	"Electric"	—	Non-album singles
2026	"Flowers"	—	My Name Is Alexander James
2026	"Into Your Heart"	28	Sex, Love & Music

==== Promotional singles ====
Year	Title	Album
2015	"You"	Non-album singles
2018	"Back Porch Bottle Service"	Non-album singles
2019	"Give You Away"	Non-album singles
2020	"Love on the Brain"	Non-album singles

==== Duets ====
Year	Single	Peak chart position	Album
Year	Single	FIN	Album
2013	"Clouds" (with Redrama)	4	Reflection

== Filmography ==
Year	Film	Role	Notes
1986	Truth or Dare?	Young Mike Strauber	
1991	Hi Honey, I'm Home!	Sidney "Skunk" Duff	Original pilot episode
1992	Nickelodeon Guts	Himself	Known as AJ "Mean" McLean
1993	Welcome Freshmen	Sophomore Boy	Episode: "Othello the (Sopho)moor"
1993	Tickits	Boy in Car	Short film
1998	Sabrina the Teenage Witch	Himself	Episode: "Battle of the Bands"
1998–1999	Saturday Night Live	Himself	"Julianne Moore/Backstreet Boys" (Season 23: episode 16) "Sarah Michelle Gellar/Backstreet Boys" (Season 24: episode 19)
1999	Fully Booked	Himself	Episode: "5.2"
2001	Olive Juice	DJ Naughty	
2002	Static Shock	Himself	Voice, episode: "Duped"
2002	Arthur	Himself	Voice, episode: "Arthur, It's Only Rock and Roll"
2002	Sesame Street	Himself	Episode: "3987"
2005	The Ellen DeGeneres Show	Himself	Musical Guest with the Backstreet Boys
2005	SMAPxSMAP	Himself	Musical Guest with the Backstreet Boys
2009	El Hormiguero	Himself	Musical Guest with the Backstreet Boys
2012	Late Night with Jimmy Fallon	Himself	Musical Guest with the Backstreet Boys
2013	This Is the End	Himself	With the Backstreet Boys, performing "Everybody (Backstreet's Back)"
2013	El Hormiguero	Himself	Musical Guest with the Backstreet Boys
2014	I Heart Nick Carter	Himself	
2016	Undateable	2 episodes	
2016	Dead 7	Johnny Vermillion	
2018	The Lion Guard	Kuchimba	Voice, episode: "The Underground Adventure"
2019	The Bravest Knight	Lucy	
2019	The Boy Band Con: The Lou Pearlman Story	Himself	
2020	Dancing with the Stars	Himself (contestant)	Season 29
2021	Days of Our Lives	Van Driver	
2022	RuPaul's Secret Celebrity Drag Race	Poppy Love (contestant), winner	Season 2
2025	Building the Band	Host	
2026	The Jennifer Hudson Show	Interview/Performance	Daughters Elliott (Ava) and Lyric made a surprise appearance
2026	Today Show	Performance	
