= Nick Carter =

American singer (born 1980)

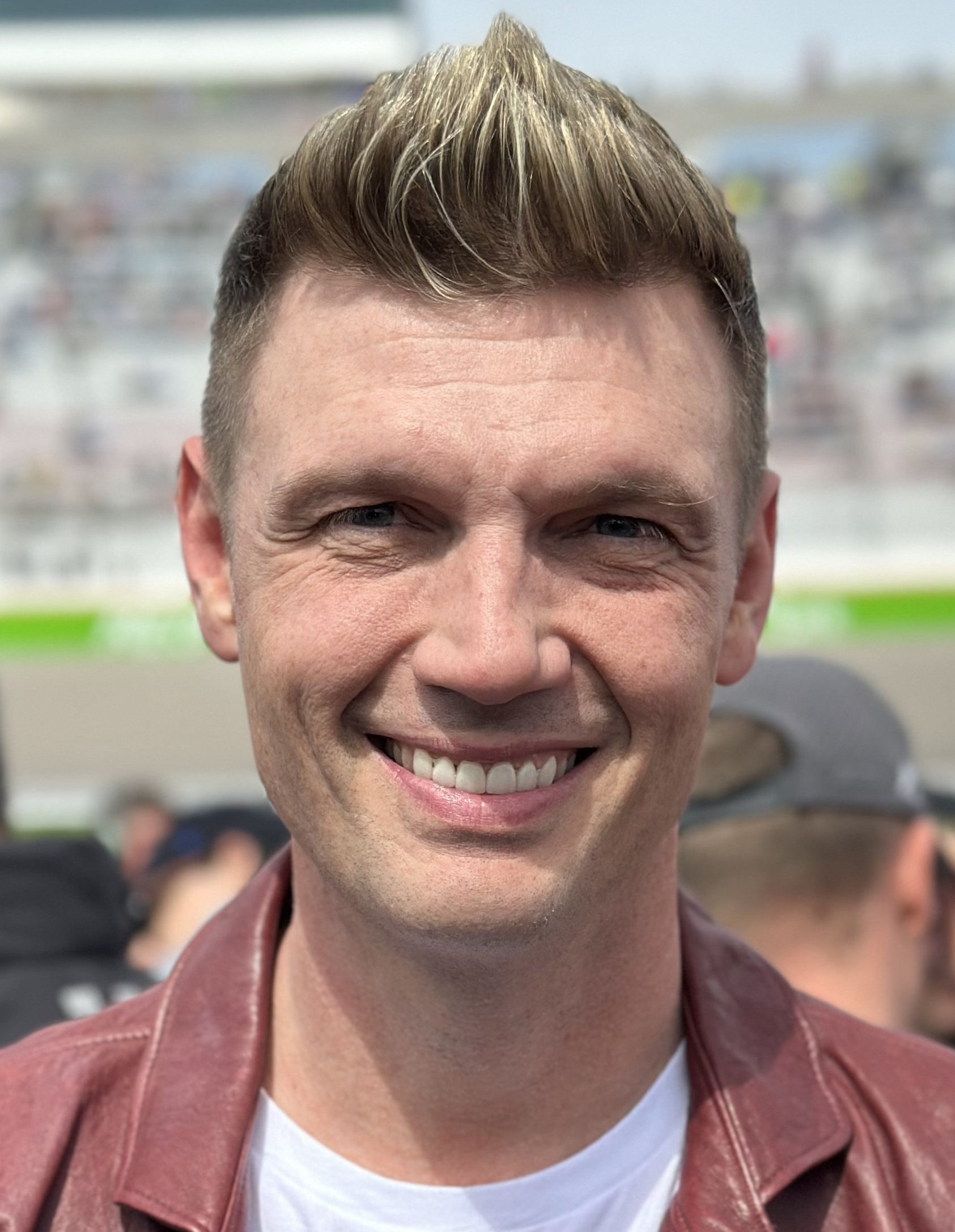
- Carter in 2025
- Born: Nickolas Gene Carter; January 28, 1980 (age 46); Jamestown, New York, U.S.
- Occupations: Singer; songwriter; actor; dancer
- Years active: 1989–present
- Spouse: Lauren Kitt (m. 2014)
- Children: 3
- Relatives: Leslie Carter (sister); Aaron Carter (brother)
- Musical career
- Genres: Pop; pop rock; R&B; dance
- Instruments: Vocals; guitar
- Labels: Jive; RCA; Zomba; 604; Kaotic, Inc.
- Member of: Backstreet Boys
- Formerly of: NKOTBSB
- Website: nickcarter.net

Signature
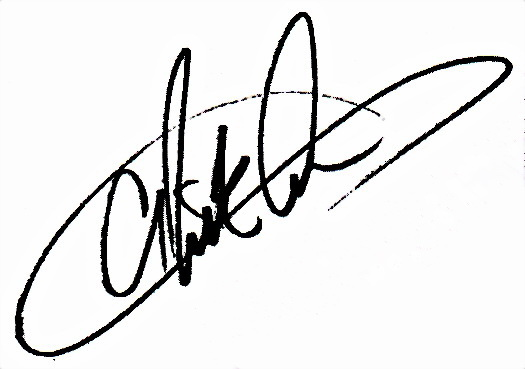

Nickolas Gene Carter (born January 28, 1980) is an American singer and a lead vocalist of the vocal group Backstreet Boys. As of 2025, he has released four solo albums: Now or Never (2002), I'm Taking Off (2011), All American (2015), and Love Life Tragedy (2025), all during breaks in the Backstreet Boys' schedule, as well as a collaboration album with Jordan Knight titled Nick & Knight. He has also made occasional television appearances and starred in the reality shows House of Carters and I (Heart) Nick Carter.

== Early life ==
Carter was born in Jamestown, New York, where his parents, Jane Eleonora Schneck (née Spaulding, previously Carter) and Robert Carter (died 2017), owned a bar called the Yankee Rebel in Westfield, New York. His ancestry is primarily Northern and Western European, Scandinavian, and Italian.

Several years later, when Carter was four years old, the family moved to Ruskin, Florida, near Tampa, where they managed the Garden Villa Retirement Home and expanded their family.

Carter's siblings include Leslie Carter (1986–2012), Aaron Carter (1987–2022), Angel Carter (born 1987), and Bobbie Jean Carter (1982–2023).

== Career ==
Growing up, Carter began his acting and singing career at a young age when his mother heard him outside and enrolled him in voice lessons with a voice teacher named Marianne Prinkey. She later got him dance lessons in ballet, tap, and hip hop at Karl and DiMarco's School of Theatre and Dance when he was 10. Carter performed in several commercials, talent shows, and the Florida State Fair. He auditioned for several acting roles in the late 1980s and early 1990s, and performed around Tampa Bay, Florida. According to Carter, he played the lead role in the fourth-grade production of Phantom of the Opera at Miles Elementary School. He also did an educational video called Reach for a Book, a show called The Klub and performed at the Tampa Bay Buccaneers home games for two years. He also made a brief appearance in the 1990 Tim Burton film Edward Scissorhands as a child playing on a Slip 'N Slide. He stated, "It would be going too far to say I was actually in Edward Scissorhands because I was so far in the background that you can't tell it's me. It would be better to say I was on the set of the film... I was in the scene when Edward looks out of a window to the neighborhood. For a split second, he sees some kids playing - one of them was me. I was sliding on a yellow piece of plastic we used to call a Slip n' Slide. They were long flat sheets with water coming out of holes and were popular with kids at the time. I had to slide on one in the background of a shot. It was great fun being on the set but it was really cold and they made us do it a lot of times".

One of his dance teachers, Sandy, placed him in his first group, Nick and the Angels. Between 1989 and 1993, Carter recorded various popular songs, including "Breaking Up Is Hard to Do" and "Uptown Girl" and a few original songs that he would perform at events. These recordings appeared on an unofficial release called Before the Backstreet Boys 1989–1993 by Dynamic Discs, Inc., released in October 2002. It was revealed that through several auditions, Carter met AJ McLean and Howie Dorough and they became friends. At age 12, he put in a winning performance on the 1992 New Original Amateur Hour.

Carter has stated that he endured a difficult childhood in a turbulent, high-conflict home. He has added that he was bullied and beaten up during junior high school. Due to the unpleasant experiences he had in school, he left school and was homeschooled instead.

=== Backstreet Boys ===
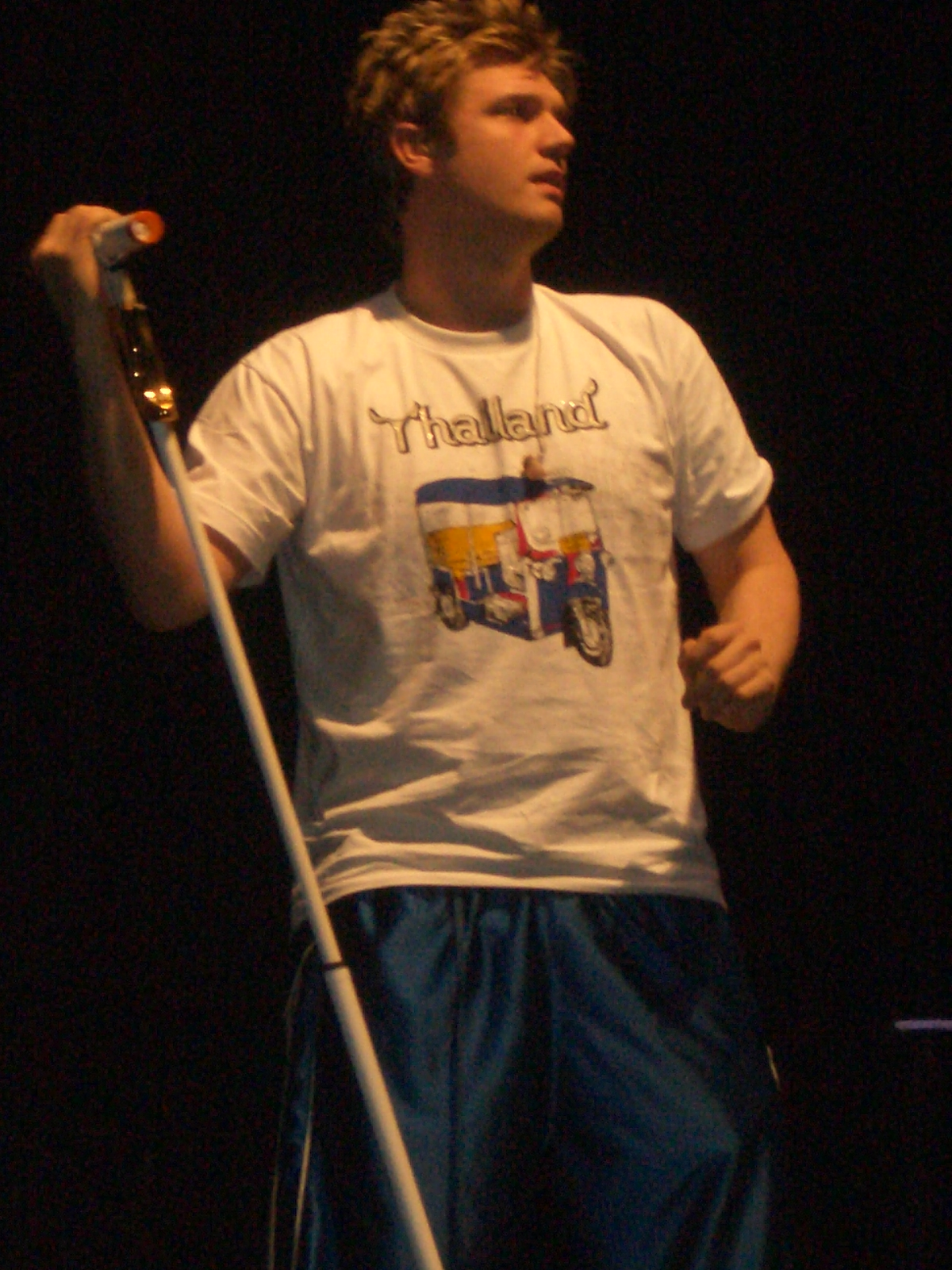
Carter with the Backstreet Boys in 2006

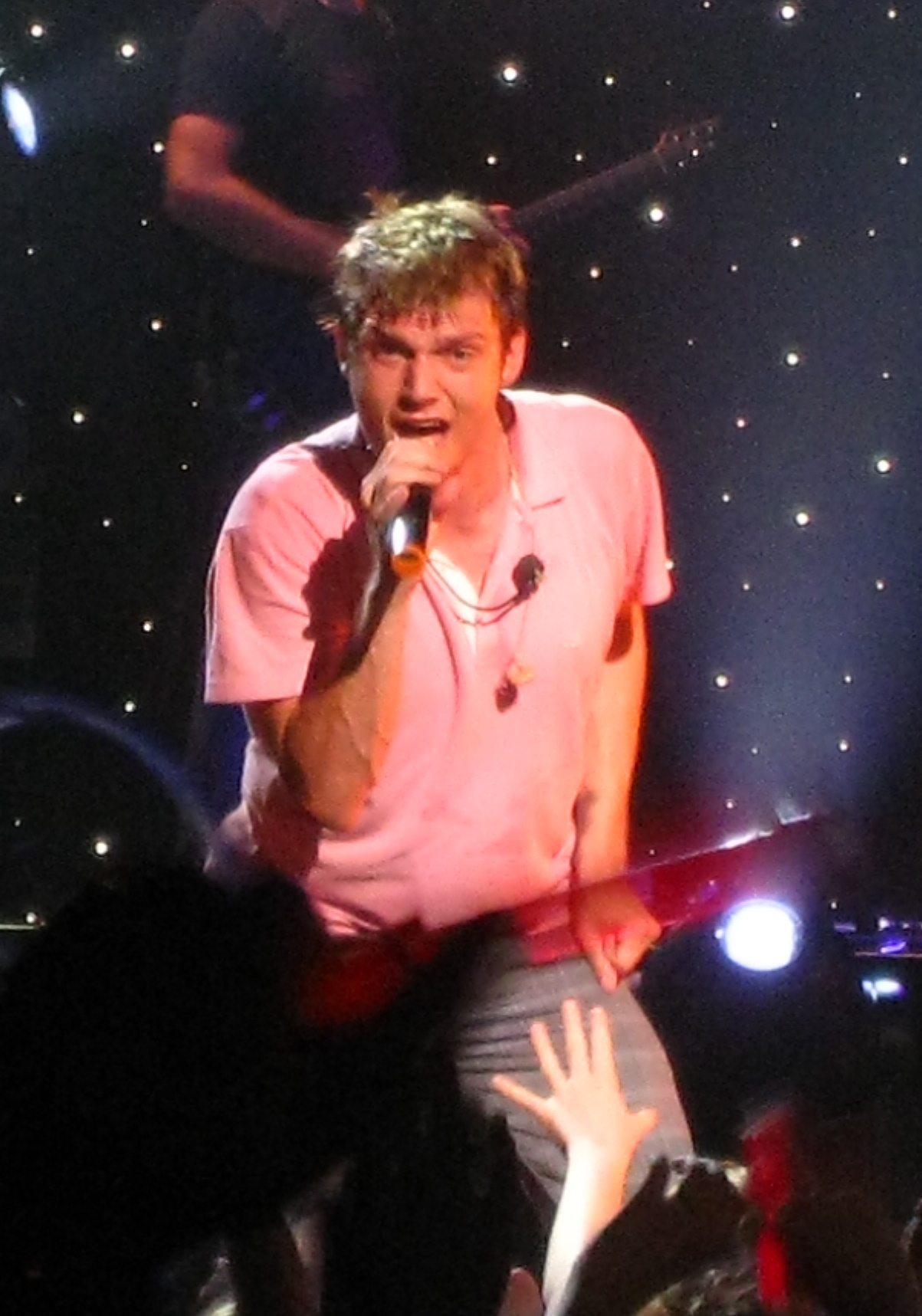
Carter with the Backstreet Boys in 2008

At 12 years old, Carter auditioned for Disney's The Mickey Mouse Club and the Backstreet Boys. He was asked to join the group and was given the choice of either joining The Mickey Mouse Club with a $50,000 contract or this new music group. Carter chose to join the group rather than the Mickey Mouse Club. After he joined the group, he had his own personal tutor on tour with him. In 2013 or 2014, Carter received his GED as shown on I Heart Nick Carter. On April 20, 1993, when he was 13 years old, Carter formed the vocal group the Backstreet Boys along with AJ McLean, Brian Littrell, Howie Dorough, and Kevin Richardson. Carter is the group's youngest member. The Backstreet Boys have recorded several albums, beginning in the mid-1990s, the latest being 2019's DNA. In March 2016, the group announced that they would begin an exclusive headlining residency at Planet Hollywood in Las Vegas called Backstreet Boys: Larger Than Life. By October 14, 2022, their first-holiday album A Very Backstreet Christmas was released.

=== Solo career ===
In 2002, when the Backstreet Boys expressed a strong desire to leave their management company, The Firm, Carter was the first member of the group to choose to remain with them, managing his solo career and working on a solo album. Around then, Carter began writing songs and recording during his downtime, when Jive asked him to create a solo album. As the group began recording their new album without him, he started working on his first solo album. In September 2002, Carter released the first single from his solo album, "Help Me" which did well on radio countdowns landing at #1 on various stations including New York City's Z100 and achieved considerable worldwide success while the other single, "I Got You" was a minor hit in Europe. On October 29, 2002, his first solo album Now Or Never was released and sold over 500,000 copies in the first week. It reached No. 17 on the Billboard 200 charts and was certified gold, both in the United States and Canada. The album also charted in many countries. He also launched a worldwide tour in support of the album. He was No. 9 of People magazine's "50 Most Beautiful People" in 2000 and was voted by readers of the teen magazine Cosmogirl's "Sexiest Man in the World" in their October 2002 issue, beating out such competition as actor Brad Pitt and rival pop star Justin Timberlake for the title, launching a media-hyped "rivalry" between Timberlake and Carter, culminating in an amicable 2009 meeting off-camera on the set of Late Night with Jimmy Fallon where Carter defeated Timberlake in an arm-wrestling match. He was also featured on the cover of the magazine.

Carter went on tour in early 2003, where he performed at smaller venues, such as clubs, which were much smaller than the ones he had been used to with the Backstreet Boys. That same year, Carter started working on his second solo album, which was put on hold when the Backstreet Boys returned to the studio to record a new album in 2004. One of the tracks from the earlier recording sessions was used as the theme song to the television series House of Carters in 2006. "Let It Go" was written by Carter, Matthew Gerrard, and Bridget Louise Benenate. It would be eight years before Carter finally focused on another solo album. Carter began working on the album in 2008, but most of the recording for his second solo album, "I'm Taking Off," took place during downtime between Backstreet Boys touring in 2010. "I'm Taking Off" was first released in Japan on February 2, 2011, and later released in the U.S. on May 24, 2011, exclusively on iTunes. The album was later released in other countries on different dates. It was Carter's first solo album without the help of a major label. He co-wrote every song released except for a bonus track in Japan. In Germany, the album was released by Glor, Canada 305 Records, and in Japan, AMEX.

Carter recorded a duet with pop singer Jennifer Paige called "Beautiful Lie" in 2009. In 2010, Carter started recording new songs for his second solo album, working with Rami Yacoub, Carl Falk, Toby Gad, Josh Hoge, and Claude Kelly, among many others. Carter's new album titled I'm Taking Off was released on February 2, 2011, in Japan, in Germany on June 3, 2011, and in the USA via iTunes on May 24. As of June 2011, Carter's second solo album reached No. 8 in Japan, selling over 20,000 copies.

In January 2014, Carter recorded a duet album with Jordan Knight from fellow boy band New Kids on the Block. They both worked on a duet album, titled Nick & Knight, which debuted at #24 on the US Billboard 200 and #14 in Canada. The tour to support the album ran from September to November 2014. They announced their album and tour on April 30 on "Good Morning America." The self-titled album was released on September 2, 2014. Fans were able to get a taste of the album when they pre-ordered it by receiving a download of the song "Just the Two of Us." The first single, "One More Time," was released on July 15, 2014. The album features a few tracks written by Carter and Jordan.

In 2015, Carter announced he would be working on a third solo album for release later that year. The album was called All American and was released digitally on November 25 via iTunes, Amazon, and Google Play. The CD release was delayed until February 2016 and was released in Japan that same month. He worked with Dan Muckala, Natasha Bedingfield, and others for most of the album. This album would see Carter returning to a pop/rock sound, similar to "Now or Never". Some tracks on the album also evoke the sound of the 1950s and 1960s. The first single from his new album, entitled "I Will Wait", was released on Vevo on October 1, 2015, and is an acoustic ballad. The new CD All American, was released on November 25, 2015. In support of the album, Carter toured in February and March 2016. Canadian pop/rock singer Avril Lavigne is also featured on Carter's album. She sings with him in the song "Get Over Me."

During the COVID-19 pandemic, Carter announced that he would be releasing new solo projects.

Two months after Aaron's death, Carter honored his brother with a new single, "Hurts To Love You," and the music video featured images of Aaron, including photos and home movies. Some of the lyrics to the song include, "It hurts to love you but I love you still/ Miss you with all my heart, you know I always will." On August 18, Carter released a new single, Superman, dedicating it to his family after everything they had been through with Aaron's death as well as how his sister Angel got involved with the foundation On Our Sleeves. This foundation works to help children facing mental and emotional health struggles. In conjunction with On Our Sleeves, Nick held an event honoring Aaron at a benefit concert in January.

In July 2023, Carter announced he would embark on his first solo tour in almost a decade. The Who I Am World Tour was a more personal show for fans to discover Carter's story of his many early musical influences before joining the Backstreet Boys. It would feature Carter performing music from his solo albums, Backstreet Boys songs, & covers of songs from the 1980s. The tour kicked off October 4, 2023 in Lexington, KY for an initial 14-city run across North America. It later expanded with Carter traveling to Latin America, Europe, Asia, and a second leg of North America.

Carter released two new singles, Made for Us and Never Break My Heart (Not Again) in 2024.

On July 17, 2025 Carter released a single from his album Searchlight.

On August 11, Carter released "Magic", his first single following Searchlight.

=== Emmy win ===
In August 2023, Carter offered his vocal talents for the rendition of "Happy Xmas," a song featuring patients from the Cure 4 The Kids Foundation, celebrities, and well-known recording artists such as Kyle Khou for the Christmas 4 The Kids digital album, released in 2023 for the holiday season. All proceeds from sales and streaming of the 22 songs continue to benefit the foundation. As a result, the song "Happy Xmas (Cancer's Over)" earned Carter and Mitch Koulouris their first-ever Pacific Southwest Emmy Award win in June 2024. The song was recognized with the 2024 Emmy Award for "Outstanding Musical Composition & Arrangement" by the National Academy of Television Arts and Sciences Pacific Southwest Chapter.

=== Acting career ===
Carter also did some acting, appearing on various TV shows, including the NBC show American Dreams in 2002 and ABC's 8 Simple Rules in 2003. In October 2004, he even starred as a High School football player, Brody, in the ABC Family Halloween special, The Hollow, opposite Kevin Zegers. The film first premiered on ABC Family during their 13 Nights of Halloween in October 2004. The film was edited for TV and younger audiences. It was initially rated R. The rated-R movie was later released on DVD. However, it would be a few years before Carter did any acting again, as the Backstreet Boys focused on their return to music in 2004.

In 2007, Carter filmed the independent movie Kill Speed with Brandon Quinn, Andrew Keegan, Natalia Cigliuti, Greg Grunberg, and Reno Wilson, where he played a character named Foreman. The movie was originally scheduled for release in 2008, but due to issues with the release (some say with distribution), it would be years before it was eventually released on DVD. In the US, it was released on June 12, 2012. While in the UK, its release was in 2010, along with some other countries. On May 8, 2012, he made a guest appearance on CW's 90210 and played himself. Carter made his big-screen debut in 2013, appearing in the comedy This Is the End along with the rest of the Backstreet Boys.

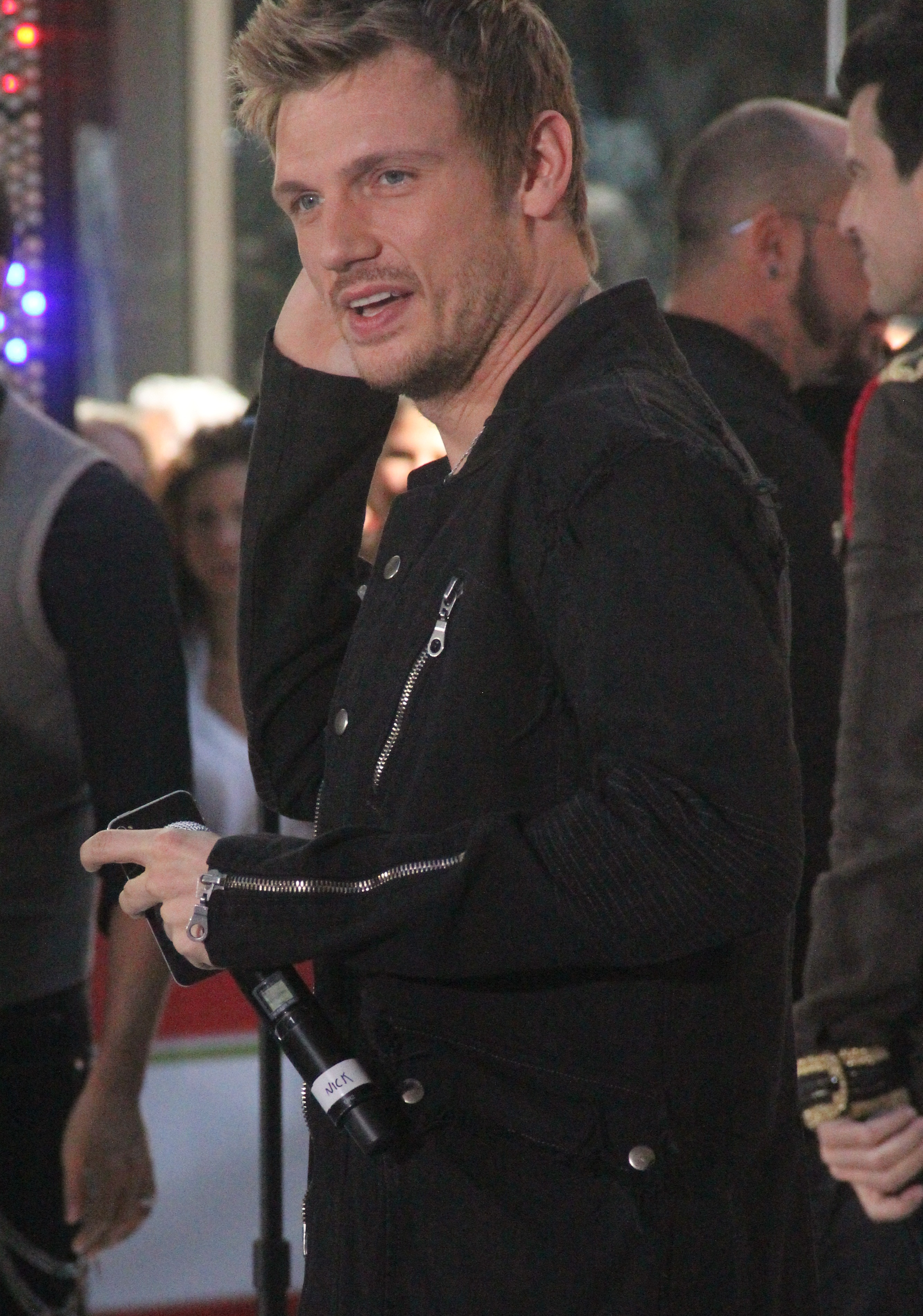
Carter in 2011

In July 2013, Carter launched a campaign on Indiegogo.com, a crowdfunding site, to raise money for his movie "Evil Blessings." The goal was to raise $85,000. Instead, the campaign raised $156,214. Carter has said he'll use his money and the money raised to fund the movie. In return for the donations, multiple perks were available depending on the amount donated. They included chats with Carter on Skype, adding the donor's name to the movie credits or on the website, movie merchandise (such as t-shirts, posters, DVDs, etc.), acting roles, premiere tickets, BSB concerts, an online concert, and more. Carter wrote the screenplay for the film. Due to a few setbacks, the film was delayed and put on hold. In July 2013, the director of the movie died. The film was initially scheduled to start filming in June 2014, but the Backstreet Boys' In a World Like This Tour 's success delayed filming and pushed it back to January 2015. That gave Carter some more time to rework the screenplay. In October 2014, Carter announced that this film would be postponed due to the director's death. Instead, he'll film a new movie called "Dead West" in January 2015. The money donated to "Evil Blessings" will be used for the production of this film. Carter hired the production company, The Asylum (the company that produced "Sharknado"), to help. In July 2015, Carter announced that the movie was renamed "Dead 7" to give it a more global appeal. "Dead 7" includes various members of different boy bands.

=== Reality TV career ===
In 2006, Carter and his siblings starred in their reality television show, House of Carters, which has been on the air since May 2006 and premiered on October 2, 2006, on E!. The series features all five Carter siblings reuniting to live in the same house in Los Angeles, as they attempt to reconnect as a family and get their lives together, while also exploring in-depth moments of their ups and downs. Their father, Robert Carter, and stepmother, Ginger R. Elrod, also appeared on the show. The series lasted one season, and eight episodes were aired.

In 2014, Carter returned to reality TV, and he and his wife (then fiancée at the time), Lauren Kitt, starred in their VH1 reality show, I Heart Nick Carter, which centered around the planning of their April 2014 wedding and premiered on September 10, 2014, on VH1. The show only had eight episodes. It documented Carter's life as he prepared for his wedding. This included Carter trying to set the wedding date between the Backstreet Boys' touring and footage of Carter working. Recording a new album with New Kids on the Block member Jordan Knight, various events such as a book signing, charity event, touring with Backstreet Boys in Europe (other group members also appeared on the show), his bachelor party, and much more. The wedding aired in a one-hour season finale. Carter announced on Twitter that VH1 did not renew the show for a second season.

On August 26, 2015, it was revealed that Carter would be taking part in the 21st season of Dancing with the Stars which began on September 14, 2015. He was paired with professional dancer Sharna Burgess. Carter and Burgess made the finals of the show and came in second place, behind Bindi Irwin and Derek Hough. He performed "I Will Wait" off his All American album live at the finale.

Week #	Dance/Song	Judges' score			Result
Week #	Dance/Song	Inaba	Hough	Tonioli	Result
1	Cha-cha-cha/"I Don't Like It, I Love It"	8	8	8	No Elimination
2	Jive/"Boogie Woogie Bugle Boy"; Foxtrot/"Coming Home"	7; 8	7; 8	7; 8	Safe
3	Viennese Waltz / "Did I Make the Most of Loving You?"	9	9^{1}/9	9	Safe
4	Jazz/"Everybody (Backstreet's Back)"	9	9	9	Safe
5^{2}	Paso Doble/"Don't Look Down"	9	9/8^{3}	9	No Elimination
6	Samba/"You Should Be Dancing"	9	10/10^{4}	10	Safe
7	Argentine Tango/"Bring Me to Life"; Team Freestyle/"This Is Halloween"	8; 10	8; 10	8; 10	Safe
8	Contemporary/"Can't Help Falling in Love"	10	10	10	Safe(Immunity)
9	Quickstep/"A Cool Cat in Town"; Team-Up Dance (Rumba)/"Hey Jude"	9; 9	9; 9	10; 9	Safe
10; Semi-finals	Tango/"Scars"; Samba Dance-off/"Lean On"; Trio Salsa/"No Doubt About It"	8 No; 10	8 Extra; 10	8 Points; 10	Last to be called Safe
11; Finals	Jive/"Runaway Baby"; Freestyle/"Larger than Life"; Salsa & TangoFusion/"Turn Up the Music"	10; 10; 10	10; 10; 10	10; 10; 10	Runner-up
^{1} Score given by guest judge Alfonso Ribeiro.^{2} For this week only, as part of "Partner Switch-Up" week, Carter did not dance with Burgess and instead danced with Witney Carson. Burgess danced with Andy Grammer.^{3} Score given by guest judge Maksim Chmerkovskiy.^{4} Score given by guest judge Olivia Newton-John.

In June 2017, Carter appeared alongside Emma Bunton and Timbaland as a judge on a new singing competition show called Boy Band.

In 2020, Carter competed as the "Crocodile" on the fourth season of The Masked Singer, finishing in third place.

Week #	Song	Judges' guesses				Result
Week #	Song	Robin Thicke	Jenny McCarthy	Ken Jeong	Nicole Scherzinger	Result
2	It's My Life					Safe
4	Toxic					Safe
8	Bleeding Love					Safe (Immunity)
10Semi-finals	Take On Me/I Don't Wanna Miss A Thing					Win
11; Holiday Singalong	Silent Night					No elimination
12; Finals	Open Arms					3rd Place

While the group was touring in Canada, Carter appeared on Chanteurs Masques, the Canadian version of the Masked Singer, this time as a Sphynx cat for one episode. He also performed a stellar rendition of Heart's “Alone” and ended the show with a performance of “I Want It That Way.” Nick's appearance on the show broke viewership records, drawing in over 2 million viewers.

=== Power boat racing ===
In 2002, Carter got into powerboat racing and started his own team, Nick Carter Racing, which won the National Championship in its first year.

== Charity work ==
Following the death of their brother Aaron in 2022, Carter and his sister Angel raised money for the On Our Sleeves organization, which supports mental health awareness and youth in crisis.

== Personal life ==
According to Extra, Carter had a difficult time going onstage since his brother Aaron's death in November 2022.

Carter honored Aaron with the song "Hurts to Love You", and the music video featured images of Aaron through photographs and home videos. On August 18, Carter shared that his sister Angel was involved with On Our Sleeves, a foundation supporting children facing mental and emotional health struggles. In conjunction with her work, Carter hosted a benefit concert in January to honor Aaron.

=== Relationships ===
Carter was previously in relationships with Debra Lafave, Willa Ford, and Paris Hilton.

In 2008, Carter met Lauren Michelle Kitt, a fitness influencer, YouTuber, WBFF competitor, and actress, through his sister at a gathering at his home in California. After dating for five years, Carter proposed, and the couple married in Santa Barbara, California, in 2014. Their wedding was featured in In Touch Weekly and was filmed for Carter's reality show I Heart Nick Carter. They have three children and live in the Southern Highlands Golf Club neighborhood of Las Vegas, Nevada.

== Legal issues ==
On January 2, 2002, Carter was arrested at Pop City nightclub in Tampa, Florida, and charged with a misdemeanor count of resisting/opposing a law enforcement officer without violence. Charges were later dismissed upon completion of community service.

In 2003 or 2004, Carter got his first DUI after refusing to comply with the police.

On March 5, 2005, Carter was arrested in Huntington Beach, California, and charged with one count of driving under the influence and one count of driving with a blood alcohol level above 0.08, the legal limit. Carter pled guilty to the charges and was fined $1,200, placed on three years of informal probation, had his driving privileges restricted for 90 days and was required to undergo a three-month alcohol education program.

On January 13, 2016, Carter was arrested in Key West, Florida after he was refused service at a bar due to "high levels of intoxication". After getting into a physical altercation with the bar's bouncers, Carter was asked to leave by management and was charged with misdemeanor battery. Carter has subsequently acknowledged ongoing struggles with drug and alcohol abuse. He revealed that he started drinking when he was just two years old and again at nine. He says that he became sober after being diagnosed with cardiomyopathy and realized that he could die if he did not make major lifestyle changes. The singer credits fellow Backstreet Boys member Kevin Richardson for helping him turn his life around by giving him Norman Vincent Peale's book Why Some Positive Thinkers Get Powerful Results. After reading that book he started a healthier lifestyle, saying "Working out definitely helped my self-esteem, and it helped to kind of push it all aside. I just started replacing drinking and the parties... with healthier things like sports, video games." Carter also appeared on The Ellen DeGeneres Show on February 19, 2009, to discuss his past with drug and alcohol addictions. In December 2011, Carter again appeared on TV to talk about his struggle with drugs and alcohol, this time on The Dr. Phil Show's "Second Chances" special. This segment led to his first book deal with Bird Street Books. In 2013, he published the memoir titled Facing the Music and Living to Talk About It.

In September 2019, Carter was granted a temporary restraining order against his younger brother Aaron after alleging that Aaron threatened to kill his then-pregnant wife. On November 20, 2019, Carter was granted a one-year restraining order against Aaron one day after Angel Carter and her husband, Corey Conrad, were granted a one-year restraining order against Aaron.

On February 18, 2022, in a class-action lawsuit filed against the cryptocurrency company SafeMoon that alleged the company is a pump and dump scheme, Carter was named a defendant along with YouTuber and professional boxer Jake Paul, rappers Soulja Boy and Lil Yachty, and social media personality Ben Phillips for promoting the SafeMoon token on their social media accounts with misleading information. On the same day, the U.S. 11th Circuit Court of Appeals ruled in a lawsuit against Bitconnect that the Securities Act of 1933 extends to targeted solicitation using social media.

=== Sexual assault allegations ===
==== 2006 incident ====
In October 2017, Radar Online reported on a March 2006 incident involving a 20-year-old fan at a house party. Information was obtained from an incident report filed by police in West Allis, Wisconsin. The alleged victim, whose name was not disclosed, stated that after drinking with Carter and his friend Rob Kalouch, she was digitally penetrated by Carter and was forced to perform oral sex on both men. She stated that she refused them, telling them that she had a boyfriend and was "saving herself for marriage". The alleged victim stated that the two attempted to have intercourse with her later, as she pretended to be asleep. The report indicated that afterward, she was brought to the hospital and interviewed by police. The victim did not press charges, and the case was closed in June 2006.

==== Melissa Schuman accusation ====
In November 2017, following the Radar Online report, Melissa Schuman, a former member of the girl group Dream, publicly claimed that Carter had raped her. The alleged rape occurred in 2003, according to paperwork filed by the Los Angeles County District Attorney's Office. Schuman said Carter provided her with alcohol and slipped a roofie into the alcohol before raping her. Schuman stated that she was emboldened to disclose the incident after observing similarities to the 2006 accusation. Carter denied Schuman's allegation. In February 2018, it was reported that the Los Angeles County District Attorney's Office would not pursue charges against Carter in the case because the statute of limitations had expired. Schuman later sued Carter over the allegation in April 2023. In August 2024, it was revealed that Carter had countersued Schuman for $2.5 million, accusing her of defamation. In court documents, Carter said Schuman's lawsuit alone cost him "millions". Surprisingly, new sources report that Carter sued another person in connection with the case: Schuman's mother, for her involvement in running a defamatory Twitter page.

==== Shannon Ruth accusation ====
On December 8, 2022, Shannon Ruth filed a lawsuit against Carter, alleging that he had raped her on board the Backstreet Boys' tour bus in 2001 when she was a 17-year-old fan. Carter vehemently denied the allegation, stating that the lawsuit was a "press stunt" by Ruth's lawyers.

Following the lawsuit, ABC, Hulu, and Disney+ canceled A Very Backstreet Holiday, a television holiday special featuring the Backstreet Boys scheduled to air the following week on December 14, 2022. Other cancellations included the Backstreet Boys' $350,000 holiday promotion for MeUndies; endorsement deals with Tonies, The Children's Place, Vrbo, Expedia, and Roblox; their Jingle Ball performance on The CW; appearances on GMA, The Kelly Clarkson Show, and La semaine des 4 Julie; and an album signing at the Edge NYC. In response, fans boycotted ABC and The Kelly Clarkson Show for what they called "cancel culture".

==== August 2023 lawsuit ====
On August 28, 2023, a lawsuit was filed by a plaintiff, known as Ashley Repp or a.r, who accused Carter of drugging and sexually assaulting her on multiple occasions in 2003. The alleged victim was 15 years old at the time. Carter is alleged to have raped the victim on a tour bus and his yacht. Carter allegedly provided the minor with drugs and alcohol and infected her with HPV. The minor reported these incidents to her mother, who in turn reported them to the police; however, no charges were filed against Carter at the time. The lawsuit stated that Carter had "instructed the victim to keep his sexual abuse of her a secret".

However, Carter stated that he had an alibi for the time of the alleged SA, sharing that he was really in a different state miles away from her.

==== April 2025 accusation ====
A woman named Laura Penly sued Carter in 2025 for allegedly raping her in 2005. Penly accused Carter of infecting her with STDs, including the human papillomavirus (HPV). The HPV infection allegedly led to cervical cancer. Penly said she and Carter had consensual sex three times between December 2004 and February 2005. However, in her last encounter with Carter, she claimed he refused to wear a condom and that she did not consent to unprotected sex. According to the lawsuit, Carter "picked [Penly] up off the ground and threw her onto his bed" and raped her "forcefully" despite her "saying 'no' multiple times". Penly claimed she was harassed by the Backstreet Boys' and Carter's fans after her testimony in the initial deposition. She stated she "was diagnosed with Stage 2 cervical cancer and had to undergo numerous treatments", which "[caused] severe emotional distress...medical issues...and other complex trauma". She is seeking damages of more than $15,000 for Carter's "'willful and conscious disregard' for her safety". Carter denied Penly's accusations in a statement released by his lawyers.

==== Fallen Idols ====
Carter and his late brother, Aaron, are the subjects of a docuseries on ID and Max called Fallen Idols, which premiered over two nights on May 27 and 28, 2024. The series dives into the sexual assault allegations against the Backstreet Boys singer, as well as his brother's mental health struggles and substance abuse issues that led to his death. The docuseries included interviews with family members, close friends, industry professionals, and Nick's accusers—Melissa Schuman, Ashley Repp, and Shannon Ruth—as well as a member of the Carter family, Aaron's former fiancée Melanie Martin, and Kaya Jones (who claimed to be Nick's ex-girlfriend in 2004) to paint a picture of how the brothers' tumultuous upbringing contributed to their ups and downs.

In a statement to Us Weekly, Carter's attorney, Dale Hayes Jr., addressed the claims made in Fallen Idols, saying, "These are exactly the same outrageous claims that led us to sue this gang of conspirators. Those cases are working their way through the legal system now, and based on both the initial court rulings and the overwhelming evidence, we have every belief that we will prevail and hold them accountable for spreading these falsehoods."

==== Other developments ====
Carter attributes his development of post-traumatic stress disorder (PTSD) to the allegations made against him, and has since filed defamation claims against all three accusers.

In March 2023, Las Vegas judge Nancy Allf ruled that Carter was allowed to countersue Ruth for libel. In August 2023, a Las Vegas judge ruled that Carter presented sufficient evidence to countersue Schuman for defamation. Carter later countersued all three accusers. The countersuits encompass terminated endorsement deals, mental anguish, legal fees, and other damages. Since the premiere of the docuseries "Fallen Idols," Carter has filed another lawsuit against Schuman, stating that her alleged lies and defamatory statements cost him and the band a seven-figure deal. He later received a witness statement stating that Schuman's claims were all lies.

Repp's anti-SLAPP motion was granted in August 2024. However, Carter has since filed an appeal against Repp and filed court docs demanding Repp's claims be thrown out January 7. A trial date was set for Carter's countersuit against Schuman in December, but was rescheduled to May 10, 2027 while Repp and Ruth's cases were heard together in Nevada in March 2026 and Penly's case is scheduled for October 12, 2026. On March 25, 2026, Judge Joe Hardy of the Eighth Judicial District Court of Nevada granted a motion to continue Ruth and Schumer's joint case against Carter, and postponed the jury trial for their lawsuit against Carter to March 15, 2027 as well. On March 27, 2026, the Supreme Court of Nevada granted a motion to have Repp continue her lawsuit against Carter. However, according to recent updates, both Repp and her lawyers have failed to provide receipts for her claims, leading to a loss in a motion and a fine for failing to cooperate with discovery, and the judge penalized the plaintiffs' lawyers for their misconduct. .

One month after the Fallen Idols docuseries premiere, another woman contacted Schuman privately about allegedly being sexually assaulted by Carter, stating her identity and enough "specific details" to appear "credible". Schuman's lawyer told Rolling Stone that the accuser, who alleges she was assaulted sometime after 2003, had offered to give testimony in support of Schuman's litigation.

== Discography ==
Solo albums

- Now or Never (2002)
- I'm Taking Off (2011)
- All American (2015)
- Love Life Tragedy (2025)

Collaborative albums

- Nick & Knight (2014) (with Jordan Knight)

=== Singles ===
==== As main artist ====
Year	Single	Album
2002	Help Me	Now or Never
2002	Do I Have to Cry For You	Now or Never
2003	I Got You	Now or Never
2011	Just One Kiss	I'm Taking Off
2011	Love Can't Wait	I'm Taking Off
2011	I'm Taking off	I'm Taking Off
2012	Burning Up	I'm Taking Off
2014	One More Time (feat. Jordan Knight)	Nick & Knight
2015	I Will Wait	All American
2016	19 in 99	All American
2020	80's Movie	Non-album singles
2021	Scary Monster	Non-album singles
2022	Easy (feat. Jimmie Allen)	Non-album singles
2023	Hurts to Love You	Love Life Tragedy
2023	Superman	Love Life Tragedy
2023	Made for Us	Love Life Tragedy
2023	Never Break My Heart (Not Again)	Love Life Tragedy
2025	Dirty Laundry	Love Life Tragedy
2025	Searchlight	Love Life Tragedy
2025	Stages	Non-album singles
2024	So Sweet (The Amazing Digital Circus) (feat. Rockit Music & NCX)	Non-album singles
2026	Magic	Non-album singles

== Filmography ==
TV series & Movies
Year	Film	Role	Notes
1998	Sabrina The Teenage Witch	Himself	Episode: "Battle of the Bands"
1998–1999	Saturday Night Live	Himself and Musical Guest	"Julianne Moore/Backstreet Boys" (Season 23, episode 16) "Sarah Michelle Gellar/Backstreet Boys" (Season 24, episode 19)
2002	American Dreams	Jay Black	Episode: "Soldier Boy"
2002	Arthur	Himself	Guest Voice, episode: "Arthur, It's Only Rock and Roll"
2002	All That	Himself	Sketch Performance
2002	Sesame Street	Himself	Appeared with Aaron Carter
2002	Sesame Street	Himself	Appeared with the Backstreet Boys
2002	Star Search	Himself	Appeared with Aaron Carter
2003	8 Simple Rules	Ben Hatcher	Season 1, episodes 17 & 18
2003	American Juniors	Himself	Guest Judge
2003	Punk'd	Himself	Season 2
2004	The Hollow	Brody	ABC TV Movie
2005	The Ellen DeGeneres Show	Himself	Musical Guest With the Backstreet Boys
2006	House of Carters	Himself	Reality show
2007	Kathy Griffin: My Life on the D-List	Himself	Episode: "Dating for Publicity"
2009	El Hormiguero	Himself	Musical Guest with the Backstreet Boys
2010	Kill Speed	Foreman	Direct-to-video
2010	The Pendant	Barrett	Actor and Director
2011	Dr. Phil	Himself	Interview and performance of "Burning Up"
2012	90210	Himself	Special Guest
2012	Late Night with Jimmy Fallon	Himself	Musical Guest with the Backstreet Boys
2013	El Hormiguero	Himself	Musical Guest with the Backstreet Boys
2013	This Is the End	Nick Carter	With the Backstreet Boys, performing "Everybody (Backstreet's Back)"
2014	I (Heart) Nick Carter	Himself	Main Cast
2015; 2017	Dancing with the Stars	Himself	Contestant on season 21; Guest judge for week 6 on season 24
2016	Dead 7	Jack	Feature Film Executive Producer/ Actor
2017	Boy Band	Himself	Judge
2020	The Masked Singer	Crocodile	Contestant (season 4)
2022	Chanteurs Masques	Sphynx cat	The Canadian version of The Masked Singer, surprise performance

Awards and achievements
Preceded by Riker Lynch & Allison Holker	Dancing with the Stars (US) runner up Season 21 (Fall 2015 with Sharna Burgess)	Succeeded by Paige VanZant & Mark Ballas
