= I Will Wait (Nick Carter song) =

Single by Nick Carter

from the album All American
- Released: September 12, 2015
- Recorded: 2015
- Genre: Pop
- Length: 3:25
- Label: Kaotic, Inc
- Songwriters: Nick Carter; Bryan Shackle; Thomas Kipp Williams; Dan Muckala

Nick Carter singles chronology
"One More Time" (2014)	"I Will Wait" (2015)	"Get Over Me" (2015)

Music video
- "I Will Wait" on YouTube

"I Will Wait" is a song by American singer and songwriter Nick Carter. The song was released in US and Canada as a digital download on September 12, 2015. It was the first single from his third solo album All American.

The song climbed to #1 on Billboard's Trending 140 chart and #134 on the Hot Digital Songs chart following its release.

== Background ==
"When I wrote the song, I think we wrote it with the intention going back to what the Backstreet Boys and what we were known for, which is love songs. As a writer and an artist, sometimes as your career goes on, you try to make points, and you try to be overly creative." Nick Carter said, "I just wanted to go back to the basics, and tap into what our fans knew us for." He also claimed this song was inspired by Ed Sheeran's songwriting.

== Music video ==
The music video for "I Will Wait" was filmed and released on YouTube and Vevo on September 22, 2015. Carter stated that the inspiration of the video was based on The Notebook.

There are a lot of stories that are in the video. The song really kind of was like an old-fashioned love song. It sort of has fifties elements to it. So when I decided to do the video, we had this idea of doing my own take on The Notebook. With some elderly couples, it had some similarities to that. So we found an actual couple who had been married for forty/fifty years in Hollywood that worked together as actors. So they were able to portray this couples who -- if you watch the video you'll see that one of them passed away -- and then they go to Heaven together. But they truly were in love and still are together. So it was really, really, really sad, but also cool as well to see that there was an inner love story. I thought the song was really beautiful, but when people watch a music video, and if there's something they can emotionally attach to, it hits even deeper into the soul and into the heart.

— Nick Carter, I Heart Radio

== Live performance ==
On November 24, Carter first performed the song on the finale of Dancing with the Stars, where he was one of the four finalists.

== Release history ==
Release history and formats for "I Will Wait"
Region	Date	Format	Label
United States	September 12, 2015	Digital download	Kaotic Inc.
Canada	September 12, 2015	Digital download	Kaotic Inc.
