= I'll Wait for You =

I'll Wait for You may refer to:

- I'll Wait for You (film), a 1941 American drama film
- "I'll Wait for You" (Joe Nichols song)
- "I'll Wait for You" (Frankie Avalon song)
- "I'll Wait for You", a song by the Bicycles from the album Oh No, It's Love (2008)

== See also ==
- I'll Wait (disambiguation)
- I Will Wait (disambiguation)
