= I'll Wait (disambiguation) =

"I'll Wait" is a song by Van Halen from the album 1984.

I'll Wait may also refer to:

- "I'll Wait (Kygo and Sasha Sloan song)", a song by Kygo and Sasha Sloan from the album Golden Hour
- "I'll Wait", a song by Sara Groves from the album Invisible Empires
- "I'll Wait", a 1993/94 single by Taylor Dayne

== See also ==
- I Will Wait (disambiguation)
- I'll Wait for You (disambiguation)
