= Have It All (AJ McLean album) =

Studio album by AJ McLean
- Released: January 20, 2010
- Recorded: 2009
- Studio: Safehouse Studios, Burbank, California; CMK Studios, Los Angeles; The Fireplace, NYC; Glomo Studio, Nashville, TN; WhatInTheWhatThe Studio, L.A.
- Genre: Pop, pop rock
- Length: 41:36
- Label: Avex Group (Japan); Podwall Entertainment/Sony Music Entertainment (US)
- Producer: AJ McLean, JC Chasez, David Maurice, Dan Muckala, Kristian Lundin, Carl Falk, Jimmy Harry

Singles from Have It All
- 1. "Teenage Wildlife" Released: January 18, 2010

Have It All is the first solo album by the American singer-songwriter AJ McLean of the Backstreet Boys. The album was released on January 20, 2010.

== Background ==
The album is McLean's first as a solo artist, although he once toured on his own as alter-ego Johnny No Name. McLean describes Have It All as "something fans of the Backstreet Boys will take notice of, thanks to its slightly risqué vibe". For the album, McLean worked with a number of hitmakers like Kristian Lundin and Dan Muckala. "It's kind of a cross between a little bit of rock and funk and a little bit of dance," McLean said of the album. "It's a well-rounded record. I'm really proud of it and I've been working on it for almost five years. It's going to be a great, great record." McLean released a single from the album, "Teenage Wildlife", with a video directed by Wade Robson.

=== Recording ===
The bulk of the album was recorded with songwriters and producers Kristian Lundin and Dan Muckala. Lundin had previously worked with the Backstreet Boys on some of their highest-charting songs, including "Quit Playing Games (with My Heart)", while Muckala had also previously worked with the band on all three of their albums since their reformation in 2005. McLean revealed that one of the first tracks to be written for the album was "London", although the chorus for the track was not added until many months after initial conception, after McLean was inspired following a visit to the city. Much of the material composed with Lundin was also co-written by Lundin's long-time writing partner Carl Falk, who had also worked with the Backstreet Boys. JC Chasez, member of rival boyband NSYNC, composed the album's lead single, "Teenage Wildlife", alongside Jimmy Harry and Simon Wilcox. Chasez revealed in the behind-the-scenes video to accompany the official music video that he had written "Teenage Wildlife" many years previously and had been waiting to find the right artist to perform it. When he heard that McLean was writing an album, he offered the track to McLean and he loved it on the first listen. McLean also wrote a track with producer Mark Hudson, the only track on the album not to have production or a co-writing credit from Lundin, Muckala or Chasez.

== Track listing ==
Have it All — Standard edition
No.	Title	Writer(s)	Producer(s)	Length
1.	"Teenage Wildlife"	JC Chasez; Jimmy Harry; Simon Wilcox	Chasez; Harry	3:16
2.	"Have It All"	AJ McLean; Kristian Lundin; Carl Falk	Lundin; Falk	3:24
3.	"London"	McLean; Lundin; Falk	Lundin; Falk	3:15
4.	"Gorgeous"	McLean; Lundin	Lundin	3:28
5.	"What If"	McLean; Lundin	Lundin	3:53
6.	"Drive by Love"	McLean; Lundin; Falk	Lundin; Falk	3:24
7.	"Love Crazy"	McLean; Chasez; David Maurice	Chasez; Maurice	3:58
8.	"Sincerely Yours"	McLean; Dan Muckala; Lindy Robbins	Muckala	3:38
9.	"I Quit"	McLean; Muckala; Ben Glover	Muckala	2:48
10.	"I Hate It When You're Gone"	McLean; Muckala; Regie Hamm	Muckala	3:24
11.	"What It Do"	McLean; Mark Hudson	Mark Hudson	4:06
12.	"Mr. A"	McLean; Lundin; Falk; Rami Yacoub	Lundin; Falk	3:02

Have It All — Japanese deluxe edition bonus tracks
No.	Title	Writer(s)	Producer(s)	Length
13.	"Teenage Wildlife" (K. Ando O.H.C remix)	Chasez; Harry; Wilcox	Chasez; Harry	6:23
14.	"Teenage Wildlife" (Acapella)	Chasez; Harry; Wilcox	Chasez; Harry	3:16

Have It All — Japanese special edition bonus tracks
No.	Title	Length
1.	"Teenage Wildlife (Music Video)"
2.	"Behind the Scenes"
3.	"Have It All EPK"
4.	"Album Photo Shoot"
5.	"Short Film #1 (A Date With A.J.)"
6.	"Short Film #2 (The House)"
7.	"Short Film #3 (L.A. Tour)"
8.	"Promo Trip in Japan EPK"

== Personnel ==
- Jon Bradley – trumpet (tracks 6, 11)
- Mike Briones – trombone (tracks 6, 11)
- Chuck Butler – bass and acoustic guitar (tracks 8–10)
- JC Chasez – backing vocals (track 1), drums (track 7)
- Tom Coyne – mastering
- Dorian Crozier – engineer and drums (track 1)
- Mike Davis – trombone (track 7)
- John Deley – keyboards (track 7)
- Dan Deurloo – assistant engineer (tracks 8–10)
- Sami Diament – engineer, percussion, and synthesizer (track 11)
- Jimmy Emerzian – tenor saxophone (tracks 6, 11), alto and baritone saxophones (track 6)
- Carl Falk – engineer, mixing, keyboards, and programming (tracks 2, 3, 6, 12); guitar (tracks 2, 6, 12); horn engineer (track 6)
- Richard Fortus – guitar (track 7)
- Chris Fudurich – engineer (track 1)
- Jimmy Harry – engineer, bass, guitar, and keyboards (track 1)
- Mark Hudson – bass and guitar (track 11)
- Adam Lester – electric guitar (tracks 8–10)
- Kristian Lundin – engineer, mixing, keyboards, and programming (tracks 2–6, 12); horn engineer (track 6)
- Jeremy Lutito – drums (tracks 8–10)
- David Maurice – engineer, mixing, and bass (track 7)
- AJ McLean – vocals, guitar (track 5), drums and keyboards (track 11)
- Dan Muckala – engineer, mixing, instruments, and programming (tracks 8–10)
- Brian Paturalski – mixing (track 1)
- Kent Smith – trumpet (track 7)
- Andy Snitzer – saxophone (track 7)
- Rami Yacoub – engineer, mixing, keyboards, and programming (track 12)

== Charts ==
Chart (2010)	Peak position
Taiwan Albums (G-Music)	16
Japanese Albums (Oricon)	31
