= Nick & Knight =

Studio album by Nick Carter and Jordan Knight
- Released: September 2, 2014
- Recorded: March–July 2014
- Genre: Pop; pop rock
- Length: 35:28
- Label: Nick & Knight; Mass Appeal; BMG
- Producer: Mikhail Beltran; Louis Biancaniello; Nick Carter (exec.); Jamil Chammas; Alvin Garrett; Jeff Halatrax; Keith Harris; Jordan Knight (exec.); Anthony Kronfle; Andy Love; Jared Lee; Michael Mani; Mario Marchetti; Jordan Omley; Khaled Rohaim; Damon Sharpe; Marcus Siskind (also exec.); Jeremy Skaller; Stereotypes; Johan "Jones" Wetterberg

Nick Carter chronology
I'm Taking Off (2011)	Nick & Knight (2014)	All American (2015)

Jordan Knight chronology
Unfinished (2011)	Nick & Knight (2014)

Singles from Nick & Knight
- 1. "One More Time" Released: July 15, 2014

Nick & Knight is an eponymous collaborative album by American singers Nick Carter and Jordan Knight, under the collective stage name of Nick & Knight. The album was released on September 2, 2014. A promotional song, "Just The Two of Us", is available for download with a pre-order of the album. The album's lead single, "One More Time", was released alongside a music video on July 15, 2014. Carter and Knight's respective bands, the Backstreet Boys and New Kids on the Block, have previously collaborated on an album entitled NKOTBSB, and also went out on a joint tour between 2011 and 2012 as supergroup NKOTBSB.

== Background ==
In 2011 and 2012 Nick Carter and Jordan Knight performed with their respective bands, Backstreet Boys and New Kids on the Block as part of the NKOTBSB Tour. During the tour the idea of a collaboration between the two artists came up. Carter said how they explored the idea and eventually it turned into an entire album. According to Knight being part of a group "puts a lot of pressure on the creative process", while the collaboration gave them "a little more freedom to just explore and do something different than what would be expected."

== Reception ==
Jennifer Gerson of The Guardian said of the album; “Nick & Knight showcase a sad, strange take on a certain kind of masculinity, and thus the whole boyband genre: though pretty and well-choreographed, the duo are aggressive and desperate in their attempt to assert their own importance, and assure us that they’re not impotent.”

== Singles ==
- "One More Time" was released as the album's lead single on July 15, 2014.

== Track listing ==
No.	Title	Writer(s)	Producer(s)	Length
1.	"One More Time"	Jonathan Yip; Jeremy Reeves; Ray Romulus; Ray McCullough; James Young; Dan Keyes	Stereotypes; Johan "Jones" Wetterberg^{[a]}; Marcus Siskind^{[a]}	3:30
2.	"Nobody Better"	Jordan Omley; Isaiah Leavitt; Michael Mani	Mani; Omley	3:36
3.	"Switch"	Bruno Mars; Phillip Lawrence; Keith Harris	Harris; Alvin Garrett^{[a]}; Omley^{[a]}	3:31
4.	"Drive My Car"	Jordan Knight; Nick Carter; Jacob "J. Kash" Kasher Hindlin; Nate Campany; Jeff Halavacs	Halatrax; Wetterberg^{[a]}	3:51
5.	"Take Me Home"	Jared Lee; Mario Marchetti	Marchetti	4:17
6.	"Deja Vu"	Jeremy Skaller; Khaled Rohaim; Brandyn Burnette; Nicholas "Ras" Furlong	Skaller; Rohaim; Damon Sharpe^{[a]}; Anthony Kronfle^{[a]}; Wetterberg^{[a]}	3:14
7.	"If You Want It"	Carter; Knight; Emily Warren; Fancy Hagood; Halavacs	Halatrax; Wetterberg^{[a]}	3:23
8.	"Paper"	Andy Love; Chloe Angelides; Mikhail Beltran	Beltran; Love^{[a]}; Wetterberg^{[a]}	3:01
9.	"Just the Two of Us"	Lee; Justin Lucas; Jamil Chammas; Skaller	Skaller; Chammas; Lee^{[a]}; Wetterberg^{[a]}	3:07
10.	"Halfway There"	Louis Biancaniello; Omley	Biancaniello; Omley^{[a]}	3:58

Notes

- ^{^[a]} signifies a vocal producer

== Commercial performance ==
Nick & Knight debuted at number 24 on the US Billboard 200 with around 9,000 copies sold in its first week. In Canada, it debuted at number 14 on the Canadian Albums Chart.

== Charts ==
=== Weekly charts ===
Chart (2014)	Peak position
Canadian Albums (Billboard)	14
US Billboard 200	24

== Release history ==
Country	Release date	Format(s)
United Kingdom	1 September 2014	Digital download
United States	2 September 2014	Digital download
United States	2 September 2014	Compact disc
