= Get Over Me =

Song by Nick Carter featuring Avril Lavigne

from the album All American
- Released: November 27, 2015
- Recorded: 2015
- Genre: Pop-punk; pop rock
- Length: 3:30
- Label: Kaotic, Inc
- Songwriters: Nick Carter; Bryan Shackle; Dan Muckala; Thomas Kipp Williams
- Producers: Dan Muckala; Thomas Kipp Williams

Nick Carter chronology
"I Will Wait" (2015)	"Get Over Me" (2015)	"19 in 99" (2015)

Avril Lavigne chronology
Fly (2015)	Get Over Me (2015)	Head Above Water (2018)

"Get Over Me" is a song by American singer and songwriter Nick Carter featuring Canadian singer Avril Lavigne. It appears on Carter's third solo album All American as track 2.

== Background ==
In 2014, Avril Lavigne served as one of the Backstreet Boys opening acts during the second North American leg of their In A World Like This Tour, when they first collaborated.

On October 20, 2015, Nick Carter took over I Heart Radio Twitter account for a period where he answered fan questions. Among his tweets, he revealed that his upcoming album has a collaboration with Avril Lavigne called "Get Over Me." As he told I Heart Radio: "I talked to Avril about doing a collab together, and we became friends -- we were on tour together with the Backstreet Boys. She was into the idea, and she really liked it. She liked the song that I had written, and she put her vocals on the song, and it was really cool."
