= I Heart Nick Carter =

- Genre: Reality
- Starring: Nick Carter; Lauren Kitt-Carter
- Country of origin: United States
- Original language: English
- No. of seasons: 1
- No. of episodes: 8

Production
- Executive producer: Bischoff Hervey Entertainment
- Running time: 30 minutes

Original release
- Network: VH1
- Release: September 10 – October 29, 2014

I Heart Nick Carter is an American reality television series starring Nick Carter and his wife Lauren Kitt. The series premiered on September 10, 2014, on VH1.

== Episodes ==
No.	Title	Original release date	US viewers (millions)
1	"Can We Set a Date?"	September 10, 2014	N/A
2	"A Smart Business Move"	September 17, 2014	N/A
3	"Wanna Talk About the Guest List?"	September 24, 2014	N/A
4	"You're Marrying a Fat and Stupid Man"	October 1, 2014	N/A
5	"This Isn't the Nick Carter Show"	October 8, 2014	N/A
6	"Tour Life"	October 15, 2014	N/A
7	"Dude, I Love You"	October 22, 2014	N/A
8	"I Do"	October 29, 2014	N/A
