= I Will Wait (Hootie & the Blowfish song) =

1998 single by Hootie & the Blowfish

Single by Hootie & the Blowfish

from the album Musical Chairs
- Released: August 17, 1998
- Length: 4:15
- Label: Atlantic
- Songwriters: Mark Bryan; Dean Felber; Darius Rucker; Jim "Soni" Sonefeld
- Producer: Don Gehman

Hootie & the Blowfish singles chronology
"Sad Caper" (1996)	"I Will Wait" (1998)	"Only Lonely" (1999)

"I Will Wait" is a song by American rock group Hootie & the Blowfish. It was released in August 1998 as the lead single from their third studio album, Musical Chairs. In the United States, it peaked at number 18 on the Billboard Hot 100 Airplay chart and number three on the Billboard Adult Top 40. In Canada, the song reached number seven, making it the band's final top-10 hit there. The song's music video was directed by Ulf Buddensieck.

== Background and writing ==
Darius Rucker stated in an interview with Billboard that he wrote the song about his best friend's parents. The father was in the military and the mother was always waiting for him to get home.

== Charts ==
=== Weekly charts ===
Chart (1998)	Peak position
Canada Top Singles (RPM)	7
Canada Adult Contemporary (RPM)	12
Scottish Singles Sales (Official Charts)	42
UK Singles (Official Charts)	57
US Radio Songs (Billboard)	18
US Adult Alternative Airplay (Billboard)	8
US Adult Contemporary (Billboard)	28
US Adult Pop Airplay (Billboard)	3
US Pop Airplay (Billboard)	16

=== Year-end charts ===
Chart (1998)	Position
Canada Top Singles (RPM)	83
Canada Adult Contemporary (RPM)	74
US Adult Top 40 (Billboard)	30
US Mainstream Top 40 (Billboard)	74
US Triple-A (Billboard)	39

Chart (1999)	Position
US Adult Top 40 (Billboard)	73

== Release history ==
Region	Date	Format(s)	Label(s)	Ref(s).
United States	August 17–18, 1997	Modern rock; contemporary hit radio	Atantic	
Japan	October 10, 1998	CD	Atantic	
United Kingdom	October 26, 1998	CD; cassette	Atantic	
