= Skyway Theatre =

Entertainment venue in Minneapolis

- Interactive map of Skyway Theatre
- Address: 711 Hennepin Ave
- Location: Minneapolis, Minnesota, United States
- Coordinates: 44.9778°N 93.2771°W
- Owner: Private
- Seating type: General admission
- Capacity: Mainroom: 2,500; Studio B: 800; The Loft: 500; Bar Fly: 300; The Lyric: 450
- Type: Concert venue

Construction
- Opened: 1986
- Renovated: 2011

Website
- skywaytheatre.com

The Skyway Theatre is a historic entertainment venue located in downtown Minneapolis, Minnesota, United States. Originally opened in 1986 as a movie theater, it has since evolved into a prominent multi-stage live performance venue. Since 2011, Skyway Theatre has served as a key player in the local and national live music scene, offering a space for concerts, electronic dance music (EDM) events, comedy shows, and other forms of entertainment. The venue has become a notable destination for both established and emerging artists across various genres.

== History ==
The Skyway Theatre building was originally designed as a cinema complex, known as the Skyway 6 Theatres, part of the downtown Minneapolis Skyway System. It opened in 1986, offering six screens within the bustling downtown area. The cinema remained in operation for nearly two decades before closing its doors in the mid-2000s due to changes in the movie industry and declining attendance.

In 2011, the abandoned cinema was purchased and transformed into the current iteration of Skyway Theatre. The new owners saw an opportunity to repurpose the theater into a live performance space, taking advantage of the building's spacious interior and central location in the heart of downtown Minneapolis. In 2013 Live Nation Entertainment took over booking.

== Venue layout ==
Skyway Theatre is composed of several distinct stages and performance areas, each catering to different types of events and audiences. This allows the venue to host everything from large-scale concerts to more intimate shows.

=== Skyway Theatre Mainroom ===
The Mainroom is the largest venue space within the complex, with a capacity of approximately 2,500 people. It serves as the primary concert hall for major performances, hosting artists from a range of genres including electronic, hip hop, rock, and metal. The Mainroom features a general admission area with standing-room-only capacity, multiple bars, and state-of-the-art sound and lighting systems, creating an immersive experience for concertgoers.

Over the years, the Mainroom has been the stage for EDM acts such as Excision, Zeds Dead, and Illenium. It has also welcomed hip-hop performers like Tech N9ne and Run the Jewels, establishing a reputation as an inclusive venue.

=== The Loft ===
The Loft is a smaller, more intimate venue located within the Skyway complex, with a capacity of around 500 people. It is often used for smaller concerts, local showcases, and themed club nights, making it a hub for up-and-coming EDM artists and local performers. The intimate layout of The Loft, combined with excellent sightlines, creates an environment where audience members feel closely connected to the performers.

=== Bar Fly ===
Bar Fly is another venue within the Skyway Theatre complex, offering a nightclub experience. With a capacity of 300 people, Bar Fly is geared toward electronic and DJ events, featuring a dance floor, VIP areas, and a full-service bar. The space often hosts themed nights and private events, creating a lively, party-like atmosphere.

=== Studio B ===
Studio B is a mid-sized performance space within Skyway Theatre, with a capacity of 800 people. Known for its high-quality sound system and lighting, Studio B is a popular venue for EDM shows, stand-up comedy, and special events. It provides a versatile space for mid-sized events, often acting as a bridge between the more intimate Loft and the larger Mainroom.

=== The Lyric ===
The Lyric is the newest addition to the Skyway Theatre complex, offering a 450-capacity space. With a lounge-like atmosphere, The Lyric is designed for intimate concerts, acoustic performances, and indie acts.

== Notable performances ==
Skyway Theatre has hosted a wide variety of well-known artists and performances over the years. The venue is particularly well-known in the electronic dance music (EDM) scene, having featured renowned DJs and producers such as Excision, Zeds Dead, Illenium, and Seven Lions. Skyway has also attracted significant hip-hop acts like Tech N9ne, Run the Jewels, and A$AP Ferg, making it a key venue for hip-hop fans in the Minneapolis area.

Beyond music, the Skyway Theatre also regularly hosts comedy events, including performances by local comedians and national touring acts. These shows often take place in Studio B or The Lyric, adding to the venue's diverse programming.

== Renovations and changes ==
Since its conversion from a movie theater into a live performance venue, Skyway Theatre has undergone several major renovations. The most significant renovation took place in 2011, during the initial transformation, when the owners upgraded the sound systems, lighting, and stage setups in order to better accommodate live music performances. Additional upgrades were made in subsequent years, including expanded bar areas, VIP sections, and backstage amenities to cater to performers.

These renovations helped cement Skyway Theatre as a premier destination for concerts in downtown Minneapolis. The venue's ability to accommodate various crowd sizes and genres, along with its prime location near other Minneapolis entertainment hotspots, has helped it remain a key player in the city's live entertainment scene.

== Address and accessibility ==
Skyway Theatre is located at 711 Hennepin Avenue, Minneapolis, MN 55403, in the heart of downtown. The venue is easily accessible via public transportation, with nearby light rail and bus stops. Several parking garages are also within walking distance. As part of the Minneapolis Skyway System, the venue is connected to other downtown buildings, providing convenient access for visitors in all weather conditions.
