= Tonies =

Luxembourgish toy production company

Tonies SE
- Type: SE
- Industry: Toys
- Founded: 2013
- Headquarters: Luxembourg City, Luxembourg
- Key people: Tobias Wann, Jan Middelhoff
- Products: Toniebox, Tonies, Accessories
- Revenue: €600M (2024)
- Number of employees: 400 (2022)

Tonies SE (stylized: tonies) is a toy production company based in Düsseldorf and Luxembourg City. The company's main product is the Toniebox, a cube-shaped digital audio device designed for children.

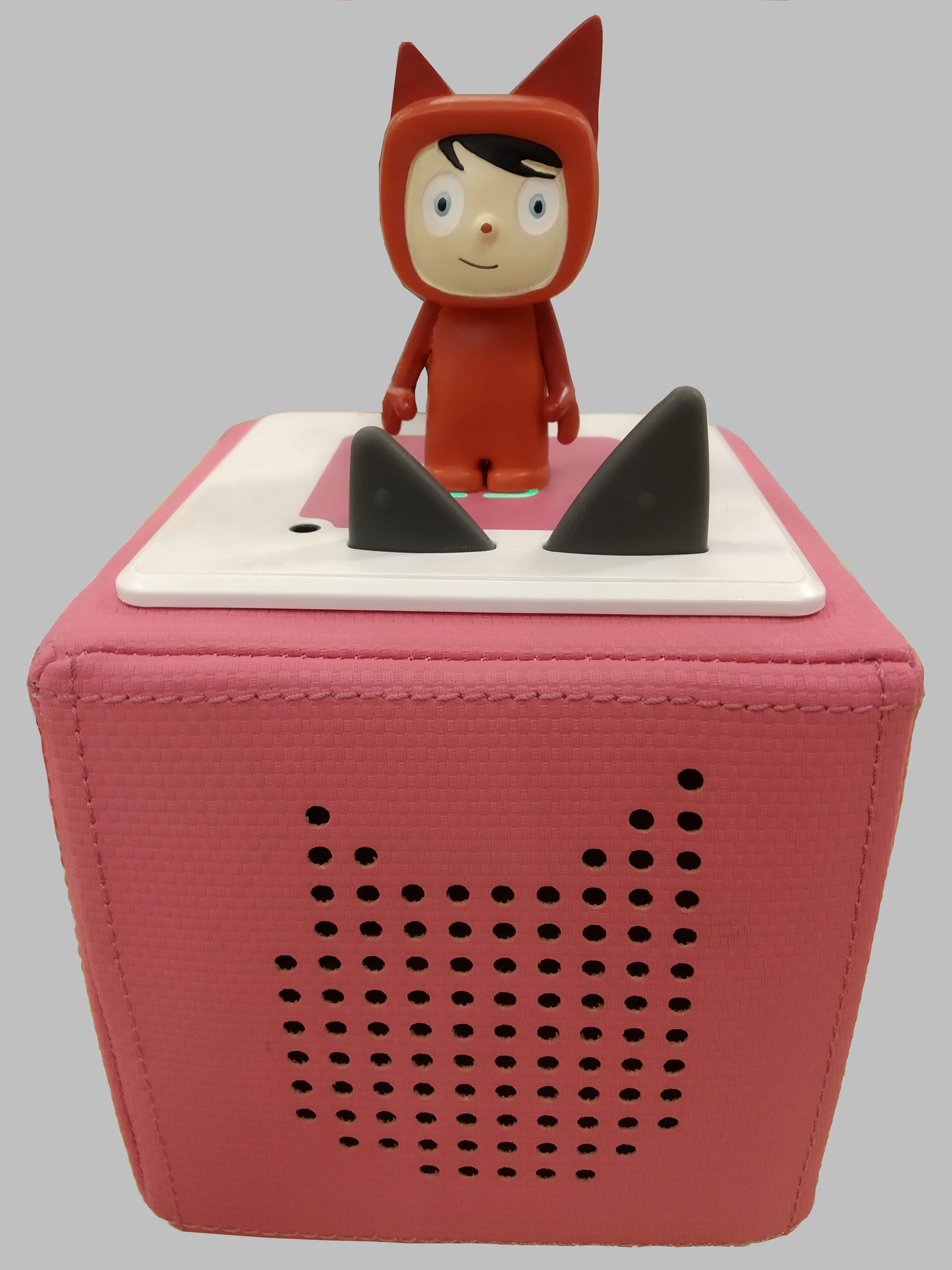
Toniebox with toy figure

== History ==
=== Founding and beginnings ===
The concept of Tonies originated in 2013, when the prospective founder, Patric Faßbender, had the idea of developing a digital audio system for children in order to avoid scratched CDs and provide screen-free entertainment. Marcus Stahl became a business partner and took over the technical development of the Toniebox. The development of the speaker cube received backing from investors within their social network. Subsequently, Boxine GmbH was founded by Faßbender and Stahl in 2013 and garnered further support from investors.

In the summer of 2016, product development was completed, and Boxine launched the first Toniebox and 14 Tonies (audio play characters). Boxine received its first licence from WDR.

=== Expansion and awards in German-speaking European countries ===
Up until 2017, the founders, Faßbender and Stahl, had to actively approach publishers to acquire licences. From 2018 onwards, publishers and large entertainment companies offered licences on their own initiative, and the company went on to produce Tonies characters such as Bibi and Tina, Peppa Pig, PAW Patrol, Pippi Longstocking, Benjamin the Elephant, characters from the Three Investigators series, and Sesame Street. Sales increased every year, with a temporary disruption of deliveries in 2017 and 2018 due to high demand, resulting in the depletion of boxes and figures. While the company sold 30,000 boxes in the first quarter of 2016, this number increased to 148,000 units in 2017. Around 600,000 boxes were sold in 2018 and 2.7 million figures were sold until 2018. Between 2017 and 2020, Boxine's revenue exceeded €100 million. In the German-speaking areas, Tonies increased its sales by 4.6 percent compared to the previous year, amounting to €158.3 million in 2022.

In 2016, Toniebox was awarded the Red Dot Design Award, followed by the German Design Award and the iF Product Design Award in 2017. In 2019, the company received the German Founder Award in the category Rising Star.

IG Hörbuch, an association of audiobook publishers and retailers within the German Book Trade Association, awarded their "Audiobook Person of the Year" award in 2020 to the two inventors of the Toniebox.

In January 2019, Boxine introduced the Tonie Clip, a new technology enabling the connection of existing toys to the Toniebox. In the same month, Playmobil became the first cooperation partner, incorporating the Tonie Clip into their radio play series, Playmos. Also in January 2019, the company announced its collaboration with Disney.

In September 2019, the industrial holding Armira, Santo Venture Capital, and Zalando founder Robert Gentz invested in Boxine. A spokeswoman for Boxine confirmed a partial change in shareholders but not a complete sale. According to the spokeswoman, the founders, Faßbender and Stahl, remained in the company and retained their shares. Only the strategic investors who were involved in Boxine before the shareholder change relinquished their shares.

=== International expansion ===
Since October 2018, the company has been selling the Toniebox in Great Britain and Ireland. Since 2020, the Toniebox has also been available in the United States. In September 2021, the company started selling Tonies in France.

Since September 2022, Tonies has been working with Jebsen Group in Hong Kong, which sells English Tonies at Toys "R" Us and J Select, the Jebsen Group's retail store. Toys "R" Us and J Select distribute the Tonies to other regional retail partners. Since 2023, the company has also been active in the Canadian market.

=== Initial public offering ===
In June 2021, Boxine announced its intention to go public with a Spac. At the end of August 2021, it was announced that Boxine would be listed on the Frankfurt Stock Exchange through a merger with the shell corporation 468 SPAC I SE. The management of the company remained with the company's two founders, both of whom retained their shares in the merged company. The merger was expected to generate gross proceeds of €400 million and valued the company at €870 million. The company was listed on the Frankfurt Stock Exchange on 29 November 2021, and subsequently changed its name to Tonies SE. Tonies generated proceeds of €100 million with the IPO, and through a subsequent capital increase, the company generated additional capital of €60 million.

=== More recent developments ===
In November 2022, Tonies produced a Tonies commercial with Disney, which features the Toniebox and Disney characters from the films Frozen, Moana, and The Lion King.

In May 2023, the group introduced a story generator based on ChatGPT, involving 1,000 households in Great Britain. Through the Mytonies app, parents and children were able to access a child-friendly version of ChatGPT and use artificial intelligence to invent new short stories. In the same month, the brand Leibniz-Keks launched a limited-edition pack of biscuits, containing 8 Creative Tonies in the design of biscuits. Additionally, Tonies began a collaboration with Warner Bros., expanding its range of Tonies figures to include characters such as Batman and Wonder Woman.

On 1 January 2024, the founders Faßbender and Stahl left the operative business of Tonies, and Tobias Wann became managing director.

In July 2025, the company produced a Ms. Rachel figure, which sold out almost immediately.

== Company structure ==
Tonies conducts its business from six locations in Germany and one location each in the UK, US and France. Tonies' own subsidiaries sell to customers in the US and France. Sales for the United Kingdom and the Republic of Ireland are combined in a British subsidiary.

=== Shareholder structure ===
- Public Float – 40.86%
- Armira Partners GmbH & Co. KG – 27.54%
- Treasury Shares – 11.04%
- Höllenhunde GmbH – 8.25%
- 468 Spac Sponsors GmbH & Co. KG – 6.84%
- Santo Ella Co-Invest GmbH & Co. KG – 5.48%

(2 January 2024)

== Products ==
The Toniebox is a padded cube with a length of twelve centimetres. Audio playback starts when a figurine is placed on top of the box; when the figure is removed, playback pauses. The Toniebox does not contain any controls; the ears of the box serve as volume controls. After the initial installation, the content is permanently stored in the box and can be accessed offline. The storage capacity of the Toniebox is 400 hours. In addition to the Tonies figures and the Toniebox, the company offers so-called Creative Tonies, which can be filled with up to 90 minutes of custom content. The content of the Creative Tonies is not recorded directly via the Toniebox but can be loaded onto the Tonies via a smartphone app. The company maintains a Tonie Lab in which it develops its own audiobooks such as the Secret Science Club series, which introduces children to science.

The hard rubber Tonies figures are developed, designed, and tested in a development centre in Schwäbisch Gmünd, while they are manufactured in Tunisia and China. The Toniebox itself is produced in China, Hungary and Vietnam.
