= Dancing with the Stars (American TV series) season 21 =

Dancing with the Stars
- Season 21
- Promotional poster, featuring pro dancers Peta Murgatroyd and Artem Chigvintsev
- Hosted by: Tom Bergeron; Erin Andrews
- Judges: Carrie Ann Inaba; Bruno Tonioli; Julianne Hough
- Celebrity winner: Bindi Irwin
- Professional winner: Derek Hough
- No. of episodes: 14

Release
- Original network: ABC
- Original release: September 14 – November 24, 2015

Season chronology
- ← Previous; Season 20 Next → Season 22

Season twenty-one of the American television competition series Dancing with the Stars premiered on September 14, 2015.

On November 24, conservationist Bindi Irwin and Derek Hough were crowned the champions, while Backstreet Boys singer Nick Carter and Sharna Burgess finished in second place, and soldier (and hero of the 2015 Thalys train attack) Alek Skarlatos and Lindsay Arnold finished in third.

== Cast ==
=== Couples ===
This season featured thirteen celebrity contestants. On August 19, 2015, nine professional dancers were revealed during Good Morning America. Returning pros included Karina Smirnoff, Anna Trebunskaya, and Louis van Amstel. Additionally, Lindsay Arnold also returned after spending four seasons as part of the troupe. While Peta Murgatroyd was originally announced as a professional, she was sidelined for the season by an ankle injury; Allison Holker replaced her spot in the cast. Bindi Irwin was the first celebrity revealed on August 24 on Good Morning America; other celebrities were revealed at different dates through different media. The full cast of celebrities and professional dancers was revealed on September 2, 2015.

| Celebrity | Notability | Professional partner | Status | Ref. |
|---|---|---|---|---|
| Chaka Khan | Funk & R&B singer | Keo Motsepe | Eliminated 1st on September 21, 2015 | |
| Victor Espinoza | Jockey | Karina Smirnoff | Eliminated 2nd on September 22, 2015 | |
| Kim Zolciak-Biermann | Reality television personality | Tony Dovolani | Withdrew on September 28, 2015 | |
| Gary Busey | Film actor | Anna Trebunskaya | Eliminated 3rd on October 5, 2015 | |
| Paula Deen | Celebrity chef & businesswoman | Louis van Amstel; Mark Ballas (Week 5) | Eliminated 4th on October 19, 2015 | |
| Hayes Grier | Vine & social media personality | Emma Slater; Allison Holker (Week 5) | Eliminated 5th on October 26, 2015 | |
| Andy Grammer | Singer-songwriter | Allison Holker; Sharna Burgess (Week 5) | Eliminated 6th on November 2, 2015 | |
| Alexa PenaVega | Film & television actress | Mark Ballas; Derek Hough (Week 5) | Eliminated 7th on November 9, 2015 | |
| Tamar Braxton | R&B singer & reality television personality | Valentin Chmerkovskiy; Louis van Amstel (Week 5) | Withdrew on November 11, 2015 | |
| Carlos PenaVega | Big Time Rush singer & actor | Witney Carson; Lindsay Arnold (Week 5) | Eliminated 8th on November 23, 2015 | |
| Alek Skarlatos | Legion of Honor recipient & soldier | Lindsay Arnold; Emma Slater (Week 5) | Third place on November 24, 2015 | |
| Nick Carter | Backstreet Boys singer | Sharna Burgess; Witney Carson (Week 5) | Runners-up on November 24, 2015 | |
| Bindi Irwin | Wildlife conservationist & actress | Derek Hough; Valentin Chmerkovskiy (Week 5) | Winners on November 24, 2015 | |

=== Hosts and judges ===
Tom Bergeron and Erin Andrews returned as hosts, while judges Carrie Ann Inaba, Julianne Hough, and Bruno Tonioli all returned this season. After twenty seasons, Len Goodman did not return this season as a judge; in a video message during the finale, Goodman announced that he would return for season 22. Season 19 champion Alfonso Ribeiro filled in for Tom Bergeron on October 5, 2015, while Bergeron attended to his ailing father. Leah Remini also filled in as co-host on October 19 and October 26 while Erin Andrews covered the 2015 World Series. There were three guest judges during the course of the season. Season 19 champion Alfonso Ribeiro was a guest judge for week 3. Former pro dancer and season 18 champion Maksim Chmerkovskiy joined the judging panel for week 5. The following week, Olivia Newton-John appeared as a guest judge as well.

=== Dance troupe ===
The dance troupe consisted of returning members Jenna Johnson, Brittany Cherry, Sasha Farber, and Alan Bersten, and new troupe member Hayley Erbert.

== Episodes ==
| No. overall | No. in season | Title | Rating (18–49) | Original release date | U.S. viewers (millions) |
|---|---|---|---|---|---|
| 360 | 1 | "Premiere" | 2.14 | September 14, 2015 | 13.21 |
| 361 | 2 | "First Dances" (Clip Show)" | 1.10 | September 15, 2015 | 5.77 |
| 362 | 3 | "Hometown Glory: Night 1" | 1.77 | September 21, 2015 | 11.46 |
| 363 | 4 | "Hometown Glory: Night 2" | 1.50 | September 22, 2015 | 9.58 |
| 364 | 5 | "TV Night" | 1.63 | September 28, 2015 | 11.04 |
| 365 | 6 | "Most Memorable Year" | 1.75 | October 5, 2015 | 11.82 |
| 366 | 7 | "Switch-Up Night" | 1.67 | October 12, 2015 | 11.64 |
| 367 | 8 | "Famous Dances Night" | 1.93 | October 19, 2015 | 12.50 |
| 368 | 9 | "Halloween Night" | 1.80 | October 26, 2015 | 11.86 |
| 369 | 10 | "Icons Night" | 1.85 | November 2, 2015 | 12.09 |
| 370 | 11 | "Showstoppers Night" | 2.00 | November 9, 2015 | 12.63 |
| 371 | 12 | "Semifinals" | 1.80 | November 16, 2015 | 12.35 |
| 372 | 13 | "Finals: Night 1" | 2.11 | November 23, 2015 | 13.29 |
| 373 | 14 | "Finals: Night 2" | 2.37 | November 24, 2015 | 13.49 |

== Scoring chart ==
The highest score each week is indicated in bold green with a dagger (†), while the lowest score each week is indicated in italicized red with a double-dagger (‡).

Color key:

Winners
Runners-up
Third place
Withdrew from competition
Eliminated

Dancing with the Stars (season 21) - Weekly scores
| Couple | Pl. | Week | | | | | | | | | | | | | |
| Couple | Pl. | 1 | 2 | | 3 (Note: The couples were scored on a 40-point scale due to the presence of a guest judge.) | 4 | 5 | 6 | 5+6 | 7 | 8 | 9 | 10 | 11 | |
| Couple | Pl. | 1 | Night 1 | Night 2 | 3 | 4 | 5 | 6 | 5+6 | 7 | 8 | 9 | 10 | Night 1 | Night 2 |
|---|---|---|---|---|---|---|---|---|---|---|---|---|---|---|---|
| Bindi & Derek | 1st | **24**† | **25**† | 23 | 32 | **28**† | 37 | **40**† | **77**† | 30+28=**58**† | 28 | 30+30=**60**† | 27+3+30=**60**† | 30+30=**60**† | +30=**90**† (Note: This couple finished in first place.) |
| Nick & Sharna | 2nd | **24**† | 21 | 24 | **36**† | 27 | 35 | 39 | 74 | 24+30=54 | 30+3=**33**† | 28+27=55 | 24+30=54‡ | 30+30=**60**† | +30=**90**† (Note: This couple finished in second place.) |
| Alek & Lindsay | 3rd | 22 | 23 | 22 | 33 | 24 | 29 | 30 | 59 | 25+28=53‡ | 25 | 24+24=48‡ | 30+27=57 | 27+30=57‡ | +27=84‡ (Note: This couple finished in third place.) |
| Carlos & Witney | 4th | 23 | 24 | 21 | 31 | 25 | 39 | 38 | **77**† | 28+28=56 | 27+2=29 | 27+24=51 | 28+3+29=**60**† | 30+30=**60**† (Note: This couple was eliminated.) | |
| Tamar & Val | 5th | 23 | 24 | **25**† | 33 | 27 | 29 | **40**† | 69 | 24+30=54 | 28 | 22+27=49 | (Note: This couple withdrew from the competition.) | | |
| Alexa & Mark | 6th | 22 | 24 | 22 | **36**† | 21 | **40**† | 30 | 70 | 27+28=55 | 25+2=27 | 30+30=**60**† | | | |
| Andy & Allison | 7th | 21 | 21 | 23 | 29 | 23 | 36 | **40**† | 76 | 26+30=56 | 22+2=24‡ | | | | |
| Hayes & Emma | 8th | 21 | 22 | 23 | 30 | 27 | 30 | 32 | 62 | 26+30=56 | | | | | |
| Paula & Louis | 9th | 15 | 19 | 18 | 20‡ | 18 | 26‡ | 24‡ | 50‡ | | | | | | |
| Gary & Anna | 10th | 15 | 18 | 15‡ | 25 | 16‡ | | | | | | | | | |
| Kim & Tony | 11th | 12‡ | 19 | 18 | | | | | | | | | | | |
| Victor & Karina | 12th | 15 | 17 | 20 | | | | | | | | | | | |
| Chaka & Keo | 13th | 13 | 15‡ | | | | | | | | | | | | |

== Weekly scores ==
Individual judges' scores in the charts below (given in parentheses) are listed in this order from left to right: Carrie Ann Inaba, Julianne Hough, Bruno Tonioli.

=== Week 1: Premiere Night ===
Couples are listed in the order they performed.

| Couple | Scores | Dance | Music |
|---|---|---|---|
| Victor & Karina | 15 (5, 5, 5) | Salsa | "G.D.F.R." — Flo Rida, feat. Sage the Gemini & Lookas |
| Tamar & Val | 23 (8, 7, 8) | Quickstep | "Do Your Thing" — Basement Jaxx |
| Chaka & Keo | 13 (5, 4, 4) | Cha-cha-cha | "I Feel for You" — Chaka Khan |
| Hayes & Emma | 21 (7, 7, 7) | Cha-cha-cha | "Cheerleader" — OMI |
| Andy & Allison | 21 (7, 7, 7) | Foxtrot | "Marvin Gaye" — Charlie Puth, feat. Meghan Trainor |
| Paula & Louis | 15 (5, 5, 5) | Quickstep | "Hey, Good Lookin'" — Carol Welsman |
| Carlos & Witney | 23 (8, 8, 7) | Jive | "I Got You (I Feel Good)" — James Brown |
| Alexa & Mark | 22 (7, 7, 8) | Jive | "Whistle (While You Work It)" — Katy Tiz |
| Kim & Tony | 12 (4, 4, 4) | Salsa | "Hey Mama" — David Guetta, feat. Nicki Minaj, Bebe Rexha & Afrojack |
| Bindi & Derek | 24 (8, 8, 8) | Jive | "Crocodile Rock" — Elton John |
| Gary & Anna | 15 (5, 5, 5) | Cha-cha-cha | "Dancing in the Street" — David Bowie & Mick Jagger |
| Alek & Lindsay | 22 (8, 7, 7) | Foxtrot | "Ten Feet Tall" — Afrojack, feat. Wrabel |
| Nick & Sharna | 24 (8, 8, 8) | Cha-cha-cha | "I Don't Like It, I Love It" — Flo Rida, feat. Robin Thicke & Verdine White |

=== Week 2: Hometown Glory Week ===
The couples had to prepare two new dances to be performed on two consecutive nights. On Monday, the couples performed routines that celebrated the hometowns of the celebrities, with one couple being eliminated at the end of the show. On Tuesday, the remaining couples performed routines that celebrated the hometowns of the pro partners, with another couple being eliminated. Couples are listed in the order they performed.

Night 1

| Couple | Scores | Dance | Music | Result |
|---|---|---|---|---|
| Nick & Sharna | 21 (7, 7, 7) | Jive | "Boogie Woogie Bugle Boy" — The Andrews Sisters | Safe |
| Paula & Louis | 19 (7, 6, 6) | Rumba | "Midnight Train to Georgia" — Gladys Knight & the Pips | Safe |
| Hayes & Emma | 22 (8, 7, 7) | Foxtrot | "This Is How We Roll" — Florida Georgia Line, feat. Luke Bryan | Safe |
| Chaka & Keo | 15 (5, 5, 5) | Foxtrot | "Chicago (That Toddlin' Town)" — Frank Sinatra | Eliminated |
| Andy & Allison | 21 (7, 7, 7) | Jive | "Only the Good Die Young" — Billy Joel | Safe |
| Kim & Tony | 19 (7, 6, 6) | Quickstep | "Queen Bee" — Rochelle Diamante | Safe |
| Alek & Lindsay | 23 (8, 7, 8) | Jazz | "Don't Stop Believin'" — Journey | Safe |
| Alexa & Mark | 24 (8, 8, 8) | Salsa | "Robi-Rob's Boriqua Anthem" — C+C Music Factory feat. El General | Safe |
| Victor & Karina | 17 (6, 5, 6) | Jive | "La Bamba" — Ritchie Valens | Safe |
| Tamar & Val | 24 (8, 8, 8) | Cha-cha-cha | "We Are Family" — Sister Sledge | Safe |
| Gary & Anna | 18 (6, 6, 6) | Foxtrot | "Wouldn't It Be Nice" — The Beach Boys | Safe |
| Carlos & Witney | 24 (8, 8, 8) | Foxtrot | "Home" — Blake Shelton | Safe |
| Bindi & Derek | 25 (9, 8, 8) | Tango | "You Shook Me All Night Long" — AC/DC | Safe |

Night 2

| Couple | Scores | Dance | Music | Result |
|---|---|---|---|---|
| Hayes & Emma | 23 (8, 7, 8) | Quickstep | "Are You Gonna Be My Girl" — Jet | Safe |
| Carlos & Witney | 21 (7, 7, 7) | Cha-cha-cha | "Hound Dog" — Big Mama Thornton | Safe |
| Gary & Anna | 15 (5, 5, 5) | Paso doble | "1812 Overture" — Pyotr Ilyich Tchaikovsky | Safe |
| Andy & Allison | 23 (8, 8, 7) | Contemporary | "Heaven Is a Place on Earth" — Belinda Carlisle | Safe |
| Alexa & Mark | 22 (7, 7, 8) | Rumba | "Somewhere in Time" — John Barry | Safe |
| Paula & Louis | 18 (6, 6, 6) | Tango | "Get Ready" — The Temptations | Safe |
| Bindi & Derek | 23 (7, 8, 8) | Waltz | "Only a Man" — Jonny Lang | Safe |
| Kim & Tony | 18 (6, 6, 6) | Foxtrot | "Come Home" — OneRepublic, feat. Sara Bareilles | Safe |
| Alek & Lindsay | 22 (7, 7, 8) | Quickstep | "American Girl" — Elle King | Safe |
| Victor & Karina | 20 (7, 6, 7) | Rumba | "Girl on Fire" — Alicia Keys | Eliminated |
| Nick & Sharna | 24 (8, 8, 8) | Foxtrot | "Coming Home, Pt. II" — Skylar Grey | Safe |
| Tamar & Val | 25 (8, 8, 9) | Charleston | "Living in New York City" — Robin Thicke | Safe |

=== Week 3: TV Night ===
Individual judges scores in the chart below (given in parentheses) are listed in this order from left to right: Carrie Ann Inaba, Alfonso Ribeiro, Julianne Hough, Bruno Tonioli.

The couples performed one unlearned dance to famous television theme songs. Couples are listed in the order they performed.

After suffering a mini-stroke, Kim Zolciak-Biermann was unable to attend the dress rehearsal and live show, and had to withdraw from the competition. Her partner, Tony Dovolani, performed their samba routine during the live show with Jenna Johnson. There was no additional elimination.

| Couple | Scores | Dance | Music | TV show |
|---|---|---|---|---|
| Carlos & Witney | 31 (7, 8, 8, 8) | Jazz | "Thank You for Being a Friend" — Cynthia Fee | The Golden Girls |
| Paula & Louis | 20 (5, 5, 5, 5) | Samba | "The Ballad of Gilligan's Isle" — The Eligibles | Gilligan's Island |
| Tamar & Val | 33 (8, 9, 8, 8) | Tango | "A Beautiful Mine" — RJD2 | Mad Men |
| Alexa & Mark | 36 (9, 9, 9, 9) | Jazz | "Breaking Bad Theme" — Dave Porter | Breaking Bad |
| Andy & Allison | 29 (7, 7, 8, 7) | Quickstep | "Bandstand Boogie" — Larry Elgart | American Bandstand |
| Gary & Anna | 25 (6, 7, 6, 6) | Tango | "The Addams Family Theme" — Vic Mizzy | The Addams Family |
| Alek & Lindsay | 33 (8, 8, 9, 8) | Tango | "Bad Things" — Jace Everett | True Blood |
| Bindi & Derek | 32 (8, 8, 8, 8) | Quickstep | "Movin' on Up" — Ja'net Dubois | The Jeffersons |
| Nick & Sharna | 36 (9, 9, 9, 9) | Viennese waltz | "Did I Make the Most of Loving You?" — Mary-Jess Leaverland | Downton Abbey |
| Hayes & Emma | 30 (7, 8, 7, 8) | Jive | "Teenage Mutant Ninja Turtles Theme" — Chuck Lorre & Dennis C. Brown | Teenage Mutant Ninja Turtles |

=== Week 4: Most Memorable Year Night ===
The couples performed one unlearned dance to celebrate the most memorable year of their lives. Couples are listed in the order they performed.

For the first time in the history of the program, Tom Bergeron did not appear as a host; he was absent to be with his ailing father. Alfonso Ribeiro filled in as co-host.

| Couple | Scores | Dance | Music | Result |
|---|---|---|---|---|
| Alexa & Mark | 21 (7, 7, 7) | Foxtrot | "Mama Said" — The Shirelles | Safe |
| Gary & Anna | 16 (5, 6, 5) | Jazz | "That'll Be the Day" — Buddy Holly | Eliminated |
| Tamar & Val | 27 (9, 9, 9) | Rumba | "King" — Tamar Braxton | Safe |
| Hayes & Emma | 27 (9, 9, 9) | Contemporary | "Stitches" — Shawn Mendes | Safe |
| Alek & Lindsay | 24 (8, 8, 8) | Paso doble | "Wake Me Up" — Avicii | Safe |
| Nick & Sharna | 27 (9, 9, 9) | Jazz | "Everybody (Backstreet's Back)" — Backstreet Boys | Safe |
| Carlos & Witney | 25 (9, 8, 8) | Waltz | "Amazing Grace" — Ray Chew | Safe |
| Paula & Louis | 18 (6, 6, 6) | Cha-cha-cha | "Respect" — Aretha Franklin | Safe |
| Andy & Allison | 23 (7, 8, 8) | Cha-cha-cha | "Good to Be Alive (Hallelujah)" — Andy Grammer | Safe |
| Bindi & Derek | 28 (9, 9, 10) | Contemporary | "Every Breath You Take" — Aaron Krause, feat. Liza Anne | Safe |

=== Week 5: Switch-Up Night ===
Individual judges scores in the chart below (given in parentheses) are listed in this order from left to right: Carrie Ann Inaba, Julianne Hough, Maksim Chmerkovskiy, Bruno Tonioli.

The couples performed one unlearned dance with a different partner selected by the general public. Couples are listed in the order they performed. Due to the nature of the week, no elimination took place at the end of the night.

| Couple | Scores | Dance | Music |
|---|---|---|---|
| Tamar & Louis | 29 (7, 7, 8, 7) | Samba | "End of Time" — Beyoncé |
| Hayes & Allison | 30 (8, 8, 7, 7) | Viennese waltz | "Like I'm Gonna Lose You" — Meghan Trainor, feat. John Legend |
| Paula & Mark | 26 (7, 7, 6, 6) | Jive | "Shake" — Otis Redding |
| Alek & Emma | 29 (8, 7, 7, 7) | Rumba | "Let It Go" — James Bay |
| Bindi & Val | 37 (9, 9, 10, 9) | Cha-cha-cha | "Hold My Hand" — Jess Glynne |
| Carlos & Lindsay | 39 (10, 10, 9, 10) | Quickstep | "Bossa Nova Baby" — Elvis Presley |
| Alexa & Derek | 40 (10, 10, 10, 10) | Tango | "Pompeii" — Bastille |
| Andy & Sharna | 36 (9, 9, 9, 9) | Argentine tango | "Can't Feel My Face" — The Weeknd |
| Nick & Witney | 35 (9, 9, 8, 9) | Paso doble | "Don't Look Down" — Martin Garrix, feat. Usher |

=== Week 6: Famous Dances Night ===
Individual judges scores in the chart below (given in parentheses) are listed in this order from left to right: Carrie Ann Inaba, Julianne Hough, Olivia Newton-John, Bruno Tonioli.

The couples performed one unlearned dance that paid tribute to iconic dance performances from films and music videos. Leah Remini filled in for Erin Andrews.

| Couple | Scores | Dance | Music | Result |
|---|---|---|---|---|
| Hayes & Emma | 32 (8, 8, 8, 8) | Jazz | "You're the One That I Want" — John Travolta & Olivia Newton-John | Safe |
| Andy & Allison | 40 (10, 10, 10, 10) | Jazz | "Good Morning" — Debbie Reynolds, Gene Kelly & Donald O'Connor | Safe |
| Alexa & Mark | 30 (8, 7, 7, 8) | Cha-cha-cha | "I'm a Slave 4 U" — Britney Spears | Safe |
| Bindi & Derek | 40 (10, 10, 10, 10) | Rumba | "(I've Had) The Time of My Life" — Bill Medley & Jennifer Warnes | Safe |
| Paula & Louis | 24 (6, 6, 6, 6) | Jazz | "Vogue" — Madonna | Eliminated |
| Carlos & Witney | 38 (10, 9, 9, 10) | Rumba | "Pony" — Ginuwine | Safe |
| Nick & Sharna | 39 (9, 10, 10, 10) | Samba | "You Should Be Dancing" — Bee Gees | Safe |
| Alek & Lindsay | 30 (8, 8, 7, 7) | Jive | "Jailhouse Rock" — Elvis Presley | Safe |
| Tamar & Val | 40 (10, 10, 10, 10) | Jazz | "Rhythm Nation" — Janet Jackson | Safe |

=== Week 7: Halloween Night ===
Couples performed one unlearned dance and a team dance to Halloween-themed songs. Couples are listed in the order they performed.

Leah Remini again filled in for Erin Andrews.

| Couple | Scores | Dance | Music | Result |
|---|---|---|---|---|
| Nick & Sharna | 24 (8, 8, 8) | Argentine tango | "Bring Me to Life" — Evanescence, feat. Paul McCoy | Safe |
| Hayes & Emma | 26 (8, 9, 9) | Waltz | "Once Upon a Dream" — Lana Del Rey | Eliminated |
| Alexa & Mark | 27 (9, 9, 9) | Paso doble | "Hora Zero" — Rodrigo y Gabriela | Safe |
| Tamar & Val | 24 (8, 8, 8) | Foxtrot | "People Are Strange" — The Doors | Safe |
| Andy & Allison | 26 (9, 9, 8) | Paso doble | "The Beautiful People" — Marilyn Manson | Safe |
| Bindi & Derek | 30 (10, 10, 10) | Argentine tango | "Cry Little Sister" — Gerard McMann | Safe |
| Alek & Lindsay | 25 (9, 8, 8) | Viennese waltz | "Haunted" — Beyoncé | Safe |
| Carlos & Witney | 28 (9, 10, 9) | Paso doble | "O Fortuna" — Carl Orff | Safe |
| Andy & Allison Hayes & Emma Nick & Sharna Tamar & Val | 30 (10, 10, 10) | Freestyle (Team Nightmare) | "This Is Halloween" — Danny Elfman | |
| Alek & Lindsay Alexa & Mark Bindi & Derek Carlos & Witney | 28 (9, 10, 9) | Freestyle (Team Who You Gonna Call?) | "Ghostbusters" — Ray Parker Jr. | |

=== Week 8: Icons Night ===
Couples performed one unlearned dance that paid tribute to a personal icon of the celebrity; the couple with the highest score earned immunity from elimination, while the rest of the couples participated in dance-offs for extra points. For each dance-off, the couple with the highest score picked the opponent against whom they wanted to dance; the chosen opponent was allowed to pick the dance style (cha-cha-cha, jive, or samba). The winner of each dance-off earned three bonus points. Nick and Sharna received a three-point bonus for winning immunity. Couples are listed in the order they performed.

| Couple | Scores | Dance | Music | Icon | Result |
|---|---|---|---|---|---|
| Carlos & Witney | 27 (9, 9, 9) | Salsa | "Valió la Pena" — Marc Anthony | Marc Anthony | Safe |
| Alek & Lindsay | 25 (9, 8, 8) | Contemporary | "Holding Out for a Hero" — Ella Mae Bowen | Chris Kyle | Safe |
| Andy & Allison | 22 (8, 7, 7) | Viennese waltz | "Isn't She Lovely" — Stevie Wonder | Stevie Wonder & Kathryn Grammer | Eliminated |
| Alexa & Mark | 25 (9, 8, 8) | Argentine tango | "Viva la Vida" — Coldplay | David | Safe |
| Nick & Sharna | 30 (10, 10, 10) | Contemporary | "Can't Help Falling in Love" — Haley Reinhart | Lauren Kitt | Immunity |
| Bindi & Derek | 28 (10, 9, 9) | Foxtrot | "Grace Kelly" — MIKA | Grace Kelly | Safe |
| Tamar & Val | 28 (9, 9, 10) | Paso doble | "Born This Way" — Lady Gaga | Toni Braxton | Safe |

Dance-offs
| Couple | Dance | Music | Result |
|---|---|---|---|
| Carlos & Witney (Note: Carlos & Witney received votes from all three judges.) | Jive | "Travelin' Band" — Creedence Clearwater Revival | Winners |
| Bindi & Derek (Note: Bindi & Derek received the public vote (64%).) | Jive | "Travelin' Band" — Creedence Clearwater Revival | Losers |
| Alexa & Mark (Note: Alexa & Mark received one vote from Carrie Ann, plus the public vote (76%).) | Cha-cha-cha | "Fun" — Pitbull, feat. Chris Brown | Winners |
| Tamar & Val (Note: Tamar & Val received votes from Julianne and Bruno.) | Cha-cha-cha | "Fun" — Pitbull, feat. Chris Brown | Losers |
| Andy & Allison (Note: Andy & Allison received votes from all three judges, plus the public vote (54%).) | Samba | "Lean On" — Major Lazer & DJ Snake, feat. MØ | Winners |
| Alek & Lindsay | Samba | "Lean On" — Major Lazer & DJ Snake, feat. MØ | Losers |

=== Week 9: Showstoppers Night ===
Couples performed one unlearned dance and a musical theater-inspired team-up dance with another couple, which involved the celebrities dancing side-by-side to the same song and receiving the same set of scores from the judges for the routine. Couples are listed in the order they performed.

During dress rehearsals, Tamar Braxton fell ill and was taken to the emergency room. She was unable to return for her contemporary dance; the judges' scores were based on dress rehearsal footage. Braxton did return in time for her team-up dance with Nick & Sharna. However, she subsequently withdrew from the competition after her doctors discovered pulmonary embolisms in her lungs.

| Couple | Scores | Dance | Music | Result |
|---|---|---|---|---|
| Alek & Lindsay | 24 (8, 8, 8) | Salsa | "Back It Up" — Prince Royce, feat. Jennifer Lopez & Pitbull | Safe |
| Alexa & Mark | 30 (10, 10, 10) | Contemporary | "Make It Rain" — Ed Sheeran | Eliminated |
| Carlos & Witney | 27 (9, 9, 9) | Argentine tango | "What Do You Mean?" — Justin Bieber | Safe |
| Bindi & Derek | 30 (10, 10, 10) | Viennese waltz | "Roses and Violets" — Alexander Jean | Safe |
| Tamar & Val | 22 (8, 7, 7) | Contemporary | "Wicked Game" — James Vincent McMorrow | Safe (later withdrew) |
| Nick & Sharna | 28 (9, 9, 10) | Quickstep | "A Cool Cat in Town" — Tape Five | Safe |
| Alek & Lindsay Carlos & Witney | 24 (8, 8, 8) | Paso doble | "We Will Rock You" — Queen (from We Will Rock You) | |
| Alexa & Mark Bindi & Derek | 30 (10, 10, 10) | Charleston | "All That Jazz" & "Hot Honey Rag" — Kander and Ebb (from Chicago) | |
| Nick & Sharna Tamar & Val | 27 (9, 9, 9) | Rumba | "Hey Jude" — The Beatles (from Love) | |

=== Week 10: Semifinals ===
Couples performed one unlearned dance and a trio dance involving an eliminated pro or a pro from previous seasons. Midway through the show, the four couples participated in dance-offs, with the winners receiving three points to be added to their total scores. Couples are listed in the order they performed.

Due to the unexpected withdrawal of Tamar Braxton earlier in the week, all four couples advanced directly to the finals.

| Couple | Trio partner | Scores | Dance | Music |
|---|---|---|---|---|
| Bindi & Derek | Mark Ballas | 27 (9, 9, 9) | Salsa | "You're Never Fully Dressed Without a Smile" — Sia |
| Bindi & Derek | Mark Ballas | 30 (10, 10, 10) | Jazz | "Resolve" — Nathan Lanier |
| Alek & Lindsay | Emma Slater | 30 (10, 10, 10) | Waltz | "America the Beautiful" — Ray Chew |
| Alek & Lindsay | Emma Slater | 27 (9, 9, 9) | Argentine tango | "Ex's & Oh's" — Elle King |
| Carlos & Witney | Karina Smirnoff | 28 (9, 9, 10) | Contemporary | "Drag Me Down" — One Direction |
| Carlos & Witney | Karina Smirnoff | 29 (9, 10, 10) | Charleston | "Booty Swing" — Parov Stelar |
| Nick & Sharna | Peta Murgatroyd | 24 (8, 8, 8) | Tango | "Scars" — Alesso, feat. Ryan Tedder |
| Nick & Sharna | Peta Murgatroyd | 30 (10, 10, 10) | Salsa | "No Doubt About It" — Jussie Smollett & Pitbull |

Dance-offs
| Couple | Dance | Music | Result |
|---|---|---|---|
| Carlos & Witney | Cha-cha-cha | "Fun" — Pitbull, feat. Chris Brown | Winners |
| Alek & Lindsay | Cha-cha-cha | "Fun" — Pitbull, feat. Chris Brown | Losers |
| Bindi & Derek | Samba | "Lean On" — Major Lazer & DJ Snake, feat. MØ | Winners |
| Nick & Sharna | Samba | "Lean On" — Major Lazer & DJ Snake, feat. MØ | Losers |

=== Week 11: Finals ===
On the first night, couples danced a previously-learned style to a new song that was coached by one of the three judges, as well as a freestyle routine. On the second night, the final three couples performed a fusion dance that combined two dance styles. Couples are listed in the order they performed.

Night 1

| Couple | Scores | Dance | Music | Result |
|---|---|---|---|---|
| Carlos & Witney | 30 (10, 10, 10) | Foxtrot | "The Hills" — The Weeknd | Eliminated |
| Carlos & Witney | 30 (10, 10, 10) | Freestyle | "WTF (Where They From)" — Missy Elliott, feat. Pharrell Williams | Eliminated |
| Alek & Lindsay | 27 (9, 9, 9) | Rumba | "The Pieces Don't Fit Anymore" — James Morrison | Safe |
| Alek & Lindsay | 30 (10, 10, 10) | Freestyle | "Marchin On" — OneRepublic | Safe |
| Nick & Sharna | 30 (10, 10, 10) | Jive | "Runaway Baby" — Bruno Mars | Safe |
| Nick & Sharna | 30 (10, 10, 10) | Freestyle | "Larger Than Life" — Backstreet Boys | Safe |
| Bindi & Derek | 30 (10, 10, 10) | Quickstep | "Dr. Bones" — Cherry Poppin' Daddies | Safe |
| Bindi & Derek | 30 (10, 10, 10) | Freestyle | "Footprints in the Sand" — Leona Lewis | Safe |

Night 2

| Couple | Scores | Dance | Music | Result |
|---|---|---|---|---|
| Nick & Sharna | 30 (10, 10, 10) | Salsa & Tango | "Turn Up the Music" — Chris Brown | Runners-up |
| Alek & Lindsay | 27 (9, 9, 9) | Rumba & Tango | "A Sky Full of Stars" — Coldplay | Third place |
| Bindi & Derek | 30 (10, 10, 10) | Argentine tango & Cha-cha-cha | "All the Way" — Timeflies | Winners |

== Dance chart ==
The couples performed the following each week:

- Weeks 1–6: One unlearned dance
- Week 7: One unlearned dance & team dance
- Week 8: One unlearned dance & dance-offs
- Week 9: One unlearned dance & team-up dance
- Week 10 (Semifinals): One unlearned dance, dance-offs & trio dance
- Week 11 (Finals, Night 1): Judge's choice & freestyle
- Week 11 (Finals, Night 2): Fusion dance

Color key:

No scores received

Dancing with the Stars (season 21) - Dance chart
| Couple | Week | | | | | | | | | | | | | | | | | | |
| Couple | 1 | 2 | | 3 | 4 | 5 | 6 | 7 | | 8 | | 9 | | 10 | | | 11 | | |
| Couple | 1 | Night 1 | Night 2 | 3 | 4 | 5 | 6 | 7 | | 8 | | 9 | | 10 | | | Night 1 | | Night 2 |
|---|---|---|---|---|---|---|---|---|---|---|---|---|---|---|---|---|---|---|---|
| Bindi & Derek | Jive | Tango | Waltz | Quickstep | Contemp. | Cha-cha-cha | Rumba | Argentine tango | Team Freestyle | Foxtrot | Jive | Viennese waltz | Charleston | Salsa | Samba | Jazz | Quickstep | Freestyle | Argentine tango & Cha-cha-cha |
| Nick & Sharna | Cha-cha-cha | Jive | Foxtrot | Viennese waltz | Jazz | Paso doble | Samba | Argentine tango | Team Freestyle | Contemp. | Immunity | Quickstep | Rumba | Tango | Samba | Salsa | Jive | Freestyle | Salsa & Tango |
| Alek & Lindsay | Foxtrot | Jazz | Quickstep | Tango | Paso doble | Rumba | Jive | Viennese waltz | Team Freestyle | Contemp. | Samba | Salsa | Paso doble | Waltz | Cha-cha-cha | Argentine tango | Rumba | Freestyle | Rumba & Tango |
| Carlos & Witney | Jive | Foxtrot | Cha-cha-cha | Jazz | Waltz | Quickstep | Rumba | Paso doble | Team Freestyle | Salsa | Jive | Argentine tango | Paso doble | Contemp. | Cha-cha-cha | Charleston | Foxtrot | Freestyle | Rumba (Note: This couple danced, but received no scores.) |
| Tamar & Val | Quickstep | Cha-cha-cha | Charleston | Tango | Rumba | Samba | Jazz | Foxtrot | Team Freestyle | Paso doble | Cha-cha-cha | Contemp. | Rumba | | | | | | |
| Alexa & Mark | Jive | Salsa | Rumba | Jazz | Foxtrot | Tango | Cha-cha-cha | Paso doble | Team Freestyle | Argentine tango | Cha-cha-cha | Contemp. | Charleston | | | | | | Jazz |
| Andy & Allison | Foxtrot | Jive | Contemp. | Quickstep | Cha-cha-cha | Argentine tango | Jazz | Paso doble | Team Freestyle | Viennese waltz | Samba | | | | | | | | |
| Hayes & Emma | Cha-cha-cha | Foxtrot | Quickstep | Jive | Contemp. | Viennese waltz | Jazz | Waltz | Team Freestyle | | | | | | | | | | Contemp. |
| Paula & Louis | Quickstep | Rumba | Tango | Samba | Cha-cha-cha | Jive | Jazz | | | | | | | | | | | | Samba |
| Gary & Anna | Cha-cha-cha | Foxtrot | Paso doble | Tango | Jazz | | | | | | | | | | | | | | Cha-cha-cha |
| Kim & Tony | Salsa | Quickstep | Foxtrot | | | | | | | | | | | | | | | | Samba |
| Victor & Karina | Salsa | Jive | Rumba | | | | | | | | | | | | | | | | Jive |
| Chaka & Keo | Cha-cha-cha | Foxtrot | | | | | | | | | | | | | | | | | |
