= Nick Carter discography =

American singer discography

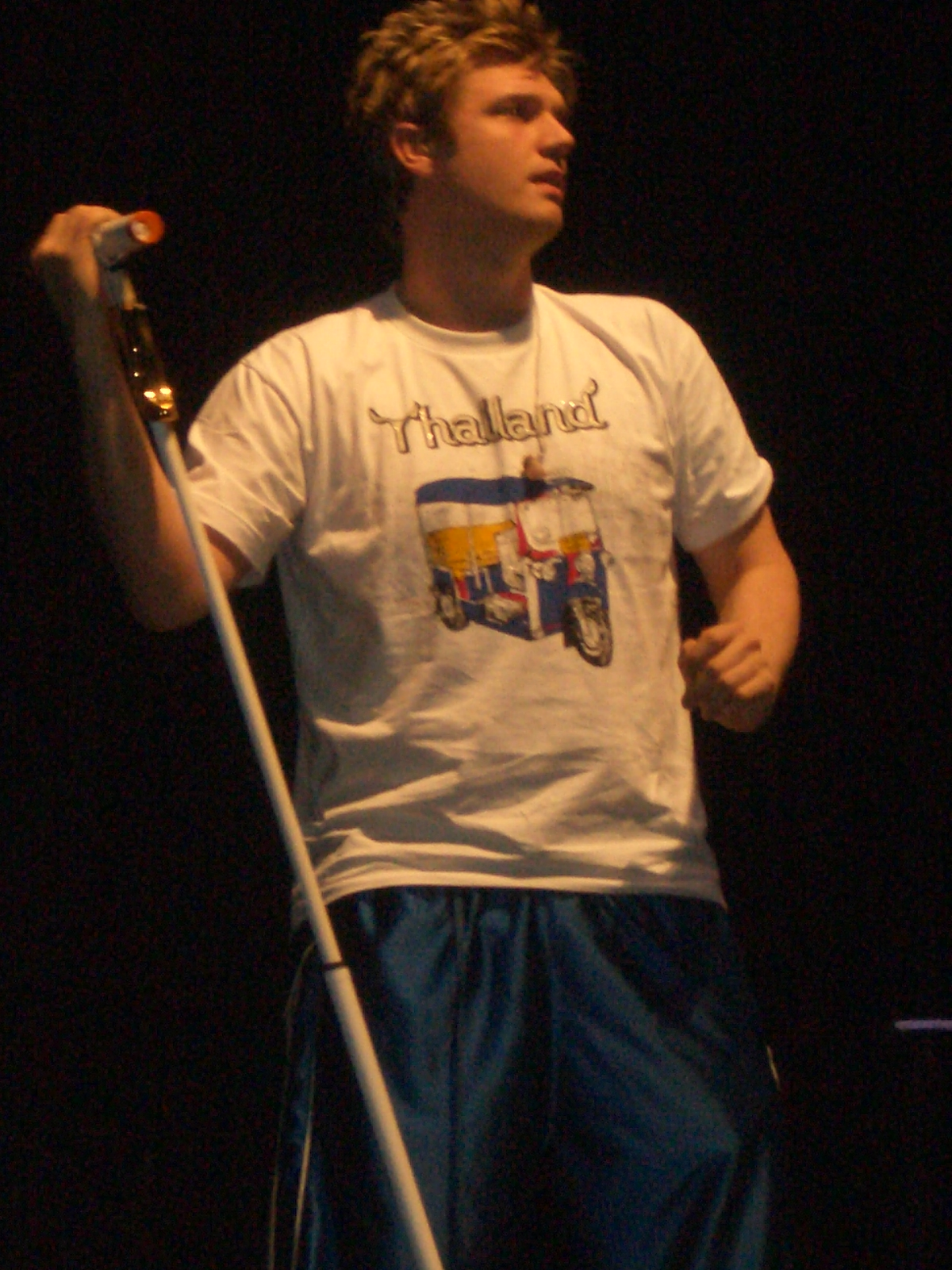
- Carter in a concert in January 2006
- Studio albums: 4
- Compilation albums: 1
- Singles: 8
- Music videos: 7

Nick Carter is an American singer and a member of the vocal group Backstreet Boys His solo discography consists of three studio albums, one compilation album, eight singles (including one as a featured artist) and four music videos.

Carter attempted a career as a solo artist in 2002 when he released Now or Never. The album reached number 17 on the Billboard 200 and was certified gold, both in the United States and Canada. The lead single, "Help Me," achieved considerable worldwide success, while the other single, "I Got You," was a minor hit in Europe.

Carter began work on his second solo album in 2003, but the recordings were aborted when the Backstreet Boys returned to the studio. One of the tracks from the earlier recording sessions was used as the theme song to the television series House of Carters in 2006. "Let It Go" was written by Nick Carter, Matthew Gerrard, and Bridget Louise Benenate.

Carter recorded a duet with pop singer Jennifer Paige called "Beautiful Lie" in 2009. In 2010, Nick Carter started recording new songs for his second solo album, working with Rami, Carl Falk, Toby Gad, Josh Hoge, Claude Kelly, and others. The album, titled I'm Taking Off, was released in Japan on February 2, 2011, in Germany on June 3, and in the US iTunes Store on May 24.

== Albums ==
=== Studio albums ===
Title	Album details	Chart positions									Certifications
Title	Album details	US	AUT	CAN	GER	JPN	NL	SWE	SWI	UK	Certifications
Now or Never	Released: October 29, 2002; Label: Jive; Formats: CD, digital download	17	66	—	25	4	41	41	85	91	RIAA: Gold; MC: Gold; RIAJ: Gold
I'm Taking Off	Released: February 2, 2011; Label: Sony Music, Kaotic, Inc; Formats: CD, digital download	—	—	12	46	8	—	—	—	—	
Nick & Knight (with Jordan Knight)	Released: September 2, 2014; Label: BMG; Formats: CD, digital download	24	—	14	—	—	—	—	—	—	
All American	Release: November 25, 2015; Label: Sony Music, Kaotic, Inc; Formats: CD, digital download	—	—	99	—	27	—	—	—	—	
Love Life Tragedy	Release: May 15, 2025; Label: Kaotic, Inc; Formats: digital download	—	—	—	—	—	—	—	—	—	

=== Compilations ===
Title	Album details
Before the Backstreet Boys 1989–1993	Released: October 1, 2002; Label: Dyenamic Discs

== Singles ==
=== As lead artist ===
List of singles with selected chart positions
Title	Year	Peak chart positions												Album
Title	Year	US Pop	AUS	AUT	BEL	CAN	GER	ITA	JPN	NL	SWE	SWI	UK	Album
"Help Me"	2002	36	30	26	38	9	18	9	— (Note: Charted at number 16 on the Oricon physical singles chart.)	24	20	33	17	Now or Never
"Do I Have to Cry for You"	2002	—	—	—	—	—	—	—	—	—	—	—	—	Now or Never
"I Got You"	2003	—	—	74	41	—	57	34	— (Note: Charted at number 63 on Oricon physical singles chart.)	71	58	91	—	Now or Never
"Just One Kiss"	2011	—	—	55	—	—	75	—	12	—	—	—	—	I'm Taking Off
"Love Can't Wait"	2011	—	—	—	—	2	—	—	—	—	—	—	—	I'm Taking Off
"Burning Up" (featuring Britton "Briddy" Shaw)	2011	—	—	—	—	—	—	—	—	—	—	—	—	I'm Taking Off
"Just the Two of Us" (with Jordan Knight)	2014	—	—	—	—	—	—	—	—	—	—	—	—	Nick & Knight
"One More Time" (with Jordan Knight)	2014	—	—	—	—	63	—	—	—	—	—	—	—	Nick & Knight
"I Will Wait"	2015	—	—	—	—	—	—	—	—	—	—	—	—	All American
"Nothing's Gonna Change My Love for You" (with Nissy)	2016	—	—	—	—	—	—	—	86	—	—	—	—	All American
"19 in 99"	2016	—	—	—	—	—	—	—	—	—	—	—	—	All American
"80s Movie"	2020	—	—	—	—	—	—	—	—	—	—	—	—	Non-album Single
"Scary Monster"	2021	—	—	—	—	—	—	—	—	—	—	—	—	Non-album Single
"Easy" (featuring Jimmie Allen)	2022	—	—	—	—	—	—	—	—	—	—	—	—	Non-album Single
"Hurts to Love You"	2023	—	—	—	—	—	—	—	—	—	—	—	—	Love Life Tragedy
"Superman"	2023	—	—	—	—	—	—	—	—	—	—	—	—	Love Life Tragedy
"Made for Us"	2023	—	—	—	—	—	—	—	—	—	—	—	—	Love Life Tragedy
"Never Break My Heart (Not Again)"	2023	—	—	—	—	—	—	—	—	—	—	—	—	Love Life Tragedy
"So Sweet (The Amazing Digital Circus)"	2024	—	—	—	—	—	—	—	—	—	—	—	—	Non-album Single
"Stages"	2025	—	—	—	—	—	—	—	—	—	—	—	—	Non-album Single
"Hey Kid"	2025	—	—	—	—	—	—	—	—	—	—	—	—	Love Life Tragedy
"Searchlight (Radio Edit)"	2025	—	—	—	—	—	—	—	—	—	—	—	—	Love Life Tragedy
"Love Life Tragedy"	2026	—	—	—	—	—	—	—	—	—	—	—	—	Non-album Single
"Magic"	2026	—	—	—	—	—	—	—	—	—	—	—	—	Non-album Single

=== As featured artist ===
List of singles with selected chart positions
Title	Year	Peak chart positions				Album
Title	Year	US AC	AUS	AUT	GER	Album
"Oh Aaron" (Aaron Carter featuring Nick Carter and No Secrets)	2001	—	—	—	—	Oh Aaron
"Not Too Young, Not Too Old" (Aaron Carter featuring Nick Carter)	2001	—	80	—	—	Oh Aaron
"She Wants Me" (Aaron Carter featuring Nick Carter)	2003	—	—	—	—	Most Requested Hits
"Come Together Now" (among various artists)	2005	39	—	—	—	Hurricane Relief: Come Together Now
"Beautiful Lie" (Jennifer Paige featuring Nick Carter)	2009	—	—	49	19	Best Kept Secret

== Other appearances ==
The following songs are bonus B-sides and have not appeared on an album by Nick Carter.

- "European Girls"
- "Don't Walk Away"
- "End of Forever"
- "Love to Love" (Backstreet Boys)
- "Not Like You"
- "Payback"
- "Rockstar Baby"
- "What More Can I Give" (with the All Stars)
- "There for Me" (with Melissa Schuman)
- "Let It Go" (from House of Carters)
- "Funny Face"
- "No More Games" (from Kill Speed)
- "Scream"
- "Prisoner"
- "I Gotta Get with You"
- "Forever Rebel"

== Music videos ==
Title	Year	Director(s)
"Help Me"	2002	Chris Applebaum
"Do I Have to Cry for You"	2002	Matthew Rolston
"I Got You"	2003	Tryan George
"Beautiful Lie" (Jennifer Paige featuring Nick Carter)	2009	
"Just One Kiss"	2010	Danny Roew
"I'm Taking Off"	2011	Nick Carter
"Love Can't Wait"	2011	Rome
"Burning Up"	2012	Danny Roew
"One More Time" (with Jordan Knight)	2014	Jakob Owens
"I Will Wait"	2015	Kevin Estrada
"19 in 99"	2016	Kevin Estrada
"19 in 99" (Japan version)	2016	
"Easy"	2022	Danny Roew
"Superman"	2023	Danny Roew
"Hurts to Love You"	2023	
"Made for Us"	2023	
"Never Break My Heart (Not Again)"	2024	Pedro Calvo
