= Flowers (Jennifer Paige album) =

Flowers (The Hits Collection)

Greatest hits album by Jennifer Paige
- Released: May 29, 2003
- Genre: Pop
- Label: Edel

Jennifer Paige chronology
Positively Somewhere (2001)	Flowers (The Hits Collection) (2003)	Best Kept Secret (2008)

Flowers (The Hits Collection) is a greatest hits album of American pop singer Jennifer Paige released by her former record label Edel.

== Track listing ==
1. "Crush" – 3:19
2. Here With Me – 3:39
3. "These Days" – 3:26
4. "Stranded" – 3:34
5. "Always You" (The Ballad Mix) – 4:12
6. "Sober" – 4:05
7. Not This Time – 3:24
8. Get To Me – 3:59
9. Busted – 3:47
10. Questions – 4:14
11. Feel So Farway – 4:13
12. Tell Me When – 4:43
13. You Get Through – 3:57
14. The Edge – 3:20
15. While You Were Gone – 4:12
16. Saturday Girl (demo version) – 3:34
17. "Always You (Bonus Remix)" – 4:04
18. "Crush (Morales radio alt intro)" – 3:36

DVD (The Videos)

1. Crush 3:36
2. Always You 3:38
3. Sober 4:05
4. Stranded 3:35
5. Making Of... Stranded 6:01
6. Making Of... Sober 3:32
7. Crush International Interview 7:57
8. Crush Asian Tour Footage 4:04
