= Russ DeSalvo =

American songwriter

Russ DeSalvo is an American producer, arranger, songwriter, and guitarist.

DeSalvo works with Celine Dion, Lionel Richie (DeSalvo played guitar and synthesizer on the Definitive Collection CD), Laura Pausini, and Kyle Archer (guitar on the Addin' Somethin' In CD). In April 2006, DeSalvo and British singer/songwriter Natascha Sohl released a single entitled "Naked," material that they wrote and recorded.

DeSalvo was the composer of, and the writer of "Real Life" and "Feels Like Love" on, Barbie Diaries (2006), an animated movie.

== Publishing ==
Desalvo was formerly published by Sir Paul McCartney's music publishing company (MPL Communications), INC, EMI Music Publishing, and Warner/Chappell Music.

== Current arranging and writing ==
Desalvo is currently writing and arranging for Disney's Princess Stores; scoring, producing, writing, and arranging for Mattel's Barbie Diaries & Barbie 6 Series; and writing collaborations with Amber Claire (Sony/BMG – New Zealand), Ross Copperman (Sony/BMG – UK), James Carrington (Cheeky Music/Champion Records – UK), Greg Johnson (Capitol Records – New Zealand), and Kristy Frank (Ruff Nation/Universal).

== Management ==
DeSalvo is represented by Aimee Berger, President of 2 Generations SPA Music Management (2G), a music management and record label company.

== Discography ==
- "Freak of Nature," Anastacia, 2001–03, Guitar (Acoustic), Arranger, Keyboards
- "Not That Kind," Anastacia, 2001, Guitar (Acoustic), Arranger, Keyboards
- "How We Roll," The Barrio Boyzz, 1995, Guitar
- "Donde Quiera Que Estes," 1993, 2005, The Barrio Boyzz, Soloist, Guitarra Concheros
- "Ven a Mi," The Barrio Boyzz, 1997, Guitar
- "Guitar Crazy Coolin'," The Barrio Boyzz, 1992, Guitar
- "Love And Freedom," BeBe Winans, 2000, Guitar, Arranger, Keyboards, Producer
- "I'm No Angel," Carole Davis, 1993, Guitar
- "These Are Special Times," Celine Dion, 1998 & 2000, Guitar, Arranger
- "Unison/Celine Dion/The Colour of My Love," Celine Dion, 2002, Keyboards
- "One Heart," Celine Dion, 2003, Guitar, Piano, Arranger, Keyboards
- "The Colour of My Love," Celine Dion, 1993, Keyboards
- "Falling Into You," Celine Dion, 1996, Guitar
- "I Drove All Night/I Know What Love Is," Celine Dion, 2003, Guitar, Piano, Arranger, Keyboards
- "Just No Other Way," CoCo Lee, 2000, Arranger
- "Innocent Eyes," Delta Goodrem, 2003, Synthesizer, Guitar, Arranger
- "Positively Somewhere," Jennifer Paige, 2001–03, Guitar (Acoustic), Guitar (Electric), Keyboards, Programming, Producer
- "Everything's Kool & The Gang: Greatest Hits & More," Kool & the Gang, 1988, Guitar
- "Stronger," Kristine W, 2000, Guitar
- "From the Inside," Laura Pausini, 2002 & 2004, Guitar
- "The Definitive Collection, Lionel Richie, 2003, Synthesizer, Guitar, Arranger
- "Encore", Lionel Richie, 2002, Synthesizer, Guitar, Arranger
- "All Sides," LMNT, 2002, Guitar (Acoustic), Guitar, Guitar (Electric)
- "The Raven, Lou Reed, 2003, Guitar, Arranger, Keyboards
- "Shut Up and Kiss Me," Michelle Wright, 2004, Guitar (Acoustic), Arranger, Guitar (Electric), Keyboards, Producer, Keyboard Programming
- "Return to Love," Nana Mouskouri, 1997, Guitar (Acoustic), Arranger, Keyboards
- "A Rosie Christmas," Rosie O'Donnell, 1999, Guitar, Arranger, Keyboards, Keyboard Programming
- "Another Rosie Christmas," Rosie O'Donnell, 2000, Guitar (Acoustic), Guitar, Arranger, Keyboards
- "Purest of Pain," Son by Four, 2000, Synthesizer, Guitar (Acoustic), Arranger, Keyboards
- "Songs from the Crystal Cave," Steven Seagal, 2004, Synthesizer, Guitar (Acoustic), Arranger, Guitar (Electric)
- "Love Child," Sweet Sensation, 1990, Guitar, Guitar (Electric)
- "Tony Terry," Tony Terry, 1991, Guitar
- "Ally McBeal: For Once in My Life," featuring Vonda Shepard, various artists, 2001, Guitar, Keyboards, Programming
- ”Feed Your Soul,” Gillian Krystal, 2019, Producer
- "Choose Your Own Adventure: The Abominable Snowman," Cassidy Ladden, 2006, Songwriter
