= Love Can't Wait =

Love Can't Wait may refer to:

- Love Can't Wait (album), a 1991 album by Lil Suzy
- Love Can't Wait (TV series), a 2006 television South Korean television series
- "Love Can't Wait" (Nick Carter song), 2010
- "Love Can't Wait", a song by Moka Only from the album Flood, 2002
- Love Can't Wait (book) by Muskie Fields [URL https://streamofwisdompress.org], 2017
