= Candycoatedwaterdrops =

candycoatedwaterdrops

Studio album by Plumb
- Released: April 13, 1999
- Studios: Tejas Recorders, The Castle and Sound Kitchen (Franklin, Tennessee); East Iris Studios and Sound Stage Studios (Nashville, Tennessee); Front Page Recorders (Glendale, California)
- Genre: Rock
- Length: 43:55
- Label: Essential
- Producers: Matt Bronleewe; Glenn Rosenstein

Plumb chronology
| Plumb (1997) | candycoatedwaterdrops (1999) | The Best of Plumb (2000) |

Singles from candycoatedwaterdrops
- 1. "Late Great Planet Earth" Released: 1999; 2. "God-Shaped Hole" Released: 1999; 3. "Here with Me" Released: 1999; 4. "Damaged" Released: 1999; 5. "Phobic" Released: 1999; 6. "Solace" Released: 1999

Professional ratings
Review scores
| Source | Rating |
|---|---|
| Allmusic | 4/5 stars |
| Artistdirect | 4/5 stars |
| Jesus Freak Hideout | 4/5 stars |
| Cross Rhythms | 10/10 stars |
| HM Magazine | (not rated) |
| The Phantom Tollbooth | 2/5 stars 3.5/5 stars |

candycoatedwaterdrops is the second album of Christian singer Plumb. It has been critically acclaimed, and singles have appeared on major motion picture soundtracks such as Bruce Almighty and Drive Me Crazy. The songs "Stranded" and "Here with Me" were covered by Jennifer Paige on her second album Positively Somewhere, with the former track becoming a single and an airplay hit in mainland Europe.

== Track listing ==
Album release
| No. | Title | Writer(s) | Length |
|---|---|---|---|
| 1. | "Late Great Planet Earth" | Tiffany Arbuckle, Matt Bronleewe, Jimmy Collins | 3:56 |
| 2. | "Stranded" | T. Arbuckle, Bronleewe, Ian Matthews | 3:39 |
| 3. | "Here with Me" | T. Arbuckle, Thad Beaty, Bronleewe, Matt Stanfield | 4:04 |
| 4. | "Lie Low" | T. Arbuckle, Bronleewe | 3:12 |
| 5. | "Phobic" | T. Arbuckle, Bronleewe, Stanfield | 4:29 |
| 6. | "God-Shaped Hole" | T. Arbuckle, Wayne Kirkpatrick | 3:50 |
| 7. | "Solace" | Brandon Arbuckle, T. Arbuckle | 2:56 |
| 8. | "Worlds Collide: A Fairy Tale" | T. Arbuckle, Bronleewe, Collins | 3:50 |
| 9. | "Damaged" | T. Arbuckle, Beaty, Bronleewe | 3:56 |
| 10. | "Drugstore Jesus" | T. Arbuckle, Bronleewe, Collins | 4:33 |
| 11. | "CandyCoatedWaterDrops" | Bronleewe | 5:25 |
| Total length: | | | 43:50 |

== Covers ==
"Damaged" was covered by the trance group Plummet in 2001. There are two versions of the music video; one which includes a girl with balloons and another with mannequins.

"Here with Me" and "Stranded" were covered by Jennifer Paige on her second album Positively Somewhere in 2001.

== Personnel ==
Plumb

- Tiffany Arbuckle – lead vocals (1–11.1), backing vocals (1–8, 10)
- Matt Stanfield – acoustic piano (4–6, 8–11.1), synthesizers (5–7, 9), Moog bass (5), Mellotron (7), programming (7)
- Joe Porter – drums, percussion (4, 6)
- Stephen Leiweke – guitars (does not play on album)
- J. J Plasencio – bass (does not play on album)

Additional musicians

- Tony Miracle – programming (1, 3, 4)
- Mike Purcell – programming (2, 7)
- Glenn Rosenstein – Mellotron (2), programming (2, 6), guitars (2, 6), Vox Continental organ (6), backing vocals (6)
- Thad Beaty – guitars (1–3, 5–8)
- Gary Burnette – guitars (1, 10)
- Jerry McPherson – guitars (3, 4, 8)
- George Cocchini – guitars (5, 6)
- Fats Kaplin – lap steel guitar (11.1)
- Jackie Street – bass (1, 4, 8–10)
- B.J. Aberle – bass (2, 3, 6, 7, 11.1), loops (5, 9)
- Michael Quinlan – loops (3)
- Jimmy Jernigan – additional percussion (4)
- Ric Robbins – scratches (1, 3, 5, 8, 9)
- Madison Williams – vocals (11.2)

The London Symphony Recording Orchestra (Tracks 1, 3, 4, 8 & 10)

- Tom Howard – arrangements and conductor

Horns and Woodwinds

- Christopher O'Neal – cor anglais, oboe
- Philippa Davies – first flute
- Kathleen Stevenson – second flute
- Richard Bissill, Philip Eastop and John Pigneguy – horns

Strings

- Frank Schaefer – first cello
- Paul Kegg, Tony Lewis and Jonathan Williams – cello
- Chris Laurence – first double bass
- Paul Cullington – double bass
- Katie Wilkinson – first viola
- Philip Dukes, Peter Lale and Paul Martin – viola
- Gavyn Wright – first violin
- John Bradbury, Dermot Crehan, Jonathan Evans-Jones, Rebecca Hirsch, Patrick Kiernan, Boguslaw Kostecki, Jim McLeod, Perry Montague-Mason, David Nolan, Peter Oxer and Cathy Thompson – violin

Percussion

- Steve Henderson and Bill Lockhart

== Production ==
- Bob Wohler – executive producer
- Matt Bronleewe – producer (1, 3–6, 8–11)
- Glenn Rosenstein – producer (2, 7), recording (2, 7)
- Aaron Swihart – recording (1, 3–6, 8–11)
- B.J. Aberle – Pro Tools engineer and editing (1, 3–6, 8–11)
- Chris Fogel – mixing (1, 4, 9, 10)
- Steve Bishir – recording (2, 7), mixing (2)
- Mike Purcell – recording (2, 7)
- F. Reid Shippen – mixing (3, 5–8, 11)
- Brad Burke – assistant engineer (1, 3–6, 8–11)
- Jimmy Jernigan – additional engineer (1, 3–6, 8–11)
- Patrick Kelly – additional engineer (1, 3–6, 8–11)
- Mon Agranat – mix assistant (1, 4, 9, 10)
- Dan Shike – mix assistant (3, 5–8, 11)
- John Trevethan – technical assistant (2, 7)
- Ken Love – mastering at MasterMix (Nashville, Tennessee)
- Traci Sterling Bishir – production coordination (2, 7)
- Michelle Pearson – project coordinator
- Michelle Kapp – design
- Axis Media – design
- Tamara Reynolds – photography
- Toni Armani – make-up, hair stylist
- Lori Turk – make-up, hair stylist
- Jennifer Kemp – wardrobe
- Elizabeth Petree – wardrobe
- Rendy Lovelady Management – management
