= Positively Somewhere =

Studio album by Jennifer Paige
- Released: September 18, 2001
- Genre: Pop
- Length: 46:41
- Label: Edel; Hollywood
- Producer: Matt Bronleewe; Russ DeSalvo; Andy Goldmark; Mick Guzauski; Mark Hammond; Damian LeGassick; Oliver Leiber; Julian Raymond; Guy Roche; Chance Scoggins

Jennifer Paige chronology
Jennifer Paige (1998)	Positively Somewhere (2001)	Flowers (The Hits Collection) (2003)

Singles from Jennifer Paige
- 1. "These Days" Released: March 6, 2002; 2. "Stranded" Released: June 17, 2002

Positively Somewhere is the second studio album by American singer Jennifer Paige. It was released by Edel America and Hollywood Records on September 18, 2001 in the United States. Paige worked with wider variety on the album, including Matt Bronleewe, Russ DeSalvo, Mick Guzauski, and Julian Raymond. Exerting more creative control over the album, she co-wrote half of the material that ultimately made it onto the final tracklist.

The album earned largely mixed to polarizing reviews from music critics who found that it was diverse but lacked any standout moments. Issued a week after the September 11 attacks, Positively Somewhere failed to capture much attention amid the coverage surrounding the attacks and failed to chart in most music markets – except in Germany where it debuted and peaked at number 91 on the German Albums Chart. The album produced two singles, including the Bardot cover "These Days" and the Plumb cover "Stranded", both of which reached the top 40 of the Italian Singles Chart.

== Background ==
In 1998, Jennifer Paige released her debut single "Crush" through a joint venture between Edel America and Hollywood Records. An instant smash, the "breezy, guitar-laced mid-tempo jam" became a number one hit in Australia and New Zealand, while reaching the top 10 on most chart it appeared on, and catapulted Paige to international fame. In August 1998, her self debut album was released. Less successful, it peaked at number 139 on the US Billboard 200 but reached Gold status in Canada and went on to sell 900,000 units worldwide. Paige did a little songwriting on the album, co-penning pop/rock numbers like "Questions" and "Get to Me," but none of her songs were picked as singles.

After the success of "Crush," Paige wanted to come back "with something that was really fresh." Willing to gain more creative control over the project, she consulted previous and new collaborators to work with her on new songs. Paige commented on the process in MusicWorld in 2001: "I needed to take risks and do something with a little more bite. I've changed a lot over the past couple of years. I wanted this album to reflect that growth and to show people where I am right now." The album's title was inspired by a line of her cover of Bardot's song "These Days" ("These days, I don't think twice, I walk on light, I'm positively somewhere"). The tracks "Here With Me" and "Stranded" both are covers of songs by Plumb, from the album candycoatedwaterdrops (1999), while "Way of the World" is a cover of the song by Don Philip from his 2000 self-tittled 2000 debut album. "Make Me" was originally recorded in 1999-2000 by Solid HarmoniE for their cancelled album Two, which was eventually remastered and released in 2022.

== Critical reception ==
Professional ratings
Review scores
Source	Rating
AllMusic	2.5/5 stars
Blender	2/5 stars
laut.de	3/5 stars
MTV Asia	7/10

Positively Somewhere earned largely mixed to polarizing reviews from music critics. Dexter Yong from MTV Asia described Positively Somewhere a "positively attuned pop album" that serves "perfect pop ditties braised in juicy hooks and rhythms – the kind that Cher and Madonna dish out on their good days." He found that the album's "sterling songwriting and glossy production result in a neat bundle of R&B; and guitar-pop that is definitely heading somewhere." The Philippine Star felt that "Paige has definitely outgrown her "Crush", as she introduces to the public the depth of her musical talent with her new sound. The 12 tracks of the album explore her emotional side and tell us more about her life in the limelight." The newspaper further note: "She experimented with different beats so buyers get more than what they pay for with a great variety of songs."

AllMusic editor Stephen Thomas Erlewine gave the album two and a half out of five stars. He wrote: "With Positively Somewhere [Paige] recorded an album that could only be seen as a teen pop album, lacking many of the mature overtones of her debut. She still sounds great – rich, mature, and controlled beyond her years – but the songs aren't as fully realized as the debut and the production is a little flimsy. It's hardly a disaster, since Paige makes the songs listenable and the music itself is appealingly generic, but there's no hook and no single that makes it stand apart from the pack – which is unfortunate, since Jennifer Paige herself so clearly does. Less impressed, John Aizlewood, writing for Blender magazine, wrote: "Indistinguishable from Meredith Brooks, any solo Spice Girl and the whole galaxy of sub–Sheryl Crows, she is physically attractive, musically anodyne and personality-free. Dependent on the writing skills of others, Paige is a spectator on her own album. Positively Somewhere's 12 songs shuffle by in a monochrome haze." laut.de called Positively Somewhere a "musically diverse album without any standout moments."

== Commercial performance ==
The album debuted and peaked at number 91 on the German Albums Chart but fell off the chart in its second week. Positively Somewhere failed to chart elsewhere, following the "extreme misfortune" of debuting the week after the September 11 attacks, which according to Billboard ruined "any chance of it capturing much attention." Paige later commented on the album's underperformance: "That was really heart-breaking in a way, because I had put so much of my heart in the second album. By then I kind of had learned the ropes a bit more, and I worked really hard to get to that place, and it was just unfortunate timing."

== Track listing ==
Positively Somewhere track listing
No.	Title	Writer(s)	Producer(s)	Length
1.	"These Days"	Phil Thornalley; Colin Campsie	Oliver Leiber; David Gamson^{[A]}	3:27
2.	"Here with Me"	Matt Bronleewe; Tiffany Arbuckle Lee; Thad Beaty; Matt Stanfield	Bronleewe	3:39
3.	"Stranded"	Matt Bronleewe; Tiffany Arbuckle Lee	Bronleewe	3:35
4.	"Make Me"	Andy Goldmark; Mark Mueller	Goldmark	4:00
5.	"Way of the World"	Mark Hammond; Robin Scoffield	Hammond	3:16
6.	"Not This Time"	Jennifer Paige; Lars Halvor Jensen; Martin Michael Larsson; Kim Bullard	Bullard	3:25
7.	"You Get Through"	Paige; Russ DeSalvo; Arnold Michel Roman	Mick Guzauski; Russ DeSalvo	3:58
8.	"Feel So Far Away"	Chance Scoggins	Scoggins	4:14
9.	"The Edge"	Paige; Paige; Trina Harmon; Kasia Livingston	Damian LeGassick	3:21
10.	"Tell Me When"	Paige; Christopher Ward; Steve Booker	Bronleewe	4:43
11.	"Stay the Night"	Paige; Goldmark; Andreas Carlsson	Goldmark	3:03
12.	"Vapor"	Brijitte West; Peter Lloyd	Julian Raymond	6:29
Total length:				46:41

Bonus tracks
No.	Title	Writer(s)	Producer(s)	Length
1.	"While You Were Gone"	Guy Roche; Shelly Peiken	Roche	4:12
2.	"Saturday Girl"	Paige; DeSalvo; Roman	DeSalvo; Roman	3:35
3.	"Things Are Looking Up"	Paige; Booker	Bronleewe	3:28

Notes

- ^{^[A]} denotes co-producer(s)

== Charts ==
Weekly chart performance for Positively Somewhere
Chart (2002)	Peak position
German Albums (Offizielle Top 100)	91
