= Underestimated (song) =

Single by Jennifer Paige

from the album Best Kept Secret
- B-side: "Underestimated (Original Version)"
- Released: May 5, 2008
- Genre: Pop rock
- Length: 3:13
- Label: Glor (SPV)
- Songwriters: Jennifer Paige; Peter Ries
- Producer: Peter Ries

Jennifer Paige singles chronology
"Wasted" (2008)	"Underestimated" (2008)	"Ta Voix (The Calling)" (2008)

Music video
- "Underestimated" on Youtube.com

"Underestimated" is a 2008 song recorded by American singer Jennifer Paige. The song was written by Paige and Ries and produced by Peter Ries. The song was released on May 5, 2008, as the second single from her third album, Best Kept Secret. "Underestimated" reached #26 in Nederlands. The remix of Peter Ries isn't included in the album.

== Track listing ==
1. Underestimated (Peter Ries Radio Remix) — 3:13
2. Underestimated (Original Version) — 3:48

== Charts ==
The song reached number 26 in Nederlands.
