= Do I Have to Cry for You =

Single by Nick Carter

from the album Now or Never
- Released: 2002
- Genre: Pop
- Length: 3:37
- Label: Jive
- Songwriters: B. Kierulf, J. Schwartz, Nick Carter

Nick Carter singles chronology
"Help Me" (2002)	"Do I Have to Cry for You" (2002)	"I Got You" (2003)

"Do I Have to Cry for You" is a song by American singer Nick Carter, released as the second single from his debut solo album Now or Never (2002). The track is a rock-edged ballad that addresses emotional vulnerability in the context of a deteriorating relationship and has been noted by critics for its Bryan Adams–influenced sound, distinguishing it from Carter's work with the Backstreet Boys.

The accompanying music video was directed by Matthew Rolston, and the song reached number 20 on the Spanish singles chart.

== Song details and promotion ==
According to the singer, the song presents the perspective of a man facing the deterioration of a relationship, addressing the expression of emotions and emotional vulnerability. Also, the lyrics depict situations in which relationships go wrong and the protagonist reaches an emotional limit, where crying becomes a possible response to what has been experienced.

The music video for the single was filmed in Los Angeles in early November 2002 and was directed by Matthew Rolston, a fashion photographer and director. The song was included in the promotional tour for Now or Never, during a Mexico show it was performed as part of a medley with Bryan Adams' "(Everything I Do) I Do It for You".

== Critical reception ==
In his review for the single, Larry Flick of Billboard described the song as "an instantly likeable, rock-edged ballad that plays to Carter's vocal strengths", noting that Carter is "doing an admirable job of carving out a new niche for himself as a pop lothario with more natural poise and charisma than he ever displayed as a member of Backstreet Boys". Flick added that Carter "often sounds like Bryan Adams at his peak here", highlighting the arrangement that "builds from sweetly spare piano lines into tasty, theatrical guitar power-chords".

In other reviews, including those of Now or Never, critics mentioned "Do I Have to Cry for You" generally describing it as a pop-rock ballad with evident influence from Bryan Adams, or noting its soft rock approach as distinct from Carter's work with the Backstreet Boys. Reviewing the album for the Regina Leader-Post, Sheri Block wrote that "Do I Have to Cry for You" is among the tracks where the artist is simply able to sing, without attempting to appear "cool" or mature, and that this sense of honesty could allow him to endure beyond the pop craze if he embraces it.

== Charts ==
Weekly chart performance for "Do I Have to Cry for You".
Chart (2002-2003)	Peak position
Poland Airplay (Polish Airplay Charts)	15
Spain (Promusicae)	20
Spain Airplay (Top 40 Radio)	35
