= Dead 7 =

2016 film directed by Danny Roew

- Screenplay by: Sawyer Perry
- Story by: Nick Carter
- Directed by: Danny Roew
- Starring: Nick Carter; Jeff Timmons; Carrie Keagan; Debra Wilson; AJ McLean; Howie Dorough; Joey Fatone; Erik-Michael Estrada; Lauren Kitt-Carter
- Music by: Bryan Shackle
- Country of origin: United States
- Original language: English

Production
- Producers: David Michael Latt; Paul Bales; Dylan Vox
- Cinematography: Eric Gustavo Petersen
- Editor: Jeremy M. Inman
- Running time: 90 minutes
- Production companies: The Asylum; KaOtic Productions

Original release
- Network: Syfy
- Release: April 1, 2016

Dead 7 (formerly titled Dead West) is a 2016 post-apocalyptic zombie horror western film written by Nick Carter, directed by Danny Roew and produced by The Asylum. It aired on SyFy on April 1, 2016, in the United States.

Carter managed to get two of his bandmates, AJ McLean and Howie Dorough, to star in the film. In addition, Carter also cast several members from other boy bands like 98 Degrees, O-Town, *NSYNC and All-4-One. The theme song "In the End" was released on March 28, performed by Carter, McLean, Dorough, Fatone, Kirkpatrick, Timmons and Estrada.

== Plot ==
After a zombie apocalypse, humanity reverts to a way of life reminiscent of the Old West. However, a woman named Apocalypta trains zombies to use as her army, which she calls Copperheads, to take over what is left of the world. She has her subordinates, Johnny Vermillion and Stamper, begin leading them to the town of Harper's Junction. Some of the residents run or hide while others, such as Billy, begin to fight back. When a Copperhead almost kills Billy, his girlfriend, Daisy Jane, saves him. Daisy and Billy encounter Johnny and capture him but with the sheriff dead and the town overrun, they take him with them as they head to Desert Springs. In Desert Springs, Mayor Shelby, who lost an eye to Apocalypta, and Sheriff Cooper question Johnny about why Apocalypta attacked Harper's Junction. When Johnny mocks them, Shelby tells Cooper to hang Johnny at sunrise. Meanwhile, Stamper tells Apocalypta about Johnny being captured, and she orders him to rescue Johnny. He does, and they plan their escape, but before he leaves, Johnny pays a visit to Georgie, a young boy that Cooper is raising.

Hearing about Johnny's escape, Shelby orders Cooper to assemble a group to kill Johnny, Apocalypta, and all of the Copperheads they see. At a nearby saloon, a man named "Whiskey Joe" is playing cards and when the men accuse him of cheating and try to kill him, he knocks them all out and leaves, where Cooper approaches him to join his team. Whiskey Joe goes to recruit his friend "The Vaquero", who recommends they bring a ninja named "Komodo" with them. Meanwhile, Daisy goes to the post office to hire a ranger to find Billy's brother Jack, hoping to get his help with Apocalypta but Billy is not happy about it. Whiskey Joe, Vaquero and Komodo meet up with Daisy, Billy, and Cooper, who explains the plan but the only person that can guide them through the valley near Apocalypta's base is Jack and there has been no word from him. Cooper goes to check on Georgie and Komodo mentions a warrior priestess named Sirene that might help them, but says they will not be able to find her, she will find them. Cooper reaches his house and finds the door open and when he hears a sound, he turns to find Georgie has been turned into a Copperhead. Billy and Daisy are arguing about Jack when they see a transformed Cooper approaching, leading an army of townspeople that have been transformed into Copperheads. Billy and Daisy warn the others as the bar they are at comes under attack and the group defends themselves. During the fight, Jack saves Daisy from being bitten by a Copperhead. After the fight, the mayor says he will give the group anything if they finish the mission and they all head off.

They arrive at the mines at the base of the mountain and Billy wants to go around them but Jack says they need to search the place as a friend had a stash of ammunition hidden there. The group splits up to search the mine but comes under attack by Copperheads pouring out of the mine. Jack is almost killed by a Copperhead but is saved by Sirene, who joins up with Jack, Billy and Daisy as they leave, with Jack saying they will tell the others where to meet up but they are unaware that they are being watched by Stamper. At the mountain base, Johnny tells Apocalypta that Stamper mapped out a way through the mines and they can attack Desert Springs while the heroes make their way up the mountain. Joe, Vaquero and Komodo try contacting the others but are unable to reach anyone and argue about what to do at first but after some Copperheads attack them, Joe decides to continue heading up the mountain. Jack and the others come across a truck containing dead bodies and when Stamper shows up to attack them, he is killed by Sirene. Sirene leads them up the mountain and when they stop for the night, she tells them about where the Copperhead name came from, and how her grandmother taught her how to track and hunt.

Komodo, Joe and Vaquero reach a brothel that Trixie, a woman Komodo likes, was heading for and decide to rest there. Jack and the others reach a corral that Apocalypta has her army of Copperheads held in and Sirene leads them up the mountain past it, saying to be careful of traps and Copperheads. Billy and Daisy argue over Billy not trusting Sirene, but they are unaware that Johnny is watching them and he captures Billy when he falls behind the others. Back at the brothel, Joe convinces the owner, Madame Jezebel, to let them in and while Joe hooks up with one of the women, Komodo finds Trixie and Jezebel leads Vaquero to the basement to get supplies but really tosses him to a Copperhead that is kept there. Vaquero is bit but manages to get away and warn the others but as Komodo, Trixie and Joe escape, they turn to find Vaquero has changed and Joe is forced to shoot him.

Back on the mountain, the others notice that Billy is missing but choose to keep going. When they reach the top, they find the place seemingly deserted and split up to find a way in. Daisy finds Billy trapped in a cage but before she can free him, Johnny shows up and stabs her before dragging her towards some Copperheads, and they proceed to turn her as a devastated Billy watches helplessly. Johnny tells Apocalypta that he has the heroes trapped and she unleashes her army to attack Desert Springs. Jack and Sirene show up and free Billy, then Jack is forced to kill Daisy, they then go through the mines after Johnny only to find themselves trapped by a horde of Copperheads.

They manage to escape and trap the Copperheads in the mine and head back to try and save Desert Springs. In Desert Springs, Apocalypta and Johnny lead the Copperheads through the town, killing anyone that tries to stop them or escape. Jack, Billy, Sirene, Komodo, Trixie and Joe try leading the Copperheads out of town but when Johnny attempts to shoot Sirene, Billy jumps in the way and is shot instead. He dies in Jack's arms.

Komodo kills Johnny, which enrages Apocalypta and she attacks Jack. Meanwhile, Joe, Komodo and Trixie keep trying to lure the Copperheads out of town, but Joe ends up getting bit and after he turns, he is blown up by a booby trap that he had prepared in case he was ever turned. Trixie is bit and when Komodo kisses her goodbye, she ends up biting him, so Komodo kills her and then himself. Jack manages to kill Apocalypta and as he watches the Copperheads feed on her body, he is bit by a small child. Sirene kills the child, then hands Jack his gun so he can kill himself. With Apocalypta dead, humanity has a chance to come back from the apocalypse while Sirene is shown to have given Jack a sky burial so his spirit can be reborn.

== Cast ==
- Nick Carter as Jack Sullivan
- Jeff Timmons as Billy Sullivan
- Carrie Keagan as Daisy Jane
- Debra Wilson as Apocalypta
- AJ McLean as Johnny Vermillion
- Joey Fatone as Whiskey Joe
- Howie Dorough as Vaquero
- Erik-Michael Estrada as Komodo
- Lauren Kitt-Carter as Sirene
- Jon Secada as Sheriff Cooper
- Chris Kirkpatrick as Mayor Shelby
- Jacob Underwood as Stamper
- Chloe Lattanzi as Trixie

Cameo appearances

- Frenchie Davis as Jezebel
- Art Alexakis as Jim
- Trevor Penick as Beau
- Gerardo Mejia as Lloyd
- Dan Miller as Butch
- Shifty Shellshock as Decker
- Delious Kennedy as Jean
- Tommy McCarthy as Deputy Dylan
- Keith Jeffery as Heineken
- Dylan Vox as Zeke

== Production ==
Nick Carter had been aspiring to make a film for years, after making several independent short films. In 2014, he started an Indiegogo campaign to fund his first feature-length film titled Evil Blessings. However, later that the director, Sxv'leithan Essex, died. Carter subsequently scrapped the film and replaced it with Dead 7, initially titled Dead West. In 2015, he landed the support of The Asylum, the production company behind Sharknado and other SyFy productions.

Filming began on August 20, 2015, outside the town of Anaconda, Montana at an 1880s ranch. Filming at the ranch laster a week and a half before moving to Butte, Montana. Butte locations in the film include The Dumas Brothel and The World Mining Museum. While scouting location in Montana to include in the film, one of Fox's production assistants showed him a photo of Our Lady of The Rockies, a statue overlooking the city of Butte. Fox liked the image so much that the final scene was rewritten to include Our Lady of The Rockies. About 250 locals from in and around the Anaconda and Butte areas were used as zombie extras, and an additional 250 Montanans showing up to audition from other cities across the state. Production finished on September 8, 2015.
