= Starflower (album) =

Studio album by Jennifer Paige
- Released: March 31, 2017
- Recorded: 2016
- Genre: Pop
- Length: 42:47
- Label: Tone Tree Music
- Producer: Jeremy Bose

Jennifer Paige chronology
Best Kept Secret (2008)	Starflower (2017)

Singles from Starflower
- 1. "The Devil's in the Details" Released: February 17, 2017; 2. "Let Me Love You" Released: March 3, 2017; 3. "Forget Me Not" Released: March 17, 2017

Starflower is the fourth studio album by American pop singer Jennifer Paige, released on March 31, 2017. Starflower was preceded by the release of three singles, "The Devil's in the Details", "Let Me Love You", and "Forget Me Not".

== Background ==
Paige partnered with producer Jeremy Bose to begin work on her fourth studio album in early 2016. With a crowdfunding campaign on Kickstarter, Paige raised almost $35,000 from her fans to cover album production costs.

== Critical reception ==
Starflower received positive critical reviews from the music press. Billboard's Andrew Unterberger praised the album as "one of the early year's best pop full-lengths". Starflower was also named as one of the 50 best albums of 2017 so far from Billboard.

=== Accolades ===
Publication	Rank	List
Billboard	21	50 Best Albums of 2017 So Far
Pop Magazine	43	Best Albums of 2017
The Yorkshire Times	17	Top 60 Albums Of 2017

== Track listing ==
Starflower track listing
No.	Title	Writer(s)	Producer(s)	Length
1.	"The Devil's in the Details"	Jennifer Paige; Jeremy Bose	Jeremy Bose	5:19
2.	"Forget Me Not"	Paige; Bose	Bose	3:10
3.	"Let Me Love You"	Paige; Bose; Dan Haseltine	Bose	3:46
4.	"Like a Bomb"	Paige; Bose	Bose	4:16
5.	"Up at Night"	Paige; Bose	Bose	3:52
6.	"Starflower"	Paige; Bose	Bose	4:19
7.	"To the Madness"	Paige; Bose	Bose	4:19
8.	"Can't Keep You Here" (featuring Coury Palermo)	Paige; Bose	Bose	3:12
9.	"January"	Paige; Bose	Bose	3:43
10.	"If We Be Still"	Paige; Bose	Bose	3:06
Total length:				39:08

Starflower – Digital special edition (bonus track)
No.	Title	Writer(s)	Producer(s)	Length
11.	"Crush" (acoustic version)	Andy Goldmark; Mark Mueller; Berny Cosgrove; Kevin Clark	Bose	3:38
Total length:				42:47
