= Twin Method =

English nu metal band

- Origin: Liverpool, England, UK
- Genres: Nu metal
- Years active: 2001–2009
- Labels: Crash Music Inc.
- Members: Deen Dean; Adam Carter; Ioannis Lamberti; Jason Potticary; Matt Carter; Robin Carter
- Past members: Brian Hill; Keith Hill

Twin Method was a nu metal band based in Liverpool, England.

== History ==
Twin Method was formed in 2001 by Deen Dean, Jason Potticary and brothers Keith and Brian Hill, who were later joined by Ioannis Lamberti. The band played some UK shows including the Medication UK Tour in 2001 and recorded an industry promotional EP 'Adjust and Control' produced by Logan Mader, whom they met on the medication tour.

In 2004, the band parted ways with Brian and Keith, recruited Adam and Matt and got to work writing. After a couple of home demos were circulated, it was announced that the band signed with Crash Music Inc. on 3 February 2006.

== Music ==
Twin Method's debut album, The Volume of Self, was released on 13 June 2006 and produced by ex-Machine Head/Soulfly guitarist Logan Mader. The music video for the album's single, "The Abrasive", was directed by Danny Roew in Hollywood.

Twin Method toured with artists including Medication, Drowning Pool on their 2006 US tour, American Head Charge on their 2006 European Occupation Tour, SOiL, Type O Negative, Five Finger Death Punch, Bloodsimple, and in 2007 they were part of the Family Values Tour headlined by Korn and Evanescence.

Twin Method split up in early 2009 before recording their second album.

== Members ==
- Deen Dean – guitar, production, songwriting (2001–2009)
- Adam Carter – drums (2003–2009)
- Ioannis Lamberti – clean vocals, production, songwriting (2001–2009)
- Jason Potticary – harsh/clean vocals, lyrics, production (2001–2009)
- Matt Carter – bass (2003–2009)
- Robin Carter – programming, backing vocals (2003–2009)

== Discography ==
- Adjust Then Control (unreleased album, 2003)
- The Volume of Self (2006)
