= Stranded (Plumb song) =

Song by Plumb

from the album candycoatedwaterdrops
- Released: April 13, 1999
- Genre: Pop rock
- Length: 3:39
- Label: Essential
- Songwriter(s): Matt Bronleewe, Tiffany Arbuckle Lee
- Producer(s): Glenn Rosenstein

"Stranded" is a song by American singer Plumb, released on the 1999 album candycoatedwaterdrops. It was included in films such as Dog Park and Drive Me Crazy (as well as on its soundtrack) and also on the compilation album WOW 2000.

In 2009, the song was re-recorded and included on her Beautiful History compilation album as "Stranded (2010)".

== Jennifer Paige cover ==
"Stranded"

Single by Jennifer Paige

from the album Positively Somewhere
- Released: June 17, 2002 (UK)
- Genre: Pop
- Length: 3:35
- Label: Edel
- Songwriter(s): Matt Bronleewe; Tiffany Arbuckle Lee
- Producer(s): Matt Bronleewe

Jennifer Paige singles chronology
"These Days" (2001)	"Stranded" (2002)	"Wasted" (2008)

"Stranded" was covered in 2001 by Jennifer Paige and was released as the second single from her second studio album Positively Somewhere (which also featured a cover of another Plumb song, "Here with Me"). This version became a massive airplay hit in some parts of Europe, most notably in Germany, where it reached top 10 position on airplay charts. It was also popular in Japan and Italy.

=== Music video ===
The music video features Paige finding herself stranded on an isolated island where her car runs out of fuel and she ends up wandering in the beaches all alone. The video was shot in Spain and directed by David Mould.

=== Charts ===
Chart (2002)	Peak position
Italy (FIMI)	36
Netherlands (Single Top 100)	83
Poland (Polish Airplay Chart)	19
Scotland (OCC)	89
UK Singles (OCC)	79
UK Indie (OCC)	12
