= Jennifer Paige (album) =

Studio album by Jennifer Paige
- Released: August 11, 1998
- Recorded: April 1996–Summer 1997
- Studios: Abbey Road Studios (London); Electric Lady Studios (New York City)
- Genre: Pop
- Length: 44:06
- Labels: Edel; Hollywood
- Producers: Jimmy Bralower; Andy Goldmark; Jamie Houston; Wayne Kirkpatrick; J.D. Martin

Jennifer Paige chronology
Jennifer Paige (1998)	Positively Somewhere (2001)

Singles from Jennifer Paige
- 1. "Crush" Released: June 9, 1998; 2. "Sober" Released: February 19, 1999; 3. "Always You" Released: July 12, 1999

Jennifer Paige is the debut studio album by American singer Jennifer Paige. It was released on August 11, 1998, through a joint venture between Edel America and Hollywood Records. Largely written and produced by Andy Goldmark, along with additional production from Wayne Kirkpatrick, Jimmy Bralower, J.D. Martin, and Jamie Houston, the album is a pop record that sports primarily midtempo tracks as well as handful of sumptuous ballads. Paige envisioned hopeful songs with elements of "old-school singing" for her debut.

Upon its release, the album earned positive reviews from music critics. Commercially, Jennifer Paige charted moderately, reaching number three on Billboard's US Top Heatseekers chart, but surpassed Gold status in Canada and went on to sell 900,000 units internationally. The album was preceded by it lead single "Crush," which became an international top ten hit and peaked at number one in Australia and New Zealand. In 1999, two further singles, "Sober" and "Always You" were released.

== Background ==
Raised in Atlanta, Georgia, Paige began singing at age of eight in coffeehouses and restaurants and playing piano at ten. After her highschool graduation, she joined a top 40 cover band and went on the road, singing in caissos and hotels for two years. In 1996, after meeting Crystal Bernard, who advised her to move to Los Angeles, Paige decided to relocate to California to launch a professional career in music. Though she initially struggled to make a living there, a dance remix one of her early demo recordings, a cover of Aretha Franklin's "Chain of Fools" (1967), garnered attention from German record label Edel Records, whose executives were looking to expand to North America and signed Paige as their first overseas act in October 1997. Through Edel, she intensified work on her debut album along with songwriter-producer Andy Goldmark. When "Crush" began receiving airplay, Hollywood Records offered to co-finance the project.

== Promotion ==
"Crush" released on June 16, 1998, as the first single from her debut album. "Crush" was an international hit that peaked at number three on the US Billboard Hot 100, earned a Gold certification from the Recording Industry Association of America, and sold 700,000 by the end of 1998. It reached number one in three countries: Australia (two weeks), Canada (five weeks) and New Zealand (one week). In Australia, the song is certified 2× Platinum for more than 140,000 copies shipped, while in New Zealand it is certified Gold for sales of over 5,000. In Europe "Crush" reached number four in France and the United Kingdom, going Gold in both countries, and number six in Ireland, the Netherlands and Norway. It also became a top-ten hit in Austria, Walloon Belgium, Denmark, Hungary and Spain, and it reached the top 20 in Flanders, Germany, Iceland, Sweden and Switzerland.

"Sober" was released on February 19, 1999, as the second single released from Jennifer Paige . It failed to chart in the United States but managed to enter top 70 in the United Kingdom, Australia, and New Zealand. Released on July 12, 1999, third and final single "Always You" reached number six on the Billboard's US Dance/Club Play chart. The same year, two tracks from the album — "Crush” and "Busted" — were featured on the soundtrack for the 1999 American romantic comedy film Simply Irresistible. The song "Somewhere, Someday" was later covered by boy band 'N Sync for 1999's Pokémon: The First Movie soundtrack.

== Critical reception ==
Professional ratings
Review scores
Source	Rating
AllMusic	3/5 stars

AllMusic editor Jaime Sunao Ikeda rated the album three out of five stars. He noted that Paige "unleashes a voice with great development potential" on Jennifer Paige "that holds its own with a solid pop effort, and splendidly provides her own background vocals on most tracks as well. Definitely one of the brighter pop talents to emerge in quite a while. Standout tracks on this fine debut release include the first single "Crush," "Get to Me," "Somewhere, Someday," and the stellar "Let It Rain"." Billboard editor Paul Verna wrote: "Set up by the runaway success of its first single, "Crush," this debut album by new-comer Jennifer Paige threatens to make a strong chart impact and launch a promising career. Although there are no other tracks on the album with the immediate appeal of "Crush" [...] cuts such as breezy pop number "Get to Me," ballad "Always You," funk workout "Busted," and melodrama-soaked ballad "Let It Rain" have the potential to make their presence felt at pop and AC radio. A young singer with the goods for mainstream success."

== Commercial performance ==
In the United States, Jennifer Paige debuted at number 168 on the US Billboard 200 on the week of August 29, 1998. It eventually peaked at number 139 the following week. By February 2000, the album had sold 300,000 units in the country. In Canada, Jennifer Paige was certified Gold by Music Canada for shipments of 50,000 units. In February 2000, The Wall Street Journal reported that Jennifer Paige had sold 900,000 copies worldwide.

== Track listing ==
Jennifer Paige track listing
No.	Title	Writer(s)	Producer(s)	Length
1.	"Crush"	Andy Goldmark; Mark Mueller; Berny Cosgrove; Kevin Clark	Goldmark; Jimmy Bralower	3:19
2.	"Questions"	Jennifer Paige; Goldmark; Mueller	Goldmark	4:14
3.	"Always You"	Goldmark; J.D. Martin	Goldmark; Martin	4:05
4.	"Get to Me"	Paige; Goldmark; Martin	Goldmark	4:00
5.	"Busted"	Goldmark; Mueller	Goldmark	3:48
6.	"Sober"	Goldmark; Wayne Kirkpatrick	Goldmark; Kirkpatrick	4:05
7.	"Between You and Me"	Goldmark; Jamie Houston	Goldmark; Houston	4:00
8.	"Let It Rain"	Goldmark; Mueller; Jason Hess	Goldmark	4:14
9.	"Just to Have You"	Paige; Goldmark; Mueller	Kirkpatrick	4:16
10.	"Somewhere, Someday"	Goldmark; Mueller	Goldmark	3:58
11.	"Always You" (bonus remix)	Goldmark; Martin	Goldmark; Martin	4:04
Total length:				44:06

Hong Kong special edition CD
No.	Title	Writer(s)	Producer(s)	Length
1.	"Crush"	Goldmark; Mueller; Cosgrove; Clark	Goldmark; Bralower	3:20
2.	"Always You" (radio mix)	Goldmark; Martin	Goldmark; Martin	3:44
3.	"Questions"	Paige; Goldmark; Mueller	Goldmark	4:15
4.	"Get to Me"	Paige; Goldmark; Martin	Goldmark	4:01
5.	"Busted"	Goldmark; Mueller		3:48
6.	"Sober" (radio edit)	Goldmark; Kirkpatrick	Goldmark; Kirkpatrick	4:04
7.	"Between You and Me"	Goldmark; Houston	Goldmark; Houston	4:00
8.	"Let It Rain"	Goldmark; Mueller; Hess	Goldmark	4:15
9.	"Just to Have You"	Paige; Goldmark; Mueller	Kirkpatrick	4:17
10.	"Somewhere, Someday"	Goldmark; Mueller	Goldmark	3:56
11.	"Always You" (the Hex Hector mix)	Goldmark; Martin	Goldmark; Martin; Hex Hector^{[A]}	4:03
12.	"Always You" (the ballad mix)	Goldmark; Martin	Goldmark; Martin	4:13
13.	"Always You" (original album version)	Goldmark; Martin	Goldmark; Martin	4:06
14.	"Crush" (David Morales club mix)	Goldmark; Mueller; Cosgrove; Clark	Goldmark; Bralower; David Morales^{[A]}	7:14
15.	"Crush" (Tiefschwarz Hollywood extended)	Goldmark; Mueller; Cosgrove; Clark	Goldmark; Bralower; Tiefschwarz^{[A]}	8:04

Hong Kong special edition VCD
No.	Title	Length
1.	"Always You" (music video)
2.	"Crush" (music video)
3.	"Sober" (music video)
4.	"Making of 'Sober' music video"
5.	"Questions and Answers"
6.	"Asian Tour Footage"

Notes

- ^{^[A]} denotes additional producer(s)

== Charts ==
Weekly chart performance for Jennifer Paige
Chart (1998)	Peak position
Australian Albums (ARIA)	44
Canada Top Albums/CDs (RPM)	41
Dutch Albums (Album Top 100)	73
German Albums (Offizielle Top 100)	41
Japanese Albums (Oricon)	70
Swiss Albums (Schweizer Hitparade)	40
UK Albums (Official Charts)	67
US Billboard 200	139
US Top Heatseekers (Billboard)	3

== Certifications and sales ==
Certifications and sales for Jennifer Paige
Region	Certification	Certified units/sales
Canada (Music Canada)	Gold	50,000^{^}
United States	—	300,000
Summaries
Worldwide as of February 2000	—	900,000
^{^} Shipments figures based on certification alone.
