= Beautiful Lie =

Single by Jennifer Paige featuring Nick Carter

from the album Best Kept Secret (Deluxe Edition)
- Released: October 29, 2009
- Genre: Pop
- Length: 3:22
- Label: Glor (SPV)
- Songwriters: Falk; Jennifer Paige; Nick Carter

Jennifer Paige singles chronology
"Ta Voix (The Calling)" (2008)	"Beautiful Lie" (2009)	"The Devil's in the Details" (2017)

Nick Carter singles chronology
"I Got You" (2003)	"'Beautiful Lie" (2009)	"Just One Kiss" (2011)

Music video
- "Beautiful Lie" on Youtube.com

"Beautiful Lie" is a pop song recorded by American singer Jennifer Paige and Nick Carter. The song was written by Falk, Paige and Carter. It was released as the first single from her deluxe edition album, Best Kept Secret. "Beautiful Lie" reached number 19 in Germany and number 49 in Austria.

== Background ==
The album Best Kept Secret was re-released as a deluxe edition on November 20, 2009, featuring a few new songs, including the new single, "Beautiful Lie" with Nick Carter.

== Track listing ==
1. "Beautiful Lie" — 3:22
2. "Beautiful Lie" (Extended Mix) — 4:11

== Charts ==
Chart (2009)	Peak position
Austria (Ö3 Austria Top 40)	49
Germany (GfK)	19
