= I'm Taking Off =

Studio album by Nick Carter
- Released: May 24, 2011
- Recorded: 2010–2011
- Genre: Pop; pop rock
- Length: 42:10
- Label: Kaotic INC; 604; Sony
- Producer: David Jordan; Carl Falk; Rami Yacoub; Matthew Gerrard; Dan Muckala; Brent Kutzle; Noel Zancanella; Midi Mafia

Nick Carter chronology
Now or Never (2002)	I'm Taking Off (2011)	Nick & Knight (2014)

Singles from I'm Taking Off
- 1. "Just One Kiss" Released: January 28, 2011; 2. "I'm Taking Off" Released: May 31, 2011; 3. "Love Can't Wait" Released: June 21, 2011; 4. "Burning Up" Released: January 24, 2012

I'm Taking Off is the second solo album released in 2011 by Backstreet Boys member Nick Carter. The album was initially released on his own record label, Kaotic INC. The album sold over 20,000 copies during first week in Japan alone.

== Background ==
Following the conclusion of the recording of the Backstreet Boys studio album This Is Us, Carter entered the studio to record solo material for a possible second album. On November 28, 2010, a new song, "Just One Kiss", was unveiled to Japanese radio. The song became an immediate success, peaking at number 12 on the Japan Hot 100. Thus, Carter compiled a series of tracks he had recorded, and announced that his second studio album would be released on February 2, 2011, in Japan. On the week of release, the album sold 9,928 copies, peaking at number 8, before dropping to number 17 the following week, selling 4,103 copies. In its third week on the chart, it sold a further 3,100 copies, dropping to number 30. A deluxe version of the album, with a bonus DVD, was made available on February 9.

As such, Carter decide to release the album in the United States due its success in Japan. The US release date was set for May 24, 2011. Carter also announced that the single "Just One Kiss" would receive a US release on April 5. The US version of the album replaces the track "Jewel In Our Hearts" with a new track, entitled "Remember". The US version also included a dance remix of the single "Just One Kiss". A deluxe version of the album, containing the contents of the Japanese Bonus DVD, was also made available. The album peaked at number 14 on the US Billboard Chart.

Europe became the next region to receive a release. "Just One Kiss" was released on April 29, before the album received a release on June 2. The European version of the album does not include "Jewel In Our Hearts", "Remember" or the dance remix of "Just One Kiss", however, includes two further tracks - a new composition entitled "Coma", and Carter's 2009 duet with Jennifer Paige, "Beautiful Lie". The European version of the album comes packaged in a limited edition digipak, with postcard, poster, full album booklet, four additional videos and further enhanced content.

Canada became the last country to receive a release. However, this time, a brand new song, "Love Can't Wait", was released as the album's lead single on June 21. The album was released on August 9. The Canadian version includes "Love Can't Wait" as a bonus track, but does not include "Jewel In Our Hearts", "Coma", "Remember", "Beautiful Lie" or the dance remix of "Just One Kiss". The album peaked at number 2 on the Canadian Digital Chart and number 12 at Canadian Albums Chart.

On November 15, 2011, a new version of the album was released digitally on iTunes worldwide, entitled Relaunched and Remixed. It includes a total of 16 remixes, comprising the tracks "I'm Taking Off", "So Far Away", "Love Can't Wait", "Not the Other Guy", "Just One Kiss" and "Falling Down".

== Track listing ==
I'm Taking Off track listing
No.	Title	Writer(s)	Producer(s)	Length
1.	"Burning Up" (featuring Britton "Briddy" Shaw)	Nick Carter, Carl Falk, Savan Kotecha, Rami Yacoub	Falk, Rami Yacoub	3:38
2.	"Not the Other Guy"	Carter, Matthew Gerrard, Tebey	Gerrard	2:57
3.	"So Far Away"	Carter, Dan Muckala, Jason Ingram	Muckala	3:32
4.	"Addicted"	Carter, Gerrard, Mischke	Gerrard	4:32
5.	"Special"	Carter, Cardenas, Newble, Gambetta, Risto, Nugent	Midi Mafia	4:04
6.	"Falling Down"	Carter, Gerrard, Mischke	Gerrard	3:59
7.	"Just One Kiss"	Carter, Muckala, Ingram	Muckala	3:32
8.	"Great Divide"	Carter, Toby Gad	Toby Gad	4:09
9.	"Nothing Left to Lose"	Carter, Gad	Toby Gad	4:16
10.	"Falling in Love Again"	Carter, Cardenas, Noel Zancanella, Kutzle	Brent Kutzle, Zancanella	3:34
11.	"I'm Taking Off"	Carter, Gerrard, Mischke	Gerrard	3:58
Total length:				42:10

Japanese standard edition bonus track
No.	Title	Writer(s)	Producer(s)	Length
12.	"Jewel in Our Hearts"	Noriyuki Makihara, Motoyama Kiyoharu	Mischke	5:03
Total length:				47:12

Japanese tour edition bonus tracks
No.	Title	Length
13.	"Not the Other Guy" (Salius V remix)
14.	"So Far Away" (Romey B remix)
15.	"Falling Down" (Savacan extended club remix)
16.	"Just One Kiss" (Dezzo and Tenenbaum remix)
17.	"I'm Taking Off" (DJ Kevin Larock remix)

German bonus tracks
No.	Title	Writer(s)	Producer(s)	Length
12.	"Coma"	Dante Thomas, Marcus Brosch	Brosch	3:28
13.	"Beautiful Lie" (duet with Jennifer Paige)	Carter, Paige, Falk	Falk	3:22
Total length:				49:00

American deluxe edition bonus tracks
No.	Title	Writer(s)	Producer(s)	Length
12.	"Remember"	Carter, Carl Falk, Sofia Toufa	Carl Falk	3:43
13.	"Just One Kiss" (Dezzo and Tenenbaum Remix)	Carter, Muckala, Ingram	Marcus Brosch, David Paulicke	6:48
Total length:				52:41

Canadian edition bonus track
No.	Title	Writer(s)	Producer(s)	Length
5.	"Love Can't Wait"	Carter, Shawn Desman, Tebey	Shawn Desman	3:46
Total length:				45:56

Nick Carter official store bonus download
No.	Title	Length
13.	"I Gotta Get With You"	4:10

Re-launched and Remixed album
No.	Title	Length
1.	"I'm Taking Off" (DJ Kevin Larock Remix)
2.	"I'm Taking Off" (Approaching Nirvana Remix)
3.	"I'm Taking Off" (B. Sensei Remix)
4.	"So Far Away" (Romey B. Remix)
5.	"So Far Away" (Tinok Dubai Remix)
6.	"So Far Away" (Michael Van Erp Remix)
7.	"Love Can't Wait" (Stereotheif Remix)
8.	"Love Can't Wait" (Maxwell B Superstar Remix)
9.	"Not the Other Guy" (Saulius V Remix)
10.	"Not the Other Guy" (Incorporated Element Remix)
11.	"Not the Other Guy"" (TinoVinco Remix)
12.	"Falling Down" (Savacan Extended Club Remix)
13.	"Falling Down" (Peaboo Remix)
14.	"Falling Down" (Final Conflict Remix)
15.	"Just One Kiss" (Dezzo and Tenenbaum Remix)
16.	"Just One Kiss" (Dezzo and Tenenbaum Radio Edit)

== Personnel ==
Credits for I'm Taking Off adapted from AllMusic.

- Craig Bauer – mixing
- Chuck Butler – bass guitar, editing, guitar
- Nick Carter – composer
- Omar Cruz – photography
- Dan Deurloo – assistant
- Dirty Swift – mixing
- Mark Endert – mixing
- Carl Falk – composer, engineer, keyboards, mixing, producer, programming
- Travis Ference – engineer, mixing
- Toby Gad – composer, engineer, instrumentation, mixing, musician, producer
- Charlie Gambetta – composer
- Matthew Gerrard – acoustic guitar, bass guitar, composer, electric guitar, keyboards, producer, programming
- Lori Graf – executive producer
- Keiko Imaizumi – liner notes
- Jason Ingram – composer
- Doug Johnson – assistant
- Jordan Keller – executive producer
- Savan Kotecha – composer
- Brent Kutzle – composer, Engineer, guitar, keyboards, producer, programming, vocals
- Adam Lester – guitar
- Noriyuki Makihara – composer, producer, vocals
- Stephen Marcussen – mastering
- The MIDI Mafia – producer
- Monte Neuble – musician
- Seiji Motoyama – composer, vocal arrangement
- Dan Muckala – arranger, background vocals, composer, engineer, mixing, producer, programming, vocal producer
- Steven Mudd – engineer
- Lamonte Newble – composer
- Waynne Nugent – composer
- Greg Patterson – design, layout
- Kevin Risto – composer
- Reggie Rojo Jr. – engineer
- Yoshiyuki Sahashi – autoharp, guitar
- Takeshi Takizawa – engineer
- Jason Turner – executive producer
- Rami Yacoub – composer
- Noel Zancanella – composer, drums, engineer, keyboards, producer, programming

== Charts ==
Chart performance for I'm Taking Off
Chart (2011)	Peak position
Canadian Albums (Billboard)	12
German Albums (Offizielle Top 100)	46
Japanese Albums (Oricon)	8

== Release history ==
Release history for I'm Taking Off
Country	Date	Label
Japan	February 2, 2011	Sony Music Japan
United States	May 24, 2011	Kaotic, Sony Music
Europe	June 3, 2011	Glor Music, Warner Music Central Europe
Canada	August 9, 2011	604, Universal Music Canada
