= Danny Roew =

American music video and film director

Danny Roew is an American music video and film director.

== Filmography ==
=== Music videos ===
- "Destiny," Chakra (2003)
- "Happy," Ryan Oliver (2004)
- "It Isn't Me," Society 1 (2005)
- "Where Will You Go," Detroit Mutant Radio (2006)
- "The Abrasive," Twin Method (2006)
- "This Is The End," Society 1 (2006)
- "We R In Need of A Musical Revolution," Esthero (2006)
- "Just One Kiss", Nick Carter (2010/2011)
- "Burning Up", Nick Carter featuring Britton "Briddy" Shaw (2011)

=== Documentaries ===
- Diary of a Filmmaker: Havoc (Producer) (2001)
- Tha Westside (Producer) (2006)
- Within the Cavern (2006)
- Caverns of the Mojave: An Expedition with Real Cavers (2006)

=== Short films ===
- Lost Thoughts (2000)
- Be Your Own Boss (2001)
- Dog Lovers (2008)

=== Feature films ===
- Shotgun Wedding (2013)

=== Television films ===
- Dead 7 | Syfy (2016)
