= Sober (Jennifer Paige song) =

1999 single by Jennifer Paige

Single by Jennifer Paige

from the album Jennifer Paige
- B-side: "Get to Me"
- Released: February 1999
- Studio: The Beanstalk (Franklin, Tennessee); Final Approach (Encino, Los Angeles)
- Length: 4:00
- Label: Edel
- Songwriters: Andy Goldmark; Wayne Kirkpatrick
- Producers: Andy Goldmark; Wayne Kirkpatrick

Jennifer Paige singles chronology
"Crush" (1998)	"Sober" (1999)	"Always You" (1999)

Music video
- "Sober" on YouTube

"Sober" is a song co-written by Andy Goldmark and Wayne Kirkpatrick and performed by American singer Jennifer Paige. It was released in February 1999 as the second single from her debut studio album, Jennifer Paige. It failed to chart in the United States but entered the top 75 in the United Kingdom, Australia, and New Zealand.

== Music video ==
The music video was first shown in April 1999 and was directed by American director Chris Applebaum.

== Track listings ==
Australian CD single

1. "Sober" (radio edit)
2. "Crush" (original version)
3. "Crush" (David Morales remix)
4. "Sober" (instrumental)
5. "Get to Me" (album version)

UK CD single

1. "Sober" (radio edit) – 4:00
2. "Sober" (instrumental) – 4:02
3. "Get to Me" (album version) – 4:00

UK cassette single and European CD single

1. "Sober" (radio edit) – 4:00
2. "Sober" (instrumental) – 4:00

== Credits and personnel ==
Credits are lifted from the Australian CD single liner notes.

Studios

- Recorded at The Beanstalk (Franklin, Tennessee) and Final Approach (Encino, Los Angeles)
- Mixed at Barking Doctor Studio (Mount Kisco, New York)
- Mastered at More Than One

Personnel

- Andy Goldmark – music, words, production, arrangement, recording (Final Approach)
- Wayne Kirkpatrick – music, words, production, arrangement
- Tom Laune – recording (Beanstalk)
- Mick Guzauski – mixing
- Tom Bender – mixing assistance
- Rhys Moody – mastering

== Charts ==
Chart (1999)	Peak position
Australia (ARIA)	58
Germany (GfK)	78
New Zealand (Recorded Music NZ)	45
Scotland Singles (Official Charts)	70
UK Singles (Official Charts)	68
UK Indie (Official Charts)	11

== Release history ==
Region	Date	Format(s)	Label(s)	Ref.
Australia	February 1999	CD	Edel	
United Kingdom	March 8, 1999	CD; cassette	Edel; Ear Music	
