= Always You (Jennifer Paige song) =

Single by Jennifer Paige

from the album Jennifer Paige
- B-side: "Always You (The Ballad Mix)"
- Released: July 22, 1999
- Recorded: 1999
- Genre: Pop
- Length: 3:42
- Label: Hollywood
- Songwriters: Andy Goldmark; JD Martin
- Producers: Andy Goldmark; JD Martin; Groove Brothers; Mick Guzauski

Jennifer Paige singles chronology
"Sober" (1999)	"Always You" (1999)	"These Days" (2001)

Music video
- "Always You" on Youtube.com

"Always You" is a pop song recorded by American singer Jennifer Paige. It was released in July 1999 as the third single released from her debut studio album Jennifer Paige. The song was written by Andy Goldmark and JD Martin. For this single, Always You was remixed by Groove Brothers. The B-side is replayed by Mick Guzauski. "Always You" reached number six on the Billboard Dance/Club Play chart.

== Track listing ==
CD single

1. "Always You" (Radio Mix) (Groove Brothers Remix) — 3:42
2. "Always You" (The Ballad Mix) — 4:10

CD maxi

1. "Always You" (Radio Mix) (Groove Brothers Remix) — 3:42
2. "Always You" (The Ballad Mix) — 4:10
3. "Always You" (The Hex Mix) — 3:58
4. "Always You" (Instrumental) — 3:37

== Music video ==
The music video was released by Markus Nagel. This music video tells about a man who played a VHS. In this VHS, he's seeing Jennifer who's filming her trip journey between desert, boat travel etc... Later on joined by her boyfriend, the man who sees the movie.

== Remixes and others versions ==
This song was remixed in a clubbing style by Hex Hector and became a US Hot Dance/Club Play top ten. The original version and the remix of strobe were available only in the first studio album of Jennifer Paige. The version of Mick Guzauski is also available in cd and maxi single.

== Charts ==
Chart (1999)	Peak position
Germany (GfK)	76
UK Singles (The Official Charts Company)	81
US Billboard Hot Dance/Club Play	6
