= Best Kept Secret (Jennifer Paige album) =

Studio album by Jennifer Paige
- Released: April 25, 2008
- Genre: Pop; pop rock
- Length: 49:47
- Label: Glor (SPV)

Jennifer Paige chronology
Flowers (The Hits Collection) (2003)	Best Kept Secret (2008)	Starflower (2017)

Singles from Jennifer Paige
- 1. "Wasted" Released: March 23, 2008; 2. "Underestimated" Released: May 5, 2008; 3. "Ta Voix (The Calling)" Released: December 15, 2008; 4. "Beautiful Lie" Released: October 29, 2009

Best Kept Secret is the third studio album by American singer Jennifer Paige. It was released on April 25, 2008 in Germany and selected European countries. The first single was "Wasted", the second single was "Underestimated" and the third single was "The Calling". The album was re-released as a deluxe edition on November 20, 2009 featuring a few new songs, including the new single, "Beautiful Lie" with Nick Carter.

== Critical reception ==
Professional ratings
Review scores
Source	Rating
laut.de	2/5 stars
CDstarts.de	6.5/10

Albert Ranner from CDstarts.de found that with Best Kept Secret, Paige "should be able to get herself somewhat back into the conversation, even if many parts are reminiscent of artists like Delta Goodrem or Natalie Imbruglia. That doesn't make Best Kept Secret a bad album, though." laut.de editor Artur Schulz rated the album two ouf of five stars. He wrote: "All in all, there's too little that truly stands out in Best Kept Secret. A small handful of thoroughly successful tracks are outweighed by too much mediocrity. It's not a bad album — but it's not a consistently strong one either. Jennifer Paige's voice and artistic presence clearly deserve a more high-quality setting. Above all, producers should refrain from overloading Jennifer's clear, powerful, and expressive voice with excessive sonic clutter."

== Track listing ==
1. "Feel the Love" – 03:36 (Paige, Moring)
2. "Best Kept Secret" – 03:03 (Paige, Robinson, Björklund)
3. "The Calling" – 04:12 (Paige, Landon)
4. "Here in the Sun" – 04:33 (Paige, Beiden)
5. "Sugarcoated" – 03:30 (Paige, Beiden)
6. "Broken Things" – 03:57 (Miller)
7. "Underestimated" – 03:48 (Paige, Ries)
8. "Bloom" – 03:52 (Paige, Beiden)
9. "I Do" – 03:33 (Paige, Booker)
10. "Downpour" – 04:23 (Paige, Jay, Pedersen)
11. "Wasted" – 03:38 (Hawkes, Thoresen)
12. "Be Free" – 03:33 (Paige, von Schlieffen, Moring)
13. "Mercy" – 04:09 (Paige, Stenzel, Kadish)

2009 Re-release

1. "Beautiful Lie" (with Nick Carter) – 3:22 (Falk, Paige, Carter)
2. "Feel the Love" – 03:36 (Paige, Moring)
3. "Best Kept Secret" – 03:03 (Paige, Robinson, Björklund)
4. "The Calling" – 04:12 (Paige, Landon)
5. "Here in the Sun" – 04:33 (Paige, Beiden)
6. "Sugarcoated" – 03:30 (Paige, Beiden)
7. "Broken Things" – 03:57 (Miller)
8. "Underestimated" – 03:48 (Paige, Ries)
9. "Bloom" – 03:52 (Paige, Beiden)
10. "I Do" – 03:33 (Paige, Booker)
11. "Downpour" – 04:23 (Paige, Jay, Pedersen)
12. "Wasted" – 03:38 (Hawkes, Thoresen)
13. "Be Free" – 03:33 (Paige, von Schlieffen, Moring)
14. "Crush" 2009 Remix by DJ Kore – 03:26 (Mueller, Goldmark, Clark, Cosgrove)
15. "Mercy" – 04:09 (Paige, Stenzel, Kadish)
