= Just One Kiss (Nick Carter song) =

Single by Nick Carter

from the album I'm Taking Off
- Released: 28 January 2011
- Recorded: 2010–2011
- Genre: Pop
- Length: 3:32
- Label: Sony Music Entertainment
- Songwriter(s): Nick Carter, Daniel Muckala, Jason Ingram

Nick Carter singles chronology
| "Beautiful Lie" (2009) | "Just One Kiss" (2011) | "Love Can't Wait" (2011) |

"Just One Kiss" is a song by American singer-songwriter Nick Carter. It was written by Carter, Jason Ingram and Daniel Muckala, and produced for Carter's second studio album, I'm Taking Off. "Just One Kiss" was released on January 28, 2011, as the album's first single, peaking at #12 on the Japan Hot 100 and #84 in Tokyo. The music video was directed by Danny Roew. The video contains scenes of Carter singing on the beach.

== Track listing ==
1. "Just One Kiss" (Radio Edit) - 3:34
2. "Just One Kiss" (Club Mix) - 6:49
3. "Just One Kiss" (Club Mix) (Radio Cut) - 3:46
4. "Just One Kiss" (Official Video)

== Charts ==
| Chart (2011) | Peak position |
|---|---|
| Japan Hot 100 | 12 |
| Japan Adult Contemporary Airplay | 5 |
| Japan Hot Top Airplay | 7 |
| Japan Digital and Airplay Overseas | 7 |
| German Singles Chart | 75 |
| Austria Singles Top 75 | 55 |
| U.S Billboard Bubbling Under Hot 100 Singles | 6 |
