= Now or Never (Nick Carter album) =

Studio album by Nick Carter
- Released: October 29, 2002 (US)
- Recorded: February – September 2002
- Genre: Pop, pop rock
- Length: 43:42
- Label: Jive
- Producer: David Kahne, Per Aldeheim, Martin Brammer, Gary Clark, Matthew Gerrard, Steve Mac, Max Martin, The Matrix, Rami, Josh Schwartz, Mark Taylor, Brian Kierulf

Nick Carter chronology
Before the Backstreet Boys 1989–1993 (2002)	Now or Never (2002)	I'm Taking Off (2011)

Singles from Now or Never
- 1. "Help Me" Released: September 3, 2002; 2. "Do I Have to Cry for You" Released: November 11, 2002; 3. "I Got You" Released: February 14, 2003

Professional ratings
Review scores
Source	Rating
AllMusic	2.5/5 stars
Entertainment Weekly	C
Slant Magazine	1/5 stars
USA Today	1.5/4 stars

Now or Never is the debut solo album by Nick Carter, best known as a member of the Backstreet Boys, released on October 29, 2002 by Jive Records. The album debuted at #17 in its first week on the Billboard 200, selling some 70,000 copies during first week in U.S. It fell out of the top 50 in its second week, but sold well enough to be certified Gold by the RIAA in December 2002. Two singles were released from the album, neither of which had any impact on the US charts. The first single, "Help Me", reach number 9 on the Canadian Singles Chart. "I Got You" was a minor hit in Europe and Southeast Asia. A sneak preview of the album was attached to the end of the fourth album of Carter's younger brother Aaron, Another Earthquake.

== Background ==
In 2002, when the Backstreet Boys expressed a strong desire to leave their management company, The Firm, Carter chose to remain with them to manage his solo career. As the group began recording their new album without him, he started working on his first solo album. Now or Never was released on October 29, 2002. The album reached No. 17 on the Billboard 200; further, it was certified gold in both the United States and Canada. The lead single, "Help Me" achieved considerable worldwide success while the other single, "I Got You" was a minor hit in Europe while "Do I Have to Cry for You" became popular in the Philippines. The album made the charts in several other countries as well. Carter also launched a worldwide tour in support of the album.

== Track listing ==
No.	Title	Writer(s)	Producer(s)	Length
1.	"Help Me"	Matthew Gerrard; Michele Vice-Maslin	Matthew Gerrard	3:09
2.	"My Confession"	Nick Carter; Gary Clark; Martin Brammer	Gary Clark; Martin Brammer	3:50
3.	"I Stand for You"	Carter; Brian Kierulf; Josh Schwartz	Brian Kierulf; Josh Schwartz	3:07
4.	"Do I Have to Cry for You"	Carter; Kierulf; Schwartz	Brian Kierulf; Josh Schwartz	3:37
5.	"Girls in the USA" (featuring Mr. Vegas)	Carter; Kierulf; Schwartz	Steve Mac	4:07
6.	"I Got You"	Max Martin; Rami Yacoub	Max Martin; Rami Yacoub	3:57
7.	"Is It Saturday Yet?"	Carter; Clark; Brammer; Stephen Lunt	Gary Clark; Martin Brammer	3:14
8.	"Blow Your Mind"	Martin; Yacoub; Per Aldeheim	Max Martin; Rami Yacoub; Per Aldeheim	3:34
9.	"Miss America"	Anna-Lena Gibson; Mark Taylor; Steve Lee	Mark Taylor	3:55
10.	"I Just Wanna Take You Home"	Martin; Yacoub; Aldeheim	Max Martin; Rami Yacoub; Aldeheim	2:55
11.	"Heart Without a Home (I'll Be Yours)"	Steve Mac; Wayne Hector	Steve Mac	4:46
12.	"Who Needs the World"	Charlie Midnight; Graham Edwards; Lauren Christy; Scott Spock	The Matrix	3:30

International bonus tracks
No.	Title	Writer(s)	Producer(s)	Length
13.	"Scandalicious"	Carter; Daniel Gibson; Douglas Carr; Julius Bengtsson	Douglas Carr	2:54
14.	"End of Forever"	Carter; Guy Chambers	Guy Chambers; Steve Power	3:48

Japanese bonus tracks
No.	Title	Writer(s)	Producer(s)	Length
13.	"Scandalicious"	Carter; Daniel Gibson; Douglas Carr; Julius Bengtsson	Douglas Carr	2:54
14.	"Forever Rebel"	Carter; Wayne Johnson; Phil Thornalley	Phil Thornalley	3:48

Special edition bonus DVD
No.	Title	Length
1.	"Nick at the Beach"
2.	"Nick Classic Car Interview"
3.	"Nick in Stockholm"
4.	"Weblink"

== Personnel ==
Credits for Now or Never adapted from AllMusic.

- Per Aldeheim – engineer, guitar, guitar engineer, producer
- Alex G. – digital editing
- Dave Arch – string arrangements
- Keith B. Armstrong – mixing assistant
- Elan Bongiorno – make-up
- Martin Brammer – engineer, mixing, Pro Tools, producer, programming, vocals (background)
- Michael Brauer – mixing
- Nick Carter – illustrations, vocals (background)
- Alison Clark – vocals (background)
- Gary Clark – bass, engineer, guitar, keyboards, mixing, Pro Tools, producer, programming, vocals (background)
- Tom Coyne – mastering
- Michelle John Douglas – vocals (background)
- Geoff Dugmore – drums
- Rickard Evensand – drums
- Nick Friend – assistant
- Elisa Garcia – art direction, design
- Paul Gendler – guitar
- Matthew Gerrard – arranger, engineer, instrumentation, producer, programming, vocal arrangement
- Stefan Glaumann – mixing
- Steve Harvey – percussion
- Wayne Hector – vocals (background)
- Peter Kahm – bass
- Fridrik Karlsson – guitar
- Brian Kierulf – engineer
- Peter Kvint – guitar
- Chris Laws – drums, engineer
- Steve Lee – guitar (acoustic), vocals (background)
- Chris Lord-Alge – mixing
- Steve Lunt - A&R, composer
- Steve Mac – arranger, keyboards, mixing, producer
- Anthony Mandler – photography
- Max Martin – engineer, mixing, producer, vocal engineer, vocals (background)
- The Matrix – arranger, engineer, mixing, producer
- Pablo Munguia – vocal engineer
- Jackie Murphy – art direction
- Esbjörn Öhrwall – guitar
- Steve Pearce – bass
- Adam Phillips – guitar (electric)
- Daniel Pursey – assistant engineer, percussion
- Rami – engineer, mixing, producer
- Cesar Ramirez – assistant engineer, assistant vocal engineer
- Brandy St. John – stylist
- Christian Saint Val – assistant engineer
- Sank – engineer
- Andrew Scarth – engineer
- José Carlos Schwartz – bass, engineer, producer, vocals (background)
- Mark Taylor – engineer, mixing, producer
- Matt Tryggestad – vocal arrangement
- Michael Tucker – engineer
- Jeff Vereb – assistant engineer
- Jong Uk Yoon – assistant engineer

== Charts ==
Chart performance for Now or Never
Chart (2002)	Peak position
Austrian Albums (Ö3 Austria)	66
Dutch Albums (Album Top 100)	41
German Albums (Offizielle Top 100)	25
Italian Albums (FIMI)	44
Japanese Albums (Oricon)	4
Spanish Albums (PROMUSICAE)	25
Swedish Albums (Sverigetopplistan)	41
Swiss Albums (Swiss Hitparade)	85
UK Albums (OCC)	91
US Billboard 200	17

== Certifications ==
Certifications for Now or Never
Region	Certification	Certified units/sales
Canada (Music Canada)	Gold	50,000^{^}
Japan (RIAJ)	Gold	100,000^{^}
United States (RIAA)	Gold	500,000^{^}
^{^} Shipments figures based on certification alone.
