= Before the Backstreet Boys 1989–1993 =

Compilation album by Nick Carter
- Released: October 1, 2002 (U.S.)
- Recorded: 1989–1993
- Genre: Pop
- Label: Dyenamic Discs
- Producer: Andrew Winton and Mark J. Dye

Nick Carter chronology
Before the Backstreet Boys 1989–1993 (2002)	Now or Never (2002)

Before the Backstreet Boys 1989–1993 is the unofficial, independently released demo album released by Backstreet Boys member Nick Carter. The songs were recorded by Carter from 1989 to 1993 and are mostly covers of songs from the 1950s to 1980s. The song "Hard to Get" was written by Mark J. Dye for Carter and his former singing partner, Malia Tuaileva. Tuaileva appears in a duet on the album and also sings solo on the track "Mansion in Malibu".

== Track listing ==
1. "Summer!" 3:33
2. "Love Is a Wonderful Thing"
3. "More Today Than Yesterday"
4. "Hard to Get" (duet with Malia Tuaileva)
5. "Rhythm of My Heart" 3:16
6. "Runaround Sue"
7. "Lights"
8. "Breaking Up Is Hard to Do"
9. "Just a Gigolo" / "I Ain't Got Nobody" 4:30
10. "Jailhouse Rock"
11. "God Bless the U.S.A." 3:12
12. "Uptown Girl"
13. "Rockin' Around the Christmas Tree"
14. "Mansion in Malibu" (Malia solo)
15. "The Star-Spangled Banner"
16. "Hard to Get" (Nick solo version)
17. "Sunday Morning Bells" 2:45
