= I Got You (Nick Carter song) =

Single by Nick Carter

from the album Now or Never
- B-side: "Rockstar Baby"
- Released: February 14, 2003
- Studio: Maratone Studios (Stockholm, Sweden)
- Genre: Pop
- Length: 3:57
- Label: Jive Records
- Songwriters: Max Martin, Rami Yacoub

Nick Carter singles chronology
"Help Me" (2002)	"I Got You" (2003)	"Beautiful Lie" (2009)

"I Got You" is the third single by American singer, Nick Carter. It was written by Max Martin and Rami Yacoub for Carter's first studio album, Now or Never. "I Got You" was released on February 14, 2003.

== Formats and track listings ==
UK CD1

1. "I Got You" (Album Version) - 3:57
2. "Rockstar Baby" - 3:14

UK CD2

1. "I Got You" (Album Version) - 3:57
2. "Is It Saturday Yet?" - 3:13
3. "Rockstar Baby" - 3:14
4. "I Got You" (Enhanced Video) - 3:55

== Charts ==
Chart (2003)	Peak position
Austria (Ö3 Austria Top 40)	74
Belgium (Ultratop 50 Flanders)	41
Germany (GfK)	57
Hungary (Single Top 40)	10
Italy (FIMI)	23
Italy (Musica e dischi)	30
Netherlands (Dutch Top 40 Tipparade)	13
Netherlands (Single Top 100)	71
Sweden (Sverigetopplistan)	58
Switzerland (Schweizer Hitparade)	91
