= Help Me (Nick Carter song) =

2002 single by Nick Carter

Single by Nick Carter

from the album Now or Never
- B-side: "End of Forever"; "Payback"
- Released: September 3, 2002
- Recorded: 2002
- Genre: Pop
- Length: 3:11
- Label: Jive Records
- Songwriters: Matthew Gerrard, M. Vice

Nick Carter singles chronology
"Help Me" (2002)	"Do I Have to Cry for You" (2002)

"Help Me" is the debut solo single by American singer Nick Carter. It was written by Matthew Gerrard and M. Vice for Carter's first studio album, Now or Never (2002). "Help Me" was released on June 24, 2002 and reached the top 10 in Canada, Denmark, El Salvador, Guatemala, Italy and Spain.

== Track listings and formats ==
- Maxi CD single
1. "Help Me" (Album Version) – 3:11
2. "Help Me" (Instrumental) – 3:11
3. "End of Forever" – 4:10
4. "Payback" – 3:30
- EU CD 1
1. "Help Me" (Album Version) – 3:11
2. "Help Me" (Instrumental) – 3:11
- EU cassette
1. "Help Me" (Album Version) – 3:11
2. "End of Forever" – 4:10
3. "Help Me" (Instrumental) – 3:11
- EU CD 2
1. "Help Me" (Album Version) – 3:11
2. "End of Forever" – 4:10
3. "Payback" – 3:30

== Charts ==
=== Weekly charts ===
Weekly chart performance for "Help Me" by Nick Carter
Chart (2002)	Peak position
Australia (ARIA)	30
Austria (Ö3 Austria Top 40)	26
Belgium (Ultratop 50 Flanders)	38
Belgium (Ultratip Bubbling Under Wallonia)	13
Canada (Nielsen SoundScan)	9
Denmark (Tracklisten)	6
El Salvador (Notimex)	5
Europe (Eurochart Hot 100)	19
Europe (European Hit Radio)	28
Germany (GfK)	18
Guatemala (Notimex)	3
Ireland (IRMA)	44
Italy (FIMI)	9
Italy (Musica e dischi)	16
Italy Airplay (Music & Media)	10
Netherlands (Dutch Top 40)	30
Netherlands (Single Top 100)	24
New Zealand (Recorded Music NZ)	48
Poland Airplay (Polish Airplay Charts)	19
Scottish Singles Sales (Official Charts)	19
Spain (Promusicae)	7
Spain Airplay (Top 40 Radio)	8
Sweden (Sverigetopplistan)	20
Switzerland (Schweizer Hitparade)	33
UK Singles (Official Charts)	17
UK Indie (Official Charts)	1
US Pop Airplay (Billboard)	36

=== Year-end charts ===
Chart (2002)	Position
Canada (Nielsen SoundScan)	85

== Release history ==
Release dates and formats for "Help Me"
Region	Date	Format(s)	Label(s)	Ref.
United States	September 3, 2002	Contemporary hit radio	Jive	
United States	October 7, 2002	Hot adult contemporary	Jive	
