= Love Can't Wait (Nick Carter song) =

Single by Nick Carter

from the album I'm Taking Off
- Released: June 21, 2011
- Recorded: 2010–2011
- Genre: Pop
- Length: 3:32
- Label: Sony Music Entertainment
- Songwriters: Nick Carter, Shawn Desman, Tebey
- Producer: Shawn Desman

Nick Carter singles chronology
"Just One Kiss" (2010)	"Love Can't Wait" (2011)	"One More Time" (2014)

"Love Can't Wait" is a song by American singer-songwriter Nick Carter, released as the lead Canadian single from his second studio album, I'm Taking Off. The single was released on June 21, 2011. The song only appears on the Canadian version of the album, and has not been released in any other territories.

The music video for the song features Carter performing the song with the backdrop of a motorway system. The music video also featured Canadian pop star Shawn Desman, who co-wrote the song. The single peaked at #2 on the Canadian Singles Chart, based entirely on download sales. Carter ran a competition for amateur mixers to remix the track, with the winning remixer earning $1500 and their remix appearing on Carter's remix album, I'm Taking Off: Relaunched and Remixed.

== Track listing ==
1. "Love Can't Wait" - 3:32
2. "Love Can't Wait" (Stereotheif Remix)
3. "Love Can't Wait" (Maxwell B Superstar Remix)
4. "Love Can't Wait" (Music Video)

== Charts ==
Chart (2011)	Peak position
Canadian Singles Chart	2
