= Jennifer Paige =

American singer

- Born: Marietta, Georgia, U.S.
- Genres: Pop; pop rock
- Occupations: Singer
- Years active: 1995–present
- Labels: Hollywood; Edel; Glor/SPV
- Website: jenniferpaige.com

Jennifer Paige is an American singer. She is best known for her international number-one pop hit "Crush" and other singles "Sober", "Always You" and "Ta Voix (The Calling)" in duet with French singer Lââm.

== Career ==
=== Jennifer Paige ===
Jennifer's career as a Billboard 100 pop singer began with her first single, "Crush". The song, written by Andy Goldmark, Mark Mueller and Cosgrove & Clark was initially played by KIIS-FM in Los Angeles in April 1998 and went on to be the most-requested song on the radio station that summer. It became a number 3 Billboard chart hit in the U.S., logged 17 weeks in Billboard magazine's Top 10. "Crush" topped the charts in Australia, Canada, and New Zealand, and peaked within the top ten of the charts in several other countries, including Austria, France, the Netherlands, and the United Kingdom.

Her debut album, Jennifer Paige, was released in August 1998, and consisted of guitar-driven mid-tempo songs. Critics took notice of her voice. "Crush" was followed by two other singles, "Sober" and "Always You", the latter reaching #6 on the Billboard Dance Chart.

In the summer of 2000, Paige recorded a new song for the soundtrack of the film Autumn in New York, called "Beautiful".

=== Positively Somewhere and Flowers: The Jennifer Paige Hits Collection ===
Paige toured the world, sang at the Vatican (though Pope John Paul II was not present), and performed at the World Music Awards. Her second album, Positively Somewhere, was anchored by the single "These Days", and was released in September 2001 in United States. The European release launched a modest hit, "Stranded". Positively Somewhere cracked the Top 10 in Japan and both singles became radio hits across Asia.

In October 2003, Paige confirmed she was no longer with either Hollywood Records or Edel Records. Edel released Flowers: The Jennifer Paige Hits Collection as a result of her parting ways with the label. Paige continued writing for other artists, and compiling songs for a new studio effort.

=== Later works ===
In April 2006, "The Calling", was chosen by Lifetime Television for their made-for-TV movie, Augusta, Gone, based on the book of the same name. The song was written by Paige and co-writer/producer Chris Landon of Loudnoize Entertainment.

In 2008, the song named "Ta Voix (The Calling)" in duet with french singer Lââm top the french charts.

In 2015, she released "Is It Ever Enough" on her YouTube channel. In the same time, she launched a fundraising campaign to produce her upcoming album Starflower through Kickstarter. In December 2016, her song "Let Me Love You", was included in the compilation Nashville Indie Spotlight 2017. The album was released on March 31, 2017, while the lead single "The Devil's in the Details" was released on February 17, 2017.

== Influences ==
Paige has said that she has been influenced by singers such as Annie Lennox, Mariah Carey, Sade, George Michael and Etta James.

== Awards and nominations ==
Year	Awards	Work	Category	Result	Ref.
1999	RSH Gold Awards	Herself	Best Newcomer	Won	

== Discography ==
=== Studio albums ===
List of studio albums, with selected chart positions
Title	Year	Peak chart positions					
Title	Year	US	AUS	GER	NLD	SWI	UK
Jennifer Paige	1998	139	44	41	73	40	67
Positively Somewhere	2001	—	—	91	—	—	—
Best Kept Secret	2008	—	—	—	—	—	—
Holiday	2012	—	—	—	—	—	—
Starflower	2017	—	—	—	—	—	—

=== Compilations ===
- Flowers (The Hits Collection) (2003)

=== Singles ===
Year	Single	Peak chart positions										Certifications (sales thresholds)	Album
Year	Single	US	US Adult	AUS	AUT	CAN	FRA	GER	NLD	NZ	UK	Certifications (sales thresholds)	Album
1998	"Crush"	3	19	1	10	1	4	15	6	1	4	RIAA: Gold; ARIA: 2× Platinum; BPI: Platinum; RMNZ: Platinum; SNEP: Silver	Jennifer Paige
1999	"Sober"	—	—	58	—	—	—	78	—	45	68		Jennifer Paige
1999	"Always You"	—	—	—	—	—	—	76	—	—	81		Jennifer Paige
2001	"These Days"	—	40	—	—	—	—	—	—	—	—		Positively Somewhere
2002	"Stranded"	—	—	—	—	—	—	—	83	—	79		Positively Somewhere
2008	"Wasted"	—	—	—	—	—	—	—	—	—	—		Best Kept Secret
2008	"Underestimated"	—	—	—	—	—	—	—	26	—	—		Best Kept Secret
2008	"Ta Voix (The Calling)" (with Lââm)	—	—	—	—	—	37	—	—	—	—		Best Kept Secret
2009	"Beautiful Lie" (with Nick Carter)	—	—	—	49	—	—	19	—	—	—		Best Kept Secret
2017	"The Devil's in the Details"	—	—	—	—	—	—	—	—	—	—		Starflower
2017	"Let Me Love You"	—	—	—	—	—	—	—	—	—	—		Starflower
2017	"Forget Me Not"	—	—	—	—	—	—	—	—	—	—		Starflower
"—" denotes releases that did not chart

== Compilations ==
Year	Title	Album
2001	"Come, O Come Emmanuel"	A Musical Christmas from the Vatican
2006	"Hands and Hearts"	Groundbreakers – Songwriter Series 2

== As featured performer ==
Year	Title	Artist	Album
1996	"Now I Know"	Stephen Bishop	Now I Know
1997	"State of Independence"	Joe's Band	Listen
1997	"My Life Is Mine"	Joe's Band	Listen
1997	"Betterman"	Joe's Band	Listen
1997	"Let Me Stand Next To Your Fire	Joe's Band	Listen
1997	"High with You	Joe's Band	Listen
1997	"Sleep Peacefully Tonight"	Joe's Band	Listen
1999	"Wide Open Door"	Peter Wolf	Progression
1999	"Different Is Beautiful"	Peter Wolf	Progression

== Soundtracks ==
Year	Title	Album
2000	"Beautiful"	Autumn in New York
2001	"Power of Destiny" (English version)	TOKYOPOP Presents: Anime Trax, Vol. 1
2002	"Kick It into Gear"	The Country Bears
2007	"Gimme Gimme"	Grace Is Gone
2008	"In the Sunshine"	Smart People

== Writing credits ==
Year	Title	Artist	Album
2001	"Never Say Never"	Tomomi Kahara	Never Say Never (EP)
2004	"Free"	LaShell Griffin	Free
2009	"Forever Yours"	Yulianna	Yulianna
2012	"Magic"	Smash Mouth	Magic
2014	"Wicked Game"	Lauren Winans	"Wicked Game" (single)
2023	"Need You"	Naomi	"Need You"（Single）

== Filmography ==
- 1999: Tumbleweeds
- 2002: The Country Bears
