= Crush (Jennifer Paige song) =

1998 single by Jennifer Paige

Single by Jennifer Paige

from the album Jennifer Paige
- Released: June 9, 1998
- Genre: Teen pop
- Length: 3:20
- Label: Edel America; Hollywood
- Songwriters: Andy Goldmark; Mark Mueller; Berny Cosgrove; Kevin Clark
- Producers: Andy Goldmark; Jimmy Bralower

Jennifer Paige singles chronology
"Crush" (1998)	"Sober" (1999)

Music video
- "Crush" on YouTube

"Crush" is a song by American singer Jennifer Paige. The teen pop song was written by Andy Goldmark, Mark Mueller, Berny Cosgrove and Kevin Clark. It was released as the first single from her debut album, Jennifer Paige (1998). The music video for "Crush" was produced by Kati Haberstok and directed by David Hogan. "Crush" topped the charts in Australia, Canada, and New Zealand while peaking at number three on the US Billboard Hot 100, where it stayed for four consecutive weeks in September 1998. In the United Kingdom, "Crush" reached number four on the UK Singles Chart, and it also reached number four in France. It became a top-10 hit in at least 11 other countries, including Belgium, Germany, Ireland, Italy, the Netherlands, Norway, and Spain.

== Background and composition ==
In April 1998, soon after Paige recorded "Crush", producer Andy Goldmark played the song at top pop Los Angeles radio station KIIS-FM, where it met with a hugely positive reaction from programmers and was added to the station's playlist within days. During the first week of May, KIIS-FM became the first radio station to begin playing "Crush" and it began its meteoric rise up the charts, without typical record company promotion or release. Paige said "we had no pictures, photography, hadn't gotten it mastered or mass-produced it, nothing." Edel Records, Paige's initial label, made an initial press run of 20,000 copies of "Crush" which sold out quickly, and it soon became KIIS-FM's most requested song.

The song, written by Paige's producer Andy Goldmark along with the songwriters Mark Mueller, Berny Cosgrove and Kevin Clark, was inspired by Paige's personal experiences and observations in her love life. "Crush" is written in the key of C♯ minor and follows a tempo of 115 beats per minute. Paige's vocal range extends from G♯3 to C♯5.

== Critical reception ==
Billboard magazine wrote that Paige "succeeds in the nearly impossible task of oozing smoldering sensuality without resorting to typical groans and moans. Instead, she uses her notably flexible vocal range to convey the emotion of the tune, quickly soaring to lilting high notes and then dropping to the lowest point of her register to accentuate within the space of several seconds." They stated further that "as a result, she breathes a refreshing intensity into the song that renders it far more sexy than it would have been had she simply taken the easy route. Fortunately, this talented new artist is given a substantial song to work with," adding that producers Andy Goldmark and Jimmy Bralower "surround Paige with tense shuffle beats and twinkly synths". Blender put "Crush" at 189th place on their list of 500 Greatest Songs Since You Were Born. They described the song as "an unusually supple and sophisticated teen-pop hit informed by the level-headed sass of great R&B... swept along by a breathy chorus, pulsing groove and Paige's exquisite multilayered vocals."

== Chart performance ==
"Crush" was an international hit that peaked at number three on the US Billboard Hot 100, earned a gold certification from the Recording Industry Association of America, and sold 700,000 copies by the end of 1998. It reached number one in three countries: Australia (two weeks), Canada (five weeks) and New Zealand (one week). In Australia, the song is certified 2× platinum for more than 140,000 copies shipped, while in New Zealand it is certified gold for sales of over 5,000. In Europe, "Crush" reached number four in France and the United Kingdom, going gold in both countries, and number six in Ireland, the Netherlands and Norway. It also became a top-ten hit in Austria, Walloon Belgium, Denmark, Hungary and Spain, and it reached the top 20 in Flanders, Germany, Iceland, Sweden and Switzerland.

== Live performances ==
In August 1998, Paige made her debut TV appearance singing "Crush" on the ABC TV show Live with Regis and Kathie Lee. Paige also performed the show live on the Australian prime time TV show Hey Hey It's Saturday where she was presented an award for platinum sales of "Crush" in Australia. On September 11, 1998, Paige was featured and performed "Crush" on Top of the Pops, which was performed live.

== Track listings ==
CD single (US, UK, France, Europe)
No.	Title	Length
1.	"Crush"	3:19
2.	"Crush" (Dance Mix)	3:16
3.	"Crush" (Instrumental) (US and UK only)	3:19

CD maxi single (US, Australia, Europe)
No.	Title	Length
1.	"Crush"	3:19
2.	"Crush" (Dance Mix)	3:16
3.	"Crush" (Extended Club Mix) (US and Australia only)	5:18
4.	"Crush" (Instrumental)	3:19

"Crush" The Remixes CD (UK, Australia, Germany)
No.	Title	Title (Australia)	Length
1.	"Crush" (David Morales Radio Alt Intro)	"Crush" (David Morales Radio Mix)	3:40
2.	"Crush" (Tiefschwarz Radio Edit (Note: Tracks 2, 3, 5: Germany and Australia releases only))	"Crush" (Tiefschwarz Radio Mix)	3:49
3.	"Crush" (David Morales Club Mix)		7:10
4.	"Crush" (Tiefschwarz Hollywood Extended)		8:03
5.	"Crush" (David Morales Alt Club Body)	"Crush" (David Morales Classic Club Mix)	7:10
6.	"Crush" (David Morales La Crush Dub)		7:10

== Personnel ==
- Jennifer Paige – lead and backing vocals
- Kevin Dukes – guitars
- Andy Goldmark – keyboards and drum programming
- Jimmy Bralower – additional drum programming
- Alex Acuna – percussion

== Charts ==
=== Weekly charts ===
Chart (1998)	Peak position
Australia (ARIA)	1
Austria (Ö3 Austria Top 40)	10
Belgium (Ultratop 50 Flanders)	17
Belgium (Ultratop 50 Wallonia)	7
Canada (Nielsen SoundScan)	2
Canada Top Singles (RPM)	1
Canada Adult Contemporary (RPM)	1
Denmark (IFPI)	7
Europe (Eurochart Hot 100)	5
Finland (Suomen virallinen lista)	20
France (SNEP)	4
Germany (GfK)	15
Hungary (Mahasz)	5
Iceland (Íslenski Listinn Topp 40)	12
Ireland (IRMA)	6
Italy (Musica e dischi)	4
Italy Airplay (Music & Media)	1
Netherlands (Dutch Top 40)	6
Netherlands (Single Top 100)	6
New Zealand (Recorded Music NZ)	1
Norway (VG-lista)	6
Poland Airplay (Music & Media)	3
Scottish Singles Sales (Official Charts)	5
Spain (AFYVE)	7
Sweden (Sverigetopplistan)	14
Switzerland (Schweizer Hitparade)	12
UK Singles (Official Charts)	4
UK Independent (Official Charts)	1
US Billboard Hot 100	3
US Adult Contemporary (Billboard)	23
US Adult Pop Airplay (Billboard)	19
US Pop Airplay (Billboard)	3
US Rhythmic Airplay (Billboard)	26

Chart (2018)	Peak position
Poland Airplay (ZPAV)	79

=== Year-end charts ===
Chart (1998)	Position
Australia (ARIA)	7
Belgium (Ultratop 50 Wallonia)	52
Canada Top Singles (RPM)	2
Canada Adult Contemporary (RPM)	9
Europe (Eurochart Hot 100)	37
France (SNEP)	63
Germany (Media Control)	84
Netherlands (Dutch Top 40)	43
Netherlands (Single Top 100)	71
New Zealand (RIANZ)	32
Sweden (Hitlistan)	90
UK Singles (OCC)	53
US Billboard Hot 100	21
US Adult Top 40 (Billboard)	47
US Mainstream Top 40 (Billboard)	15
US Rhythmic Top 40 (Billboard)	90

Chart (1999)	Position
US Adult Contemporary (Billboard)	49
US Adult Top 40 (Billboard)	80

== Certifications and sales ==
Region	Certification	Certified units/sales
Australia (ARIA)	2× Platinum	140,000^{^}
France (SNEP)	Gold	250,000^{*}
New Zealand (RMNZ)	Platinum	30,000^{‡}
United Kingdom (BPI)	Platinum	600,000^{‡}
United States (RIAA)	Gold	700,000
^{*} Sales figures based on certification alone.^{^} Shipments figures based on certification alone.^{‡} Sales+streaming figures based on certification alone.

== Release history ==
Region	Date	Format(s)	Label(s)	Ref.
United States	June 9, 1998	Contemporary hit radio	Edel America; Hollywood	
United States	June 16, 1998	CD	Edel America; Hollywood	
United Kingdom	August 31, 1998	CD; cassette	Edel	
Japan	November 1, 1998	CD	Polydor	

== Cover versions ==
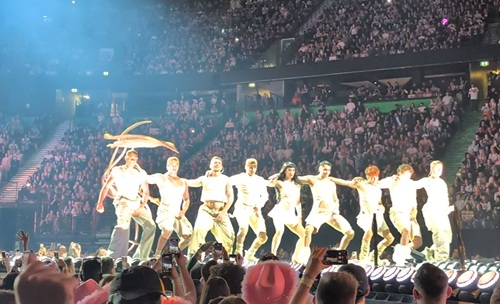
Katy Perry performing a snippet of "Crush" during her The Lifetimes Tour at Manchester Arena

In 2016, a cover of "Crush" by jazz keyboardist John Novello featuring R&B saxophonist Gerald Albright on the chorus reached number eight on the US Billboard Smooth Jazz Airplay chart. It entered at number 45 on the Smooth Jazz chart the week of January 26, 2016. As of the March 26, 2016, chart, it had spent a total of seven weeks in the top 30. A cover of "Crush" appears on Jai Paul's album Leak 04-13 (Bait Ones), released in 2019. In 2025, singer-songwriter Katy Perry performed a medley of the song with her own song of the same title, "CRUSH", as part of her Lifetimes Tour.
