= Kasia Livingston =

American songwriter

- Genres: Pop
- Occupation: Songwriter
- Years active: 2000–present

Kasia Livingston is an American songwriter who has written for Britney Spears, Whitney Houston, Jessica Simpson, the Pussycat Dolls and other artists, and has been nominated for Grammy and Soul Train Awards.

== Biography ==
Livingston began writing songs at the age of 10. She was discovered by the record producer David Foster, and went on to work with artists including Britney Spears, Whitney Houston, the Pussycat Dolls, New Kids on the Block, Flo Rida, The Wanted, Jessie J, Big Time Rush, Jordin Sparks, Jessica Simpson and Toni Braxton, as a songwriter and background vocalist.

Livingston joined the Los Angeles College of Music faculty in 2010 as a songwriting instructor.

== Discography ==
Livingston is a credited contributor on the following songs and albums:

- Pixie Lott, "Cry Baby" from Pixie Lott (2014)
- Mandy Capristo, "Pulse" from Grace (2012)
- Cheryl, "Love Killer" from A Million Lights (2012)
- Britney Spears, "Scary" from Femme Fatale (2011)
- Charice, "Bounce Back" from Infinity (2011)
- Jessie J, "Rainbow" from Who You Are (2011)
- Howie D, "Over My Head" from Back to Me
- Big Time Rush, "Count on You" from BTR (2010)
- The Wanted, "Replace Your Heart" from The Wanted (2010)
- Flo Rida, "Club Can't Handle Me" from Only One Flo (Part 1) (2010)
- Toni Braxton, "Hero" from Pulse (2010)
- Vedera, "Goodbye My Love" from Stages (2009)
- Tynisha Keli, "Walls Up" from The Chronicles of TK (2009)
- Whitney Houston, "Nothin' But Love" from I Look to You (2009)
- Michael Bolton, "Hope It's Too Late" from One World One Love (2009)
- Clay Aiken, "Weight of the World" from On My Way Here (2008)
- New Kids on the Block, "2 in the Morning" and "Don't Cry" from The Block (2008)
- Britney Spears, "Unusual You" and "Amnesia" from Circus (2008)
- The Pussycat Dolls, "Love the Way You Love Me" from Doll Domination (2008)
- Girlicious feat. Sean Kingston, "Still In Love" from Girlicious (album) (2008)
- Keke Wyatt, "Ghetto Rose" (2007)
- Valeria feat. Aria, "Girl I Told Ya" (2007)
- Jordin Sparks, "Save Me" from Jordin Sparks (2007)
- Nina, "Where Is Love" from Nina (2006)
- The Pussycat Dolls, "Stickwitu" from PCD (2005)
- Emma Roberts, "Dummy" from Unfabulous and More (2005)
- Lucy Woodward, "Always Something" from While You Can (2003)
- Jessica Simpson, "Everyday See You" and "Be" from In This Skin (2003)
- Gloria Gaynor, "I Never Knew" from I Wish You Love (2002)
- Jennifer Paige, "The Edge" from Positively Somewhere (2001)
- Eden's Crush, "Love This Way" from Popstars (2001)
- Dream, "How Long" from It Was All a Dream (2001)
- Brooke Allison, "Rollercoaster" and "Thought You Might Wanna Know" from Brooke Allison (2001)
- Plus One, "With All Your Heart" from Pokémon 2000: The Power Of One (Music From And Inspired By The Motion Picture)
