= Superstar Hits =

2002 compilation album

Superstar Hits is a compilation album released in 2002 and re-released in 2004 with new songs for tracks 12–16 by Walt Disney Records. It features songs from popular Disney movies by mainstream artists like Celine Dion, Regina Belle, Elton John, Phil Collins, Vanessa Williams, Tina Turner, and Christina Aguilera.

== Track listings ==
Superstar Hits

Compilation album by Various artists
- Released: March 5, 2002
- Genres: Pop, gospel, rock, world, funk
- Label: Walt Disney

=== 2002 version ===
No.	Title	Performed by	Length
1.	"Beauty and the Beast" (Beauty and the Beast)	Celine Dion and Peabo Bryson	4:05
2.	"You'll Be in My Heart" (Tarzan)	Phil Collins	4:19
3.	"Circle of Life" (The Lion King)	Elton John	4:52
4.	"Reflection" (Mulan)	Christina Aguilera	3:36
5.	"My Funny Friend and Me" (The Emperor's New Groove)	Sting	4:38
6.	"Colors of the Wind" (Pocahontas)	Vanessa Williams	4:18
7.	"True to Your Heart" (Mulan)	98 Degrees and Stevie Wonder	4:16
8.	"Strangers Like Me" (Tarzan)	Phil Collins	3:00
9.	"He Lives in You" (The Lion King II: Simba's Pride)	Tina Turner	4:44
10.	"When She Loved Me" (Toy Story 2)	Sarah McLachlan	3:05
11.	"You've Got a Friend in Me" (Toy Story)	Randy Newman and Lyle Lovett	2:41
12.	"Once Upon a Time in New York City" (Oliver & Company)	Huey Lewis	3:58
13.	"A Whole New World" (Aladdin)	Regina Belle and Peabo Bryson	4:05
14.	"I'm Gonna Love You (Madellaine's Love Song)" (The Hunchback of Notre Dame II)	Jennifer Love Hewitt	3:32
15.	"Put It Together (Bibbidi Bobbidi Boo)" (Cinderella II: Dreams Come True)	Brooke Allison	4:07
16.	"Hakuna Matata" (The Lion King)	Jimmy Cliff and Lebo M	4:24

Superstar Hits

Compilation album by Various artists
- Released: November 2, 2004
- Genres: Pop, gospel, rock, world, funk
- Label: Walt Disney

=== 2004 re-release ===
No.	Title	Performed by	Length
1.	"Beauty and the Beast" (Beauty and the Beast)	Celine Dion and Peabo Bryson	4:05
2.	"You'll Be in My Heart" (Tarzan)	Phil Collins	4:19
3.	"Circle of Life" (The Lion King)	Elton John	4:52
4.	"Reflection" (Mulan)	Christina Aguilera	3:36
5.	"My Funny Friend and Me" (The Emperor's New Groove)	Sting	4:38
6.	"Colors of the Wind" (Pocahontas)	Vanessa Williams	4:18
7.	"True to Your Heart" (Mulan)	98 Degrees and Stevie Wonder	4:16
8.	"Strangers Like Me" (Tarzan)	Phil Collins	3:00
9.	"He Lives in You" (The Lion King II: Simba's Pride)	Tina Turner	4:44
10.	"When She Loved Me" (Toy Story 2)	Sarah McLachlan	3:05
11.	"You've Got a Friend in Me" (Toy Story)	Randy Newman and Lyle Lovett	2:41
12.	"Look Through My Eyes" (Brother Bear)	Phil Collins	4:01
13.	"If I Didn't Have You" (Monsters, Inc.)	Billy Crystal and John Goodman	3:40
14.	"Burning Love" (Lilo & Stitch)	Wynonna	3:09
15.	"Will the Sun Ever Shine Again" (Home on the Range)	Bonnie Raitt	2:36
16.	"I'm Still Here" (Treasure Planet)	John Rzeznik	4:12
