= Into You =

Into You may refer to:

- "Into You" (Fabolous song), 2003
- "Into You" (Ariana Grande song), 2016
- "Into You", a song by 3Deep, 1999
- "Into You", a song by Carolyn Dawn Johnson from Love & Negotiation, 2006
- "Into You", a song by Cat Burns, 2021
- "Into You", a song by the Cinematic Orchestra from Ma Fleur, 2007
- "Into You", a song by Funkadelic from One Nation Under a Groove, 1978
- "Into You", a song by Giant Steps, 1988
- "Into You", a song by Julia Michaels from Inner Monologue Part 1, 2019
- "Into You", a song by Jun Hyo-seong, 2015
- "Into You", a song by KARD from You & Me, 2017
- "Into You", a song by Melanie C from Melanie C, 2020
- "Into You", a song by Pepper MaShay, 1998
- "Into You", a song by Tegi Pannu

== See also ==
- N II U (pronounced "Into You"), an American R&B group
- So into You (disambiguation)
