= Brooke Allison (album) =

2001 studio album by Brooke Allison

Studio album by Brooke Allison
- Released: June 19, 2001
- Genre: Teen pop
- Length: 42:02
- Label: Virgin; 2KSounds
- Producer: Michael Blakey; Robert Palmer; Elton Ahi; Peter Rafelson; Jeff Vincent; Damon Elliott; Mark Portmann

Singles from Brooke Allison
- 1. "The Kiss-Off (Goodbye)" Released: March 13, 2001; 2. "Thought You Might Wanna Know" Released: June 2001

Brooke Allison is the only studio album by American singer Brooke Allison. Virgin Records released the album on June 19, 2001. Allison worked with producers including Michael Blakey, Robert Palmer, Elton Ahi, Peter Rafelson, Jeff Vincent, Damon Elliott, and Mark Portmann. It is a teen pop album, which was conceived after Allison's songs were discovered by a recording executive online. Brooke Allison's lyrical themes revolve around love and relationships.

Brooke Allison includes two singles: "The Kiss-Off (Goodbye)" and "Thought You Might Wanna Know", with the former peaking at number 29 on the Billboard Hot 100 Singles Sales chart.

== Background ==
In 2001, Allison signed to Virgin Records after a recording executive discovered some of her songs on the internet.

The album was promoted through the children's television channel Nickelodeon. Allison appeared on a number of TV programs to promote it, including Nickelodeon's Slime Time Live. Allison guest starred on the Nickelodeon television series Taina in the season two episode, Sabotage. The album's closing track, "Say Goodbye", is featured in the episode.

== Critical reception ==
Professional ratings
Review scores
Source	Rating
AllMusic	2.5/5 stars
Robert Christgau	(choice cut)

The album received generally mixed reviews, with the Knight Ridder calling it "a classic exhibit of the pop music industry's assembly-line tendencies". Stephen Thomas Erlewine from AllMusic praised "The Kiss-Off (Goodbye)" and "Toodle-Oo" but wrote that "Allison tries so hard to sound different while remaining commercial enough to be successful, her record can be grating at times".

== Track listing ==
Brooke Allison track listing
No.	Title	Writer(s)	Producer(s)	Length
1.	"The Kiss-Off (Goodbye)"	Jim Peterik; Jeff Jacobs	Michael Blakey; Robert Palmer; Elton Ahi^{[a]}	3:33
2.	"Oh No" (interlude)	Blakey; Palmer	—	0:10
3.	"Toodle-oo"	Peter Rafelson; Jeff Vincent	Blakey; Rafelson; Vincent	3:39
4.	"I Miss You"	Larry Dvoskin; Meredith Brooks	Blakey; Ahi	4:10
5.	"Seth" (interlude)	Blakey; Palmer	—	0:24
6.	"Rollercoaster"	Palmer; Kasia Livingston; Vincent	Blakey; Palmer; Vincent^{[a]}	3:31
7.	"Thought You Might Wanna Know"	Palmer; Livingston	Blakey; Palmer	3:58
8.	"If I Were You"	James Day; Amy Powers; Jim Gately	Blakey; Ahi	4:15
9.	"Perfect Chemistry"	Mya Harrison; Damon Elliott; Blakey	Blakey; Elliott	3:04
10.	"Without You"	Vincent Brantley	Blakey; Ahi	3:26
11.	"Maybe Tonight"	Erik Trent Andrews	Blakey; Ahi	4:04
12.	"Dating" (interlude)	Blakey; Palmer	—	0:16
13.	"My Heart Goes Boom"	Greg Wood; Geoman	Blakey; Ahi	3:13
14.	"Say Goodbye"	Mark Portmann; Allan Rich; Serge Colbert	Blakey; Portmann^{[a]}	4:19
Total length:				42:02

Notes

- ^{^[a]} signifies an additional producer

== Personnel ==
Credits are adapted from the liner notes of Brooke Allison.

- Elton Ahi – production, mixing, strings, piano
- Agostina – make-up
- Brooke Allison – lead and background vocals
- Michael Argento – spoken vocals on interludes
- Michael Blakey – production, mixing, drum programming, percussion, strings, executive producer
- Chelsea Brummet – spoken vocals on interludes
- David Campbell – strings
- Scott Canady – bass guitar
- Frank Chevalier – stylist
- Cario Dalla Chiesa – photography
- Yong-Bae Cho – engineering
- Serge Colbert – strings
- Demetric Collins – guitars, percussion
- Claudio Cueni – mixing
- Jim Davis – assistant engineer
- Elwood Edwards – sample vocals
- Damon Elliott – production, programming
- Mary Fagot – creative direction
- Craig Furkas – engineer
- Grant Geissman – acoustic guitar
- Bruce Gladstone – executive producer
- Van Gogh – production
- Jesse Gorman – assistant engineer
- Julie Griffin – background vocals
- Portia Griffin – background vocals
- John Guidon – executive producer
- David Guerrero – assistant engineer
- Tim Heintz – keyboards
- Kent Huffnagle – assistant engineer
- Charles Jefferson – bass guitar
- Denaine Jones – background vocals
- Aaron Kaplan – assistant engineer
- Tim Malone – mix engineer
- Matt Marrin – assistant engineer
- Ethan Mates – mixing
- Will Miller – strings
- Fred Mirza – arrangement
- Tim Neuman – creative direction
- Robert Palmer – production, guitars, keyboards
- Dave Pensada – mix engineer
- Mark Portmann – production, strings
- Ian Prince – keyboards
- Serena Radaelli – hair
- Peter Rafelson – production, mixing, engineering
- Eric Roinestad – art direction, design
- Christophe Saluzzo – hair
- Eddy Schreyer – mastering
- Jill Tengan – assistant engineer
- Michael Thompson – guitars
- Jeff Vincent – production, keyboards
