= Joshua Morrow =

American actor (born 1974)

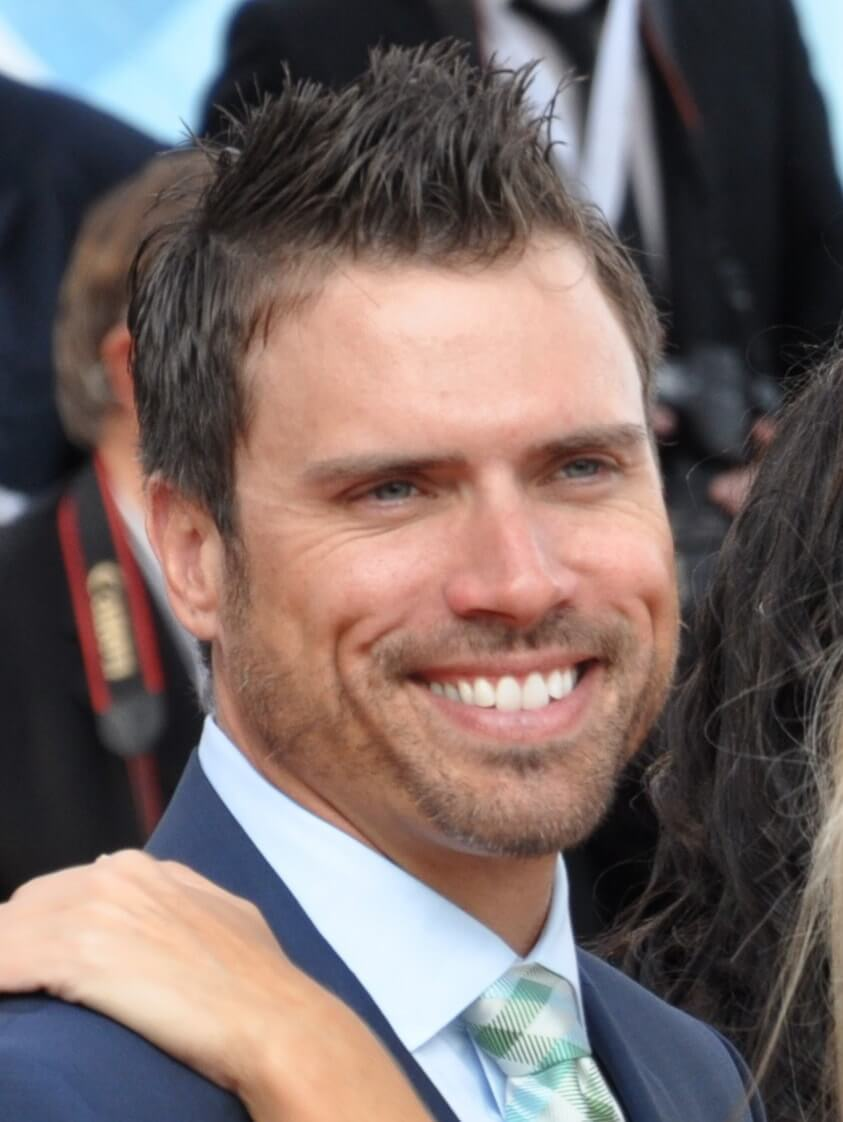
- Morrow at the 2013 Monte-Carlo Television Festival
- Born: Joshua Jacob Morrow; February 8, 1974 (age 52); Juneau, Alaska, U.S.
- Occupation: Actor
- Years active: 1994–present
- Known for: Portrayal of Nicholas Newman on The Young and the Restless
- Spouse: October "Tobe" Keeney (m. 2001)
- Children: 4

Joshua Jacob Morrow (born February 8, 1974) is an American television actor and musician. In 1994, he began his career when he was cast in the role of Nicholas Newman on The Young and the Restless. In 1998, he joined the soul-pop group 3Deep; the group disbanded in 2001.

== Career ==
Morrow has portrayed the character Nicholas Newman on The Young and the Restless since 1994. Early in his career, he formed the musical group 3Deep with Eddie Cibrian, his best friend and former co-star on Y&R, and CJ Huyer.

== Personal life ==
Morrow plays on the World Poker Tour in the Hollywood Home Games for The V Foundation for Cancer Research charity. On August 4, 2001, Morrow married October "Tobe" Keeney. Together, the pair have four children: three boys, Cooper Jacob, born September 27, 2002; Crew James, born May 27, 2005 and Cash Joshua, born April 21, 2008, and one girl, Charlie Jo, born on October 30, 2012.

== Filmography ==
Acting roles
Year	Title	Role	Notes
1994–present	The Young and the Restless	Nicholas Newman	Soap opera; main role
1997	My Stepson, My Lover - Love, Murder and Deceit	Eric Cory	TV Movie

== Awards and nominations ==
List of acting awards and nominations
Year	Award	Category	Title	Result	Refs.
1996	Daytime Emmy Award	Outstanding Younger Actor in a Drama Series	The Young and the Restless	Nominated	
1996	Soap Opera Digest Award	Outstanding Younger Leading Actor	The Young and the Restless	Won	
1997	Daytime Emmy Award	Outstanding Younger Actor in a Drama Series	The Young and the Restless	Nominated	
1998	Daytime Emmy Award	Outstanding Younger Actor in a Drama Series	The Young and the Restless	Nominated	
1999	Daytime Emmy Award	Outstanding Younger Actor in a Drama Series	The Young and the Restless	Nominated	
2000	Daytime Emmy Award	Outstanding Younger Actor in a Drama Series	The Young and the Restless	Nominated	
2001	Soap Opera Digest Award	Outstanding Hero	The Young and the Restless	Won	
2016	Soap Awards France	Best Actor of the Year	The Young and the Restless	Nominated	
2018	Soap Awards France	Best Couple of the Year — "Sharon and Nick" (shared with Sharon Case)	The Young and the Restless	Nominated	

Preceded by John Alden	Nicholas Newman (role); 1994–present	Incumbent
