= Disney's Princess Favorites =

Compilation album by Various Artists
- Released: February 5, 2002
- Recorded: 1958–2001
- Genre: Musical theater, pop
- Length: 34:37
- Label: Walt Disney
- Producer: Howard Ashman, Bruce Botnick, Mike Bradford, Harold J. Kleiner, Robert Kraft, Mark Mancina, Alan Menken, Bambi Moé, Matthew Wilder

Professional ratings
Review scores
Source	Rating
AllMusic	4/5 stars

Disney's Princess Favorites is a 2002 album released by Walt Disney Records that serves partially as a soundtrack to the direct-to-video animated film Cinderella II: Dreams Come True (which there was never a true soundtrack released for), but also as a standard compilation of classic Princess-related Disney songs. It was released on February 5, 2002, and went on to peak at #3 on Billboard's Top Kid Audio chart.

== Track listing ==
1. "I Won't Say (I'm in Love)" - Susan Egan, Lillias White, LaChanze, Roz Ryan, Cheryl Freeman, and Vaneese Thomas (Hercules)
2. "Belle" - Paige O'Hara, Richard White, and Chorus (Beauty and the Beast)
3. "Can You Feel the Love Tonight" - Kristle Edwards, Joseph Williams, Sally Dworsky, Nathan Lane, and Ernie Sabella (The Lion King)
4. "If I Can't Love Her" - Terrence Mann (Beauty and the Beast Broadway Musical)
5. "Reflection" - Lea Salonga (Mulan)
6. "Out of Thin Air" - Liz Callaway and Brad Kane (Aladdin and the King of Thieves)
7. "Kiss the Girl" - Samuel E. Wright (The Little Mermaid)
8. "Once Upon a Dream" - Mary Costa and Bill Shirley (Sleeping Beauty)
9. "Follow Your Heart" - Brooke Allison (Cinderella II: Dreams Come True)
10. "The World is Looking Up to You" - Brooke Allison (Cinderella II: Dreams Come True)
11. "It's What's Inside That Counts" - Brooke Allison (Cinderella II: Dreams Come True)
12. "Put It Together (Bibbidi-Bobbidi-Boo)" - Brooke Allison (Cinderella II: Dreams Come True)
