= YLA (group) =

American girl group

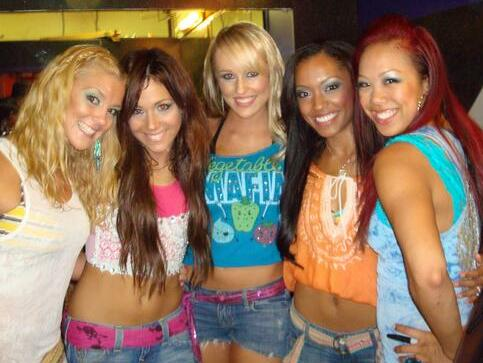
- The group as BG5 in 2009. Left to right: Laura New, Mandy Jiroux, Brooke Adams, Dominique Domingo, and Noreen Juliano.

Background information
- Also known as: The Beach Girlz (2008); BG5/The Beach Girl5 (2008–2012)
- Origin: Los Angeles, California, United States
- Genres: Pop; dance-pop; R&B
- Years active: 2008–2014
- Label: RMR
- Past members: Brooke Allison Adams; Dominique Domingo; Mandy Jiroux; Noreen Juliano; Laura New; Jaime Lee Ruiz

YLA (known as BG5 and The Beach Girl5 from 2008 to 2012) were an American girl group originally consisting of Brooke Allison Adams, Mandy Jiroux, Laura New, Dominique Domingo, and Noreen Juliano. In 2009, as BG5, the group released their debut EP Beach Girl5. The following year, they released the single "Scratch", which peaked at number 22 on the Billboard Dance Club Songs chart.

In 2012, following the departure of Jiroux and addition of new member Jaime Lee Ruiz, the group reformed under the name YLA. The following year, the group released "$$$EX", a collaboration with Vanessa Hudgens. It became their most successful release, peaking at number 11 on the Billboard Dance Club Songs chart and spending twelve weeks on the chart. The same year, BG5's self titled debut album, which was recorded prior to the group being renamed YLA, was released to digital retailers. The group released one final single, "Bad Bitches", before disbanding in March 2014.

== History ==
=== 2008–2012: BG5 ===
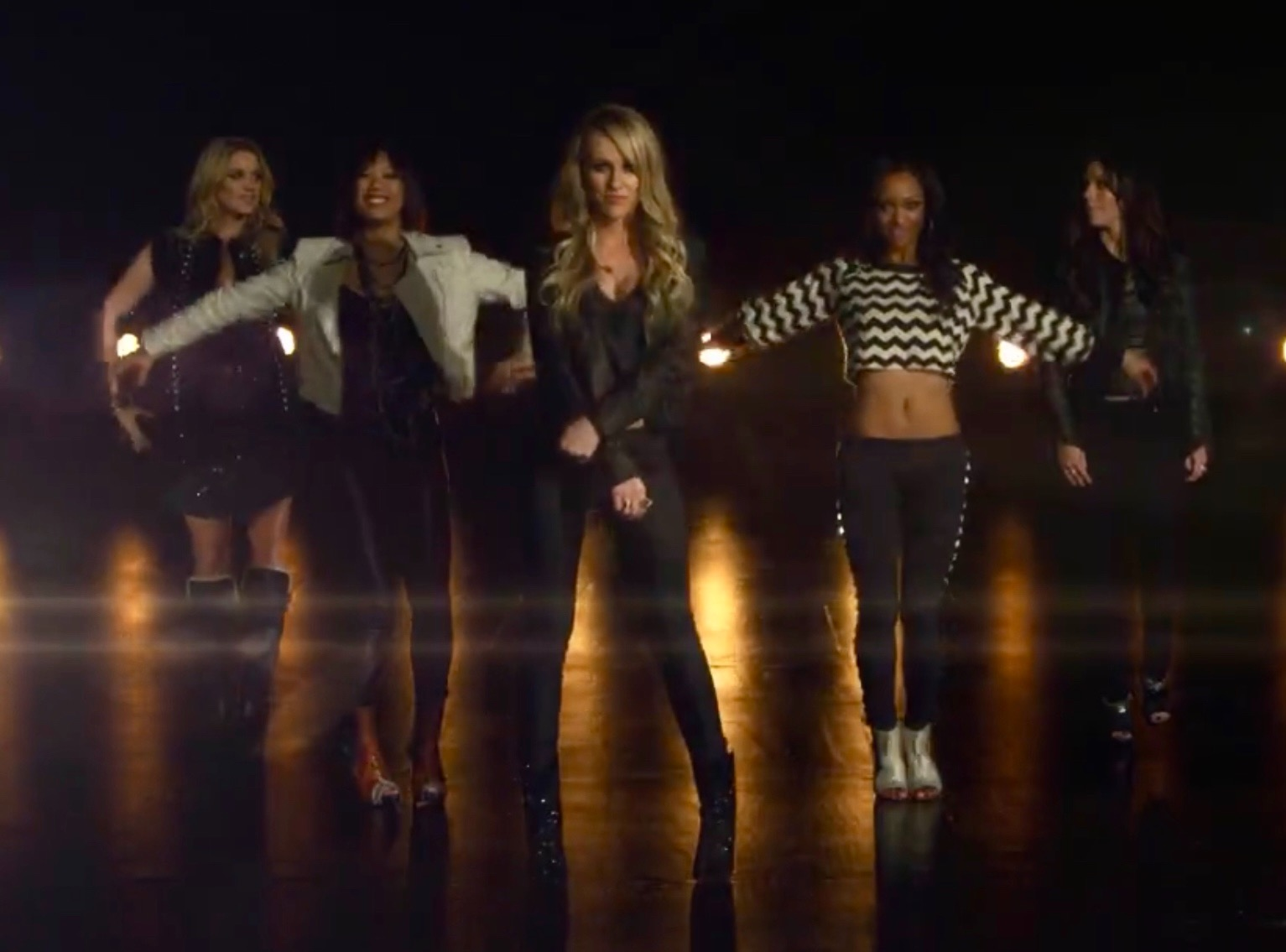
BG5 in 2011

In 2008, Brooke Allison Adams, Mandy Jiroux, Laura New, Dominique Domingo, and Noreen Juliano formed the group The Beach Girlz. The group members met after being individually hired as entertainers on the 2008 AVP Pro Beach Volleyball Tour. The group's name was later simplified to BG5, which stands for The Beach Girl5.

In 2009, BG5 won KIIS-FM's "Breakout Star" contest, which awarded them $10,000 and a spot in the 2009 Wango Tango line-up. They worked with producers Rock Mafia and released the single "Unbreakable" which was followed by the release of their debut EP Beach Girl5 on December 11, 2009. In 2010, they were an opening act for Selena Gomez and Justin Bieber. They began being managed by Kris Jenner and appeared in two episodes of the show Keeping Up with the Kardashians in autumn of that year. In September, they were credited as backing vocalists on the track "Summer's Not Hot" by Selena Gomez & the Scene from their album A Year Without Rain. In November, they released the single "Scratch". "Scratch" peaked at number 22 on the Billboard Dance Club Songs chart. In early 2011, the group was showcased in a television commercial for the 2011 Pacific-10 Conference men's basketball tournament. The commercial, which aired on Fox Sports, featured the group performing their previous single "Unbreakable". The same year, the group released the single "Lay A Little Sunshine" and appeared in an episode of Khloé & Lamar.

=== 2013–2014: YLA ===
In late 2012, Jiroux departed from BG5. Following her departure, the group was renamed YLA (which stands for Young L.A.) with new member Jaime Lee Ruiz.

In February 2013, YLA released the single "Kids R OK". The group performed the song in an appearance on Kathy during the same month. In March 2013, YLA released the single "$$$EX", a collaboration with Vanessa Hudgens. The song peaked at number 11 on the Billboard Dance Club Songs chart and spent twelve weeks on the chart. Though not included on the soundtrack, the song was released to promote the film Spring Breakers, which starred Hudgens. Later that month, the group was featured on the third soundtrack for the Disney Channel show Shake It Up with the song "I Can Do Better". In August 2013, the group performed "I Can Do Better" on the third season episode of Shake It Up, "Oui Oui It Up". In September 2013, BG5's self titled full debut album, which was recorded prior to their name change, was released to digital retailers. In November 2013, YLA released the single "Bad Bitches". The song was supposed to serve as the lead single from an album due out in 2014, but the album was shelved and the song was the group's final release. On March 7, 2014, the group announced their dissolution on Instagram.

== Discography ==
=== Studio albums ===
Title	Album details
BG5	Released: September 16, 2013; Label: Shamerock Solutions UK Ltd; Formats: Digital download

=== EPs ===
Title	Album details
Beach Girl5	Released: December 11, 2009; Label: Rock Mafia Records; Formats: Digital download

=== Singles ===
Title	Year	Peak chart positions	Album
Title	Year	US Dance	Album
"Unbreakable"	2009	—	Beach Girl5
"Scratch"	2010	22	BG5
"Lay A Little Sunshine"	2011	—	BG5
"Kids R OK"	2013	—	Non-album singles
"$$$EX" (with Vanessa Hudgens)	2013	11	Non-album singles
"Bad Bitches"	2013	—	Non-album singles
"—" denotes releases that did not chart.
