= So into You =

So into You may refer to:

- "So into You" (Koda Kumi song), 2002
- "So Into You" (Tamia song), 1998
- "So into You" (The Wildhearts song), 2003
- "So in to You", a 1977 song by Atlanta Rhythm Section from their album A Rock and Roll Alternative

== See also ==
- "I'm So into You", a song by SWV
- "I'm So into You", a song by Aaliyah from Age Ain't Nothing but a Number
- "Sow into You", a song by Róisín Murphy from her 2005 album Ruby Blue
- Into You (disambiguation)
