= Howie Dorough =

American singer, member of the Backstreet Boys (born 1973)

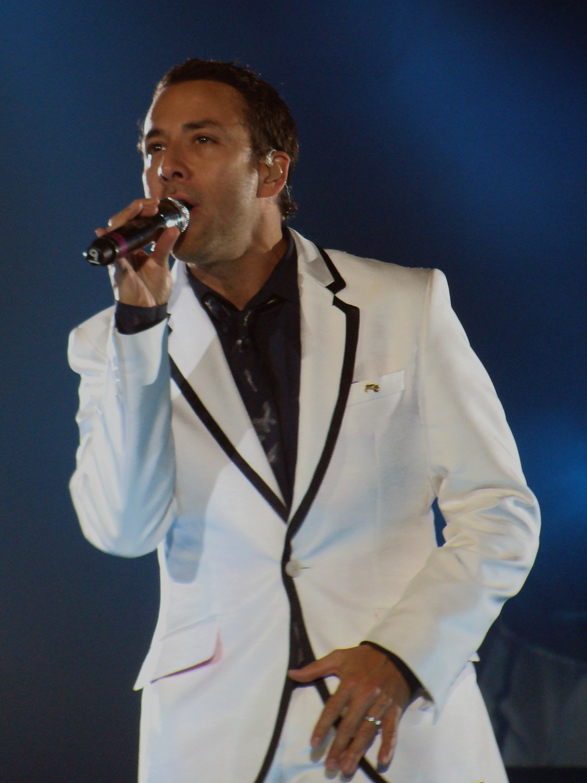
- Dorough at a NKOTBSB show in Newcastle Arena, 2012
- Born: Howard Dwaine Dorough; August 22, 1973 (age 53); Orlando, Florida, U.S.
- Other names: "Howie D"; "Tony Donetti"
- Education: Valencia College
- Occupations: Singer; actor
- Years active: 1989–present
- Spouse: Leigh Boniello (m. 2007)
- Children: 2
- Musical career
- Genres: pop; R&B, pop rock, dance
- Instrument: Vocals
- Labels: Jive; RCA; K-BAHN
- Member of: Backstreet Boys
- Formerly of: NKOTBSB
- Website: howied.net

Signature
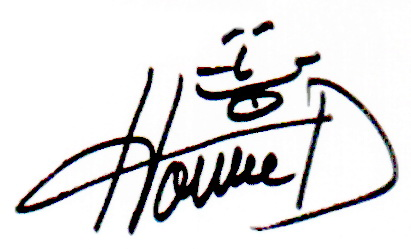

Howard Dwaine Dorough (born August 22, 1973), also known as Howie D, is an American singer and actor. He is a member of the pop vocal group Backstreet Boys.

== Early life ==
Dorough was born August 22, 1973 in Orlando, Florida, where he met his friend and bandmate AJ McLean through a mutual vocal coach at the Latin carnival in 1989. His mother, school worker Paula Flores-Dorough, is Puerto Rican. His father, Hoke Dwaine Dorough, was a police officer, former army soldier, real estate developer, and bank security guard of Irish American descent. Dorough is the youngest of five siblings by 10 years. His sister, Pollyanna, is also a singer.

== Career ==
=== Early career ===
Dorough's love of entertainment began at age three when he sang and played "Babyface" on his little guitar. Thanks to his sister Pollyanna, he started performing at age six or seven. Dorough sang in the church choir during Mass and sang and acted in the musical adaptation of The Wizard of Oz.

Throughout elementary school, Dorough performed in community theater productions of top musicals such as "Sound Of Music," "Showboat" and "Camelot". He attended a performing arts academy where he took singing lessons; acting lessons; and dance lessons in classical ballet, tap, and jazz. During junior high and high school, Dorough sang in the choir, qualified for the All-State Chorus and talent shows, and joined the drama club. He acted in school productions and on a school TV show called "Macho & Camacho."

Dorough was discovered by an acting agent when he was 14. The agent gave him the stage name Tony Donetti. He managed to land roles in movies such as Parenthood and Cop and a Half. He also played a lead role in the Nickelodeon TV production pilot for "Welcome Freshman" and starred in a commercial for Disney World. Dorough even auditioned for the Mickey Mouse Club. Dorough was a victim of bullying as a child due to his lack of Spanish fluency, his falsetto vocal range when he was 12, and his weight.

Dorough's choir teacher asked him to perform the national anthem at his high school basketball game. He agreed to do so, but forgot the words when it was time for him to sing. Despite the extreme embarrassment, he got right back on his horse and began performing again when he sang 'Unchained Melody' at his school talent show, receiving a standing ovation. He also auditioned for the Latin boy band Menudo, but he did not make it. He was involved in a peer counseling group called Friends in which he talked to other kids about living "a clean life, having fun, going to school, avoiding drugs." He worked as a tour guide in Universal Orlando and worked with his sister at Zarro's Bread Basket one summer in New York when he was 14.

Dorough was named 'Most Talented' and graduated from Edgewater High School in 1991 as one of the top 10 members of his class.

After high school, Dorough auditioned for Backstreet Boys under his stage name, but they lost his headshot and contact information. After six months, they were able to locate him. He attended both University of Central Florida and Valencia College. Dorough obtained an Associate of Arts Degree.

=== Backstreet Boys ===
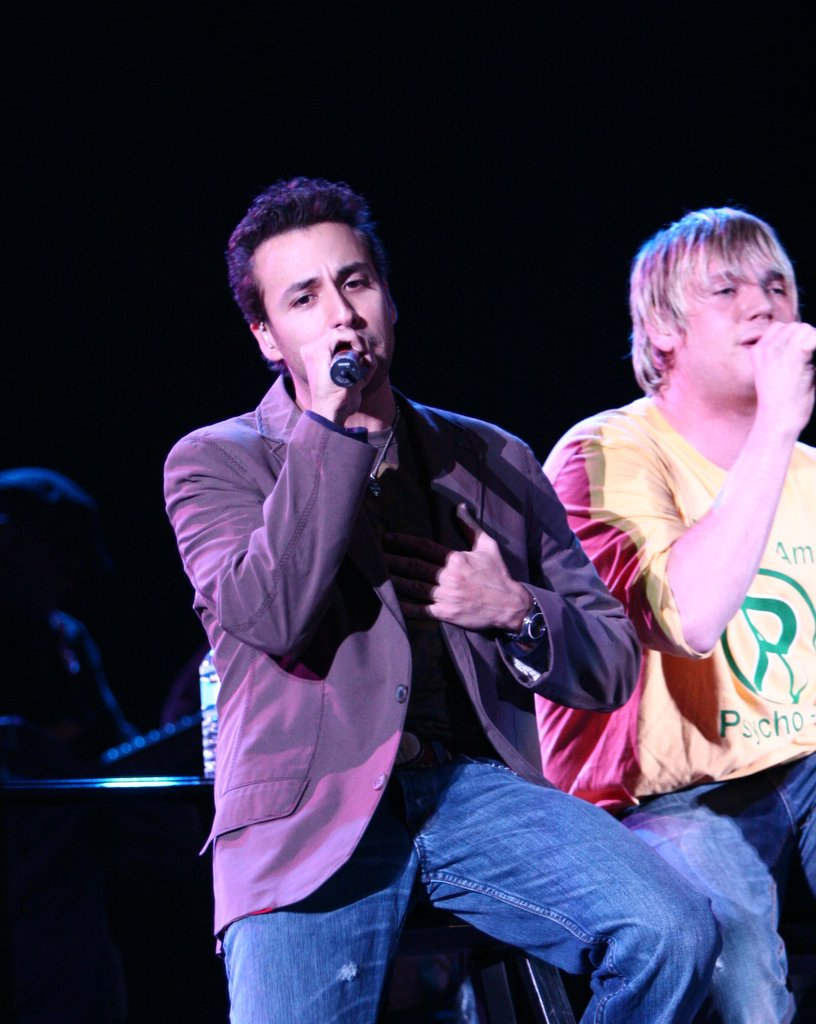
Dorough (left) and Nick Carter with the Backstreet Boys, 2005

Lou Pearlman created the Backstreet Boys in 1993, selecting Howie Dorough along with AJ McLean, Brian Littrell, Nick Carter, and Kevin Richardson. They were then booked to perform at many venues, such as high schools and shopping malls, and eventually signed a contract with Jive Records in 1994. They slowly became popular in European countries, starting in Germany, and embarked on a tour to support their debut album. The album slowly climbed to the top ten slots in most countries and was on its way to selling more than 8 million copies.

While their second album, Backstreet's Back, was being released in Europe, they released their first album in the United States, a compilation of their international debut and Backstreet's Back. The album climbed to No. 4 on the Billboard 200 and sold over 14 million copies. Meanwhile, Backstreet's Back became an even greater success than their debut album, opening at number one in many countries.

An in-studio fart from Dorough was recorded and used as a part of the beat for the song "The Call" from the Backstreet Boys' fourth album, Black And Blue.

They started recording Millennium in 1998 and released it in May 1999. It became one of the biggest-selling albums ever, reaching number one in many countries. Their first single from Millennium's follow-up album, Black & Blue, Shape Of My Heart was released to radio on October 3. Black and Blue recorded first-week sales of 1.59 million copies in the US, making the Backstreet Boys the first artists to achieve back-to-back million album sales.

After releasing their greatest-hits album, they went on hiatus and regrouped in 2003. They released their next album, Never Gone in 2005. Although critics were negative, it enjoyed considerable commercial success. They released their next album, Unbreakable in 2007 and the follow-up This Is Us in 2009. Their eighth album In a World Like This was released on July 30, 2013. Their ninth album DNA was released on January 25, 2019, and was followed by a new headlining tour in May of the same year. They have become one of the biggest-selling artists of all time, with record sales exceeding 135 million worldwide.

=== Solo projects ===
Dorough worked as a producer for singer-songwriters George Nozuka and Katelyn Tarver as part of his management partnership with former 3deep member CJ Huyer, which led to the formation of HC Entertainment in 2004. Since 2010, he's also managed the Canadian band Neverest under Dorough's company, 3 Street Management.

In 2006, he started work on his first solo album. The album would include Spanish/Latin songs as well as American ones. But he eventually changed his mind about the album's style, noting that his Spanish was not the best and that he did not want to be something he was not. Around 2010, he started working on an album in a more pop/R&B style. Dorough's first solo album, Back to Me, was eventually released on November 15, 2011. The album featured many songs that Dorough co-wrote himself. The album's first single, "100", was released in the summer of 2011 and received moderate airplay primarily in Canada. Also in November 2011, Dorough joined Britney Spears for her Femme Fatale Tour in South America.

In 2015, although Howie had not announced he was working on a second solo album, some producers mentioned working with him on a new album slated for release that year. On May 9, 2019, he announced on Twitter and Instagram that his new solo album, "Which One Am I," would be released on July 12, 2019. The album was written by Tor Hyams and Lisa St. Lou and was produced by Hyams.

=== TV and film appearances ===
While in the Backstreet Boys, Dorough has done some acting over the years. Appearing in Roswell, ABC's television series Sabrina, the Teenage Witch in the episode "The Big Head" as an egotistic rock star named Strum, and voiced Santa Claus on the Nick Jr animated series Dora the Explorer in the Christmas episode "A Present for Santa" and did a skit on Saturday Night Live on May 15, 1999. In September 2002, Dorough and the rest of The Backstreet Boys made special guest appearances on the children's cartoon Arthur. In 2013, Dorough made his motion picture debut by appearing in the comedy This Is the End along with the rest of the Backstreet Boys. On February 5, 2021, Dorough appeared on Long Island Medium: There in Spirit to receive a psychic reading from Theresa Caputo about his father and sister. On February 1, 2022, Dorough competed in a dance competition for Dirty Dancing on Fox. In June 2017, Dorough appeared on the USA Network show Big Star Little Star with his then 7-year-old son James. On February 7, 2024, Dorough appeared on the Fox Network show Name that Tune, competing against Drew Lachey of the band 98 Degrees. Dorough appeared on Hell's Kitchen's twenty-fifth season as a Chef's table guest for the red team's kitchen in the fourth dinner service.

=== Other ventures ===
Dorough also founded a company called Sweet D, Inc. with his older brother John. The company specializes in real estate development and consulting. It has built numerous condominiums, hotels, and waterfront properties. He's also founded and held the positions of CEO, chairman, and director in several other companies, most notably Dorough Lupus Foundation and Howiedoit Productions, Inc.

Early in 2020, Dorough starred in a musical loosely based on his life called Howie D: Back in the Day at The Rose Theater in Omaha, Nebraska. In the show, Dorough's sister, Pollyanna, was played by Natalie Hanson and his Mother was played by Christina Maria. The musical was written by Tor Hyams & Lisa St. Lou.

== Personal life ==
In September 1998, Dorough's sister, Caroline Dorough-Cochran, died of lupus. After her death, Dorough established the Dorough Lupus Foundation (DLF) in her honor to help raise money for lupus research. Howie has organized many charity events for the foundation, including concerts, auctions, and annual cruises. The foundation helps raise awareness of the disease, provides financial support to those who cannot afford treatment, and raises funds for research. According to Dorough and his older brother John, the foundation has since closed due to lack of funds and the economy.

According to the band's YouTube page, and 2019 ancestry results, he has Scandinavian, African, Iberian, Native American, Central and South American, Scottish, Welsh, Balkan, and Middle Eastern ancestry.

=== Relationships ===
Dorough has been private about his romantic connections. According to "Entertainment Tonight", he dated his singing partner Jennifer during his final year of high school, but they broke up due to his career in 1994, leaving him heartbroken. While touring Europe in 1995 or 1996, he briefly dated a woman named Sabina and then dated a Canadian model named Claudia Opdenkelder. He stated, "I had come out of a relationship, so I wasn't looking for anything serious."

On December 6, 2000, Dorough met Leigh Anne Boniello, a film executive producer for Warner Brothers and DreamWorks, who was the webmaster of the official Backstreet Boys website at the time. Howie and Leigh dated for six years, and in 2006, he proposed to her in front of her family on New Year's. A year later, on December 8, 2007, they married in a traditional Catholic ceremony at St. James Cathedral in Orlando, where he was baptized and sang in the choir. They have two sons together. Dorough helped his wife launch her first line of eco-friendly handbags called Eslla, a luxury company she designed and founded with her friend of more than a decade, Charlotte Wienckoski.

== Discography ==
=== Albums ===
Title	Year	Peak positions
Title	Year	JPN
Back to Me	Released: November 9, 2011 (Japan); Released: November 15, 2011 (United States); Label: avex trax (JP), RCA (US); Formats: CD, digital download	56
Live from Toronto	Released: March 13, 2012; Format: Digital download	
Which One Am I	Released: July 12, 2019; Label: Formats: Digital Download, CD	

=== Singles ===
Year	Single	Album
2011	100	Back to Me
2011	Lie to Me	Back to Me
2012	Going Going Gone	Back to Me
2019	No Hablo Español	Which One Am I
2019	The Me I'm Meant to Be	Which One Am I
2019	Monsters In My Head	Which One Am I
2026	"Coqui"	

=== Collaborations ===
- "Every Minute, Every Hour" (co-writer) (2gether)
- "Show Me What You Got" (Bratz featuring BoA and Howie Dorough)
- "I'll Be There" (Howie Dorough featuring Sarah Geronimo)
- "It Still Matters ~愛は眠らない(Ai wa Nemuranai)~" (The Gospellers featuring Howie Dorough)
- "I Like It" (co-writer) (So Real, Mandy Moore)
- "If I Say" (Howie Dorough featuring U)
- "Worth Fighting For" (Howie Dorough featuring U)
- "New Tomorrow" (featuring Howie D) (A Friend in London feat Howie Dorough)

== Filmography ==
TV series & movies
Year	Film	Role	Notes
1989	Parenthood	Student in Class (uncredited)	
1990	Welcome Freshmen	Lead (Pilot)	
1998	Sabrina the Teenage Witch	Himself	Episode: "Battle of the Bands"
1998–1999	Saturday Night Live	Himself and Musical guest	"Julianne Moore/Backstreet Boys" (Season 23: episode 16) "Sarah Michelle Gellar/Backstreet Boys" (Season 24: episode 19)
2000	Roswell	Alien (cameo)	Season 1 episode 22 "Destiny"
2000–2014	Dora the Explorer	Santa, Singing Bridge	2 episodes
2002	Sabrina the Teenage Witch	Strum	Season 7 episode 2 "The Big Head"
2002	Arthur	Himself (guest voice)	Episode: "Arthur, It's Only Rock 'n' Roll"
2002	Sesame Street	Himself	
2005	The Ellen DeGeneres Show	Himself	Musical Guest with the Backstreet Boys
2009	El Hormiguero	Himself	Musical Guest with the Backstreet Boys
2012	Late Night with Jimmy Fallon	Himself	Musical Guest with the Backstreet Boys
2013	El Hormiguero	Himself	Musical Guest with the Backstreet Boys
2013	This Is the End	Himself	With the Backstreet Boys, performing "Everybody (Backstreet's Back)"
2014	I Heart Nick Carter	Himself	minor
2016	Dead 7	The Vaquero	
2017	Big Star Little Star	Himself	with son James Dorough
2021	Long Island Medium: There in Spirit	Himself	Season 1 episode 6
2024	Name That Tune	Himself	
2026	Hell's Kitchen	Himself	Chef's tabke guest diner for the red team; Episode: "The Meat of the Matter"

== See also ==
- List of Puerto Ricans
