= Mandy Jiroux =

American singer (born 1987)

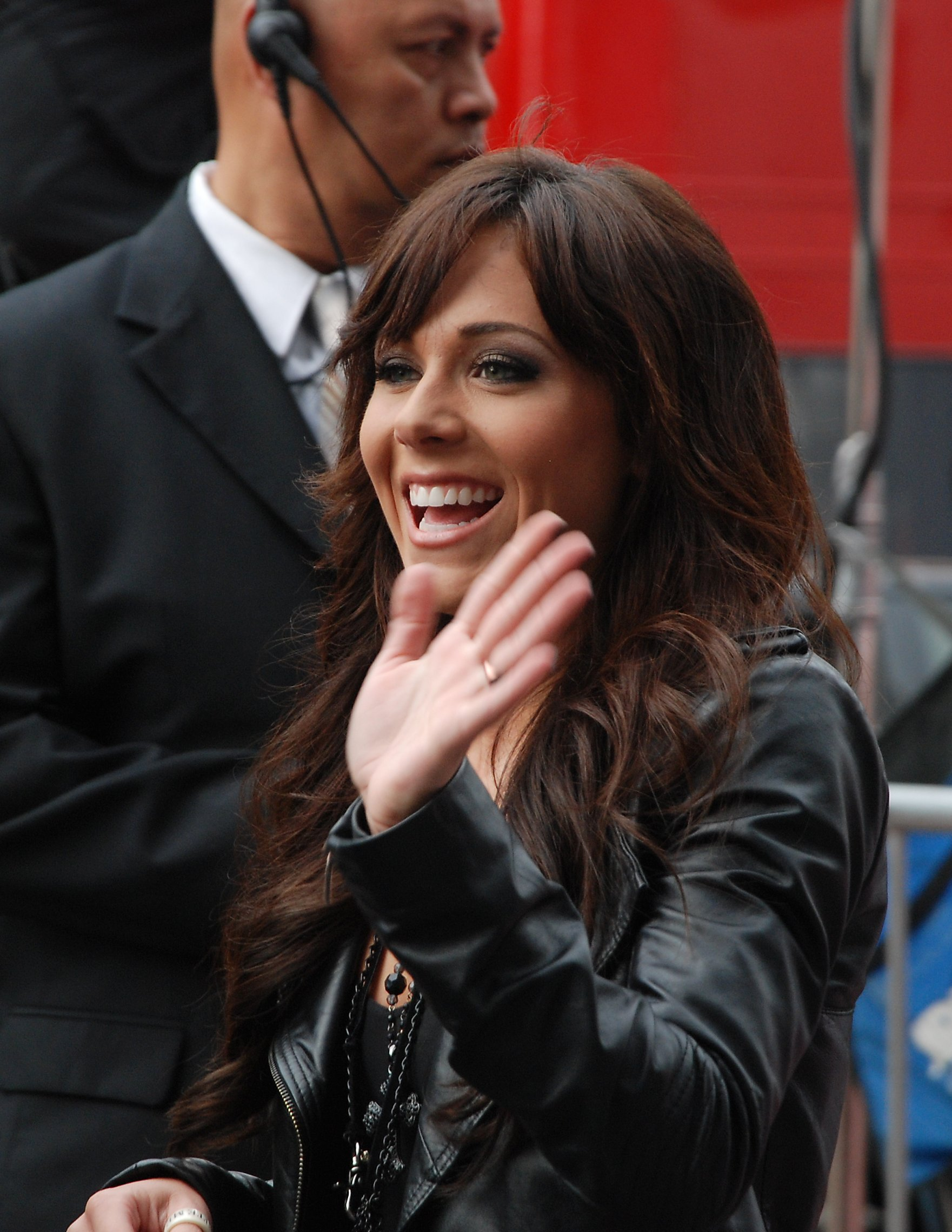
- Mandy in 2012

Background information
- Born: Amanda Michelle Jiroux; Phoenix, Arizona, U.S.
- Occupations: Dancer; singer; DJ; actress
- Instrument: Vocals
- Years active: 2006–present
- Label: Varcity Productions

Amanda Michelle Jiroux (born December 15, 1987), known professionally as Mandy Jiroux, is an American singer, dancer, actress, choreographer, and DJ. She is known for co-developing The Miley and Mandy Show web series with Miley Cyrus, and for her dance tutorial YouTube channel.

== Career ==
=== Choreography and backup dancing ===
Jiroux began dancing competitively by the age of 3 and toured with professional choreographers throughout her school years.

From 2007 to 2008, Jiroux served as a backup dancer for Miley Cyrus on her Best of Both Worlds Tour, and the two girls became friends. In 2008, they began The Miley and Mandy Show on YouTube, and their videos quickly accumulated millions of views. She has later claimed that, during this period, Jiroux taught Cyrus how to twerk.

In April 2008, director Jon Chu and dancer Adam Sevani founded the ACDC Dance Cru and challenged Cyrus and Jiroux's "M&M Cru" to a YouTube dance competition. The two crews continued to release dance videos over the following months, accumulating millions of views, and culminating in a final televised dance battle at the 2008 Teen Choice Awards.

=== With BG5 ===
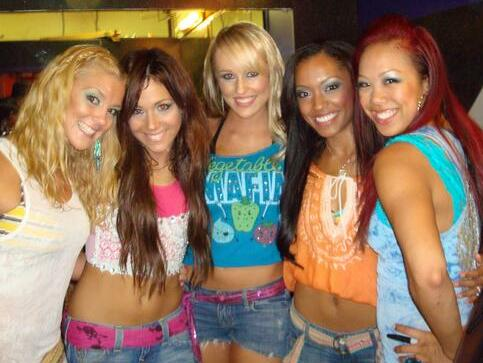
Jiroux (second from left) with BG5 in 2009.

In 2008, Jiroux joined the all-girl group BG5 (which stands for The Beach Girl5) alongside Brooke Allison, Noreen Juliano, Laura New, and Dominique Domingo. In 2010, Kris Jenner became part of the group's management and the group appeared in several episodes of Keeping Up with the Kardashians. The group opened for Justin Bieber and Selena Gomez; they also released an EP and several singles produced by Rock Mafia.

Jiroux departed from the group in late 2012, citing a desire for more creative control over her music and style. In 2014, she noted: "As much as I loved it and I loved the girls, I’m much happier doing my own thing."

=== Solo career ===
Jiroux continued a YouTube presence on her own channel dedicated to breaking down popular choreography into quick lessons. The series has amassed millions of views, and her channel has over one million subscribers. In 2014, Jiroux partnered with YouTube musicians Chester See and Kurt Hugo Schneider to release a medley music video of Zedd songs.

That same year, Jiroux DJed and performed at the Milwaukee Summerfest, in a lineup that included DJ Cassidy and Arctic Monkeys. Also in 2014, Jiroux was featured on "Tonight", a track by Fagault & Marina. The song was later remixed by DJ and EDM producer Starkillers.

In 2015, Jiroux released the single "My Forever", under VarCity Productions, which was followed by "Fade Away" the next year, under Armada Music. Both tracks were collaborations with EDM duo REEZ.

In 2016, Jiroux was sued by members of the band Blind Melon over her song "Insane", which incorporated large sections of Blind Melon's "No Rain". According to the lawsuit, Blind Melon's manager and guitarist were told by Mandy's manager that "Insane" was merely a cover of "No Rain", but upon discovering the liberties that "Insane" took with the original song, concluded that it was actually a "derivative work" under copyright law and consequently unauthorized. The lawsuit was settled between the parties the following year.
