= Cinderella II: Dreams Come True =

2002 animated film by John Kafka

- Home video release poster
- Directed by: John Kafka
- Written by: Jill E. Blotevogel; Tom Rogers; Jule Selbo
- Produced by: Mary Thorne; Mary Alice Drumm
- Starring: Jennifer Hale; Corey Burton; Russi Taylor; Rob Paulsen
- Edited by: Julie Ann Lau
- Music by: Michael Tavera
- Production company: Walt Disney Television Animation
- Distributed by: Buena Vista Home Entertainment (Note: Distributed by Walt Disney Home Video under the Walt Disney Pictures banner.)
- Release date: February 26, 2002
- Running time: 73 minutes
- Country: United States
- Language: English

Cinderella II: Dreams Come True (also known as Cinderella 2: Dreams Come True) is a 2002 American animated direct-to-video fantasy anthology film and serves as the sequel to the 1950 film Cinderella. Directed by John Kafka from a screenplay written by Jill E. Blotevogel, Tom Rogers, and Julie Selbo, it is the first in the Cinderella franchise to use digital ink and paint and stars the voices of Jennifer Hale, Russi Taylor, Corey Burton, and Rob Paulsen. The film centers on Jaq, Gus, the Fairy Godmother, and the rest of the mice, as they create a three-story narrative about what happened after Cinderella married Prince Charming and moved in his castle along with the mice, her two stepsisters, and Lady Tremaine's cat, Lucifer.

Cinderella II: Dreams Come True was released by Buena Vista Home Entertainment on February 26, 2002, and received generally negative reviews from critics, though it recouped its budget.

== Plot ==
In the royal palace, Cinderella's mice friends Jaq and Gus head to a chamber where the Fairy Godmother is reading the story of Cinderella to the other mice. Much to their disappointment, Jaq and Gus arrive just as she has finished the story. With her help, the mice set off to make a new book to narrate what happens after the Happily Ever After, by stringing three segments of stories together into one narrative.

- Aim to Please: Cinderella and the Prince return from their honeymoon, and Cinderella reunites with her mice friends and her dog Bruno. She is later put in charge of the palace banquets and parties while the King and the Prince are away. However, Cinderella is dissatisfied with the emphasis on tradition and decides to organize the upcoming party her own way. Although he initially seems to be shocked at Cinderella's changes, the King ends up satisfied with the party.
- Tall Tail: Jaq thinks he is too small to help Cinderella in the palace as he used to do, so the Fairy Godmother turns Jaq into a human so he can help out, but this does not stop Pom-Pom, the King's royal cat, from chasing him around to eat him, and the mice do not recognize him. After an incident with an elephant at the spring festival, Jaq learns to be happy with himself.
- An Uncommon Romance: Anastasia, one of Cinderella's stepsisters, falls in love with a baker, of whom her mother Lady Tremaine and sister Drizella disapprove. Cinderella, unbeknownst to anyone else, arrives and secretly watches as Lady Tremaine berates Anastasia, thus leading her to help Anastasia in getting ready for the ball together, which ends successfully. When Lady Tremaine's cat, Lucifer, falls in love with Pom-Pom, Jaq, Gus, and the other mice agree to help him woo her, but on the condition that he stops chasing them. Lucifer manages to win Pom-Pom's heart, but he breaks his promise to hunt the mice with her, so Jaq calls the deal off.

The mice finish their book, and they gather in front of the fire with Cinderella, who begins to read their story.

== Cast ==
- Jennifer Hale as Cinderella. She was voiced by Ilene Woods in the original film.
- Christopher Daniel Barnes as Prince Charming. He was voiced by William Edward Phipps in the original film.
- Rob Paulsen as Jaq/Grand Duke/The Baker/Sir Hugh/Bert/Flower Vendor. Jaq was voiced by Jimmy MacDonald in the original film. The Grand Duke was voiced by Luis van Rooten in the original film.
- Corey Burton as Gus/Mert. Gus was also voiced by MacDonald in the original film.
- Andre Stojka as The King. He was also voiced by Van Rooten in the original film.
- Holland Taylor as Prudence.
- Russi Taylor as the Fairy Godmother, Drizella Tremaine, Mary Mouse, Beatrice, Countless Le Grande and Daphne. Fairy Godmother was voiced by Verna Felton in the original film. Drizella was voiced by Rhoda Williams in the first film.
- Susanne Blakeslee as Lady Tremaine. She was voiced by Eleanor Audley in the original film.
- Tress MacNeille as Anastasia Tremaine. She was originally voiced by Lucille Bliss.
- Frank Welker as Lucifer/Pom-Pom/Bruno. Lucifer was voiced by June Foray in the original film. Bruno was also voiced by MacDonald in the first film.

== Soundtrack ==
The songs for the film were performed by Brooke Allison, and while a true soundtrack was never released, all the songs were included on the compilation album Disney's Princess Favorites, which was released shortly before the film. One song, Put It Together (Bibbidi Bobbidi Boo), was also included on the compilation album Superstar Hits, which was released shortly after the film.

== Reception ==
=== Box office ===
The film surpassed the $120 million mark in home media sales.

=== Critical reception ===
On the review aggregator website Rotten Tomatoes, 13% of 8 critics' reviews are positive. Several critics agreed that it looked like pieced-together remains of a rejected television series, akin to Beauty and the Beast: Belle's Magical World and Atlantis: Milo's Return. The segment An Uncommon Romance, however, drew particular praise for developing Anastasia's character.

== Release ==
Cinderella II: Dreams Come True was released on February 26, 2002, on DVD and VHS. It was then re-released on December 18, 2007, as a special-edition DVD, going back in the Disney Vault a month later on January 31, 2008. On November 20, 2012, the film was released with the other Cinderella sequel Cinderella III: A Twist in Time as a two-movie collection on DVD and for the first time on Blu-ray. Both sequels along with the 'Diamond Edition' release of the original film returned to the Disney Vault on January 31, 2017.
