= CJ Huyer =

Canadian singer and producer

- Born: Chris Jacob Huyer

Chris Jacob Huyer, better known as CJ Huyer, is a Canadian singer, music manager and producer. He was a member of American-Canadian boy band 3Deep along with actors-turned-singers Eddie Cibrian and Joshua Morrow, both co-stars in The Young and the Restless. The band enjoyed success in Canada, Europe, and Asia from 1998 to 2001 before disbanding.

Since then, Huyer has remained in the music business, founding and co-managing 3 Street Management and HC Entertainment alongside his partner Howie Dorough of the Backstreet Boys. He currently manages Interscope recording artist Dan Talevski, girl group No More Drama, and Canadian act Neverest. He managed Canadian artist George Nozuka until 2009.
