= Tor Hyams =

American songwriter and record producer (born 1969)

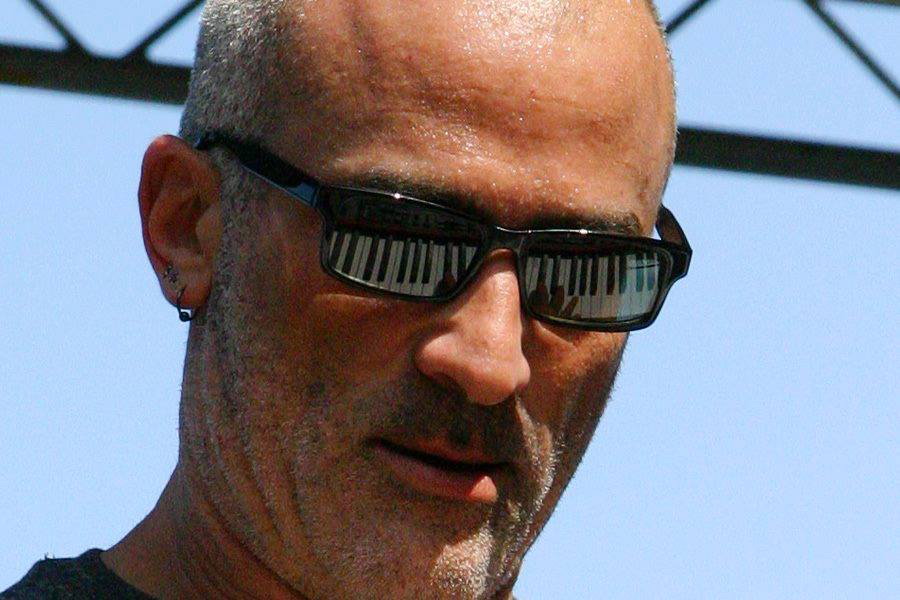
- At Lollapalooza in April 2014
- Born: May 28, 1969 (age 57); New York City, New York, U.S.
- Occupations: Songwriter, composer, record producer
- Years active: 1991–present
- Website: www.tor.net

Tor Hyams (born May 28, 1969) is an American songwriter and record producer. Hyam's roster of artists include Joan Osborne, Edwin McCain, Vivian Campbell, Billy Gibbons, Lou Rawls, Rachel York, Lisa Loeb, Perry Farrell and Deborah Harry.

== Career ==
Hyams works as a musical theatre composer. His first musical, Greenwood, which was written with Adam LeBow, debuted at the 2011 New York Musical Theatre Festival (NYMF). His second musical, Stealing Time, written with Lisa St. Lou, is now being developed for Broadway and has appeared at the Emerging Artists Theatre and the Finger Lakes Musical Theatre Festival. Accolades in this field include the BMI Lehman Engel Musical Theatre Workshop and the Johnny Mercer Writer's Colony at Goodspeed Opera House. He is currently under commission on several projects. including Green Acres, and Untitled, a project for Theatrical Rights Worldwide (TRW). Original theater projects also include The Skylight Room, a collaboration with John Cariani, The 1st Annual Trump Family Special, a musical review of the first family, Howie D: Back in the Day (premier date Jan. 2020 at The Rose Theatre in Omaha, NE, a family musical loosely based on the childhood of Backstreet Boy, Howie D, Senior Living, a play with music about people dying to live and Collateral Beauty, a musical adaptation of the film by Allan Loeb, which held its first workshop at Montclair State University.

Hyams has also worked on children's music, writing and producing the CD A World of Happiness for Disney's Buena Vista Records featuring performances from Samuel L. Jackson, Magic Johnson, Lou Rawls, Isaac Hayes, Deborah Harry, Gary Oldman, Perry Farrell, Lisa Loeb, Michael McKean, Annette O'Toole, Brad Whitford, and Jane Kaczmarek. He also co-produced the music video for one of the tracks "The Patience Bossa", directed by Gary Oldman and featuring a duet by Perry Farrell and Deborah Harry. He recently produced and co-wrote a family album for Howie D called Which One Am I (release date July 12, 2019).

In 2005, Hyams developed and presented the children's music festival, Kidzapalooza, with Perry Farrell at the Lollapalooza music festival in Chicago. In 2009 Kidzapalooza was a stand-alone festival at the Hollywood Bowl in Los Angeles, again produced by Hyams and Farrell. Kidzapalooza has run for six years with Hyams as producer and emcee. It will continue to at least 2015 and has spawned Kidzapalooza Radio on Sirius/XM and a compilation album. Hyams also produces the children's festival Austin Kiddie Limits as part of the Austin City Limits Music Festival. He now produces the Recess Family Music Festival in Detroit, Michigan and was a founding member of the now defunct KindieFest.

In 2008, Hyams produced the Lisa St. Lou's album OH DANG!.

Another of his projects is Chutzpah (the world's first Jewish Hip Hop Super Group). Their reality-based comedy short film, Chutzpah, This Is? (The Official Hip-Hop-U-Mentary), stars George Segal, Gary Oldman, Debi Mazar and Vivian Campbell. It received accolades from the HBO Comedy Festival and the Los Angeles Jewish Film Festival Audience Award and received official selection at 16 film festivals, both in the USA and overseas. The group has since made several TV appearances and radio broadcasts, including Fox TV LA and Good Day New York. Their second album Hip Hop Fantasy was released in July 2009.

== Discography ==
- 1996 Various Artists, Underground Music Series Vol. 4
- 1995 Various Artists, Underground Music Series Vol. 3
- 1994 Tor Hyams, Zoom Ba Da Bing
- 1998 Tor Hyams, Vultures
- 2000 Tor Hyams, Eye To Eye
- 2002 Gretchen Parlato, self-titled debut album
- 2004 Various Artists, A World of Happiness
- 2005 Chutzpah, Eponymous
- 2006 Lou Rawls, Christmas
- 2007 Joan Osborne, Christmas Means Love
- 2008 Julie Silver, It's Chanukah Time
- 2009 Chutzpah, Hip Hop Fantasy
- 2005 Rachel York, Let's Fall in Love
- 2005 Vivian Campbell, Two Sides of If
- 2006 Tor Hyams, Lilah Tov
- 2007 Tor Hyams, This is Chanukah
- 2007 Various Artists, A Chanukah Celebration
- 2007 Jambo, Lucy's Parade
- 2008 Transylvannian Orchestra, Music of the Night
- 2008 Edwin McCain, Nobody's Fault But Mine
- 2009 Milkshake, Great Day
- 2009 Various Artists, Kidzapalooza, Volume 1
- 2009 Anacron, Delicious Vinyl Kids
- 2010 Jim Cosgrove, Swimming in Noodles
- 2010 Lunch Money, Original Friend
- 2010 Take it Outside, The Okie Dokie Brothers
- 2010 Greenwood Soundtrack
- 2011 Recess Monkey, Flying
- 2011 Tor Hyams, Rock the Cradle
- 2007 Joan Osborne, Breakfast in Bed
- 2008 Joan Osborne, Christmas Means Love
- 2010 Frances England, Mind of My Own
- 2012 Hullabaloo, Raise A Ruckus
- 2012 Stealing Time Musical Soundtrack
- 2013 Jambo, Hootenanny
- 2013 Morning Wish Garden, The Ohmies
- 2014 Sam Cieri, self-titled
- 2014 Dyllan Murray, No Lies
- 2016 Lisa Rothauser, Life. Who Knew?
- 2019 Howie D, Which One Am I
- 2020 Edwin McCain, Merry Christmas, Baby
- 2021 Lisa St. Lou, Ain't No Good Man
- 2022 Lisa St. Lou, Mes Trucs Préférés
- 2024 Lisa St. Lou, OH DANG!

Contributed to:

- 2003 Tricky, Back To Mine, wrote "Little Bit"
- 2009 We're Not Kidding, A Tribute to Barry Louis Polisar, performed "Hey Jack, What's in the Sack" and "Go and Hush the Baby"
- 2009 Terraplane Sun, Keyboard player
- 2010 23 SKidoo, Underground Playground, co-wrote "Secret Handshake"
- 2010 Disco Biscuits, Planet Anthem
- 2012 Science Fair with Renee & Jeremy, co-wrote "(I Wanna Be Like) Madam Curie"
- 2013 Songs for a Healthier America, wrote "Change The Game" featuring Nawledge
