= Back to Me (Howie Dorough album) =

Studio album by Howie D
- Released: November 9, 2011
- Recorded: 2002–2011
- Studios: Anotha Smash (Orlando, Florida); Beatbox (Los Angeles, California); Dreamlab (Los Angeles, California); Engine Room (Los Angeles, California); Magic Mix (Miami, Florida); Sub Level D3 (Los Angeles, California); SYBH (Los Angeles, California); Village Recorder (Los Angeles, California)
- Genre: Pop
- Length: 46:34
- Labels: Avex Group, HowieDolt Music
- Producer: Howie Dorough (executive)

Howie D chronology
Back to Me (2011)	Live from Toronto (2012)

Singles from Back to Me
- 1. "100" Released: June 3, 2011; 2. "Lie to Me" Released: October 4, 2011; 3. "Going Going Gone" Released: February 28, 2012

Back to Me is the debut solo studio album by American singer-songwriter Howie Dorough, known for being a member of the Backstreet Boys. The album was released on November 9, 2011, in Japan, through Avex Group, and on November 15, 2011, in the United States, through HowieDolt Music. The album, a pop record, was recorded from 2002 to 2011, and was produced by Dorough himself. Three singles were released from the album: "100", "Lie to Me", and "Going Going Gone". The album's Japanese edition features a sole guest appearance from Yu Shirota, who performs as "U". Upon its release, the album charted at number 56 on Oricon's Japanese Albums Chart.

== Background and recording ==
Back to Me was recorded with a multitude of songwriters and producers. Production on the album began in 2002 following the Backstreet Boys' initial hiatus, but when the group later re-united in 2004, the project was shelved. Following the band's revival, Dorough continued working on the album in his spare time, and in 2008, made an official announcement regarding the album. Dorough initially started off with a Latin sound in mind, exploring his heritage and roots. Following the band's sixth album, This is Us, Dorough returned to the studio and completed the project, finally changing the direction of the genre to pop-dance.

Recording for the album began in 2002, following the Backstreet Boys' initial hiatus. Dorough initially envisaged the album as having a Latin sound, as he wanted to get as far away from the Backstreet Boys' sound as possible. He recorded around eight demo tracks at this point, but when the band reformed in 2004, Dorough shelved the project. He again revisited it in 2008, working on the demos he had previously written as well as new material. It was not until the conclusion of the band's 2010 world tour that Dorough found he had enough time in his grueling schedule to fully commit to the album. With AJ McLean also working on a solo project in Japan at the time, Dorough was encouraged by his bandmate to approach Avex Group, who, impressed with the sales of McLean's solo project in the region, later signed Dorough as well. At this point, Dorough returned to the studio, where he decided to change the direction of the album from the unfamiliar Latin to the popular pop-dance genre which worked well for McLean. As well as collaborating with a number of new producers and songwriters, Dorough re-worked some of his Latin demos, changing the lyrics and composition to suit the style of the album.

Dorough recorded an unreleased Backstreet Boys song which he had co-written with Nick Carter, called "Pure", which they had been unable to complete for inclusion on the This Is Us album. He also worked with Wayne Rodrigues on a number of songs, and also co-wrote with Jodi Marr.

== Promotion and release ==
The album's lead single, "100", was released to success in Japan, with a promotional tour and a number of live dates to follow. As such, Dorough was asked to record exclusive material for the Japanese market only as a reward to the fans, and as such, he joined with singer and entertainer Yu Shirota, whom he had discovered whilst searching YouTube for popular Japanese artists. The pair soon came together in the recording studio to record a song specially written by Dorough, called "If I Say". The Japanese deluxe edition of the album includes a bonus DVD which features footage of the pair recording the song. The album was subsequently released in the United States by HowieDolt music, and was later released in Germany the following year. The German edition also includes a bonus track, called "Over and Under".

== Track listing ==
Back to Me – Standard edition
No.	Title	Writer(s)	Producer(s)	Length
1.	"100"	Robert T. Gerongco; Samuel T. Gerongco; Jedediah Harper	Kuya; Jed Harper	3:29
2.	"Back to Me"	Howie Dorough; Nicholas Furlong; Jerrod Bettis	Jerrod "SKINS" Bettis	3:43
3.	"Going Going Gone"	Dorough; Furlong; Ry Keyz	Ry Keyz	3:56
4.	"Lie to Me"	Chris DeStefano; Zac Poor; Cam Rindal	Chris DeStefano	3:54
5.	"Pure"	Dorough; Nick Carter; Daniel James; Leah Haywood	Dreamlab	3:54
6.	"Sleepwalking"	Steven Lee Olsen; Ivan Corrailiza; Lauren Evans; Michael Linney	ILL Factor	3:41
7.	"Stay"	Dorough; Poor; Christian Nilsson	Chris Birgersen	4:23
8.	"This Is Just What I Needed"	Dorough; Leigh Elliott	Lee Major; Dakari (vocal)	4:15
9.	"Dominoes"	Dorough; Wayne Rodrigues; Andrea Remanda; Devin "DLP" Parker	Wayne Rodrigues; Devin "DLP" Parker (add.)	4:04
10.	"Over My Head"	Dorough; Rodrigues; Kasia Livingston; Dwayne Larring	Wayne Rodrigues	3:43
11.	"Shatterproof"	Dorough; Rodrigues; Jodi Marr	Wayne Rodrigues	3:54
12.	"Way to Your Heart"	Adam Anders; Nikki Anders; Peer Åström; Poor	Adam Anders; Peer Åström; Bo Christian Nilsson (add.)	3:34
13.	"Unica"	Dorough; George Noriega; Jorge Gonzalez; Liza Quin	George Noriega; Jorge Gonzalez	4:07

Back to Me – German edition bonus track
No.	Title	Writer(s)	Producer(s)	Length
13.	"Over and Under"			4:02
14.	"Unica"	Dorough; George Noriega; Jorge Gonzales; Liza Quin	George Noriega; Jorge Gonzales	4:07

Back to Me – Japanese edition bonus track
No.	Title	Writer(s)	Producer(s)	Length
14.	"If I Say" (featuring U)	Ramzi Sleiman	Howie Dorough; U; Chieko Nakayama	3:54

Back to Me – Japanese deluxe edition bonus DVD
No.	Title	Length
1.	"100 – Behind-the-Scenes"
2.	"100 – Music Video"
3.	"Back to Me – Recording the Album"

== Personnel ==
- Adam Anders – programming (track 12)
- Peer Åström – programming (track 12)
- Jerrod "SKINS" Bettis – engineer (track 2)
- Chris Birgersen – programming (track 7)
- Deyder Cintron – engineer (track 7)
- Dakari – engineer (track 8)
- Chris DeStefano – programming, arrangements, musician, background vocals, and engineer (track 4)
- Christian Dwiggins – engineer (track 1), mixing (tracks 1–5, 7, 8, 13)
- Jorge Gonzalez – engineering (track 13)
- Jed Harper – musician (track 1)
- Daniel James – engineer (track 5)
- Kid Famous – guest rapper (track 8)
- Kuya – musicians (track 1)
- Dwayne Larring – guitars (tracks 10, 11)
- Kasia Livingston – background vocals (track 10)
- Tony Maserati – mixing (track 10)
- Bo Christian Nilsson – mixing (track 12)
- Devin "DLP" Parker – keyboards (track 9)
- Tom Polce – mixing (tracks 9, 11)
- Zac Poor – background vocals (tracks 4, 12)
- Andrea Remanda – background vocals (track 9)
- Wayne Rodrigues – keyboards, drum programming, and Pro Tools editing (tracks 9–11)
- Beau Valais – engineer and mixing (track 6)

== Charts ==
Chart (2011)	Peak position
Japanese Albums (Oricon)	56
