= Lisa St. Lou =

American singer-songwriter

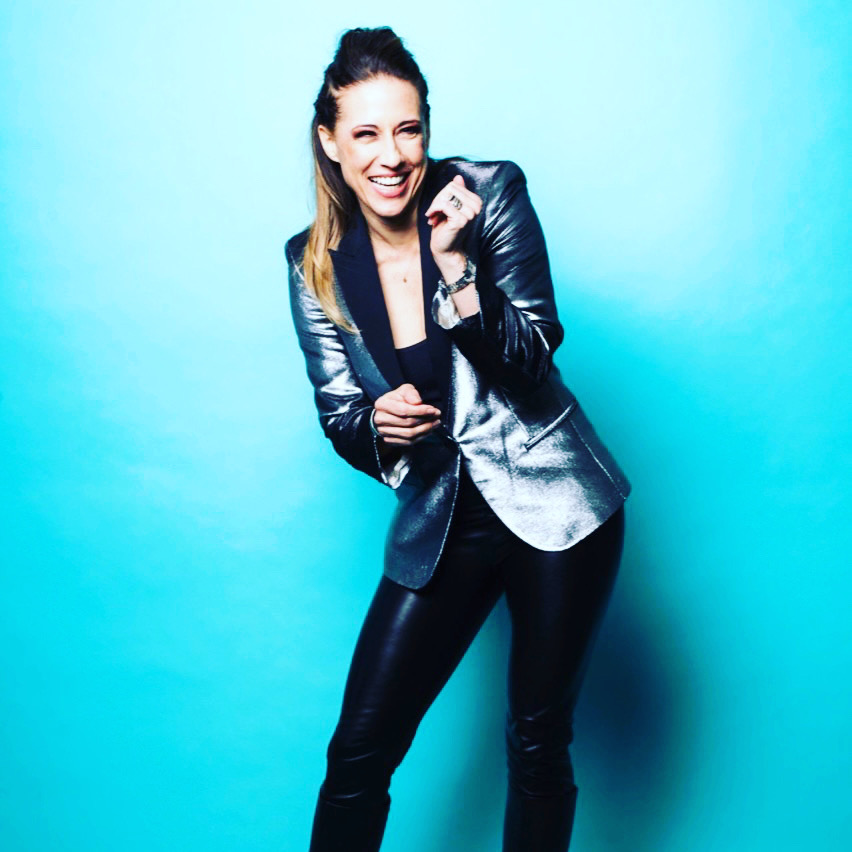

Background information
- Born: Lisa Marie Neubauer; May 1, 1975 (age 51); St. Louis, Missouri, U.S.
- Genres: Blues; soul; R&B; gospel; pop
- Occupations: Singer; songwriter
- Instrument: Vocals
- Website: Lisastlou.com

Lisa Marie St. Lou (born May 1, 1975) is an American singer-songwriter, writer, and performer based in Brooklyn, New York. St. Lou experienced breakthrough success relatively late in life at 45 years old when she released her debut soul album, Ain't No Good Man in 2021, featuring soul and funk musicians Irma Thomas and Cyril Neville. Her single, "I've Seen The Light” debuted at #29 on Billboard's Adult Contemporary chart and remained in the top 30 for seven weeks.

== Biography ==
=== Early life ===
St. Lou was born Lisa Marie Neubauer in St. Louis, Missouri, the daughter of Brenda Rice and Daniel Neubauer, and was an only child. She began her musical journey singing soulful versions of classic hymns in her grandma's Baptist church in south St. Louis. Musical influences were Nina Simone, Aretha Franklin, and Janis Joplin. She received her Bachelor of Music from Truman State University and attended Boston University's School for the Arts, obtaining a Master of Music in vocal performance.

=== As a performer ===
St. Lou's most notable roles include Lick Me Bite Me in the Second National Tour of Mel Brooks' The Producers directed by Susan Stroman, in which she went on to perform the roles of Hold Me Touch Me and Lick me Bite Me in the Broadway production. She co-produced and played multiple roles in Mock Your World as well as sold-out solo shows called Life. WTF? at Joe's Pub and Life. Who Knew? at Feinstein's 54 Below. She co-wrote the music and lyrics to the off-Broadway run of The 1st Annual Trump Family Special in which she also played the role of Ivanka Trump opposite Gina Gershon as Melania.

=== As a writer ===
St. Lou's premiered her first musical titled Stealing Time, which she co-wrote with Grammy-nominated songwriter and record producer, Tor Hyams, at the New York Musical Theatre Festival in 2012 starring Rachel York and Jeremy Kushner. St. Lou and Hyams have since continued their collaboration that has included a commission for the musical adaptation of Green Acres, and Quarantween. Other works include Howie D: Back in the Day co-written with Howie D of the Backstreet Boys (World Premiere 2019 at The Rose Theater, Omaha, NE) and Senior Living (World Premiere 2022 at Portland Stage Company in Portland, ME directed by Judith Ivey) and contributed an original song for a new work called Ensemble 2.0, featuring letters written by Tennessee Williams developed at Tennessee Williams Festival St. Louis, MO.

St. Lou and Hyams have wrote and produced "Give A Little Glo", featuring TikTok star McKenzi Brooke are currently working with Far Out Studios show-running, producing and writing for Season 2 of The Glo Sho on GloUpGirls TV with Far Out Studios and just released a second single, "Rock Your Glo" with girl group Glotivation.

St. Lou and Hyams have been two-time participants at The Johnny Mercer Writers Colony at Goodspeed Opera House (2014, 2018). as well as The New Victory Theater's Labworks Artists.

=== As a singer ===
In 2016, St. Lou released a traditional pop album under her married name titled Lisa Rothauser's Life. Who Knew?, an homage to musical theatre, jazz standards, and originals. In 2019, she co-wrote and was a featured artist on a family album Which One Am I? with Backstreet Boy Howie D and Tor Hyams, who also produced the album. Ain't No Good Man, St. Lou's debut as a soul singer-songwriter, was recorded in New Orleans featuring Ivan Neville on piano and organ, Ian Neville on Guitar, Raymond Weber on drums, Tony Hall on bass, Celisse and Crystal Monee Hall on background vocals, mixed by the late Al Schmitt and was co-written and produced with Tor Hyams. The album was released in February 2021 and landed on Billboard’s top thirty Adult Contemporary chart for seven weeks.

=== Notable performances ===
From Ain't No Good Man were on "Show Me St. Louis" (NBS affiliate) and “Today in Nashville”.

=== Personal life ===
She has two children, Colton Rothauser and Wesley Rothauser.

== Discography ==
- OH DANG! (2024) Hylo Entertainment
- Rock Your Glo (2022) Hylo Entertainment
- Give A Little Glo (2021) Hylo Entertainment
- Ain't No Good Man (2021) Saguaro Road Records
- Which One Am I (2019) Howiedoit Music
- Life. Who Knew? (2016) Hylo Entertainment
