= Elton Ahi =

Persian music producer from in Iran

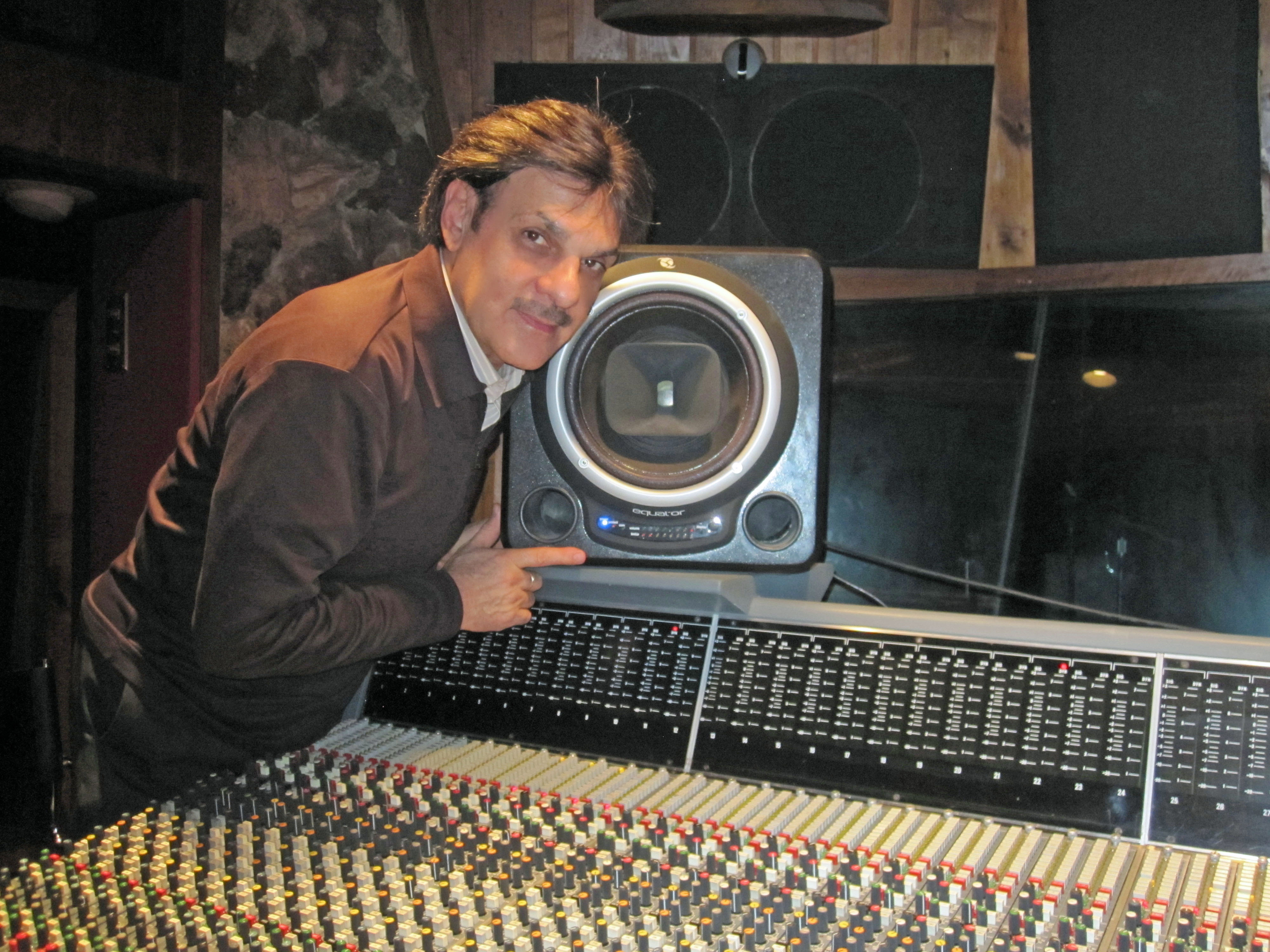
- Elton Ahi

Background information
- Birth name: Farokh Ahi; Persian: فرخ آهی
- Born: 6 August 1954 (age 71)
- Origin: Iran
- Occupation(s): Music Producer, DJ, Songwriter
- Instruments: Drums, guitar, piano
- Years active: 1977–present

Elton Ahi (Persian: التون آهی, also credited as Elton Farokh Ahi, Persian: التون فرخ آهی; born 1954), is a Persian music producer from Iran. He has been credited with music production/ editing/ sound engineering for over 100 Hollywood major motion pictures including: xXx, The Mummy: Tomb of the Dragon Emperor, 27 Dresses, and The Last of the Mohicans, which won an Oscar for sound. He played rock guitar as a teenager in Tehran, Iran. He moved to the United States to attend the University of Southern California. Within a year, he had taught himself to play the piano, first by ear, then after teaching himself to read music. He quickly reached his goal of learning to play nearly every Elton John song.

== Career ==
Elton Ahi began his musical career at the age of 15, writing and producing the Iranian album, "Destination". He started college at USC at a very young age, studying architecture while pursuing his side interest of music by drumming in an American band. After completing his degree, he began DJing and giving consulting services to record labels. He won US "DJ of the Year" in 1977, spinning for such famous clubs as Studio 54 in New York City and Jimmy's in Monaco. Ahi has produced Hamsayehaa, the best-selling Persian album of all time. He has also been credited with being influential in the careers of Persian artists, Andy & Kouros, Siavash and Farez. Elton Ahi currently owns Rusk studios in Los Angeles, recording house for artists such as Donna Summer, Billy Idol, Laura Branigan, and Elton John. He co-produced Engelbert Humperdinck and the Patsy Cline "Duets" album with record producer Michael Blakey (Media Executive). Elton Ahi has also written songs for artists such as Mansour, a contemporary Persian artist. Ahi adopted the moniker "Elton" when a radio station interview in Iran dubbed him "Elton Joon" after recording some Elton John songs.
