= 3Deep =

Soul-pop music boy band (1998–2001)

- Origin: Los Angeles, California, United States
- Genres: Pop, R&B
- Years active: 1998–2001
- Members: Joshua Morrow; Eddie Cibrian; CJ Huyer

3Deep were a soul-pop music boy band composed of American actors Eddie Cibrian (Sunset Beach, Third Watch) and Joshua Morrow (The Young and the Restless), and Canadian singer CJ Huyer.

Their success was mostly in Canada, Europe and Asia as their record label did not release their debut album in the United States.

Their first album Yes Yes Yes...No No No was released in 1999 and featured their biggest hit single "Into You", a top-10 hit on the Canadian charts. Their second album Can't Get Over You was released in 2001. Among the artists they collaborated with were Michie Mee on a track from their first album and with Howie Dorough on a track from their second.

Although 3Deep were largely unknown in the US (despite Cibrian and Morrow's acting successes), they were one of the more successful Canadian boy bands of the era, with a sizeable young female fan base.

In addition to touring, the group performed at events such as Ottawa's Winterlude and appeared on the Juno Awards and at MuchMusic studios.

== Discography ==
=== Studio albums ===
Year	Album details
Yes Yes Yes...No No No	Release date: January 1999; Label: BeatFactory Music Inc.
Can't Get Over You	Release date: May 2001; Label: Sextant Records

=== Singles ===
Year	Single	Peak chart positions		Album
Year	Single	US R&B/HH	CAN	Album
1998	"Into You"	—	46	Yes Yes Yes...No No No
2001	"Can't Get Over You"	—	—	Can't Get Over You
"—" denotes releases that did not chart
