= Brooke Allison =

American pop singer

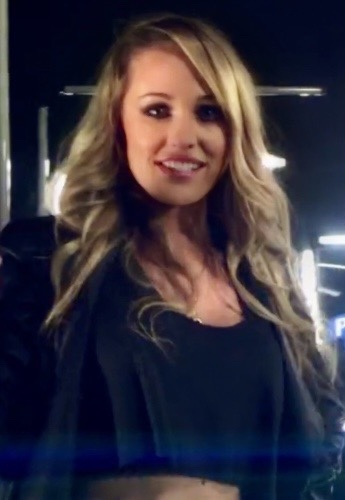
- Adams in 2011

Background information
- Also known as: Brooke Allison
- Born: Brooke Allison Adams; September 26, 1986 (age 39)
- Origin: Fort Worth, Texas, U.S.
- Genres: Pop
- Occupation: Singer
- Years active: 2000–2018
- Label: 2KSounds/Virgin
- Formerly of: The Beach Girl5

Brooke Allison Adams (born September 26, 1986), also known as Brooke Allison, is an American singer. She had a minor hit in 2001 with "The Kiss-Off (Goodbye)". Beginning in 2008, she was a part of the girl group BG5. In 2012, the group reformed as YLA and were active until 2014. Adams has also been credited as a backing vocalist on a number of releases by Miley Cyrus and Selena Gomez.

In August 2018, Adams experienced unspecified medical issues and fell into a coma. As of 2026, she remains in a vegetative state.

== Early life ==
Born in Lampasas and raised in Fort Worth, Adams attended Harvest Christian Academy in Watauga. She later moved to Los Angeles, where she befriended Michael Jackson. She started singing at the age of three. At age ten, she became a youth sponsor and spokesperson for the DARE program, performing at rallies. In 1997, she competed in the World Championships of Performing Arts in Burbank, winning four gold medals in the gospel, country, broadway, and adult contemporary categories. In January 2000, a friend set up a website for her and uploaded MP3s, leading to industry attention and a record deal with 2KSounds, a division of Virgin Records.

== Career ==
=== 2000–2002: Brooke Allison ===
In 2001, Adams's first single "The Kiss-Off (Goodbye)" peaked at number 28 on the Billboard Hot Singles Sales chart. She toured with 98 Degrees on their Revelation tour in 2001. Her debut album Brooke Allison was released in June of that year on 2KSounds/Virgin and featured songwriting contributions from Mýa, Robert Palmer, and Meredith Brooks. She was recruited by AOL as a "Growing Up Advisor" for its Kids Only channel site.

In 2002, Adams appeared on four songs for the movie Cinderella II: Dreams Come True; these songs were included on the compilation Disney's Princess Favorites. She planned to follow her debut with a rock album, but it never materialized.

=== 2008–2018: BG5, YLA, and later work ===
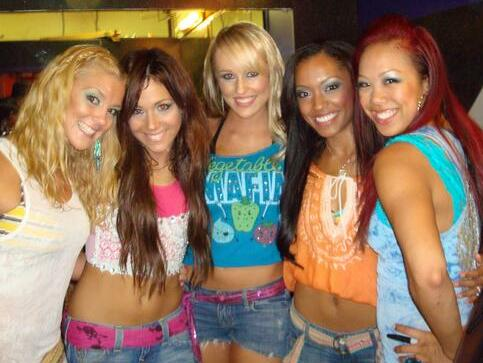
Adams (middle) with BG5 in 2009

In 2008, she became a member of a girl group called BG5 (which stands for Beach Girl 5) along with Mandy Jiroux, Laura New, Dominique Domingo, and Noreen Juliano. During this time, she began being credited under her birth name Brooke Adams. In 2009, Adams provided backing vocals for the Selena Gomez & the Scene single "Naturally". She would go on to provide backing vocals for a number of songs by the group, notably the single "Love You like a Love Song". In 2009, BG5 released the single "Unbreakable" which was followed by the release of their debut EP Beach Girl5. In 2010, Adams provided backing vocals on the Miley Cyrus singles "Can't Be Tamed" and "Who Owns My Heart" in addition to the track "Liberty Walk" from Cyrus's album Can't Be Tamed. She also provided backing vocals on the song "Bam" by Miranda Cosgrove. In 2010, BG5 began being managed by Kris Jenner and appeared on the show Keeping Up with the Kardashians. They released the single "Scratch" in November and the single "Lay A Little Sunshine" in June of the following year.

In late 2012, Jiroux departed from BG5; the group reformed under the name YLA (which stands for Young L.A.) with new member Jaime Lee Ruiz. In March 2013, YLA released the single "$$$EX", a collaboration with Vanessa Hudgens. The song peaked at number 11 on the Billboard Dance Club Songs chart and spent twelve weeks on the chart. In March 2013, the group was featured on the soundtrack for Shake It Up: I Love Dance for the Disney Channel show Shake It Up with the song "I Can Do Better"; the group performed the song on the show's third season episode, "Oui Oui It Up". In September 2013, BG5's self titled full debut album, which was recorded prior to their renaming, was released to digital retailers. In November 2013, YLA released the single "Bad Bitches". The group announced their dissolution on March 7, 2014.

On July 14, 2015, Adams released the single "Still Fighting". In 2016, Adams became a member of the electronic music trio Amera.

== Personal life ==
In August 2018, Brooke experienced medical issues and fell into a coma. Her family set up a GoFundMe page to raise money for her care, listed under the name "Brooke Adams recovery fund". As of 2026, she remains in a vegetative state.

== Discography ==
=== As solo singer ===
==== Albums ====
- Brooke Allison (2001), 2KSounds/Virgin

==== Singles ====
- "The Kiss-Off (Goodbye)" (2001), 2KSounds/Virgin – (US #28-Sales Chart)
- "Thought You Might Wanna Know" (2001)
- "Still Fighting" (2015)
- “Put it Together” (2001), Cinderella 2: Dreams Come True

=== With BG5/YLA ===
==== Albums ====
- BG5 (2013)

==== EPs ====
- Beach Girl5 (2009)

==== Singles ====
- "Unbreakable" (2009)
- "Scratch" (2010)
- "Lay A Little Sunshine" (2011)
- "Kids R OK" (2013)
- "$$$EX" (with Vanessa Hudgens) (2013)
- "Bad Bitches" (2013)
